= William Augustus Ford =

English cricketer

Personal information
- Full name: William Augustus Ford
- Born: c. 1818; England
- Died: 11 April 1873 (aged 54/55); Kensington, Middlesex, England
- Batting: Unknown
- Bowling: Unknown
- Relatives: George Ford (brother); Francis Ford (son); William Ford, Jr. (son); Augustus Ford (son); Neville Ford (grandson)

Domestic team information
- Years: Team
- 1839–1849: Marylebone Cricket Club

Career statistics
Competition	First-class
Matches	6
Runs scored	57
Batting average	5.70
100s/50s	–/–
Top score	28*
Balls bowled	?
Wickets	4
Bowling average	?
5 wickets in innings	–
10 wickets in match	–
Best bowling	3/?
Catches/stumpings	5/–
- Source: Cricinfo, 22 June 2019

William Augustus Ford (c. 1818 – 11 April 1873) was an English first-class cricketer.

The son of George Samuel Ford, he made his debut in first-class cricket for the Marylebone Cricket Club (MCC) against Oxford University at Oxford in 1839. He played first-class cricket intermittently for the MCC between 1839 and 1849, making a total of five appearances. In addition to playing first-class cricket for the MCC, he also appeared in one first-class match for the Gentlemen of Sussex against the MCC in 1839. Across his six first-class appearances, Ford scored 57 runs with a high score of 28 not out, while with the ball he took 3 wickets. Ford had seven sons with his wife, Katherine Mary Justice. Three of his sons were cricketers; Francis, played Test cricket for England, while two other sons, William and Augustus, played first-class cricket. Another son, Lionel served as the Dean of York. Another son was Henry, an illustrator. His brother, George, was a first-class cricketer, as was his grandson, Neville Ford. His great-great-grandson is the adventurer, writer, and television presenter Bear Grylls. He died at Kensington in April 1873.
