= William Justice Ford =

English cricketer, schoolmaster, and sports writer

8th Headmaster of Nelson College
- In office 1886–1888
- Preceded by: John Chapman Andrew
- Succeeded by: John William Joynt

Personal details
- Born: 7 November 1853 Paddington, Middlesex, England
- Died: 3 April 1904 (aged 50) Kensal Green, Middlesex, England
- Spouse: Katherine Macey Browning (m. 1887)
- Relations: Francis Ford (brother); Lionel Ford (brother); Henry Justice Ford (brother); George Samuel Ford (grandfather); Neville Ford (nephew); Bear Grylls (great-great-nephew)
- Cricket career

Cricket information
- Batting: Right-handed
- Bowling: Right-arm slow
- Role: Occasional wicketkeeper

Domestic team information
- Years: Team
- 1873–1874: Cambridge University
- 1879–1894: Middlesex
- 1881–1896: Marylebone Cricket Club
- 1886/87–1888/89: Nelson
- First-class debut: 19 May 1873 England XI v Cambridge University
- Last First-class: 14 May 1896 MCC v Leicestershire

Career statistics
Competition	First-class
Matches	25
Runs scored	711
Batting average	17.77
100s/50s	0/4
Top score	75
Balls bowled	401
Wickets	13
Bowling average	16.38
5 wickets in innings	1
10 wickets in match	0
Best bowling	6/56
Catches/stumpings	19/2
- Source: CricketArchive, 5 February 2016

William Justice Ford (7 November 1853 – 3 April 1904) was an English schoolmaster, known as a cricketer and sports writer.

== Life ==
The eldest of seven sons of William Augustus Ford, of Lincoln's Inn Fields, by his wife Katherine Mary Justice, he was born in London on 7 November 1853; of his brothers, Augustus Frank Justice (b. 1858) and Francis Gilbertson Justice (b. 1866) distinguished themselves in Repton, Cambridge University, and Middlesex cricket, while a third, Lionel George Bridges Justice (b. 1865), became headmaster of Harrow School in 1910. Educated at Eagle House, Wimbledon, and at Repton School, where he played in the cricket eleven (1870–2), William entered St. John's College, Cambridge, as minor scholar in 1872, having first entered Trinity College earlier that year. He became foundation scholar in 1874, and graduated B.A. with second-class classical honours in 1876, proceeding M.A. in 1878.

Ford was a master at Marlborough College from 1877 to 1886, and from that year until 1889 was headmaster of Nelson College, New Zealand. On his return to England he became in April 1890 headmaster of Leamington College, from which he retired in 1893.

Ford died of pneumonia at Abingdon Mansions on 3 April 1904, and was buried at Kensal Green.

== Cricketer ==
Ford was a cricket blue at Cambridge, and played for Middlesex. He was 6 ft. 3 in. in height and weighed in 1886 over 17 stone. He was reputed as one of the hardest-hitting cricketers, surpassed only by Charles Inglis Thornton. His longest authenticated hit was 144 yards; in August 1885 at Maidstone he scored 44 runs in 17 minutes in the first innings, and 75 runs in 45 minutes in the second innings for Middlesex v. Kent. He was a slow round arm bowler and a good field at point.

== Works ==
After retiring from teaching, Ford wrote on cricket, publishing A Cricketer on Cricket (1900); Middlesex County Cricket Club 1864–1899 (1900); and A History of the Cambridge University Cricket Club 1820–1901 (1902). He compiled the articles on "Public School Cricket" for Wisden's Cricketers' Almanack from 1896 to 1904 and in Prince Ranjitsinhji's Jubilee Book of Cricket (1897). He also contributed articles to the Cyclopaedia of Sport and to the Encyclopædia Britannica, and the chapter on "Pyramids and Pool" to the Badminton Library volume Billiards.

== Family ==
Ford married Katherine Macey Browning at All Saints' Church, Nelson, on 22 December 1887.

== Notes ==
Attribution

This article incorporates text from a publication now in the public domain: Lee, Sidney, ed. (1912). "Ford, William Justice". Dictionary of National Biography (2nd supplement). Vol. 2. London: Smith, Elder & Co.
