= George Ford =

George Ford may refer to:

== Sports ==
- George Ford (cricketer) (1817–1848), English cricketer and clergyman
- George Ford (coach) (1871–1941), American football player and coach
- George Ford (footballer) (1891–?), English amateur football left back
- George Ford (baseball) (fl. 1920–1924), American baseball player
- George Ford (ice hockey) (born 1930), Canadian ice hockey player
- George Ford (rugby union) (born 1993), English rugby union player
- George Ford (water polo) (born 1993), Australian water polo player

== Others ==
- George Samuel Ford (1790–1868), bill discounter and solicitor
- George Henry Ford (1808–1876), South African natural history illustrator
- George W. Ford (Irish soldier) (1844–1883), Irish soldier who fought in the American Civil War
- George W. Ford (Buffalo Soldier), U.S. military officer in the Spanish–American War and Buffalo Soldier
- George Ford (American politician) (1846–1917), American politician and judge
- George Alfred Ford (1851–1928), American missionary in Syria and Lebanon
- George Barry Ford (1885–1978), American Roman Catholic priest, theologian, and social activist
- George Ford (Australian politician) (1907–1966), Australian politician and unionist
- George Ford (bassist) (1940–2007), British bassist
- George Ford (illustrator) (fl. 1970s), American illustrator
