= Archdeacon of York =

Senior clergy in the Church of England

The Archdeacon of York (or of the West Riding) is a senior clergy position in an archdeaconry subdivision of the Church of England Diocese of York in the Province of York. The archdeaconry is named for the City of York and consists of the seven rural deaneries of Derwent, Easingwold, New Ainsty, Selby, Southern Ryedale, South Wold and York.

== History ==
There were archdeacons in the Diocese of York before 1093. Before 1128, there were five serving simultaneously, probably each in their own area, but none occurs with a territorial title before 1133. The title Archdeacon of York is first recorded before 1153 with Robert Butevilain, Archdeacon of York. Of the five archdeaconries, York is one of three which has never split from York diocese.

The current Archdeacon is the Revd Canon Liz Hassall, who was first appointed on an acting basis, before being appointed permanently. The suffragan Bishop of Selby exercises episcopal oversight over the archdeaconry.

== List of archdeacons ==
=== High Medieval ===
==== Territories not recorded ====
- bef. 1093–aft. 1070/bef. 1114: Durand
- bef. 1108–aft. 1112: Hugh
- ?–bef. 1114 (d.): Gerard
- bef. 1115–bef. 1114 (d.): William
- bef. 1135–bef. 1128: William of Beverley
- bef. 1133–aft. 1125: William son of Tole

==== Archdeacons of York ====
- bef. 1128–1148 (d.): Walter of London
- bef. 1153–aft. 1157: Robert Butevilain (became Dean of York)
- bef. 1162–aft. 1154: Geoffrey
- bef. 1171–1194 (d.): Ralph d'Aunay
- bef. 1195–1199 (res.): Peter of Dinan (became Bishop of Rennes)
- 1196–aft. 1201: Adam of Thorner
- bef. 1220–aft. 1228: Sampson
- bef. 1231–aft. 1231: Walter
- bef. 1241–1245 (d.): Laurence of Lincoln
- bef. 1248–aft. 1248: Sewal de Bovil (became Dean of York)
- aft. 1249–aft. 1252: William Langton (alias William of Rotherfield; became Dean of York)
- 1262: John de Langeton the elder
- bef. 1262–aft. 1267: Reiner of Skipton (Reginald)
- 28 April 1267–May 1268 (res.): Godfrey Giffard (became Bishop of Worcester)
- bef. 1270–1275 (res.): Robert Burnell (became Bishop of Bath and Wells)
- bef. 1277–bef. 1283: Thomas de Wythen
- 13 February 1283–aft. 1287: Walter of Gloucester
- 5 December 1288 – 1300 (res.): William de Hambleton (became Dean of York)

=== Late Medieval ===
- 1300–bef. 1321 (res.): Aymo of Savoy
- 1321–30 September 1361 (d.): Peter Cardinal de Prés (cardinal-priest of Santa Pudenziana)
- 1361–29 September 1369 (d.): Stephen Cardinal Albert (cardinal-deacon of Santa Maria in Aquiro)
- 1370–27 August 1372 (d.): Philippe Cardinal de Cabassoles (Cardinal-Bishop of Sabina; also Archdeacon of Leicester from 1371)
- 1373–1374 (d.): Peter Cardinal Gomez de Albornoz (cardinal-priest of Santa Prassede)
- 1374–22 July 1376 (d.): Simon Cardinal Langham OSB (former archbishop of Canterbury; Cardinal-Bishop of Palestrina and Archdeacon of Wells)
- 1376–bef. 1380 (deprived): Gui Cardinal de Maillesec (cardinal-priest of Santa Croce in Gerusalemme)
- 1380–bef. 1383 (res.): John de Thoern
- 1383–bef. 1387 (res.): Peter Cardinal Corsini (Cardinal-Bishop of Porto)
- aft. 1387–18 June 1405 (d.): Francis Cardinal Carboni (cardinal-priest of Santa Susanna)
- 1388–1405 (res.): Richard Conyngston
- 1405–1412: Francis Cardinal Uguccioni (cardinal-priest of Santi Quattro Coronati; probably never gained possession)
- 1405–1412: Roger Coryngham
- 2 April 1412–bef. 1435 (d.): William Pilton
- 1412–1414: Raynald Cardinal de Brancatiis (cardinal-deacon of Santi Vito e Modesto)
- 1412–27 July 1414 (res.): Francis Cardinal Zarabella (cardinal-deacon of Santi Cosma e Damiano)
- 21 June 1435 – 1436 (res.): William Felter (became Dean of York)
- 1436–1442 (res.): Thomas Kempe (became Archdeacon of Richmond)
- 4 December 1442–bef. 1470 (d.): Andrew Holes
- 1470–bef. 1478 (d.): Thomas Chippenham
- 14 February 1478–bef. 1497 (d.): Ralph Booth
- 1497–bef. 1504 (res.): Henry Carnebull
- 12 June 1504–bef. 1515 (res.): John Aleyne (or Carver), Archdeacon of Middlesex
- 15 May 1515 – 1516 (res.): Brian Higden (became Dean of York)
- 18 August 1516 – 1522 (d.): Hugh Ashton
- 1523–bef. 1540 (d.): Thomas Wynter (also Dean of Wells 1525–1529, Archdeacon of Richmond 1526–1529, Archdeacon of Suffolk 1526–1529, Archdeacon of Norfolk 1529–1530 and Archdeacon of Cornwall from 1537)
- 1540–bef. 1544 (d.): Thomas Westbie

=== Early modern ===
- 15 January 1544 – 1560 (deprived): George Palmes (deprived)
- 1560–29 April 1568 (d.): John Stokes
- 1568–6 December 1575 (res.): William Chaderton
- 7 December 1575–bef. 1598 (d.): Robert Ramsden
- 15 October 1598 – 5 October 1600 (d.): Christopher Gregorie
- 8 October 1600–May 1617 (d.): Roger Acroide
- 2 June 1617 – 1624 (res.): Henry Hooke
- 19 March 1624 – 1641 (d.): Henry Wickham
- 1641–13 October 1663 (d.): Richard Marshe (also Dean of York from 1660)
- 16 October 1663 – 1 August 1688 (d.): Edmund Diggle
- 1688–4 April 1720 (d.): Knightly Chetwood
- 23 May 1720 – 22 May 1730 (d.): Charles Blake
- 26 November 1730 – 4 September 1751 (res.): Thomas Hayter (also Bishop of Norwich from 1749; later Bishop of London)
- 5 September 1751 – 14 December 1776 (d.): Edmund Pyle
- 1777–10 July 1786 (d.): William Cooper
- 2 August 1786 – 28 June 1794 (res.): Charles Cooper
- 9 July 1794 – 17 August 1837 (d.): Robert Markham
- 27 September 1837 – 25 August 1845 (d.): Stuart Corbett
- 11 October 1845 – 31 December 1866 (res.): Stephen Creyke

=== Late modern ===
- 1867–1874 (res.): Basil Jones, Vicar of Bishopthorpe (became Bishop of St David's)
- 1874–6 February 1888 (d.): Frederick Watkins, Rector of Long Marston
- 1888–1923 (ret.): Robert Crosthwaite, Vicar of St Lawrence with St Nicholas, York until 1885, then Rector of Bolton Percy; also Bishop suffragan of Beverley from 1889
- 1923–1933 (res.): Cecil Cooper, Vicar of St Michael le Belfrey, York until 26 (became Dean of Carlisle)
- 1933–1946 (ret.): Arthur England
- 1946–1947 (res.): Thomas Layng, Rector of Burnby and Nunburnholme
- 1947–1957 (res.): George Townley (became Bishop suffragan of Hull)
- 1957–1972 (ret.): Charles Forder, Rector of Sutton-on-Derwent until 1963, then Rector of Holy Trinity Micklegate until 1966 (afterwards archdeacon emeritus)
- 1972–1988 (ret.): Leslie Stanbridge (afterwards archdeacon emeritus)
- 1988–1999 (ret.): George Austin (afterwards archdeacon emeritus)
- 1999–2012 (ret.): Richard Seed, Rector of Holy Trinity Micklegate from 2000 and priest-in-charge, St Mary Bishophill Junior, 2000–2004 (afterwards archdeacon emeritus)
- 2013–2019: Sarah Bullock (became Bishop of Shrewsbury)
- 1 July – 19 October 2019 (Acting): John Weetman
- 19 October 2019 – 31 March 2025 (res.): Sam Rushton (previously Archdeacon of Cleveland, became CEO of Diocese of Lichfield)
- 1 April 2025 – present: Liz Hassall

== Sources ==
- Greenaway, Diana E. (1999), Fasti Ecclesiae Anglicanae 1066–1300, vol. 6, pp. 30–31
- Greenaway, Diana E. (1999), Fasti Ecclesiae Anglicanae 1066–1300, vol. 6, pp. 31–36
- Jones, B. (1963), Fasti Ecclesiae Anglicanae 1300–1541, vol. 6, pp. 17–19
- Horn, Joyce M.; Smith, David M. (1975), Fasti Ecclesiae Anglicanae 1541–1857, vol. 4, pp. 13–14
