= George Ford (cricketer) =

English cricketer

Personal information
- Full name: George John Ford
- Born: 24 July 1817; St Pancras, Middlesex, England
- Died: 18 January 1848 (aged 30); Hove, Sussex, England
- Batting: Unknown
- Relatives: William Ford (brother); Francis Ford (nephew); William Ford (nephew); Augustus Ford (nephew)

Domestic team information
- Years: Team
- 1837–1840: Oxford University
- 1839: Marylebone Cricket Club

Career statistics
Competition	First-class
Matches	1
Runs scored	130
Batting average	9.28
100s/50s	–/–
Top score	39
Catches/stumpings	5/–
- Source: Cricinfo, 8 March 2020

George John Ford (24 July 1817 – 12 January 1848) was an English first-class cricketer and clergyman.

The son of George Samuel Ford, he was born in July 1817 at St Pancras. He matriculated at Exeter College, Oxford in 1836, graduating B.A. in 1840, and M.A. in 1845.

Ford played first-class cricket for Oxford University. He made his debut against the Marylebone Cricket Club (MCC) at Lord's in 1837, with Ford making seven first-class appearances for Oxford to 1840. He also made two first-class appearances for the MCC against Oxford University and Surrey in 1839. In nine first-class matches, Ford scored 130 runs at an average of 9.28, with a high score of 39.

After graduating from Oxford, Ford took holy orders in the Church of England. His first ecclesiastical posting was as curate of Congresbury in Somerset, before becoming the curate of St Mary's, Hastings. He held the curacy there until his death at Hove in January 1848. His brother, William was a first-class cricket, in addition to three of his nephews, including Francis Ford who would go on to play Test cricket.
