= Arthur England (clergyman) =

Arthur Creyke England (1872–1946) was an Anglican clergyman in the first half of the twentieth century.

== Biography ==
England was born in Bolton Percy and educated at St John's College, Cambridge. After a curacies in Grimsby and Hull he held Incumbencies in Sculcoates, Hessle and Kirby Misperton. He was Rural Dean of Hull (1924–28) Rural Dean of Pickering (1928–33); Canon Missioner for the Diocese of York 1929–33; and Archdeacon of York and Treasurer of York Minster from 1933 until his death on 30 September 1946

Church of England titles
Preceded by Cecil Henry Hamilton Cooper	Archdeacon of York; 1933 – 1946	Succeeded by Thomas Malcolm Layng
