= Edward Ford (courtier) =

British courtier (1910–2006)

Lieutenant-Colonel Sir Edward Ford GCVO KCB ERD DL FRSA
- Born: Edward William Spencer Ford; 24 July 1910; Repton, Derbyshire, England
- Died: 19 November 2006 (aged 96)
- Known for: Courtier
- Spouse: Virginia Brand

Sir Edward William Spencer Ford GCVO KCB ERD DL FRSA (24 July 1910 – 19 November 2006) was a courtier in the Royal Households of King George VI and Queen Elizabeth II. He is perhaps best known for writing to Elizabeth II’s private secretary regarding the 40th year of her reign, having hoped that the Queen would experience an annus mirabilis but instead finding 1992 an annus horribilis. She used the phrase in a speech to describe a year in which one of her four children was divorced, two more formally separated from their spouses, and Windsor Castle caught fire.

== Family background ==
Ford was a fraternal twin. His family has strong connections with the Anglican church and with cricket. His father was the Very Reverend Lionel Ford, headmaster of Repton and later of Harrow, and Dean of York from 1926 to 1932; his mother Mary Catherine was a daughter of the Right Reverend Edward Stuart Talbot, Bishop of Winchester, and education campaigner Lavinia Lyttelton; an uncle was Neville Stuart Talbot Bishop of Pretoria; another uncle was a royal chaplain. His brother Neville Ford played cricket for Derbyshire, and three of his uncles played first-class cricket, including Francis Ford who played for England.

== Education ==
Ford was at West Downs School and was then a King's Scholar at Eton. He won an open scholarship to read Classics at New College, Oxford (where he was elected an Honorary Fellow in 1982). He obtained a first in Mods and second in Greats.

== Career ==
He was tutor to John Lascelles, son of Sir Alan Lascelles, Private Secretary to King George VI, in 1933. He was a Harmsworth scholar at Middle Temple, before tutoring Prince (later King) Farouk of Egypt from 1935–36. He was called to the Bar in 1937 and briefly practised law until 1939.

== Military service ==
Ford had been commissioned as a second lieutenant in supplementary reserve of the Grenadier Guards in 1936, and promoted to first lieutenant in 1939. He fought in World War II in France and Belgium, being evacuated from Dunkirk, and in Tunisia and Italy, and was mentioned in despatches twice. He was brigade major of the 10th Infantry Brigade and later of the 24th Guards Brigade, and was an instructor at the Staff College in Haifa, Israel.

After the war, at the invitation of Sir Alan Lascelles, he entered Royal Service as Assistant Private Secretary to King George VI, 1946–52, and then served in the same office to Elizabeth II until 1967. Ford was telephoned by the King's Private Secretary, Sir Alan Lascelles, with news of the King's death at Sandringham in February 1952, and Ford broke the news to the prime minister, Sir Winston Churchill, at 10 Downing Street and then to Queen Mary, the King's mother, at Marlborough House. He was an Extra Equerry to the Queen from 1955 until his death. He became a close friend of Group Captain Peter Townsend, an equerry whose love affair with Princess Margaret caused a crisis early in Queen Elizabeth's reign.

== Resignation ==
Ford resigned from the Royal Household in 1967, after Sir Michael Adeane, Lascelles' successor, asked him to move to the household of the Prince of Wales to make way for the younger Philip Moore. He was secretary of the Pilgrim Trust from 1967 to 1975, and also managed the estate of his late father-in-law, Lord Brand, at Eydon Hall in Northamptonshire. Later, he was Secretary and Registrar of the Order of Merit (for which he received an honorarium of £100) from 1975–2003.

== Annus Horribilis ==
Ford used the Latin phrase "annus horribilis" in a sympathetic letter to the Queen in 1992, after a series of unfortunate events, including a major fire in Windsor Castle. In a later television documentary to mark the 40th anniversary of the Queen's accession, Ford chided himself for a grammatical error, saying that, in order to describe a horrible year, he properly should have written "annus horrendus". The Queen later used the phrase in a speech: "1992 is not a year on which I shall look back with undiluted pleasure. In the words of one of my more sympathetic correspondents, it has turned out to be an 'Annus Horribilis'."

== Honours ==
For his service to the Crown, Edward Ford was appointed Member of the Royal Victorian Order (MVO) in 1949, Companion of the Order of the Bath (CB) in 1952, knighted as Knight Commander of the Royal Victorian Order (KCVO) in 1957, advanced to Knight Commander of the Order of the Bath (KCB) in 1967 and promoted to the Knight Grand Cross of the Royal Victorian Order (GCVO) in 1998. He received the Emergency Reserve Decoration (ERD) in 1987, having long served as a reserve officer, and reaching the rank of Lieutenant-Colonel. He was also a fellow of the Royal Society of Arts, served as Deputy Lieutenant of Northamptonshire (DL) and High Sheriff of Northamptonshire. He was Prime Warden of the Goldsmiths' Company in 1979.

He was the literary executor of Sir Alan Lascelles. Despite the sensitive nature of their contents, he managed to secure permission for Sir Alan's wartime diaries to be published. King's Counsellor was launched in 2006, a few weeks before his death.

== Personal life ==
He married his wife, Virginia, in 1949, the widow of John Metcalfe Polk. She was the daughter of the banker Robert Henry Brand, 1st Baron Brand and Phyllis Langhorne, a sister of Nancy Astor. His wife died in 1995.

== Death ==
He died in London, on 19 November 2006, aged 96. He was survived by his and Virginia's two sons Richard and David, and John Robert Polk a stepson. A second stepson Robert B Polk predeceased him.
