= Richard I (abbot of Fountains) =

Richard I (died 1139) was an English Benedictine and Cistercian, the first abbot of Fountains.

== Life ==
He was prior of St Mary's Abbey, York. In 1132 he found that the sacristan Richard II (died 1143) and six other brothers of the house had entered into a bond that they would strive after a stricter life and, if possible, join the Cistercian order, established in England about three years earlier. Richard, who had the good opinion of Thurstan, the Archbishop of York, joined the new movement.

Difficulties arose with the abbot of St Mary's, Geoffrey. He called in monks from Marmoutier then in York, and others, and denounced Richard and his friends. The Archbishop visited the abbey with several of his chapter and other attendants on 9 October, and the abbot refusing to admit his attendants, who were secular clerks, there was a quarrel. In the end Thurstan left with Richard and the other twelve monks of his party, empty-handed. On 26 December he established the new community at what would become Fountains, at Skeldale near Ripon, and gave them the site and some land in the neighbourhood. Richard was chosen abbot, and he and his monks built themselves huts round a great elm. When the winter was over they sent a messenger to Bernard of Clairvaux, asking to be received into the Cistercian order. He sent them a monk from Clairvaux to instruct them in the rule, and wrote a letter to Richard.

After two years the community's hopes of establishing themselves were failing, and Richard went to Clairvaux Abbey and begged Bernard to find them a settlement in France. He assigned them Longué (now in Haute-Marne) until some place could be found for them permanently. On Richard's return, however, he found that Hugh, the dean of York, had joined the convent and brought financial security to it. Two canons of York followed the dean, and the convent entered on a period of prosperity.

Richard received a charter of confirmation from King Stephen in 1135, and the same year the convent appears to have been admitted into the number of Cistercian abbeys. In 1137 Richard sent out a body of monks to colonise Newminster in Northumberland, founded by Ralph de Merlay, and in the same year he received a gift of Haverholme, near Sleaford in Lincolnshire, from Alexander of Lincoln, and another colony from Fountains was sent, founding Haverholme Priory.

When Alberic of Ostia, the papal legate came to England in 1138, he asked for Richard to help. On the legate's departure Thurstan sent Richard with him to Rome, partly on the archbishop's business, and partly to attend the Second Council of the Lateran to be held there the following year. Richard died at Rome on 30 April 1139.
