= Forder =

Forder is a surname. Notable people with the surname include:

- Anna Forder (born 1951), Canadian pair skater
- Charles Forder (1907–2008), British Anglican archdeacon
- Damian Forder (born 1979), British cricketer
- Henry Forder (1889–1981), New Zealand mathematician
- James Forder (born 1964), British economist
- Robert Forder (1884–1901), English publisher and bookseller
