= Richard I (disambiguation) =

Richard I was King of England from 1189 to 1199.

Richard I may also refer to:

- Richard I of Aquila (often Richard I of Aquila) (died 1111), consul and duke of Gaeta, ruling 1104 or 1105 – 1111 (his death)
- Richard I of Capua (died 1078), count of Aversa (1049–1078), prince of Capua (1058–1078, as Richard I) and duke of Gaeta (1064–1078)
- Richard I, Duke of Normandy (933–996), also known as Richard the Fearless, Duke of Normandy 942–996
- Richard I (abbot of Fountains) (died 1139), English Cistercian
- Richard I of Beaumont (died 1201)
- Richard I (play) or Richard Coeur de Lion: An historical romance, a 1786 semi-opera with an English text by John Burgoyne set to music by Thomas Linley the Elder

== See also ==
- Richard
