= Richard Layton =

English churchman, jurist and diplomat

Richard Layton or Leighton (1500?–1544) was an English churchman, jurist and diplomat, dean of York and a principal agent of Henry VIII and Thomas Cromwell in the dissolution of the monasteries.

== Life ==
=== Early life ===
He was born about 1500, son of William Layton of Dalemain in Cumberland, one of a very large family. He was kinsman of Robert Aske, leader of the northern rebellion, and of George Joye, a prebendary of Ripon. He was educated at Cambridge, where he proceeded B.C.L. in 1522, and afterwards LL.D., and he took holy orders. According to Gilbert Burnet he was in the service of Thomas Wolsey at the same time as Cromwell.

=== Career ===
In 1522 Layton received the sinecure rectory of Stepney; on 9 May 1523 he became prebendary of Kentish Town; he was admitted an advocate 5 June 1531. On 4 July 1531 he seems to have been living at East Farnham in Hampshire, but on 1 September 1533 became dean of the collegiate church of Chester-le-Street, County Durham. He was made chaplain of St. Peter's in the Tower of London 15 March 1534, but this preferment required residence, and he resigned it in 1535. He was installed archdeacon of Buckingham 27 October 1534, but continued to live in London and had difficulties with his bishop, John Longland. In 1535 Layton became rector of Sedgefield in Durham, and soon afterwards rector of Brington, Northamptonshire, a clerk in chancery, and clerk to the privy council. On 1 April 1535 he had lodgings in Paternoster Row.

==== Ecclesiastical Reformer ====
In 1533, Layton became an agent of ecclesiastical reforms under Thomas Cromwell. That December he went to Syon Abbey. Two years later, he played an instrumental role in the questioning of Thomas More and John Fisher. In July 1535, after the execution of More, Layton travelled to the university of Oxford with the Welshman John ap Rice to examine that institution. They remained there a few weeks and returned in September for several days, at which point they established changes in the order of studies and discipline of the university. They founded new lecturerships. Layton and Rice approved the new learning that had taken root at Oxford, and disliked the traditional form of education known as scholasticism.

Layton wrote to Cromwell, 'We have sett Dunce [Duns Scotus] in Bocardo and have utterly banished hym Oxforde for ever, with all his blinde glosses, and is nowe made a common servant to evere man, faste nailede up upon postes in all common howses of easement: id quod oculis meis vidi'('I saw it with my own eyes.').

==== Visitation of the monasteries ====
In early 1535, King Henry VIII ordered a survey of the finances of the church, entitled as Valor Ecclesiasticus (Latin: "church valuation"). Beginning in January, government-appointed commissioners collected vital information about the financial state of nearly all ecclesiastical institutions in the realm. The commissioners examined church documents and account books and reported their findings to the crown.

Layton and Thomas Legh visited a series of monasteries, beginning on 1 August 1535. Their visitations started with Evesham Abbey and continued with Bath (7 August) and the west. At first Legh found Layton lenient, but he grew stricter in the administration of the oaths of the royal supremacy. He passed to Bruton Abbey, Glastonbury Abbey (whence he sent specimens of the celebrated Glastonbury Thorn to Thomas Cromwell), and Bristol, back to Oxford (12 September). On 26 September 1535 he was at Waverley in Sussex, and proceeded to Chichester, Arundel, Lewes and Battle, and entering Kent, reached Allingborne on 1 October. On 23 October he was at Canterbury, and was nearly burnt to death in a fire at St Augustine's Abbey.

After returning to his lodgings in Paternoster Row, he was ordered, at his own request, to visit the northern houses. On the way he visited monasteries in Bedfordshire, Northamptonshire and Leicestershire. He collected confessions of every kind of iniquity, while enriching himself. On 22 December 1535 he met Legh at Lichfield, reached York 11 January, and proceeded to the visitation of the Yorkshire houses. Layton afterwards traversed Northumberland, and came back to London by way of Chester.

The reports of Layton and his companions, submitted with other similar material to the parliament which met 4 February 1536, sealed the fate of the smaller houses. The punishment of Layton was one of the demands of the Pilgrimage of Grace.

In May 1536 Layton took part in the trial of Anne Boleyn; through the autumn he was busy assisting in the repression of the northern rebels; and when the rising was over he was a commissioner to hear confessions. From December 1536 until the end of April 1537 he sat to try the prisoners. On 24 March 1537 he and Starkey received a summons from the king to confer with the bishops on the morrow (Palm Sunday) on theological points.

==== Participation in the First Suppression (1536) ====
Layton became an important figure in the eradication of traditional religious houses, starting in 1537.

In 1534, an act of Parliament had made Henry VIII the Supreme Head of the Church. His first major action was to target the religious houses throughout the realm. Beginning in 1536 and intensifying his efforts in 1539, he disbanded monasteries, priories, convents and friaries in England, Wales and Ireland. The King appropriated their income, disposed of their assets, and provided for their former members and functions through a set of administrative and legal processes known as The Dissolution of the Monasteries.

As a chief commissioner of the Dissolution, Layton was occupied in the east and south of England, managing the surrender of various abbeys. He asked Thomas Wriothesley to recommend him for the registrarship of the Garter on 19 July 1537. On 21 July 1537 he was collated to the rectory of Harrow-on-the-Hill, where his recreations were hawking and growing pears.

==== Participation in the Second Suppression (1539) ====
Layton was appointed to the prebend of Ulleskelf at York on 20 June 1539, and a month later to the deanery of York. In his new office, he authorised the destruction of the silver shrine of St. William.

In September 1539 he made an unannounced visit to Glastonbury Abbey, accompanied by two other commissioned officers, Richard Pollard and Thomas Moyle. The three commissioners had come to interrogate the abbot, Richard Whiting. However, Layton and the others were forced to arrest Whiting, who was now advanced in years, after the abbot resisted their authority. Whiting was executed as a traitor in mid-November.

In the same year, Layton interceded for the continuance of the sanctuary at Bewley.

=== Later career ===
In 1540 he was one of the divines appointed to examine the validity of the king's marriage with Anne of Cleves.

Some time in 1543 he was employed in unravelling the conspiracy against Thomas Cranmer, and in the same year was appointed to succeed William Paget as English ambassador at Paris. The expectation of war with France, however, led to his transference to Brussels, where he arrived 10 December 1543. While at Ghent in February 1544 his health began to fail.

=== Death ===
He died at Brussels some time in June 1544. After his death it was found that he had pawned plate belonging to the chapter at York, and the chapter had to redeem it.

== Notes ==
Church of England titles
Preceded by Brian Higden	Dean of York; 1539–1544	Succeeded by Nicholas Wotton
