= Stephen Creyke =

English Anglican priest

Stephen Creyke (13 October 1796 – 11 December 1883) was an English Anglican priest. He was Archdeacon of York from 1845 to 1866.

Creyke was born in Stonehouse, Plymouth, England, and was educated at Corpus Christi College, Oxford. He held livings at Beeford and Bolton Percy. He died in Bolton Percy, Yorkshire, England.

== Notes ==
Church of England titles
Preceded by Stuart Corbett	Archdeacon of York; 1845 – 1866	Succeeded by Basil Jones
