= Leslie Stanbridge =

The Venerable Leslie Stanbridge
- Archdeacon of York
- Church: Church of England
- Diocese: Diocese of York
- In office: 1972 to 1988
- Predecessor: Charles Forder
- Successor: George Austin

Orders
- Ordination: 1949 (deacon); 1950 (priest)

Personal details
- Born: Leslie Cyril Stanbridge; 19 June 1920 Bromley, Kent, England
- Died: 19 March 2015 (aged 94) New Earswick, York, England
- Denomination: Anglicanism
- Education: Bromley County Grammar School
- Alma mater: St John's College, Durham

Leslie Cyril Stanbridge (19 May 1920 – 19 March 2015) was a British Church of England priest. From 1972 to 1988, he was the Archdeacon of York in the Diocese of York.

== Early life and education ==
Stanbridge was born on 19 May 1920 in Bromley, Kent, England. He was educated at Bromley County Grammar School, an all-boys state grammar school in Bromley. He then matriculated into St John's College, Durham to study theology and train for ordained ministry. He graduated with a Bachelor of Arts (BA) degree in 1947 and undertook a further two years of training. Later, having returned to St John's a member of staff, he undertook postgraduate study and completed a Master of Arts (MA) degree in 1954.

== Ordained ministry ==
Stanbridge was ordained in the Church of England as a deacon in 1949 and as a priest in 1950. From 1949 to 1951, he served his curacy at Erith Parish Church (St John the Baptist's) in Erith in the Diocese of Rochester. In 1951, he returned to St John's College, Durham, his alma mater, as a tutor. He was also appointed the college chaplain in 1952.

In 1955, Stanbridge moved to the Diocese of York where he would stay for the rest of his life. He was Vicar of St Martin's Church, Hull between 1955 and 1964. From 1962 to 1974, he was also an Examining Chaplain to the Archbishop of York. He was Rector of St Mary the Virgin, Cottingham, East Riding of Yorkshire between 1964 and 1972. He was also Rural Dean of Kingston-upon-Hull between 1970 and 1972.

From 1968 to 2000, Stanbridge was made a Canon of York Minster. He continued his parish ministry for four years, before being appointed Archdeacon of York in 1972. He officially retired in 1988, but led an active retirement. He was Warden of the York Diocesan Readers' Association between 1988 and 1995, and was Succentor Canonicum at York Minster between 1988 and 2015.

On 19 March 2015, Stanbridge died at his home in New Earswick, York. A Requiem Eucharist was held for him at York Minster on 30 March 2015.
