= George Austin (priest) =

British Anglican priest (1931–2019)

The Venerable George Austin
- Archdeacon of York
- Church: Church of England
- Diocese: Diocese of York
- In office: 1988 to 1999
- Predecessor: Leslie Stanbridge
- Successor: Richard Seed

Orders
- Ordination: 1955 (deacon); 1956 (priest)

Personal details
- Born: George Bernard Austin; 16 July 1931
- Died: 30 January 2019 (aged 87)
- Denomination: Anglicanism
- Education: St David's College, Lampeter

George Bernard Austin (16 July 1931 – 30 January 2019) was a British Anglican priest, broadcaster and author. He was Archdeacon of York from 1988 to 1999.

Austin was educated at St David's College, Lampeter and Chichester Theological College. He was ordained deacon in 1955, and priest in 1956. After curacies in Chorley and Notting Dale he was at Dunstable Priory from 1961 to 1964. After that he held incumbencies at Eaton Bray, and (his final post before installation to the archidiaconate) Bushey Heath.

A contributor to BBC Radio 4's Thought for the Day programme, he was a prominent opponent of the ordination of women in the Anglican Communion.
