= Richard Marshe =

English priest

Richard Marshe was a 17th-century English priest.

Marshe was born at Finchampstead and educated at Queens' College, Cambridge. He was ordained in 1609. he became vicar of Birstall in 1614. He was a chaplain to Charles the First, a JP and a prebendary of Southwell Minster. He was Archdeacon of York from 1641; and dean of York from 1643, although he was not actually installed until after The Restoration. He was also vicar of Halifax.

Marshe died on 13 October 1663.
