= Theodore Ford =

British lawyer and judge

Sir Theodore Thomas Ford (25 September 1830 – 23 May 1920) was a British lawyer and judge. He served as Chief Justice of the Straits Settlements in the 19th century.

== Early life ==
Ford was born in Sandgate, Kent, the son of George Samuel Ford, an English solicitor and money lender, and his wife, Hannah Bramah, daughter of civil engineer Joseph Bramah. He was called to the Bar at the Middle Temple in 1866, and for three years worked on the staff of the Weekly Reporter in the Chancery Courts. In 1868, he joined the Western Circuit.

He married Ellen Elizabeth Watson, daughter of George Watson in 1859. There were several children.

== Legal appointments ==
He was appointed a Puisne Judge of the Supreme Court of the Straits Settlements in 1874 and became Chief Justice in 1886. He was knighted in 1888.

== Retirement and death ==
Ford retired to Upper Norwood in England in 1896.

He died in 1920 at the age of 91.

== Street name ==
Ford Street (between North Boat Quay and High Street) in Singapore was named after Ford. The street no longer exists and has been replaced by the High Street Centre.
