= Joseph Wood (schoolmaster) =

English clergyman and schoolmaster

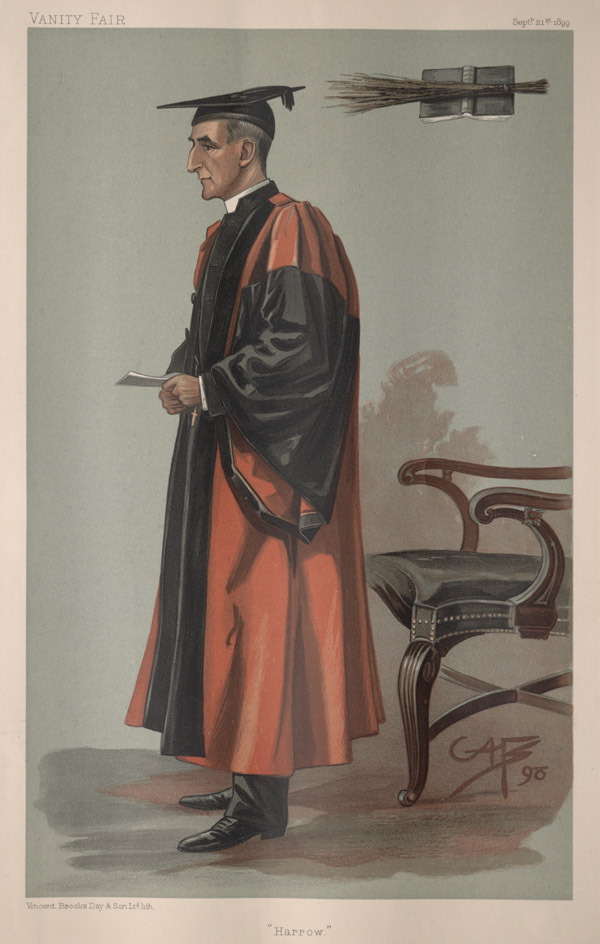
Joseph Wood, depicted in Vanity Fair in 1899

Joseph Wood MVO (1841 – 19 June 1923) was an English clergyman and schoolmaster, headmaster successively of Leamington College, Tonbridge School, and Harrow School, and while in London a prebendary of St Paul's Cathedral. He was headmaster of his three schools for forty years and in retirement was a Canon of Rochester Cathedral.

== Early life ==
Born in 1841, the second son of John Wood, gentleman, of Manchester, Wood was educated at Manchester Grammar School and matriculated at Balliol College, Oxford, on 13 April 1861, aged 18. He was an exhibitioner from that year until 1865, when he graduated BA, and was then Fereday Fellow of St John's College until 1868. He married in 1868, which meant that he had to give up his college fellowship, as there was then a rule of celibacy for dons at Oxford, except for the heads of colleges, which was not lifted until 1877.

Wood's younger brother Llewellyn Wood followed him to Oxford and also became a clergyman.

== Career ==
In 1870, Wood secured his first headmastership, at Leamington College, a position he held for twenty years, to 1890. He was then appointed to take charge at Tonbridge, where he stayed until 1898, when he was chosen to succeed James Welldon as Head Master of Harrow. The Spectator reported on the appointment "Dr Wood goes to Harrow with the reputation of an energetic and successful organiser... a brilliant scholar, an ardent patron of cricket."

As explained in Christopher Tyerman's history of Harrow School, Wood was a most unexpected choice, due to his age. Since the retirement of Thomas Thackeray in 1760, all headmasters of the school had been in their twenties or thirties when first appointed. Wood was already fifty-six and was twelve years older than the outgoing head, Welldon. He was left in the invidious position of trying to enforce a policy of compulsory retirement for all schoolmasters at the age of sixty, while himself continuing well beyond it, until he was sixty-eight. One of the unsuccessful candidates on the shortlist of 1898 was Lionel Ford, a young "coming man", who in the event was appointed to succeed Wood in 1910. When Wood retired, after twelve years at Harrow, he had been a headmaster for forty years.

In 1902, Wood acquired a De Dion-Bouton car and wrote enthusiastically in its praise: "The car, it is a marvel. These last six days have travelled, with our fill of persons, 750 miles." In May 1908, he was quoted in Pearson's Weekly on the subject of boys and beer: "Long experience has convinced me that boys are better, healthier, stronger, more able to do work, either physical or mental, without beer than with it."

Awarded the degree of Doctor of Divinity in 1879, Wood took holy orders while he was at Tonbridge and was a prebendary of St Paul's Cathedral, London, from 1907 to 1910, and then after he left Harrow was a Canon of Rochester Cathedral from 1911 until his death. In 1905, he was appointed a member of the Royal Victorian Order.

== Private life ==
In 1868 Wood married Caroline S. Hughes, a daughter of W. S. P. Hughes, of Northwich Hall, Worcestershire, a solicitor in Worcester. Their first son, Charles, was born in 1869, and was later headmaster of Sherborne School. A second son, John Barry Wood, later Political Secretary for India, was born in 1870. A third son, Cecil Strachan, born in 1872, died of wounds in France in December 1914. A fourth son, Frederick Joseph, born in 1877, was an officer of the 101st Grenadiers who saw active service in Palestine; a fifth, Edward Llewellyn Montague, born in 1878, joined a bank in India.

Wood died on 19 June 1923 at Margate, while he was a residentiary canon of Rochester.

== Notes ==
Preceded by T. B. Rowe	Headmaster of Tonbridge School; 1890–1898	Succeeded by C. C. Tancock
Preceded by James Welldon	Head Master of Harrow School; 1898–1910	Succeeded by Lionel Ford
