= William Stephens (dean of Winchester) =

Dean of Winchester

The Very Reverend William Richard Wood Stephens FSA

Dean of Winchester
- In office 1895–1902

Personal details
- Born: 5 October 1839 Gloucestershire
- Died: 22 December 1902 Winchester cathedral Deanery
- Spouse: Charlotte Jane Hook

William Richard Wood Stephens (5 October 1839 – 22 December 1902) was Dean of Winchester from 1895 to 1902.

== Career ==
Stephens was born in Gloucestershire in 1839 the youngest son of Charles Stephens, a banker. He was educated privately before proceeding to Balliol College, Oxford, where he graduated in 1862 with a first class in Literae humaniores.

Ordained deacon in 1864 and a priest in 1865. He started his career with a curacy in Staines. In 1866 he became the curate of Purley, Berkshire. On 31 August 1869 he married Charlotte Jane Hook, the youngest daughter of Walter Farquhar Hook, the Dean of Chichester. This was the start of long connexion with the Chichester Diocese. With Dean Hook's recommendation he became vicar of Mid-Lavant from 1870 to 1873, and lectured at Chichester Theological College from 1872 to 1876. In 1875 the Bishop of Chichester gave him the prebend of Wittering, in the cathedral, to which a theological lectureship was attached. In 1876 he became the Rector of Woolbeding, near Midhurst. He dedicated his 1876 book Memorials of the South Saxon See and Cathedral Church of Chichester to the memory of his father in law, who had died the previous year.

In 1880 he was chosen by the clergy of Chichester Diocese as their proctor in Convocation. Then in 1894, when the Dean of Winchester (George Kitchin) became Dean of Durham, Stephens was nominated to replace him as the dean of Winchester. In 1895 he was elevated to the Deanery at Winchester. When he took over it seems that the funds of the chapter were much reduced, and so 'private' resources were needed to support his position. He remained as dean of Winchester until his death.

Stephens was known for his philanthropy, spending his own money to have the church at Mid Lavant restored. He provided funds for the rebuilding of the chancel at Woolbeding and contributed to the repairs of the roof at Winchester Cathedral. He also spent a lot of time showing visitors around the cathedral and explaining its history. In 1895 he was recognised for his interest in history when he was elected a Fellow of the Society of Antiquaries.

In 1902 Stephens attended a mayoral banquet, in Winchester, where he consumed a single oyster. Unfortunately the beds, in Emsworth where the oysters were sourced, had been contaminated with raw sewage. Consequently, many of the guests, including Stephens, contracted food poisoning. His death in Winchester deanery, on 22 December 1902, about six weeks after the banquet, was attributed to typhoid fever as a result of eating an infected Emsworth oyster. He was buried in the graveyard of Winchester Cathedral on 27 December 1902.

His daughter Cecily Hatherly married in Winchester Cathedral on 27 January 1903 to Rev. Cecil Cooper, who later became Dean of Carlisle.

== Publications ==
- Life and Times of St John Chrysostom (1872)
- Memorials of the South Saxon See and Cathedral Church of Chichester (1876)
- Christianity and Islam (1877)
- Life and Letters of W.F. Hook, DD (1878, 4th edn. 1881)
- Memoir of William Page Baron Hatherley (1883)
- Hildebrand and His Times (1888)
- Helps to the Study of the Prayer-Book (1891)
- Life and Letters of E.A. Freeman, DCL (1895)
- Memoir of Richard Durnford, DD, sometime Bishop of Chichester (1899)
- Joint Editor with Rev. W. Hunt, A History of the English Church, (Journal), 1899-1910

== Notes ==
Church of England titles
| Preceded by George William Kitchin | Dean of Winchester; 1895–1902 | Succeeded by William Mordaunt Furneaux |
