= Christopher Gregorie =

English priest

The Venerable Christopher Gregorie was an Anglican priest in the late 16th century.

Gregorie was born in Warwickshire and educated at Magdalen College, Oxford. He was incorporated at Cambridge in 1579. Gregorie held livings at Cromwell, Kirby Misperton and Scrayingham. Hooke was Archdeacon of York from 1597 until his death in 1600.
