= Brian Higden =

Brian Higden was a priest in England during the 16th century.

Higden was educated at Pembroke College, Oxford. He held livings at Buckenham, Rickinghall and Nettleton. Higden was Archdeacon of York from 1515 to 1516; and Dean of York from 1516 until his death on 5 June 1539. He is buried in the churchyard at York Minster.
