= Henry Stuart (priest) =

English clergyman

Henry Venn Stuart (8 August 1864 – 12 January 1933) was an English clergyman, Dean of Carlisle from 1924 until his death in 1933.

Born in 1864, he was educated at Harrow and Caius College, Cambridge. Ordained in 1887, he was Curate of St Paul's, Burslem and then Vicar of St James's, Wolverhampton. From 1903 to 1924 he was Rural Dean of Stoke-upon-Trent. Elevated to the Deanery of Carlisle in 1924, he died on 12 January 1933.

Church of England titles
Preceded by Hastings Rashdall	Dean of Carlisle; 1924–1933	Succeeded by Cecil Cooper
