= Herbert Bate =

Anglican priest and theologian (1871–1941)

Herbert Newell Bate (31 May 1871 – 18 May 1941) was an Anglican priest and theologian who was Dean of York between 1932 and 1941. He was a prolific writer and authored many books and articles.

== Biography ==
Born in Brixton, Surrey, into a clerical family, the son of Rev. George Osborn Bate. He was educated at St Paul's School, London and Trinity College, Oxford, where he earned first-class honours in modern classics. He was ordained in 1896. He was a tutor of Keble College, Oxford until 1897 when he became a Fellow at Magdalen College, Oxford and Dean of Divinity. He held incumbencies at St Stephen's Hampstead and Christ Church, Lancaster Gate before eight years as a Canon at Carlisle Cathedral. He was Rector of Hadleigh, Suffolk and Dean of Bocking, Essex until his appointment to York.

Neuroscientist Mike Bate is his grandson (son of Herbert Bate's elder son, John Gordon Bate, an R.A.F. doctor, of Holmbury St Mary, Dorking).

== Bibliography ==
=== Books ===
- Bate, Rev. Herbert Newell; Peers, Charles Reed; Allen, H. P.; Déarmer, P. (1909). The book of the English Church pageant, Fulham Palace, June 10-16, 1909. London. OCLC 810902666.
- ——— (1910). The Healthful Spirit. London: Longmans, Green. OCLC 25063603.
- ——— (1918). The Sibylline Oracles: Books III-V. London: Longmans, Green. OCLC 220944462.
- ———; Marchant, James; Cunningham, Bertram Keir; David, A. A.; Dwelly, Frederick William; Hutton, William Holden; Martin, Robert Edmund; Masterman, John Howard Bertram; Temple, William; Williams, Garfield; Woods, E. T. (1926). The Future of the Church of England: A Volume of Essays. London: Longmans. OCLC 961022058.
- Bate, Rev Herbert Newell (1918). The Sibylline Oracles, Books 3-5, by the Rev. H.N. Bate, M.A. New York: The Macmillan Company. OCLC 1084894560.
- ——— (1927). Faith and order; proceedings of the World conference, Lausanne, August 3-21, 1927. New York: G.H. Doran Company. OCLC 2625122.
- ——— (1928). Reports of the World Conference on Faith and Order : Lausanne, Switzerland August 3 to 21, 1927. Boston, Mass.: World Conference on Faith and Order. Continuation Committee. OCLC 1430458241.
- ——— (1930). Report of the committee appointed by the Archbishops of Canterbury and York to consider the findings of the Lausanne Conference on Faith and Order, presented February 1930. Westminster: Church Assembly; W.H. Smith pr. OCLC 931107015.
- Turner, C. H.; Bate, H. N. (1931). Catholic and Apostolic : Collected Papers. London, Milwaukee: A.R. Mowbray; Morehouse Pub. Co. OCLC 5043794.
- ——— (1931). A Bibliography of Literature Dealing with Subjects with which the Faith and Order Movement is Concerned. Ipswich: W.E. Harrison, Ancient House Press. OCLC 9104625.
- Turner, C. H.; Bate, H. N. (1931). Catholic and Apostolic Collected Papers. London, Milwaukee: Morehouse. OCLC 173467703.
- Gray, Edwin; Raine, Angelo; Bate, H. N.; Gray, Almira (1933). The Mansion House of the Treasurers of York Minster, Now Treasurer's House and Gray's Court. York: Ben Johnson. OCLC 931373999.
- ——— (1934). Frank Edward Brightman, 1856-1932. London: Milford. OCLC 24684541.
- ———; Hodgson, Leonard; Brown, Ralph W. (1934). Convictions. A selection from the responses of the churches to the report of the World Conference on Faith and Order, held at Lausanne in 1927. London, New York: Macmillan. OCLC 1440754.
- Harrison, Frederick; Bate, H. N. (1935). Guide book to York Minster. York: Dean & Chapter. OCLC 931113480.
- ———; Harrison, Frederick (1937). English Manuscripts of the Fourteenth Century, c.1250 to 1400. London: New York, Studio. OCLC 1283804651.
- ——— (1937). Preces in Sacra synodo provinciae Eboracensis recitandae (in Latin). Oxford: Oxford U. P. OCLC 988848948.
- ———; Eeles, F. C. (1946). Thoughts on the shape of the liturgy. London: A.R. Mowbray. OCLC 12030887.
- ——— (1956). A guide to the Epistles of Saint Paul. London: Longmans, Green and Co. OCLC 16817431.
- ——— (1956). History of the Church to A. D. 325. London: Rivingtons. OCLC 1260462268.

=== Articles ===
- Bate, Rev. Herbert Newell (1902). "New Lights on the Catholic Epistles". The Journal of Theological Studies. III (12): 622–628. doi:10.1093/jts/os-III.12.622. ISSN 0022-5185.
- ——— (1903). "New Testament". The Journal of Theological Studies. IV (14): 301–309. doi:10.1093/jts/os-IV.14.301. ISSN 0022-5185.
- "Book Review: The Sibylline Oracles". The Biblical World. LIII (327). 1919. OCLC 9970447819.
- ——— (1922). "The Critical Work of Johannes Weiss: (I.)". Theology. 5 (28): 216–224. doi:10.1177/0040571X2200502803. ISSN 0040-571X.
- ——— (1922). "The Critical Work of Johannes Weiss (II.)". Theology. 5 (29): 262–269. doi:10.1177/0040571X2200502903. ISSN 0040-571X.
- ——— (1922). "Some Technical Terms of Greek Exegesis". The Journal of Theological Studies. XXIV (59). OCLC 9979138323.
- ——— (1927). "The 'Shorter Text' of St Luke XXII:15". The Journal of Theological Studies. XXVIII (362). OCLC 9979121458.
- ——— (1933), "If All the World Were Paper", Journal of the English Folk Dance and Song Society, I (111), OCLC 9982367496
- ——— (1938). "Cathedral Music—A Plea for Consideration". Theology. 37 (221): 283–290. doi:10.1177/0040571X3803722103. ISSN 0040-571X.
- ——— (1938). "Doctrine in the Church of England". Theology. 37 (219): 134–141. doi:10.1177/0040571X3803721902. ISSN 0040-571X.
- ——— (1939). "Book Review: Leitfaden zur christlichen Lehre". The Journal of Theological Studies. 40 (213). OCLC 9979013724.

=== Encyclopedia ===
- Bate, Rev. Herbert Newell (2004). "Turner, Cuthbert Hamilton (1860–1930), ecclesiastical historian and New Testament scholar". In Brown, Robert (ed.). Oxford Dictionary of National Biography (online ed.). Oxford University Press. doi:10.1093/ref:odnb/36582. ISBN 978-0-19-861412-8. (Subscription, Wikipedia Library access or UK public library membership required.)

Church of England titles
Preceded by Lionel George Bridges Justice Ford	Dean of York; 1932–1941	Succeeded by Eric Milner Milner-White
