= Horace A. Ford =

British archer

- Born: 1822; England
- Died: 24 June 1880; Bath
- Occupation: target archers
- Known for: won the Grand National Archery Meeting held in the United Kingdom.

Horace A. Ford (1822–1880) was a target archer.

== Biography ==
Horace Alfred Ford began participating in archery in 1845, and four years later won the Grand National Archery Meeting held in the United Kingdom. He proceeded to win an unmatched, eleven consecutive championships, and a twelfth "comeback" win. His high score – that of 1271 in the Double York Round in 1857 – remained archery's high mark for over 70 years.

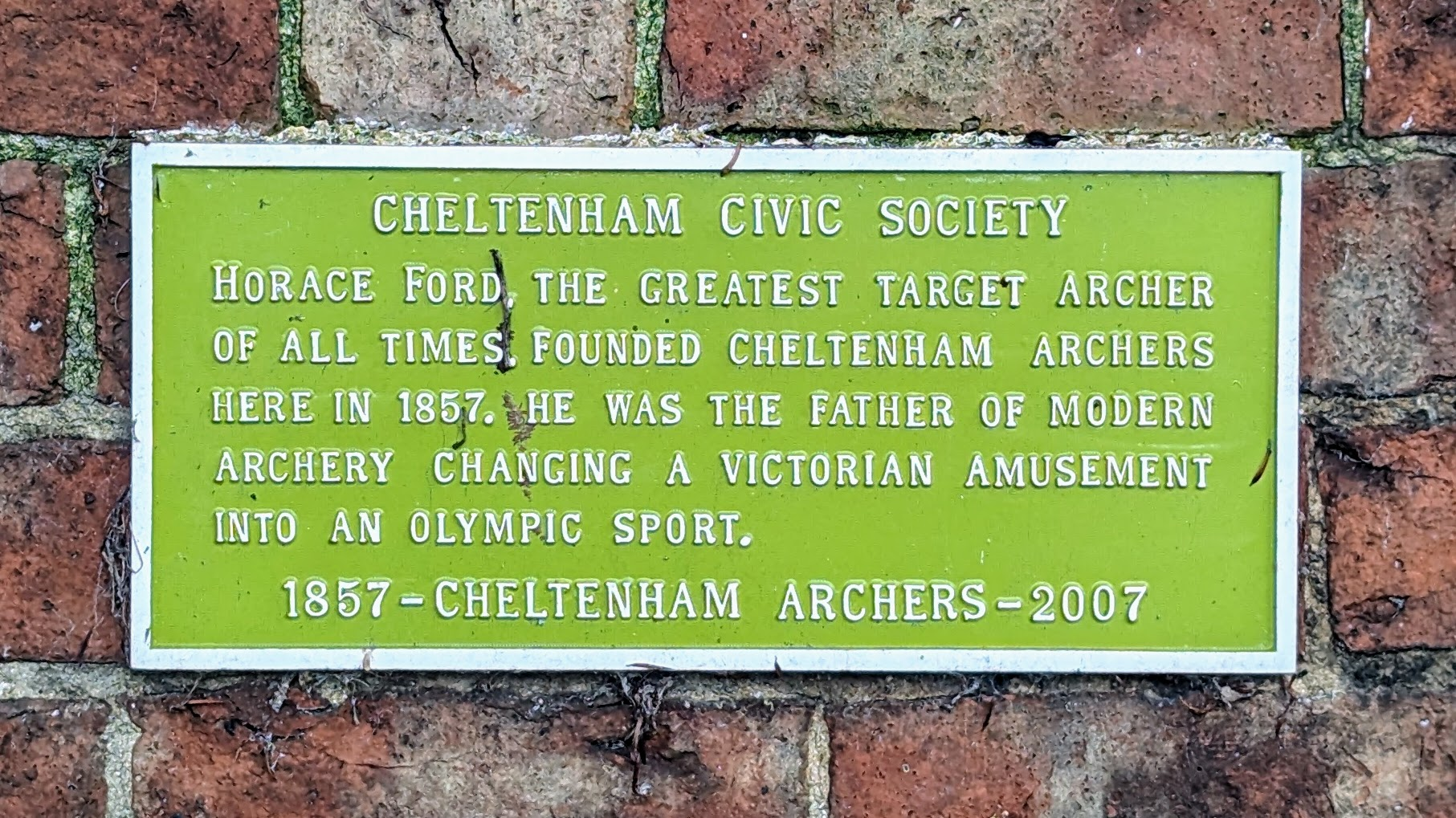
Plaque to Ford in Cheltenham.

Ford founded the Cheltenham Archers in 1857. He is also the author of Archery: Its Theory and Practice.

Several members of his family were cricketers, including Francis Ford. His father was solicitor and bill discounter George Samuel Ford.

Ford owned, in partnership with his father and brother, the Bryndu Colliery from 1842 and was a director of the Bristol and South Wales Railway Waggon Company (Limited).

Ford died in Bath, England on the 24 June 1880.

== Victories ==
Grand Archery Meeting Birmingham 1858, 1868
Grand Archery Meeting Hastings 1867
Grand Crystal Palace Archery Meeting 1859, 1861, 1863, 1867
Grand Leamington and Midland Archery Meeting 1855, 1856, 1857, 1858, 1860, 1861, 1862, 1863, 1867, 1868, 1869
Grand National Archery Meeting 1849, 1850, 1851, 1852, 1853, 1854, 1855, 1856, 1857, 1858, 1859, 1867
Grand Western Archery Meeting 1863, 1868

== Bibliography ==
Archery - Its theory and practice (1856)
Archery - Its theory and practice 2nd Edition (1859)
Archery during my years of championship (1864)
Archery - Its theory and practice American Edition (1880)
