= Henry Justice Ford =

British artist (1860–1941)

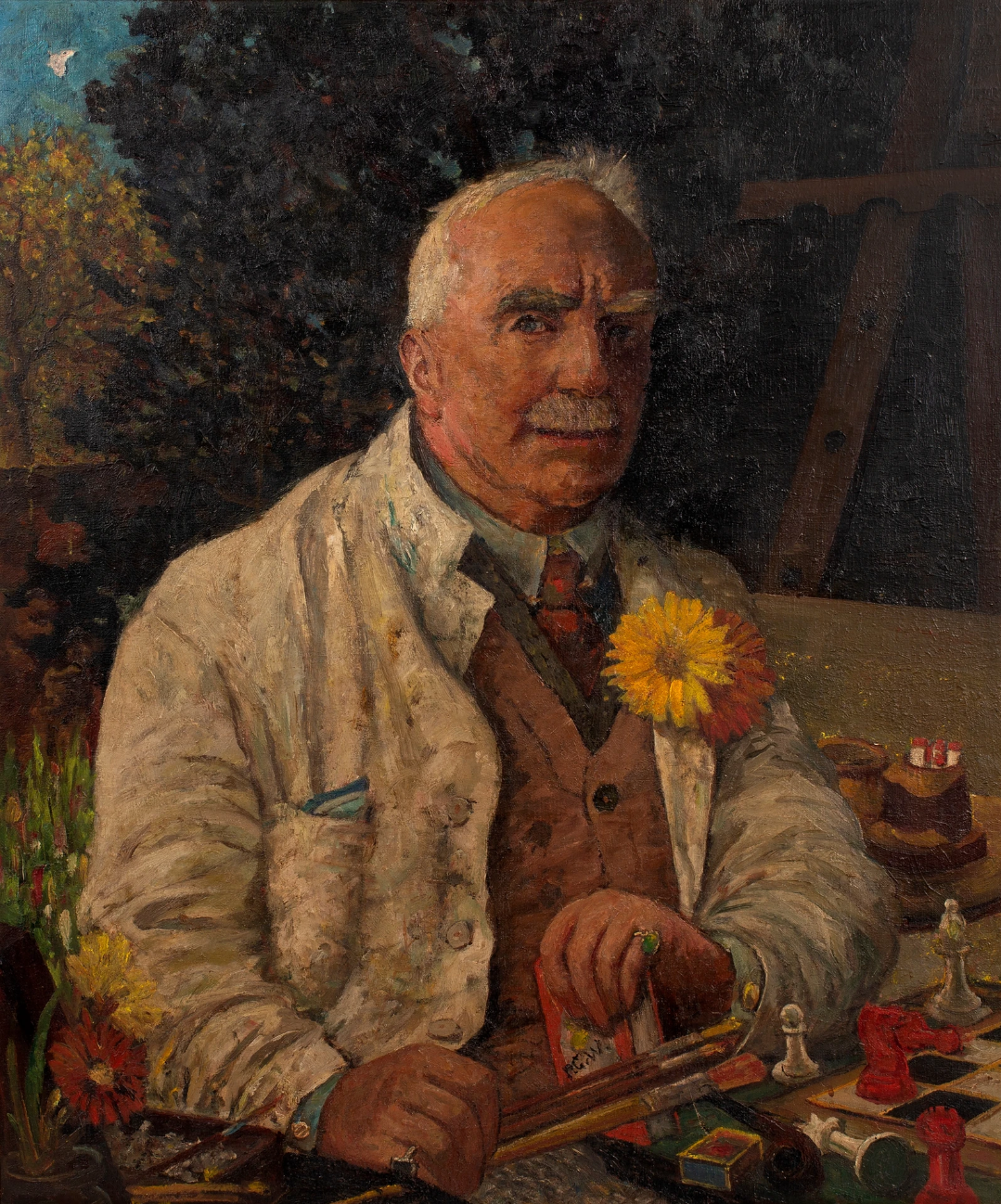
Self portrait by Henry Justice Ford, c. 1938

Henry Justice Ford (1860 – 1941) was a prolific English artist and illustrator, active from 1886 through to the late 1920s. He came to public attention when he provided the illustrations for Andrew Lang's Fairy Books, sold worldwide in the 1880s and 1890s.

== Early years ==
Henry Justice Ford was the son of Katherine Mary Justice and William Augustus Ford, a solicitor; his paternal grandfather was George Samuel Ford, a well known bill discounter. His father and many of his family were cricketers. His father wrote several articles and books on the subject, and Ford's brother, Francis Ford (1866-1940), played for England in an Ashes series in Australia.

He was educated at Repton School and Clare College, Cambridge - where he gained a first class in the Classical Tripos in 1882. He returned to London to study at the Slade School of Fine Art and later, at the Bushey School of Art, under the German-born Hubert von Herkomer.

== Career ==
In 1892, Ford began exhibiting paintings of historical subjects and landscapes at the Royal Academy of Art exhibitions. However it was his illustrations for such books as The Arabian Nights Entertainments (Longmans 1898), Kenilworth (TC & EC Jack 1900), and A School History of England by C. R. L. Fletcher and Rudyard Kipling (Clarendon Press 1911) that provided Ford with both income and fame.

== Personal life ==
At the age of 61, Ford surprised his friends by marrying a woman some thirty-five years younger. She was Emily Amelia Hoff (née Rose), a widow whose first husband had been killed in the Battle of Neuve Chapelle in March 1915. Following the marriage in Kensington Register Office in February 1921, Henry and Emily Ford settled down in Bedford Gardens, Kensington for several years and, in 1927, the couple adopted a child, June Mary Magdelene Ford. The seated model in his painting 'Remembering Happier Things' resembles Emily.

His love of cricket led Henry Justice Ford to play regularly at the playwright J. M. Barrie's Allahakbarrie Cricket Club. This in turn led him to create the well-known map of Kensington Gardens in Barrie's The Little White Bird. Further, he designed the costume for the character of Peter Pan when Barrie's play was staged in the West End for the first time in 1904. Ford's wide-ranging interests brought him into contact and friendship with many well-known figures of his time, including the writers P. G. Wodehouse, Sir Arthur Conan Doyle and A. E. W. Mason.

== Gallery ==
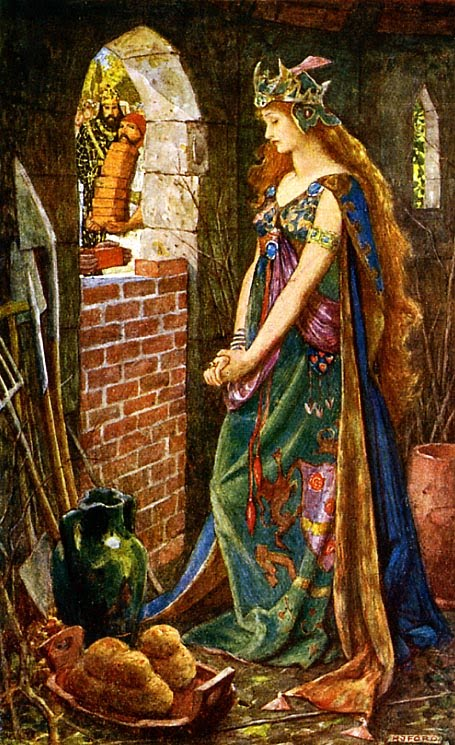
The Princess Imprisoned in the Summerhouse from Andrew Lang's The Green Fairy Book (1892)

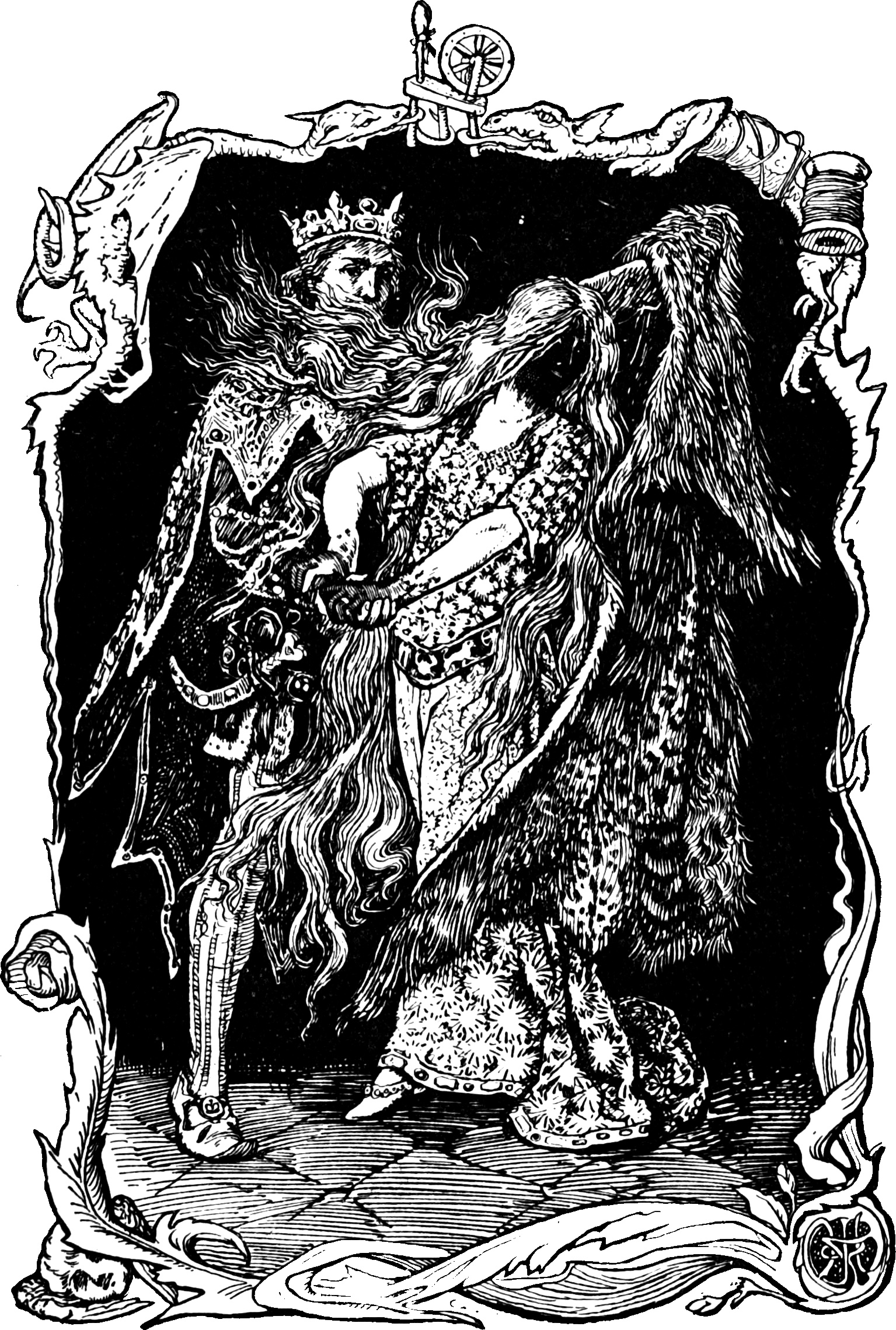
Allerleirauh. The Green Fairy Book. (1892)

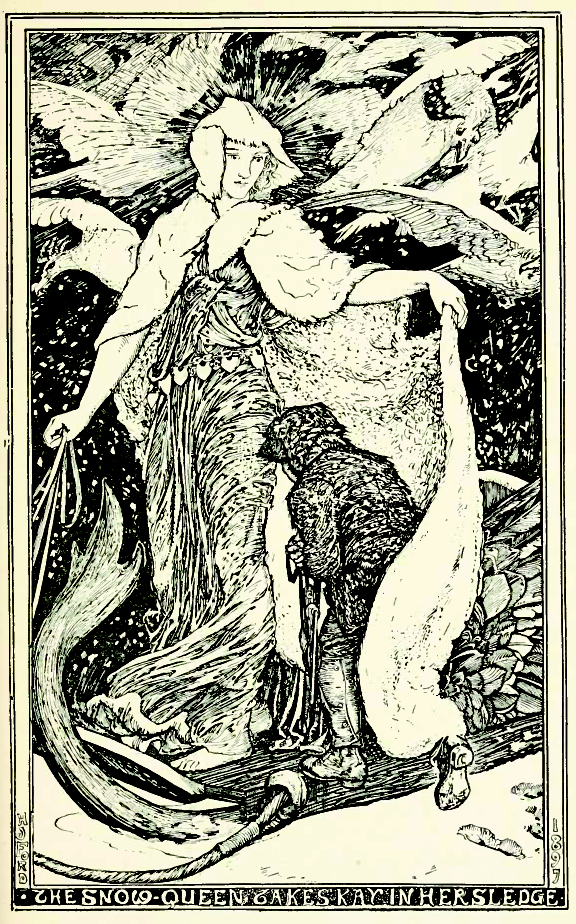
The Snow Queen takes Kay in her sledge. The Pink Fairy Book. (1897)

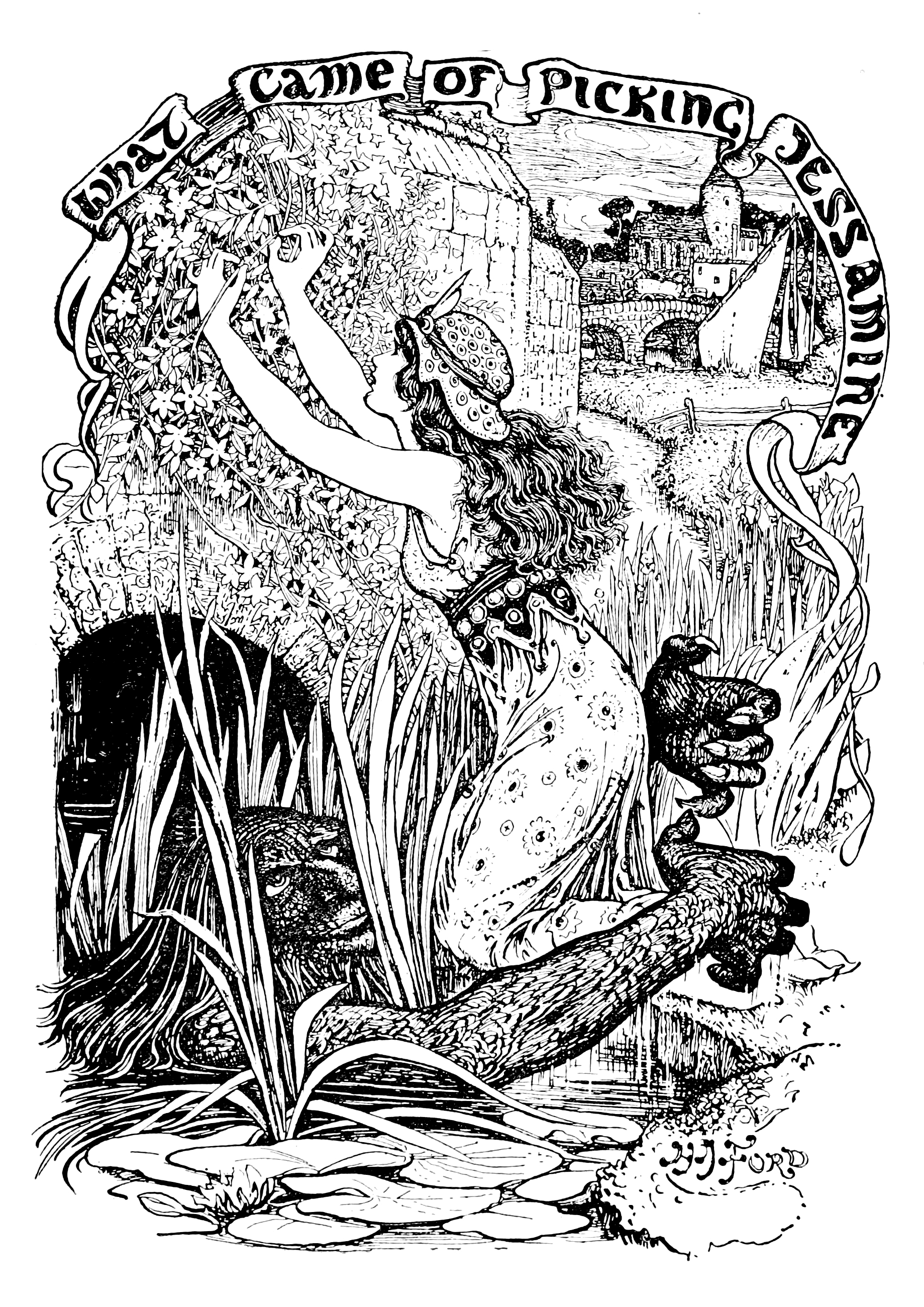
What Came of Picking Jessamine. The Grey Fairy Book. (1900)

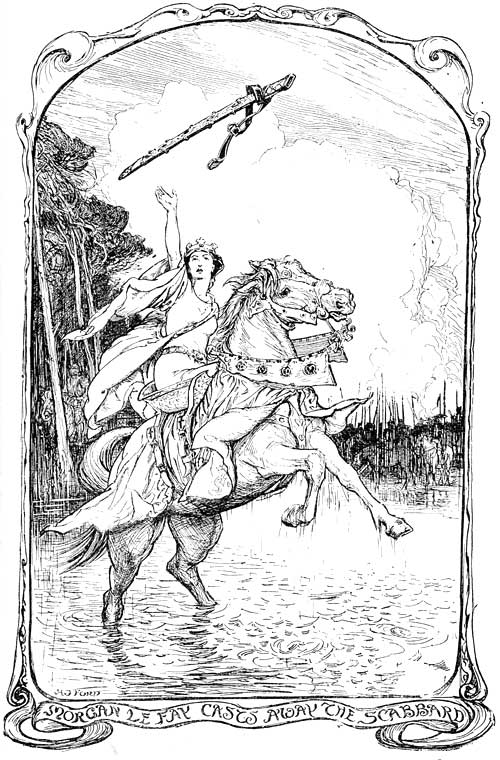
Morgan Casts Away Excalibur's Scabbard. King Arthur: The Tales of the Round Table. (1902)

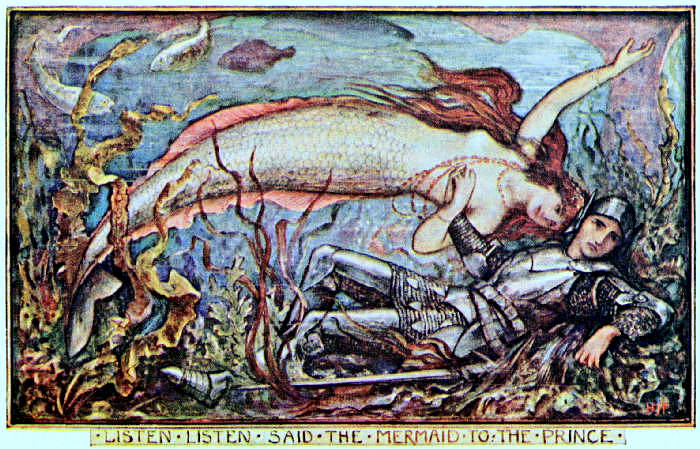
Listen listen, said the Mermaid to the Prince. The Brown Fairy Book. (1904)

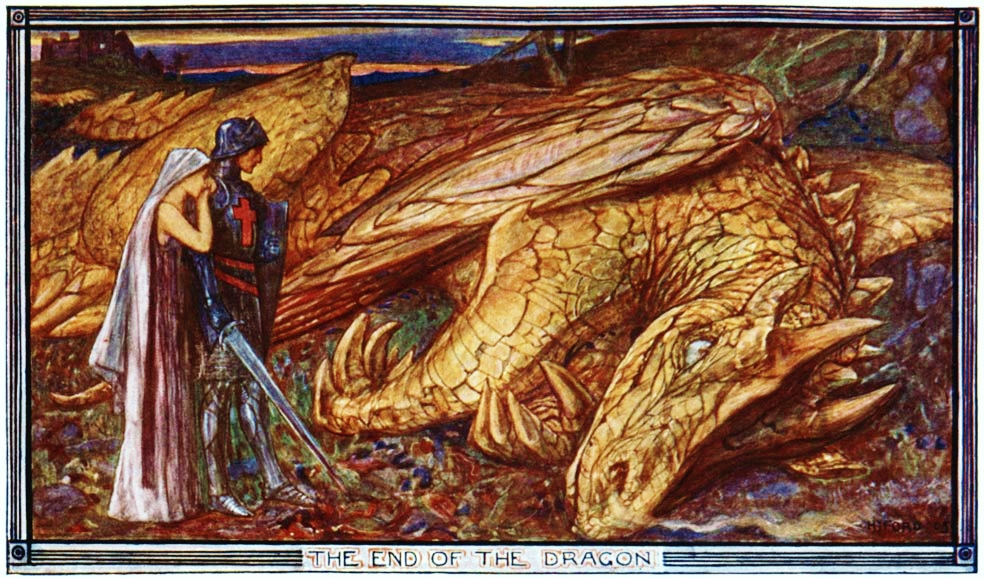
The End of the Dragon. The Red Romance Book. (1905)

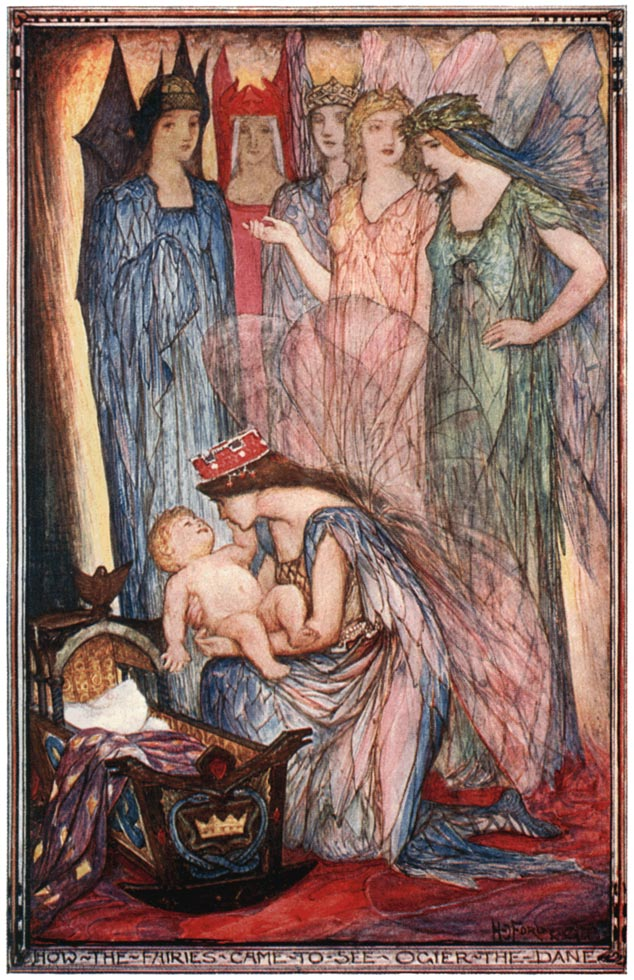
How the Fairies came to see Ogier the Dane. The Red Romance Book. (1905)

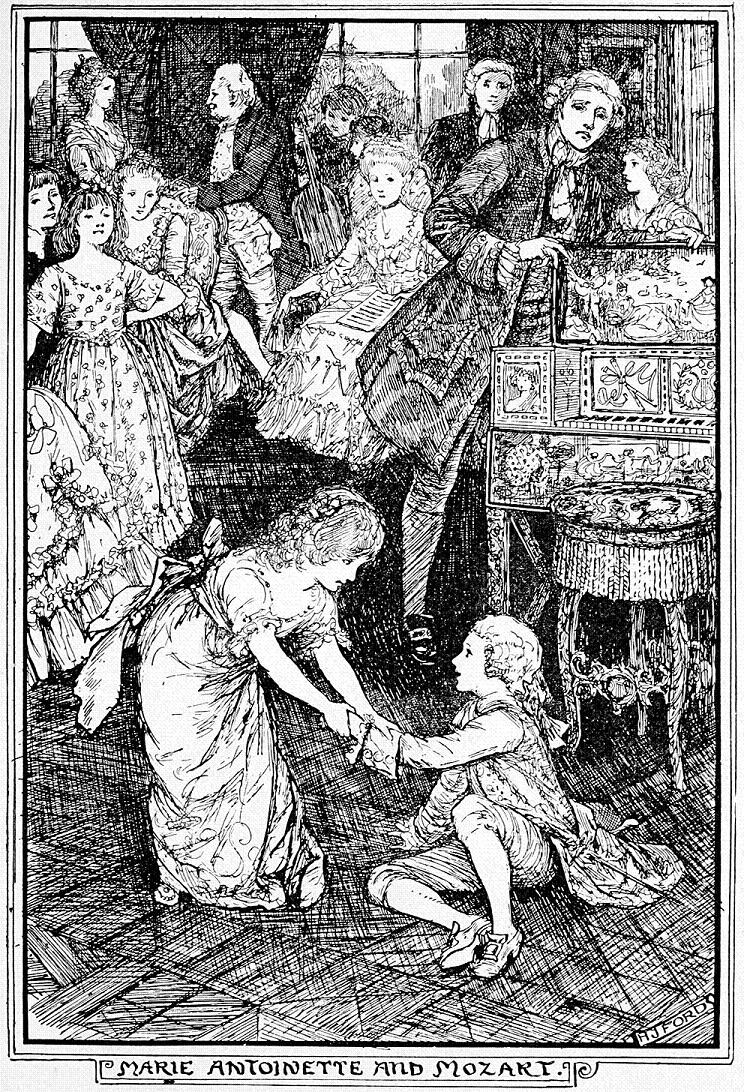
Marie Antoinette and Mozart. The Book of Princes and Princesses. (1908)

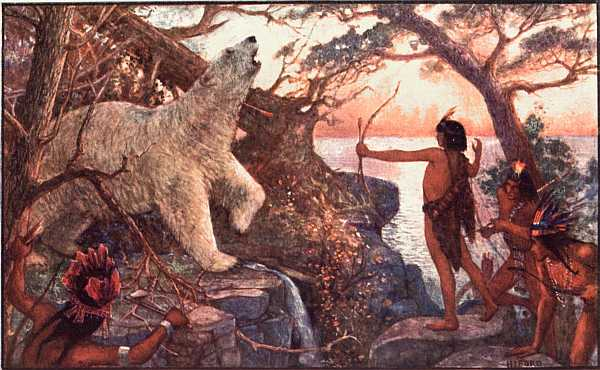
Indians. The Strange Story Book. (1913)

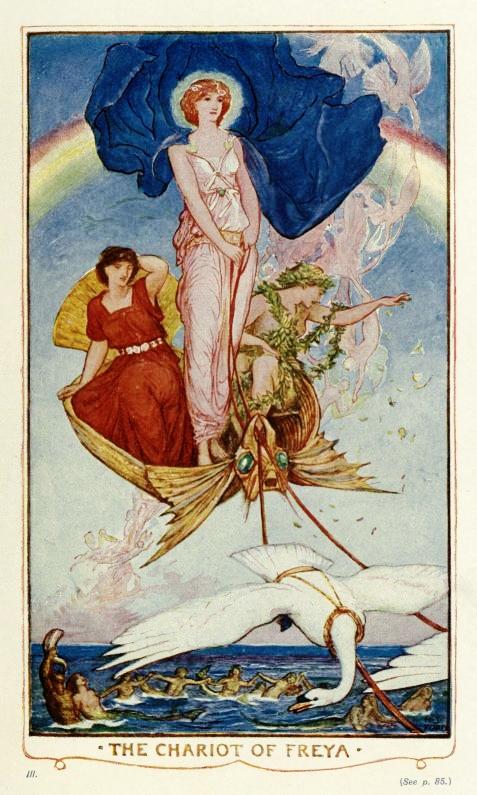
The Chariot of Freya. Tales of Romance. (1919)

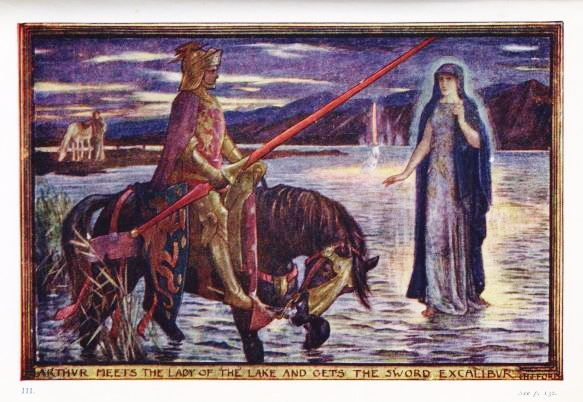
Arthur meets the Lady of the Lake and gets the Sword Excalibur. Tales of Romance. (1919)
