= Edmund Diggle =

The Venerable Edmund Diggle, D.D. (b Sutterton 26 October 1627 - d York 1 August 1688) was a priest in England during the 17th century.

Diggle was educated at Magdalen College, Oxford. He became Treasurer of Lichfield Cathedral in 1660; Canon and Archdeacon of York in 1663; Rector of Slimbridge in 1667; and Canon of Ripon in 1667.
