= Nettleton, Lincolnshire =

Village and civil parish in the West Lindsey district of Lincolnshire, England

Coordinates: 53.486115°N 0.330182°W

Nettleton
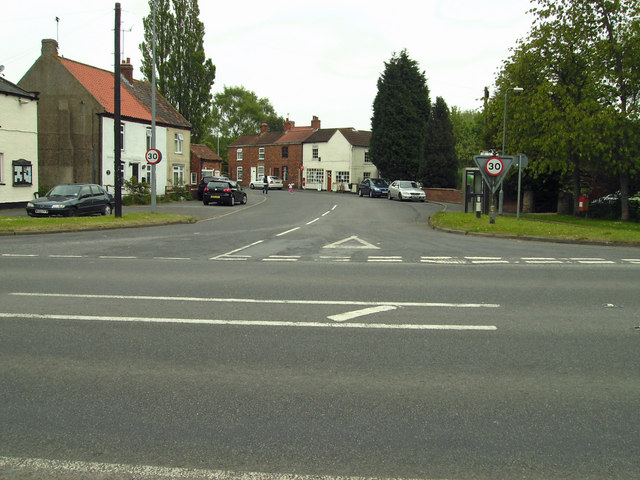
- Nettleton village

- Location within Lincolnshire
- Population: 579 (2001)
- OS grid reference: TA108001
  - London: 140 mi (230 km) S
- Civil parish: Nettleton
- District: West Lindsey
- Shire county: Lincolnshire
- Region: East Midlands
- Country: England
- Sovereign state: United Kingdom
- Post town: Market Rasen
- Postcode district: LN7
- Police: Lincolnshire
- Fire: Lincolnshire
- Ambulance: East Midlands
- UK Parliament: Gainsborough

Nettleton is a village and civil parish in the West Lindsey district of Lincolnshire, England. It is situated less than 1 mile (1.6 km) south-west from the town of Caistor. At the 2001 census, the village had a population of 579.

== Geography ==
Nettleton contains a village shop, a primary school, and a Methodist Church. The village public house is the Salutation Inn. Nearby is the Woodland Trust's Nettleton Wood, and a caravan park.

== History ==
On Boxing Day, shoemakers would traditionally 'beat the lapstone' at the house of any 'water drinker' (teetotaller), as a mocking act and practical joke. The tradition derives from an 18th-century story in which a Nettleton resident, Thomas Stickler, who had declined alcohol for twenty years, became inebriated after drinking half a pint of ale at his shoemaker on Christmas Day. When questioned by his wife, he replied that he was not drunk but had simply fallen "over the lapstone".

== Notable former residents ==
- Henry Hooke was Rector from 1597 to 1634 although from 1615 he was mainly in York where he was city preacher and was Archdeacon from 1617 to 1624. During his time at Nettleton, he sheltered Francis Cartwright who had killed the vicar of Market Rasen, Francis Storre.
- The parents and grandparents of Guy Martin
- Runner Jane Colebrook
