= Thomas Chippenham (priest) =

Thomas Chippenham was Archdeacon of York from 1470 until 1478 when he became Archdeacon of Totnes.
