= Walter Hook =

English cleric (1798–1875)

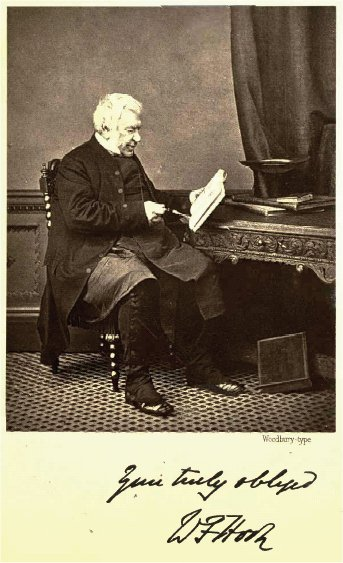
Signed photo of Walter Farquhar Hook

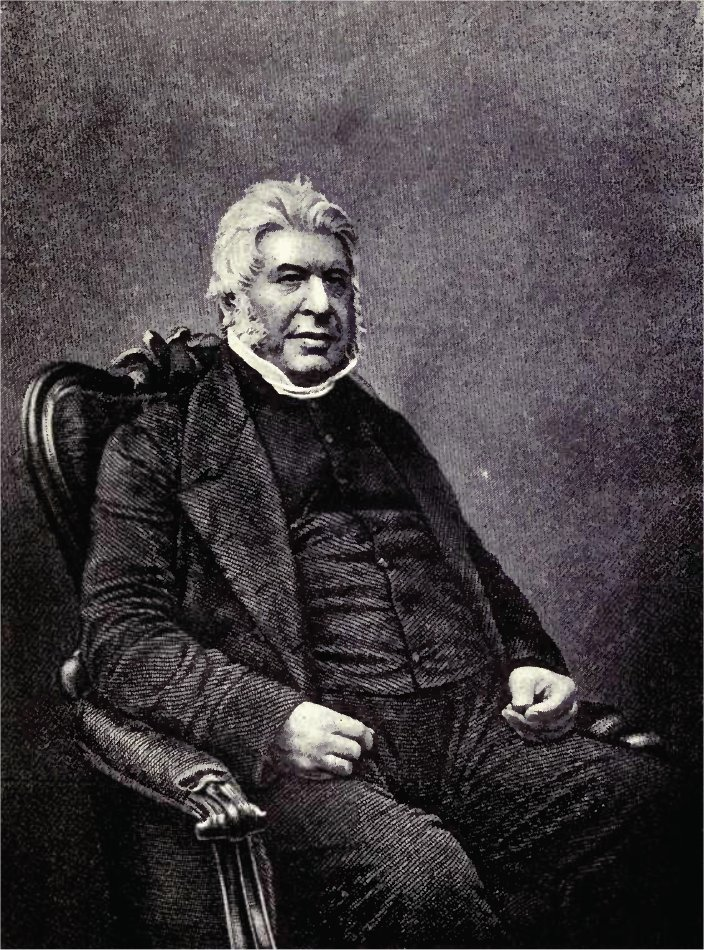
Walter Farquhar Hook

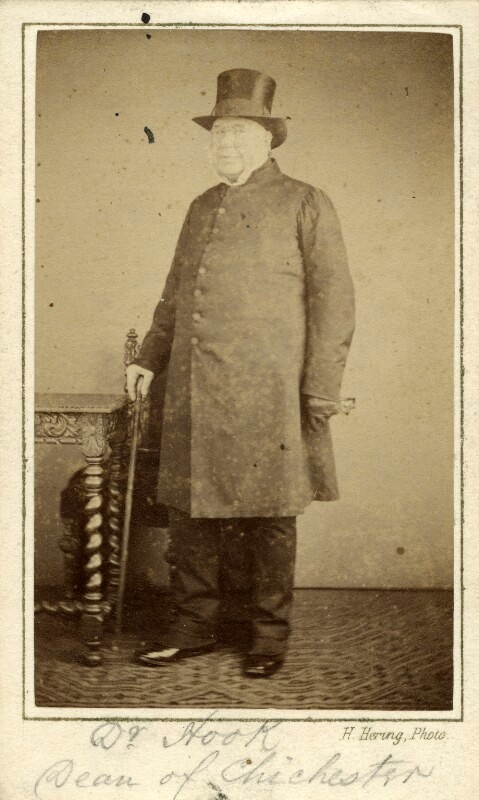
Walter Hook circa 1860

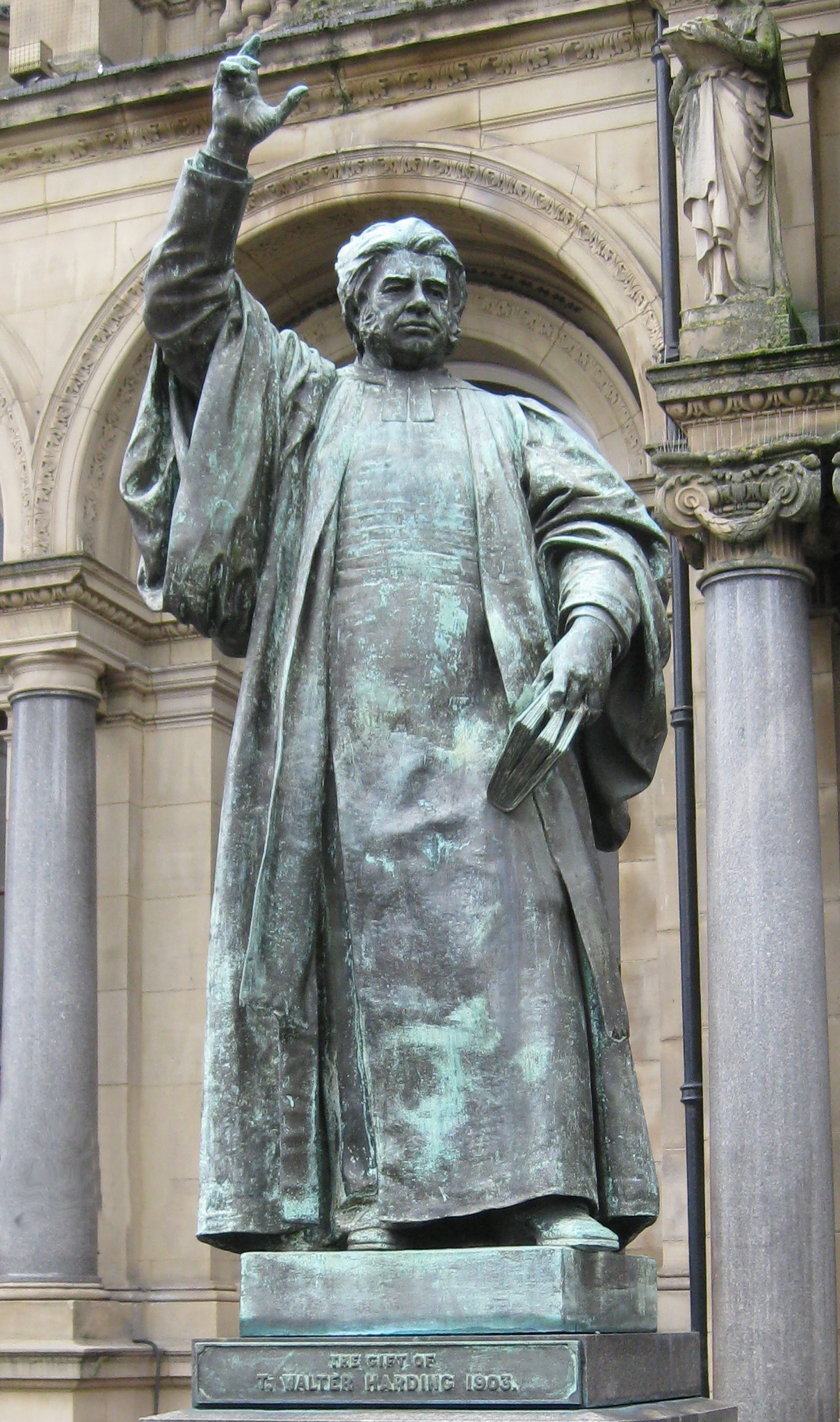
Statue in Leeds City Square

Walter Farquhar Hook (13 March 1798 – 20 October 1875), known to his contemporaries as Dr Hook, was an eminent Victorian churchman.

He was the Vicar of Leeds responsible for the construction of the current Leeds Minster and for many ecclesiastical and social improvements to the city in the mid-nineteenth century. His achievements, as a High Churchman and Tractarian in a non-conformist city are remarkable. Later in life, he became Dean of Chichester.

== Biography ==
=== Early life ===
Hook was born the son of James Hook, FRS and his wife Anne Farquhar, daughter of Sir Walter Farquhar MD, in London on 13 March 1798, and educated first at Blundell's School in Tiverton, Devon, then Winchester College, and Christ Church, Oxford, where he graduated in 1821. He obtained his MA in 1824, and his BD and DD in 1837. On taking Holy Orders in 1822, he served first as a curate at his father's church, St Mildred's Church, Whippingham on the Isle of Wight, later as vicar at St Mary's Church, Moseley, Birmingham, and, in 1828, vicar of the Holy Trinity Church, Coventry. He married Anna Delicia, (1811 – 5 April 1871) daughter of Dr John Johnstone of Birmingham on 4 June 1829 and they had several children. One daughter, Charlotte Jane Hook, married William Stephens, who went on to be Dean on Winchester from 1895 to 1902.

=== Leeds ===
His support for the ideals of the Tractarians exposed him to considerable criticism, but his "simple manly character and zealous devotion to parochial work gained him the support of widely divergent classes", according to the 1911 Encyclopædia Britannica.

Leeds invited him to be its Vicar in 1837. The city was expanding as one of the seats of the early Industrial Revolution, in which non-conformists played a large part. The established church in the city was a minority denomination and dissenters were even elected as churchwardens. In 1842 the elections produced a slate of Chartist churchwardens.

Hook rebuilt his church, using the church rate levied by the city authorities; this was in the face of objections from non-conformists. He went on to drive through the division of Leeds into 21 parishes, each with its own church. He accepted a reduction in his income and moved to a smaller parsonage, under a deal meaning that ground-floor seats of parish churches in Leeds were bought by the Ecclesiastical Commissioners, rather than allowing pew rentals

Hook fostered the building and support of some 30 schools. His interest in the education of children was contentious at the time, before the Education Acts of the late nineteenth century. His insistence on the necessity of education, and the duty of society to provide it, to some extent, was not what some of his richest parishioners believed.

The minster remains as a physical legacy of Hook's work, being a significant early High Church Gothic revival design.

=== Chichester ===
Hook left Leeds to take up the Deanery of Chichester in 1859. He was appointed honorary chaplain of the Chichester-based 1st Administrative Battalion, Sussex Rifle Volunteer Corps, on 13 August 1864. He died 20 October 1875 and was buried in Mid Lavant, a small village near Chichester.

== Honours ==
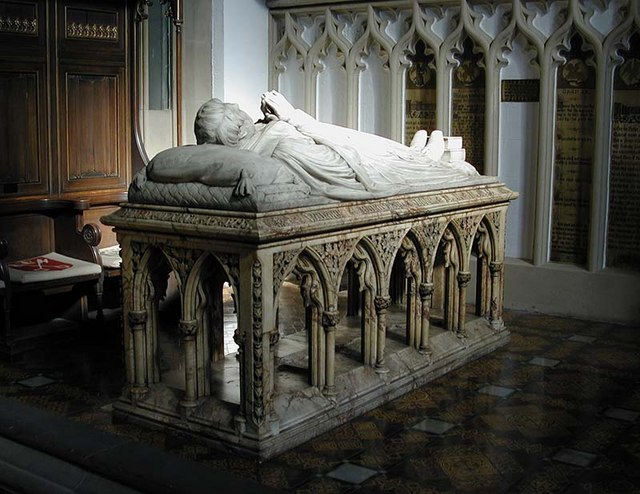
Memorial in Leeds Minster

He was elected a Fellow of the Royal Society in 1862 as someone "Eminent as a Divine. Author of the Lives of the Archbishops of Canterbury, of The Ecclesiastical Biography, Church Dictionary & several other works."

A memorial to Hook was built in the Leeds Parish Church, and in 1903 a statue was erected to him in City Square, in the company of a select few other leading fathers of the city. What is now All Souls' Church, Blackman Lane in Leeds was built by public subscription as the Hook Memorial.

His son in law William Stephens dedicated his 1896 book Memorials of the South Saxon See and Cathedral Church of Winchester to his memory.

== Writings ==
- 1842: Church Dictionary (often reprinted)
- 1845: Dictionary of Ecclesiastical Biography. 8 vols. 1845–1852
- 1860: Lives of the Archbishops of Canterbury. 12 vols. 1860–1876

== Sources ==
- Leodis: Leeds
- Stephens, W. R. W. (1878) The Life and Letters of Walter Farquhar Hook. 2 vols. London: Richard Bentley & Son
- Obituary of Dean Hook, The Times, Thursday, 21 October 1875; p. 8; Issue 28452; col F

Church of England titles
Preceded by George Chandler	Dean of Chichester; 1859–1875	Succeeded by John William Burgon
