= John Wood (civil servant, born 1870) =

English cricketer (1870–1933)

Personal information
- Full name: John Barry Wood
- Born: 27 April 1870; Cheltenham, Gloucestershire, England
- Died: 10 February 1933 (aged 62); Virginia Water, Surrey, England
- Batting: Right-handed
- Bowling: Right-arm underarm slow

Domestic team information
- Years: Team
- 1891–1893: Oxford University

Career statistics
Competition	First-class
Matches	16
Runs scored	384
Batting average	14.22
100s/50s	–/1
Top score	50
Balls bowled	2,052
Wickets	53
Bowling average	26.39
5 wickets in innings	3
10 wickets in match	–
Best bowling	6/68
Catches/stumpings	10/–
- Source: Cricinfo, 23 April 2020

Sir John Barry Wood KCIE KCVO CSI (27 April 1870 – 10 February 1933) was an English first-class cricketer and a civil servant in the Indian Civil Service.

The son of The Reverend Joseph Wood, he was born at Cheltenham in September 1866. He was educated at Marlborough College, before going up to Balliol College, Oxford. While studying at Oxford, he played first-class cricket for Oxford University, making his debut in a trial match against H. Philipson's XI at Oxford in 1891. Securing his place in the Oxford side for 1892 and 1893, he made a further fifteen appearances, gaining a blue in 1892. As a right-handed batsman, he scored 384 runs at an average of 14.22 and a high score of 55. With his underarm bowling, he took 53 wickets at a bowling average of 26.39. He took a five wicket haul on three occasions and recorded best innings bowling figures of 6 for 68. His best season was in 1892, with his bowling average becoming more expensive in 1893. During his studies he also played minor cricket for Warwickshire, then considered a second-class county.

After graduating from Oxford, Wood joined the Indian Civil Service in as an assistant collector in Bengal in 1893 and by 1899 he was an under-secretary to the Indian Government. He was an administrator to the Baluchistan Agency in 1903, before becoming deputy-secretary to the Government of India in the Foreign Department in 1908. He was appointed a Companion to the Order of the Indian Empire in the 1911 New Year Honours. Wood was residing in Lahore in 1913, and by 1916 he was a member of the Council of the Governor-General, assigned to create new laws and regulations. In the 1916 Birthday Honours, he was appointed a companion of the Order of the Star of India. In the 1918 New Year Honours, he was appointed a Knight Commander of the Order of the Indian Empire. Just over five years later in June 1922, he was appointed a Knight Commander of the Royal Victorian Order. Later returning to England, he died in February 1933 at Virginia Water, Surrey.
