= Richard Seed (priest) =

Richard Murray Crosland Seed (born 9 May 1949) was Archdeacon of York in the Diocese of York from 1999 to 2011.

Seed was educated at St Philip's School, Burley-in-Wharfedale; Edinburgh Theological College; and Leeds University. He was ordained Deacon in 1972, and priest in 1973. After curacies in Skipton and Baildonhe was Team Vicar of Kidlington from 1977 to 1980; and then of Boston Spa from 1980 until his appointment as Archdeacon. During this time he was also Rector of Micklegate. In 2011 he became a Residentiary Canon and Prebendary of York Minster. He retired in 2015.
