= Thomas Layng =

Thomas Malcolm Layng
- Born: 23 April 1892
- Died: 21 April 1958 (aged 65); Cheltenham

Thomas Malcolm Layng, CBE, MC & Bar (23 April 1892 – 21 April 1958) was an Anglican soldier and clergyman who served as Deputy Chaplain-General to the Forces, Archdeacon of York and chaplain to King George VI and Queen Elizabeth II.

== Early life and education ==
Layng was the son of Dr Henry Layng of Swatow, China, and nephew of Thomas Layng, headmaster of Abingdon School. He was educated first at Abingdon School (1900–06) and then at Clifton College (1906–11) before entering Balliol College, Oxford.

== Career ==
Layng joined the Indian Army, and was awarded a Military Cross in the First World War. His brother George Reginald Stuart Layng was killed during the war in 1916. Thomas was Brigade Major on the Afghan frontier (1919) and then involved in the campaign against the Waziris (1920 and 1923). Abandoning his military career he was ordained (1932) and became curate of Berkeley and dock chaplain at Sharpness (1933), rector of Duloe, Cornwall (1934–38) and chaplain and fellow of his old Oxford College (1938).

He served in the Second World War in the Royal Army Chaplains' Department and was awarded a bar to his Military Cross at Dunkirk (1940). He was deputy Chaplain-General to the Mediterranean forces (1945) and rector of Burnaby and Nunburnholme (1946–48) and Archdeacon of York (1946–47).

Layng was chaplain to King George VI and Queen Elizabeth II (1940–51) and awarded an MBE (1924) and CBE (1945). Latterly he served as vicar of Kemble and Poole Keynes (1950–55). He dedicated the Second World War memorial at Abingdon School chapel (1949).

His funeral was held at St Mark Cheltenham on Friday 25 April 1958.

Church of England titles
Preceded by Arthur Creyke England	Archdeacon of York; 1946 – 1947	Succeeded by George Frederick Townley

== See also ==
- List of Old Abingdonians
