= Stuart Corbett =

Archdeacon of York

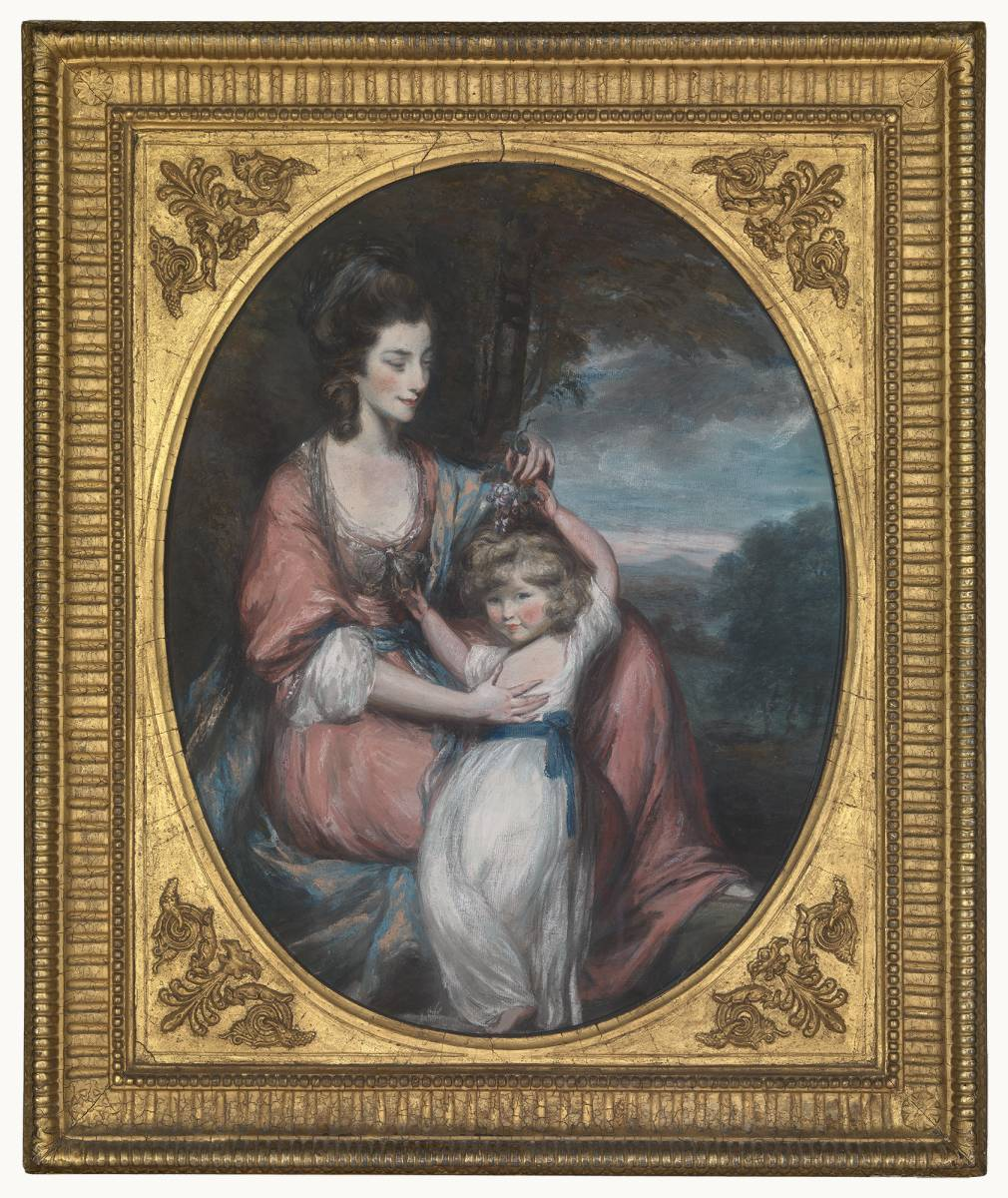
- Corbett as a child with his mother, Lady Augusta Corbett. Portrait by Daniel Gardner.
- Died: 25 August 1845
- Education: Merton College
- Mother: Lady Augusta Corbett

Stuart Corbett, D.D. (24 May 1774- 25 August 1845) was Archdeacon of York from 27 September 1837 until his death.

A nephew of John Stuart, 1st Marquess of Bute Corbett was educated at Merton College, Oxford. After a curacy at Wortley he held incumbencies at Kirk Bramwith and Scrayingham.
