= Hugh (Dean of York) =

Hugh, first dean of York, was appointed by archbishop Thomas I before December 1093. He was present at a royal council at Gloucester on 25 December 1093 and visited Fountains Abbey with archbishop Thurstan on 9 October 1132. It was this abbey to which he retired as old and infirm, to become a Cistercian monk, in 1135 – he was also a benefactor to it and founded its library.

== Sources ==
- http://www.british-history.ac.uk/report.asp?compid=10458#s4 'List 2: Deans', Fasti Ecclesiae Anglicanae 1066-1300: Volume 6: York (1999), pp. 7–13.
