= George Ford (ice hockey) =

Canadian ice hockey player (born 1930)

- Born: June 8, 1930 (age 94); Toronto, Ontario, Canada
- Height: 5 ft 8 in (173 cm)
- Weight: 163 lb (74 kg; 11 st 9 lb)
- Position: Right wing
- Shot: Right
- Played for: Syracuse Warriors; Baltimore Clippers; Springfield Indians; Ottawa Senators; Vancouver Canucks; Los Angeles Blades; Victoria Cougars; Winnipeg Warriors
- Playing career: 1950–1964

George Allen Ford (born June 8, 1930) is a Canadian former professional ice hockey player who played for the Syracuse Warriors, Baltimore Clippers and Springfield Indians in the American Hockey League.

== Early life ==
Born in Toronto, Ford played junior hockey for the Barrie Flyers in the 1947–48 season.

== Career ==
Ford had a three-game tryout with the Windsor Hettche Spitfires of the International League. He tried out again the following season for the team, now named the Detroit Hettche, but instead joined the Galt Black Hawks.

Ford made the professional ranks full-time with the Springfield Indians. He later played in Ottawa, Vancouver, Syracuse, Pittsburgh, Winnipeg, Victoria, Los Angeles and Baltimore, finishing his professional career in 1964. He returned to hockey in 1967 to play three more seasons with Barrie and Orillia senior hockey teams.
