= Lionel Ford =

Anglican priest and Dean of York (1865–1932)

Very Rev Lionel Ford
- Dean of York
- Portrait by Walter Stoneman, 1924
- Church: Church of England
- In office: 1925-1932
- Predecessor: William Foxley Norris
- Successor: Herbert Bate

Orders
- Ordination: 1893 (deacon); 1895 (priest)

Personal details
- Born: Lionel George Bridges Justice Ford; 3 September 1865 Paddington, London
- Died: 27 March 1932 (aged 66) York, England
- Denomination: Anglicanism
- Parents: William Augustus Ford (father)
- Spouse: Mary Catherine Talbot (m. 1904)
- Children: 2 daughters and 5 sons, including Neville Ford and Edward Ford
- Education: Repton School; King's College, Cambridge

Lionel George Bridges Justice Ford (3 September 1865 – 27 March 1932) was an Anglican priest who served as Dean of York after two headmasterships at notable English independent schools Repton and Harrow, having also worked at Eton College. In his youth, he also played cricket for Buckinghamshire in the Minor Counties Championship.

== Early life and education ==
Ford was born in Paddington, London, the son of William Augustus Ford and Katherine Mary Justice. His father had played cricket for the Marylebone Cricket Club ("MCC") and his brother Francis Ford played cricket for England. Ford's grandfather was George Samuel Ford, a well known bill discounter.

Ford was educated at Repton School and King's College, Cambridge, where he won the Chancellor's Classical Medal and was a member of the Pitt Club. He was also President of the Cambridge Union Society in his final year of studies.

== Career ==
=== Schoolmaster ===
Ford became an assistant master at Eton in 1888 and worked there until 1901. He was remembered for his influence on the game of Eton fives, which he excelled at.

He became headmaster of Repton School in 1901 and in 1910 moved to Harrow, where he was headmaster until 1925.

=== Cricket ===
In 1898 and 1899 he played cricket for minor county Buckinghamshire.

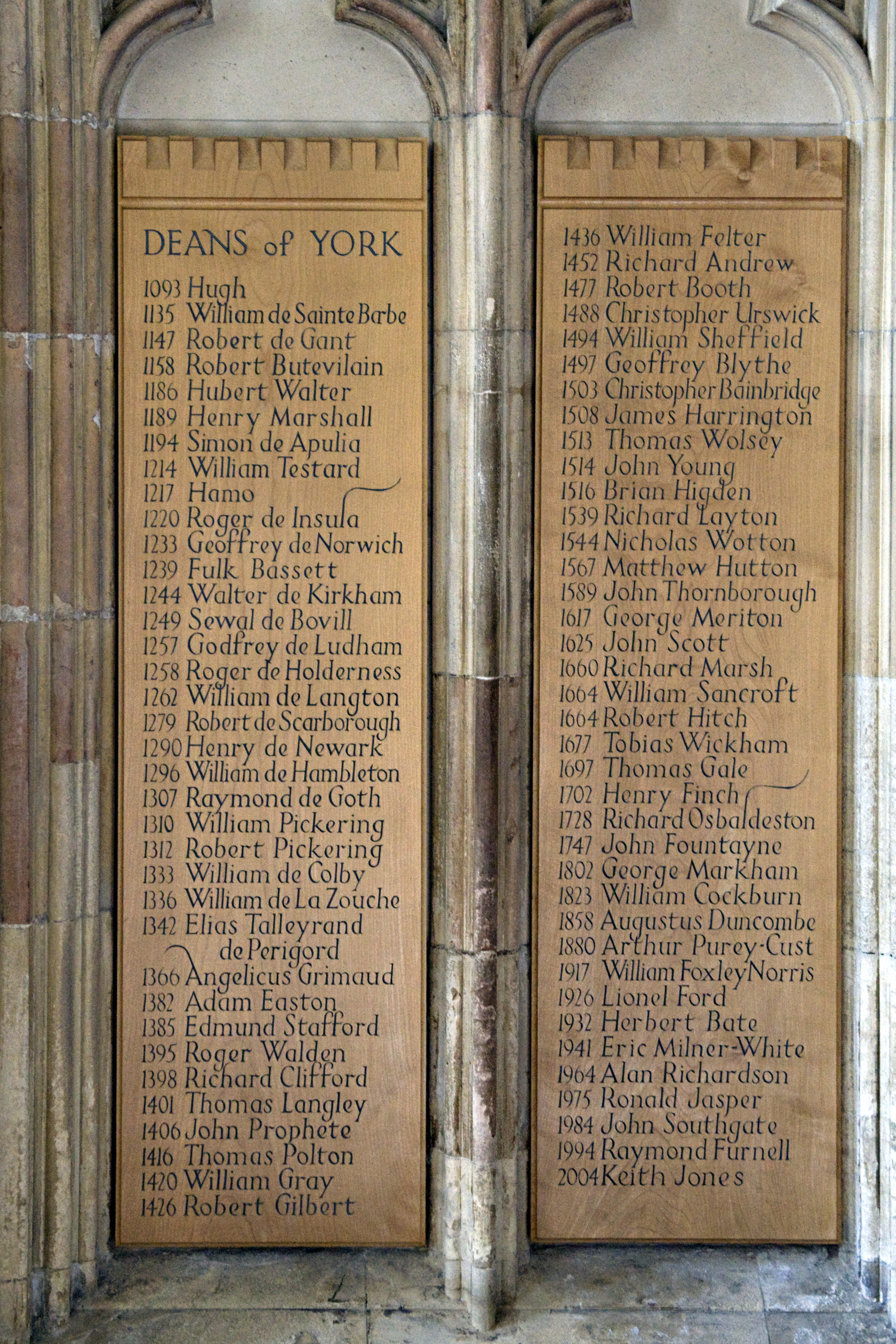
Lionel Ford is listed in a plaque in York Minster, alongside the names of other Deans of York.

=== Clergyman ===
Ford and was ordained as a deacon in the Anglican church in Oxford in 1893. In 1925 he became the dean at York, a post he was to hold until his death on Easter Sunday seven years later. During his tenure, he founded the Friends of York Minster, which celebrated its 90th anniversary in 2018.

== Personal life and death ==
Ford married in 1904 Mary Catherine Talbot, daughter of the education campaigner Lavinia Talbot and Edward Stuart Talbot, who was successively Bishop of Rochester, Southwark and Winchester. They had two daughters and five sons, including:

- Neville Ford (1906–2000), a notable cricketer for Derbyshire, who married Patricia Smiles, daughter of Ulster Unionist MP W. D. Smiles and Margaret Heighway, and great-niece of Mrs Beeton, in 1941.
- Edward Ford (1910–2006), a courtier in the Royal Household of King George VI and Queen Elizabeth II; he married the widow Virginia Brand Polk, daughter of Robert Brand, 1st Baron Brand, in 1949.

Their third son Richard Lionel Ford died in 1924, the day before his sixteenth birthday.

Lionel Ford is the great-grandfather of TV personality and chief Scout Bear Grylls.

Ford died on 27 March 1932, during his tenure as the Dean of York. His memorial is in the restored Zouche Chapel in York Minster.

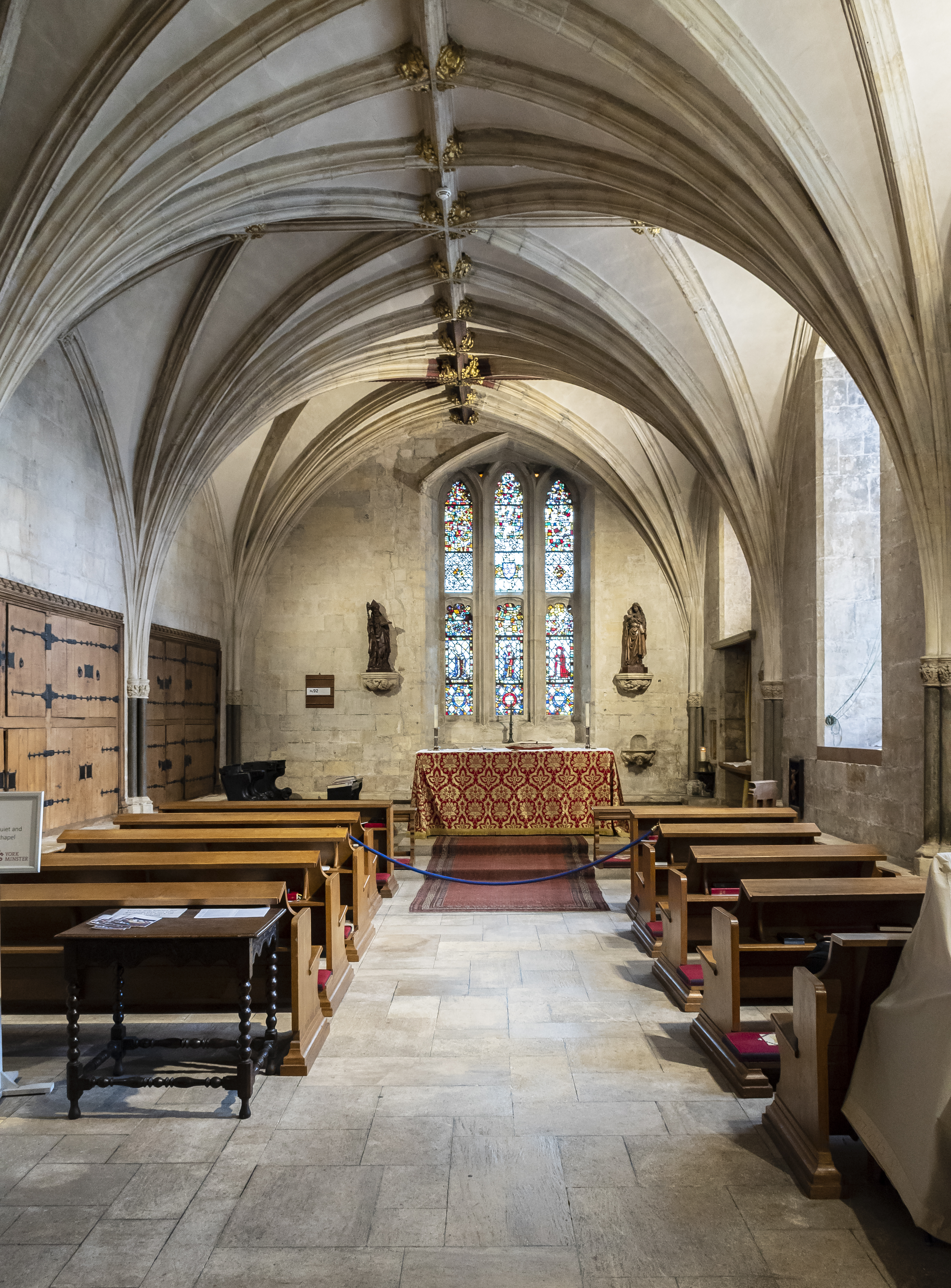
Zouche chapel, York Minster, where a memorial to Lionel Ford is located.

Academic offices
Preceded by Joseph Wood	Head Master of Harrow School; 1910–1925	Succeeded by Cyril Norwood
Preceded by Hubert Burge	Headmaster of Repton School; 1901–1910	Succeeded by William Temple
Religious titles
Preceded by William Foxley Norris	Dean of York; 1925-1932	Succeeded by Herbert Bate
