= Neville Ford =

English cricketer (1906–2000)

Personal information
- Full name: Neville Montague Ford
- Born: 18 November 1906; Repton Derbyshire, England
- Died: 15 June 2000 (aged 93); Bembridge, Isle of Wight, England
- Batting: Right-handed

Domestic team information
- Years: Team
- 1926–1934: Derbyshire
- 1928–1930: Oxford University
- 1932: Middlesex
- 1932: MCC
- FC debut: 18 August 1926 Derbyshire v Northamptonshire
- Last FC: 8 June 1935 Free Foresters v Cambridge University

Career statistics
Competition	First-class
Matches	75
Runs scored	2,925
Batting average	26.11
100s/50s	5/13
Top score	183
Balls bowled	135
Wickets	1
Bowling average	117.00
5 wickets in innings	0
10 wickets in match	0
Best bowling	1/19
Catches/stumpings	15/–
- Source: CricketArchive, November 2011

Neville Montague Ford (18 November 1906 – 15 June 2000) was an English cricketer who played for Derbyshire, Oxford University, Middlesex and Marylebone Cricket Club (MCC) between 1926 and 1934.

== Early life ==
Ford was born at Repton, the son of the Rev Lionel Ford and his wife Mary Talbot. His father was then headmaster of Repton School and in 1910 became headmaster of Harrow School. His mother was the daughter of education campaigner Lavinia Talbot and Edward Stuart Talbot, who was Bishop of Rochester, Southwark and Winchester. Ford's brother Sir Edward Ford became assistant private secretary first to King George VI and then to Queen Elizabeth II.

Ford belonged to a large family of cricketers. His grandfather William Augustus Ford played for Marylebone Cricket Club (MCC) from 1839 to 1849. His father and brother Clifford also played for minor counties. Of his uncles Francis Ford played for England, Middlesex and Marylebone Cricket Club (MCC), William Justice Ford played for Cambridge University, Middlesex and MCC, Augustus Ford played for Cambridge University, Middlesex and MCC. His uncle Neville Talbot played for Oxford University and his grandmother, the daughter of the 4th Lord Lyttelton, belonged to another family of cricketers.

Ford was educated at Summer Fields School and Harrow where he became head of the school and captain of cricket. While still at school he began playing for Derbyshire. He made his debut in August 1926 in a victory against Northamptonshire and followed it up with a draw against Kent. He played two games for Derbyshire in 1927.

=== Cricket ===
Ford then went to Oriel College, Oxford having been awarded the Evelyn de Rothschild scholarship. He played cricket for Oxford University in three successive years from 1928 to 1930. His centuries all came for Oxford and were 151 against Nottinghamshire and 118 against Free Foresters in 1929 and 155 against Kent, 183 against the Free Foresters and 180 against Surrey in 1930. Against Surrey he added 276 for the fourth wicket with Patrick Kingsley in under three hours. Ford also won half Blues for rackets and fives at Oxford. Meanwhile, he continued playing for Derbyshire at the end of season and also put in a game for minor county Devon in 1929.

== Career ==
After Oxford, Ford joined the British Metal Corporation, and played for a variety of sides including the MCC and Free Foresters and made an appearance for Middlesex in 1932. He was back with Derbyshire in 1934 and played 6 matches that year. In 1937 he toured Canada with MCC. Ford was a right-hand batsman and played 121 innings in 75 first-class matches. He made 2,925 runs at an average of 26.11, with five centuries and a top score of 183. As a bowler he took one wicket and his average was 117.

Ford had moved to work for the paper manufacturers Wiggins Teape and joined up in the Second World War. He served in the Berkshire Yeomanry and then the Household Cavalry. In 1940 he was ADC to Major-General Adrian Carton de Wiart during the Norway campaign. When he took part in Operation Overlord, Ford acquired the nickname "Foghorn". A captured German officer, having heard him on the radio leading armoured cars advancing into Belgium, inquired after him: "Excuse me, we have grown very fond of the British officer with the foghorn voice. We haven't heard him lately. Is he still alive?"

After the war, Ford rejoined Wiggins Teape, and became a director. For many years he was on the board of directors of the Theatre Royal, Windsor and supported the Royal Ballet's School of dancing. He was still playing cricket for the Household Division in his sixties. When his grandson Edward "Bear" Grylls neared the summit as the youngest Briton to climb Mount Everest, Ford gave him encouragement over the satellite telephone.

== Personal life ==
Ford married in 1941 Patricia Smiles, the daughter of Ulster Unionist MP W. D. Smiles and Margaret Heighway, and great-niece of Mrs Beeton. When her father died in the MV Princess Victoria disaster in January 1953, she stood for the by-election and won, becoming MP for North Down until the 1955 general election, when she stood down. The couple had two daughters – Sally, who married Sir Michael Grylls and whose son is explorer Bear Grylls, and Mary Rose, who is married and has two daughters. The marriage was dissolved in 1956 and his ex-wife then married Sir Nigel Fisher MP in 1956. In 1975, Ford married Beatrice Hudson, who predeceased him.

Ford died at Bembridge, Isle of Wight at the age of 93. At the time of his death he was the longest surviving member of both MCC and the Free Foresters.
