= Cecil Cooper (priest) =

Cecil Henry Hamilton Cooper (25 October 1871 – 6 January 1942) was Dean of Carlisle from 1933 to 1938.

Born into an ecclesiastical family in Beyton, Suffolk, Cooper was the son of Henry William Cooper, sometime Vicar of West Norwood. he was educated at Pocklington School and Keble College, Oxford and ordained in 1895. After curacies at St Mary's Alverstoke and St Faith with St Cross Hospital, Winchester he held incumbencies in Winchester and Scarborough before being appointed Archdeacon of York in 1923. A decade later he was elevated to the Deanery, retiring in 1938. He died on 6 January 1942.

Cooper married in Winchester Cathedral on 27 January 1903 to Cecil Hatherly Stephens, daughter of William Stephens, a previous Dean of Winchester.

Church of England titles
Preceded by Henry Venn Stuart	Dean of Carlisle; 1933 – 1938	Succeeded by Frederick William Matheson
