= Henry Hooke =

- Born: Henry Hooke
- Occupations: Clergy, Church of England
- Known for: Archdeacon of York
- Notable work: provided shelter and guidance to Francis Cartwright

Henry Hooke (fl. 1600s) was Archdeacon of York.

Henry Hooke was appointed city preacher in York in 1615 due to the influence of Lord Sheffield. He was appointed Archdeacon in 1617. He left this post in 1624 and became a Prebendary of the Minster and later vicar of Caistor in Lincolnshire.

Whilst at Nettleton, he provided shelter and guidance to Francis Cartwright, who in 1602 had killed the vicar of nearby Market Rasen. Their relationship is detailed in Cartwright's autobiography.
