= Charles Forder =

Archdeacon of York

Charles Robert Forder (6 January 1907 – 10 October 2008) was Archdeacon of York from 1957 to 1972.

Forder was educated at Paston Grammar School, Christ's College, Cambridge and Ridley Hall, Cambridge and ordained in 1930. After curacies in Hunslet and Burley he held Incumbencies in Wibsey, Bradford, Drypool, Routh, Wawne and Micklegate.

Church of England titles
Preceded by George Frederick Townley	Archdeacon of York; 1957 – 1972	Succeeded by Leslie Cyril Stanbridge
