= George Samuel Ford =

English money lender and solicitor (1790–1868)

- Born: 1790
- Died: 1868 (aged 77–78)
- Occupation: Money lender

George Samuel Ford (1790–1868) was a bill discounter (money lender) and solicitor who took interest in the financial affairs of many gentlemen of the period including the Lords Lichfield, Chesterfield, Suffield and the Count d'Orsay. A passionate follower of the turf, he was known in horseracing circles as "Lawyer Ford".

== Background information ==
Ford's offices were at 8 Henrietta Street, Covent Garden, London; his residential properties were in Stratton Street, London and Brunswick Square, Brighton. He was born in St Clement Danes, London, and in 1816 married Hanna Bramah (1795–1862) at St George's, Hanover Square, daughter of civil engineer Joseph Bramah. Their children included Sir Theodore Thomas Ford, who became Chief Justice for the Straits Settlements, Horace Alfred Ford, one of the greatest target archers of all time, William Augustus Ford, who followed Ford into the business and was a cricketer who played for the MCC, and George Ford who was also a cricketer and became a clergyman. Ford's grandchildren included Francis Ford, a good cricketer who played for his country, Lionel Ford who became headmaster of Harrow and the painter Henry Justice Ford.

Ford kept horseracing stables and a stud in Newmarket and had interests in Epsom.

== Money lending and bill discounting ==
In 1844 the affairs of James Gibbs, attorney of Jermyn Street, came under public scrutiny. He had been acting as a money scrivener, investing clients' money in worthless schemes, or using the money to bolster his failing business. Over a period of 20 years he slipped deeper into debt and borrowed money at exorbitant interest rates to avoid insolvency. Gibbs was eventually forced into bankruptcy, and this resulted in public exposure of the bill discounters' activities – including those of Ford. He had been dealing with Gibbs for many years and lending at rates of 25%, although his rates were not the highest as others were charging up to 60%.

Charles Hallowell Hallowell Carew, came into contact with Ford through his association with horse racing. Ford's attendance at the track made him an easy point of contact for those who had suffered losses in the betting market. In 1851 Ford lent Carew of Beddington Park £2,000 on the security of a note and warrant of attorney. This was followed by a further £3,000 in exchange for a bill of sale for his furniture and horses. When Ford attempted to collect these assets he discovered that they had already been seized by other creditors. Court cases ensued and Carew agreed to Ford managing his financial affairs. In 1856 Carew signed away all rights to his Beddington Park properties to new owners, one of whom was Ford's son William Augustus. The property had been in the Carew family for some 500 years.

Lord Huntingtower was a "client" of Ford who faced financial difficulties. Huntingtower borrowed large sums of money during his minority and was unable to meet the repayments. At this period bankruptcy laws applied only to traders, whereas non-traders in debt were classed as insolvent, subject to imprisonment and seizure of their belongings. To avoid this happening, Lord Huntingtower claimed he was a trader. Ford, who was a creditor, disputed this and brought a case to annul the fiat, but lost this on a technicality. Huntingtower did spend a period in Debtors' prison, but admitted at a later bankruptcy hearing (9 August 1844) that if he had acted on Ford's advice earlier, he would not have been placed in such an unfortunate position.

Lord Brownlow Thomas Montagu Cecil (2nd son of the Marquis of Exeter) was another of Ford's clients to end up in jail for debt. He had applied to Ford for a loan during his minority, but Ford would not agree to this without a promissory note from his father the Marquis. However, Ford did lend a lower sum but Cecil left the country without honouring his debts. When he returned in 1854 he was arrested. Cecil applied to be discharged from custody and at the end of the hearing Ford removed his objection so that Cecil could be released. In later life Colonel Lord Brownlow Thomas Montagu Cecil was again subject of insolvency proceedings in 1894.

Sir Robert Juckes Clifton: Before he came of age in 1847, his gambling and horse racing activities placed him in debt to Ford and, like Cecil, was forced to live abroad. When he came of age he returned to England and Ford sued for his money. Clifton's father applied for an injunction against Ford but lost the case, however, the judge had little sympathy for Ford saying: "If a man would assist a boy of 19 or 20 to run extravagantly into debt, it was to be wished he would lose his money"

Sir Simeon Stuart borrowed money from Ford against his property. However, unbeknown to Ford, Sir Simeon had made a separate arrangement on this property at an earlier date. Ford went to the courts claiming he had precedence over this earlier arrangement but lost the case.

Sir Massy Stanley: On another occasion, Ford was delivering a cash loan to Sir Massy Stanley at an Ascot race meeting, when he was robbed of a reported £7000 by a pickpocket. By using underworld connections he was able to recover some of the money but had to pay a substantial "reward" to the villains.

== Accused of extorting money ==
During cross examination in the Lord Huntingtower case, Ford admitted that he had been tried and found guilty of extorting money in 1832. This referred to a case where he and the keeper of a gaming house, John Aldridge, allegedly attempted to obtain money from a person they said had forged a cheque. The case subsequently went to appeal and the ruling was overturned. Ford also admitted under oath that he had been declared bankrupt when younger, but had quickly paid off his debts.

== Bryndu Colliery ==
In 1842 Ford became the owner of Bryndu Colliery, Glamorgan, after the owner, Charles O'Neill, became bankrupt owing him £6,000. Ford set up a partnership with 2 of his sons – William Augustus Ford and Horace Alfred Ford – to run the colliery. The partnership was dissolved in July 1858 following an explosion in the pit that killed 12 miners. There had been a previous explosion in 1853 when 4 miners had been killed.

== Horse racing ==
Ford was passionately fond of horse racing and owned a stable and stud in Newmarket. In 1841 he was also the owner of a Newmarket property called Fidget Hall, a stud farm just beyond Bury Hill that was later renamed Moulton Paddocks. His big wins included the Oaks Stakes in 1843 with Poison and the Coronation Stakes with Guaracha in 1846. Some of the horses he sold on from his stable had later success including The Hermit (1851) by Bay Middleton out of Jenny Lind. Ford acquired several of Lord Chesterfield's horses in 1850, and immediately put these up for sale including Lady Evelyn by Don John, (winner of the Oaks 1849), and Mrs Taft, a future Cesarewitch Handicap winner.

== Mistaken Identity ==
Ford was similar in appearance to one of the famous politicians of the time – Sir James Graham. The similarity was such in stature, countenance, expression, and cock of the hat, that Lord Derby once said they were so alike that they "might be driven in a curricle".
