= Augustus Ford =

English cricketer (1858–1931)

Augustus Frank Justice Ford (12 September 1858 – 20 May 1931) was an English first-class cricketer active 1878–86 who played for Middlesex. He was born in Paddington; died in Marylebone.
