= Dean of York =

Person responsible York Minster cathedral's running

The dean of York is the member of the clergy who is responsible for the running of the York Minster cathedral. As well as being the head of the cathedral church of the diocese and the metropolitical church of the province, the dean of York holds preeminence as the Province of York vicar.

Since 1939, the deans have resided at York Deanery.

== List of deans ==
The following is a list of the deans from 11th century to the present day:

=== High Medieval ===
- 1093–c. 1135 Hugh
- c. 1138–1143 William of St. Barbara
- c. 1147–1157 Robert of Ghent
- 1158–1186 Robert Butevilain
- 1186–1189 Hubert Walter
- 1189–1194 Henry Marshal
- 1194–1214 Simon of Apulia
- 1214–? William Testard
- c. 1217–c. 1220 Hamo
- 1220–1233 Roger de Insula
- 1233–1238 Geoffrey de Norwich
- 1239–1243 Fulk Basset
- 1244–1249 Walter of Kirkham
- c. 1252–1256 Sewal de Bovil
- 1257–1258 Godfrey Ludham
- 1258–1260 Roger de Holderness (alias Skeffling)
- c. 1262–1279 William Langton
- 1279–1290 Robert de Scarborough
- 1290–1297 Henry of Newark

=== Late Medieval ===
- 1296–1307 William Hambleton
- 1307–1310 Raymond de Goth
- 1310–1312 William Pickering
- 1312–1333 Robert Pickering
- 1333–1336 William de Colby
- 1336–1340 William Zouche
- 1342–1343 Hélie de Talleyrand-Périgord
- 1366–1380 Cardinal Angelicus Grimaud
- 1382–1385 Cardinal Adam Easton
- 1385–1395 Edmund Stafford
- 1395–1397 Roger Walden
- 1398–1400 Richard Clifford
- 1401–1406 Thomas Langley
- 1406–1416 John Prophet
- 1416–1420 Thomas Polton
- 1420–1425 William Grey
- 1426–1436 Robert Gilbert
- 1436–1451 William Felter
- 1452–1477 Richard Andrew
- 1477–1488 Robert Booth
- 1488–1494 Christopher Urswick (also Archdeacon of Wilts, and Archdeacon of Richmond (from 1494))
- 1494–1496 William Sheffield
- 1497–1503 Geoffrey Blythe

=== Early modern ===
- 1503–1507 Christopher Bainbridge
- 1508–1512 James Harrington
- 1513–1514 Thomas Wolsey
- 1514–1516 John Yonge
- 1516–1539 Brian Higden
- 1539–1544 Richard Layton
- 1544–1567 Nicholas Wotton
- 1567–1589 Matthew Hutton
- 1589–1617 John Thornborough
- 1617–1624 George Meriton
- 1625–1644 John Scott
- 1644–1660 Abolished – Commonwealth & Protectorate
- 1660–1663 Richard Marshe
- Jan–Nov 1664 William Sancroft
- 1664–1677 Robert Hitch (also Archdeacon of the East Riding until 1675)
- 1677–1697 Tobias Wickham
- 1697–1702 Thomas Gale
- 1702–1728 Henry Finch
- 1728–1747 Richard Osbaldeston
- 1747–1802 John Fountayne

=== Late modern ===
- 1802–1822 George Markham
- 1823–1858 William Cockburn
- 1858–1880 Augustus Duncombe
- 1880–1916 Arthur Purey-Cust
- 1917–1925 William Foxley Norris
- 1926–1932 Lionel Ford
- 1932–1941 Herbert Bate
- 1941–1963 Eric Milner-White
- 1964–1975 Alan Richardson
- 1975–1984 Ronald Jasper
- 1984–1994 John Southgate
- 1994–2003 Raymond Furnell
- 2004–2012 Keith Jones
- December 2012 – 2018 Viv Faull
- 25 June 2018 – 2 February 2019 Peter Moger, Canon Precentor and Acting Dean
- 2 February 2019 – 18 January 2022 Jonathan Frost (became Bishop of Portsmouth)
- 19 January 2022 – 12 November 2022 Michael Smith, Canon Pastor and Acting Dean
- 12 November 2022 – present Dominic Barrington

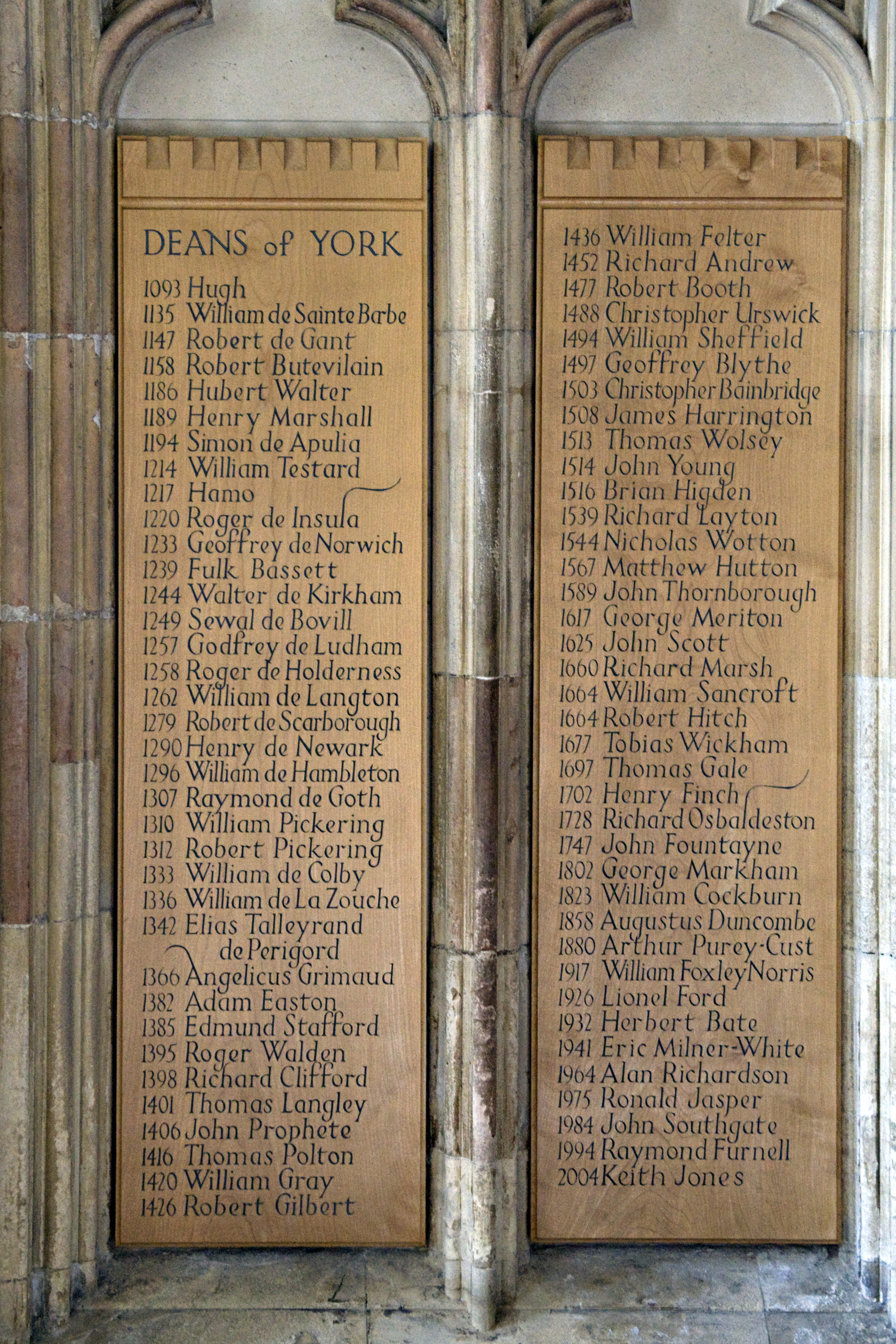
Plaque in York Minster listing the Deans of York

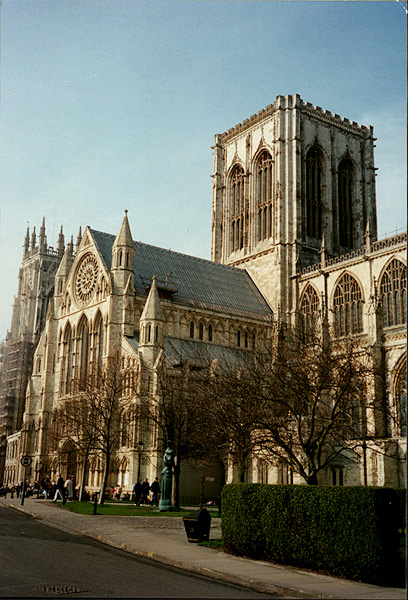
York Minster

== Sources ==
- Fryde, E. B.; Greenway, D. E.; Porter, S.; Roy, I., eds. (1986). Handbook of British Chronology (3rd, reprinted 2003 ed.). Cambridge: Cambridge University Press. ISBN 0-521-56350-X.
- Greenway, D. E. (1999). "Deans of York". Fasti Ecclesiae Anglicanae 1066–1300: Volume 6 - York Diocese. British History Online.
- Horn, J. M.; Smith, D. M. (1975). "Deans of York". Fasti Ecclesiae Anglicanae 1541–1857: Volume 4 - York Diocese. British History Online.
- Jones, B. (1963). "Deans of York". Fasti Ecclesiae Anglicanae 1300–1541: Volume 6 - Northern Province (York, Carlise and Durham). British History Online.
