= Francis Ford (cricketer) =

English cricketer (1866–1940)

Cricket information
- Batting: Left-handed
- Bowling: Slow left-arm orthodox

International information
- National side: England
- Test debut: 14 December 1894 v Australia
- Last Test: 6 March 1895 v Australia

Career statistics
Competition	Tests	First-class
Matches	5	168
Runs scored	168	7,359
Batting average	18.66	27.05
100s/50s	0/0	14/30
Top score	48	191
Balls bowled	204	10,203
Wickets	1	200
Bowling average	129.00	23.78
5 wickets in innings	0	8
10 wickets in match	0	1
Best bowling	1/47	7/65
Catches/stumpings	5/0	131/0
- Source: CricketArchive, 8 April 2019

Francis Gilbertson Justice Ford (14 December 1866 – 7 February 1940) was a cricketer.

Francis Ford was educated at Repton School and King's College, Cambridge. He played first-class cricket for Middlesex County Cricket Club, Cambridge and the Marylebone Cricket Club between 1886 and 1899 as a useful left-handed batsman and slow left-arm orthodox bowler. He also played five Test matches for England on their tour to Australia in 1894-95. Gilbert Jessop said that Ford was the most graceful of left-handed batsmen. He top scored with 191 when Cambridge University made its highest ever total of 703/9 v Sussex in 1890. His Wisden obituary said “His drives, either kept down or lifted over the bowler's head, were dazzling, and his cuts the perfection of timing. He revelled in these strokes when fast bowlers lost their length because of his punishment, and at Lord's the crowds grew enthusiastic over the way he scored from the best fast bowlers--Arthur Mold of Lancashire, Tom Richardson and Bill Lockwood of Surrey, suffered specially at his hands.”

Ford, who was nicknamed "Stork" on account of his height, was part of a large cricketing family, with his father W.A., two brothers A.F.J., L.G.B.J. and W.J., a nephew Neville Ford, great-nephew John Barclay and uncle G.J.Ford all playing first-class cricket.

His uncle was Horace A. Ford known as one of the greatest target archers of all time; his grandfather was George Samuel Ford.
