= Chantry House, Bunbury =

Building in Bunbury, Cheshire, England

Coordinates: 53°07′01″N 2°38′47″W

The Chantry House
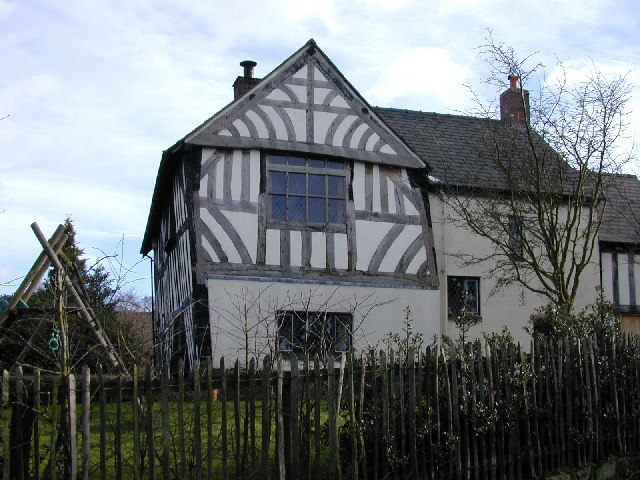
- Gable end of the Chantry House, Bunbury
- Interactive map of the The Chantry House area

General information
- Architectural style: Medieval, Timber-framed
- Location: Wyche Road, Bunbury, Cheshire, England

Height
- Roof: Slate

Technical details
- Structural system: Timber framing
- Floor count: Two

Listed Building – Grade II*
- Official name: The Chantry House
- Designated: 12 January 1967
- Reference no.: 1138635

The Chantry House, also known as the Chantry Priests' (or Priest's) House and formerly the Old School House, is a medieval half-timbered or "black-and-white" house, dating from around 1527, (Note: The date is generally given as 1527, but might be slightly later.) in Bunbury, Cheshire, England. It was originally associated with the chantry chapel in the nearby parish church of St Boniface, founded by Sir Ralph Egerton. After the chantry's dissolution, it became associated with Thomas Aldersey's grammar school. The Chantry House is an early surviving example of a residential timber-framed building in Cheshire, with many typically medieval features. It is listed at grade II* for "the quality of framing throughout."

== History ==
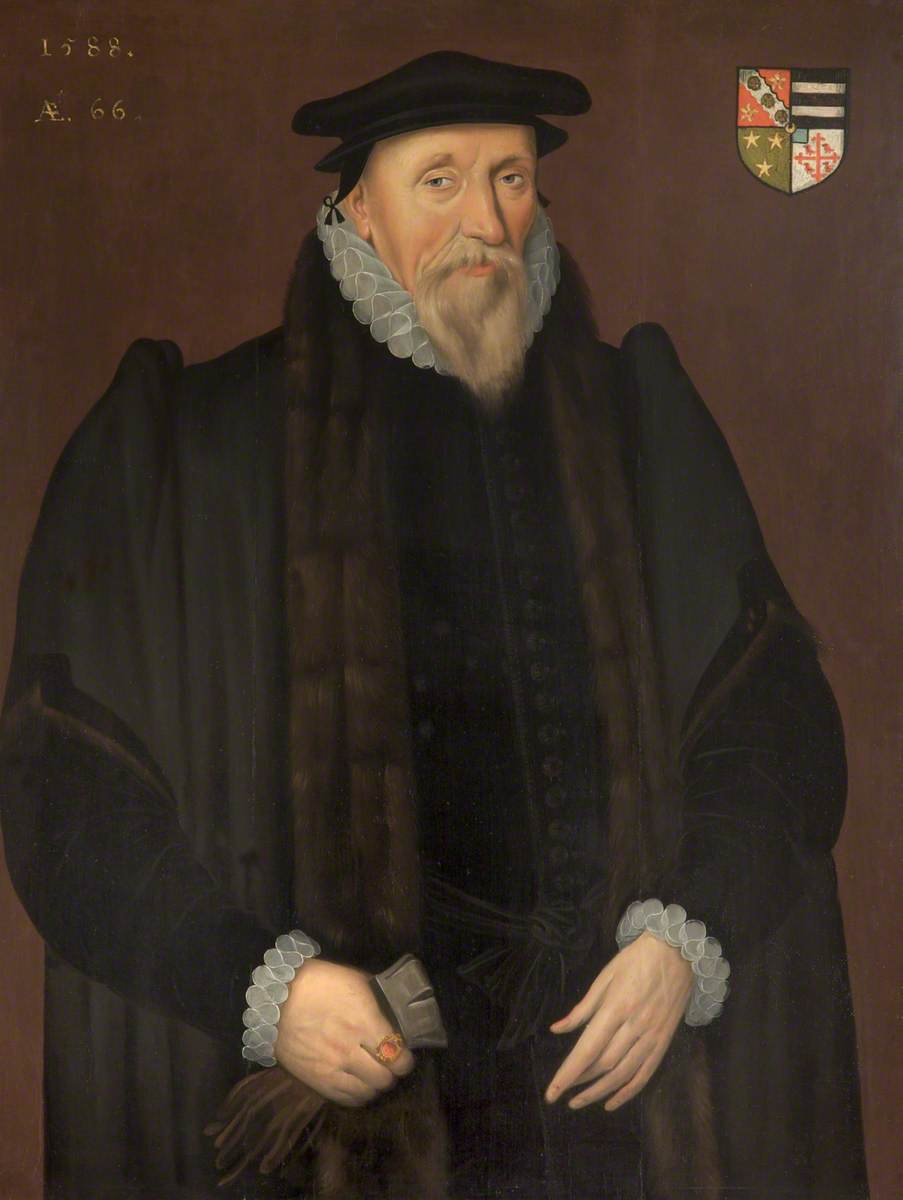
Thomas Aldersey, by Robert Peake the Elder (1588)

Sir Ralph Egerton (also Raufe or Rafe; before 1476–1528) – standard bearer to Henry VIII, who awarded him the nearby manor of Ridley – commissioned a chantry chapel to be added to St Boniface's Church in Bunbury. The chantry (known as the Ridley Chapel) was begun by 1527, but remained incomplete at Egerton's death in 1528, and was finished under the provisions of his will. The Chantry House was built at the same time to house two chantry priests, who were "to pray for his Soul, his Father and Mother's Soul, with all other Souls of his kin, and all Christian Souls forever." According to Egerton's will, the Chantry House was to be constructed with stone and roofed in Welsh slate, and was to have two rooms, a parlour and a buttery–kitchen. The chantry was endowed with mills at Nantwich and a salt house. After Edward VI dissolved the chantries in 1547, the Chantry House was granted by the crown to Thomas Bromley of Nantwich in 1549. The chantry's value at the time of its dissolution was estimated to be £12 2 shillings.

The property was subsequently acquired by Thomas Aldersey (1521/2–98), a successful London merchant and haberdasher who had been born and educated in Bunbury, possibly at the Chantry House, and whose family had a house in the adjacent parish of Spurstow. In 1575 he founded a school in Bunbury, which was incorporated as a free grammar school on 2 January 1594, under the name "The Free Grammar School of Thomas Aldersey in Bunbury". Aldersey gave the grammar school to the Worshipful Company of Haberdashers, of which he was a prominent member. It was the first school that the Company of Haberdashers administered. Among the school's endowments was the 2000-year lease to its governors, dated 31 March 1595, of the Chantry House, together with other land and properties in Bunbury, for "the rent of a red rose". The school either used the Chantry House as its school house or was built adjacent to it, with the Chantry House being used as the schoolmaster's house and to house boarders.

The grammar school moved to a new building on School Lane in 1874, and is now Bunbury Aldersey School. The Chantry House was restored and extended in the 1970s by Cecil F. Wright. It is now a private residence.

== Description ==
The Chantry House is located at SJ5683757958 on Wyche Road in Bunbury, Cheshire, immediately south of St Boniface's Church. It is listed at grade II*, a grade which recognises "particularly important buildings of more than special interest." It was formerly known as the Old School House. Earthworks, possibly representing foundations of formerly associated buildings, lie to the east of the existing building. The original three-bay, two-storey, timber-framed house rests on a sandstone plinth, with a slate roof. The introduction of an upper storey is a late-medieval feature in Cheshire buildings. The windows are not original; they have mullions and transoms, and contain leaded glass. An additional wing to the south was added in the 1970s.

The timber frame is close studded, with the vertical timbers placed particularly close together. The east face has a jettied gable. The intervening panels are plastered.Horizontal rails are absent from the exterior frame, except as needed to frame windows. This is typical of medieval timber framing. Unusually, two different types of bracing are present. Curved tension braces, starting from the horizontal ground sill, are found on the ground floor; these are rare in Cheshire, being more commonly found in south-east England. The first floor features arch braces, which start from vertical timbers and go up to meet the wall plate; these are typical of the Midlands variety of timber framing. Both forms of brace are large. In later close-studded or decorative-framed buildings these braces were typically concealed or omitted.

The Chantry House is an early surviving example of a residential timber-framed building in Cheshire. Its framing is similar to that of Gawsworth Old Rectory, a 15th-century Cheshire house also built to accommodate a priest, which combines close studding with arch bracing, but lacks the Chantry House's tension braces. Both Cheshire buildings include more horizontal timbers than comparable buildings in the south east, such as the Guildhall and Wool Hall of Lavenham, Suffolk, which Cheshire buildings expert Laurie McKenna considers might indicate the beginning of the development of a distinct Midlands style of timber framing.

The timber frame to the interior includes a horizontal middle rail. The beams are deeply bevelled and the bevelled joists resemble planks, both features typical of medieval timbering. There are four Tudor-arched fireplaces in stone, surmounted by very large lintels. On the first floor, part of the original oak panelling has survived, and includes internal doors, one of which has retained its original hinges.

== See also ==
- Listed buildings in Bunbury, Cheshire

== Notes and references ==
Notes

Sources

- Joan Beck. Tudor Cheshire, A History of Cheshire Vol. 7 (J. J. Bagley, ed.) (The Cheshire Community Council; 1969)
- Cheshire Federation of Women's Institutes. The Cheshire Village Book (Countryside Books and CFWI; 1990) (ISBN 1-85306-075-5)
- Arthur Collins. The Peerage of England (W. Strahan, J. F and C. Rivington; 1741)
- James Hall. A History of the Town and Parish of Nantwich, or Wich-Malbank, in the County Palatine of Chester (1883)
- Clare Hartwell, Matthew Hyde, Edward Hubbard, Nikolaus Pevsner. The Buildings of England: Cheshire (Yale University Press; 2011) (ISBN 978-0-300-17043-6)
- His Majesty's Commissioners on Charitable Foundations. An Account of Public Charities in England and Wales (W. Simpkin and R. Marshall; 1828)
- Laurie McKenna. Timber Framed Buildings in Cheshire (Cheshire County Council; 1994) (ISBN 0-906765-16-1)
- David Mills. Recycling the Cycle: The City of Chester and Its Whitsun Plays (University of Toronto Press; 1998) (ISBN 0802040969)
- Nikolaus Pevsner, Edward Hubbard. The Buildings of England: Cheshire (Penguin Books; 1971) (ISBN 0 14 0710 42 6)
