= Aldersey (surname) =

Aldersey is a surname. Notable people with the surname include:

- Laurence Aldersey (fl. 1581–1586), English explorer
- Margaret Aldersley (1852–1940) – British textile worker, suffragist and trade unionist
- Mary Ann Aldersey (1797–1868), English Christian missionary
- Olympia Aldersey (born 1992), Australian rower
- Thomas Aldersey (1521/2–1598), English merchant and philanthropist

== See also ==
- Hugh Aldersey-Williams (born 1959), English writer and journalist
