= William Hinde =

William Hinde may refer to:

- William Hinde (priest) (1569–1629), English clergyman and writer
- William Hinde (British Army officer) (1900–1981), British soldier and polo player
