= Thomas Lindsay =

Thomas Lindsay may refer to:

- Thomas Lindsay (academic), American educator and academic
- Thomas Lindsay (bishop) (1656–1724), Anglican clergyman, Archbishop of Armagh
- Thomas Martin Lindsay (1843–1914), Scottish historian
- Thomas Lindsay (priest) (died 1947), Archdeacon of Cleveland
- Tom Lindsay (rugby union) (born 1987), English rugby union player
- Tom Lindsay (footballer) (1903–1979), Scottish footballer

== See also ==
- Tom Lindsey, Canadian politician
