= James Fall =

James Fall may refer to:

- James Fall (politician), Scottish member of parliament for Haddington Burghs
- James Fall (priest), English Anglican priest
- Jim Fall, American film and television director and film producer
