= Christopher Malton =

16th-century English priest

Christopher Malton was a 16th century English priest.

Malton was educated at Christ Church, Oxford. He held livings at Holcot, Lilley, Maids Moreton and Sywell. He was Archdeacon of Cleveland from 1564 until his death on 24 March 1570.

Church of England titles
Preceded by John Warner	Archdeacon of Cleveland; 1564–1570	Succeeded by Ralph Coulton
