= Amanda Bloor =

Anglican priest

The Venerable Amanda Bloor
- Archdeacon of Cleveland
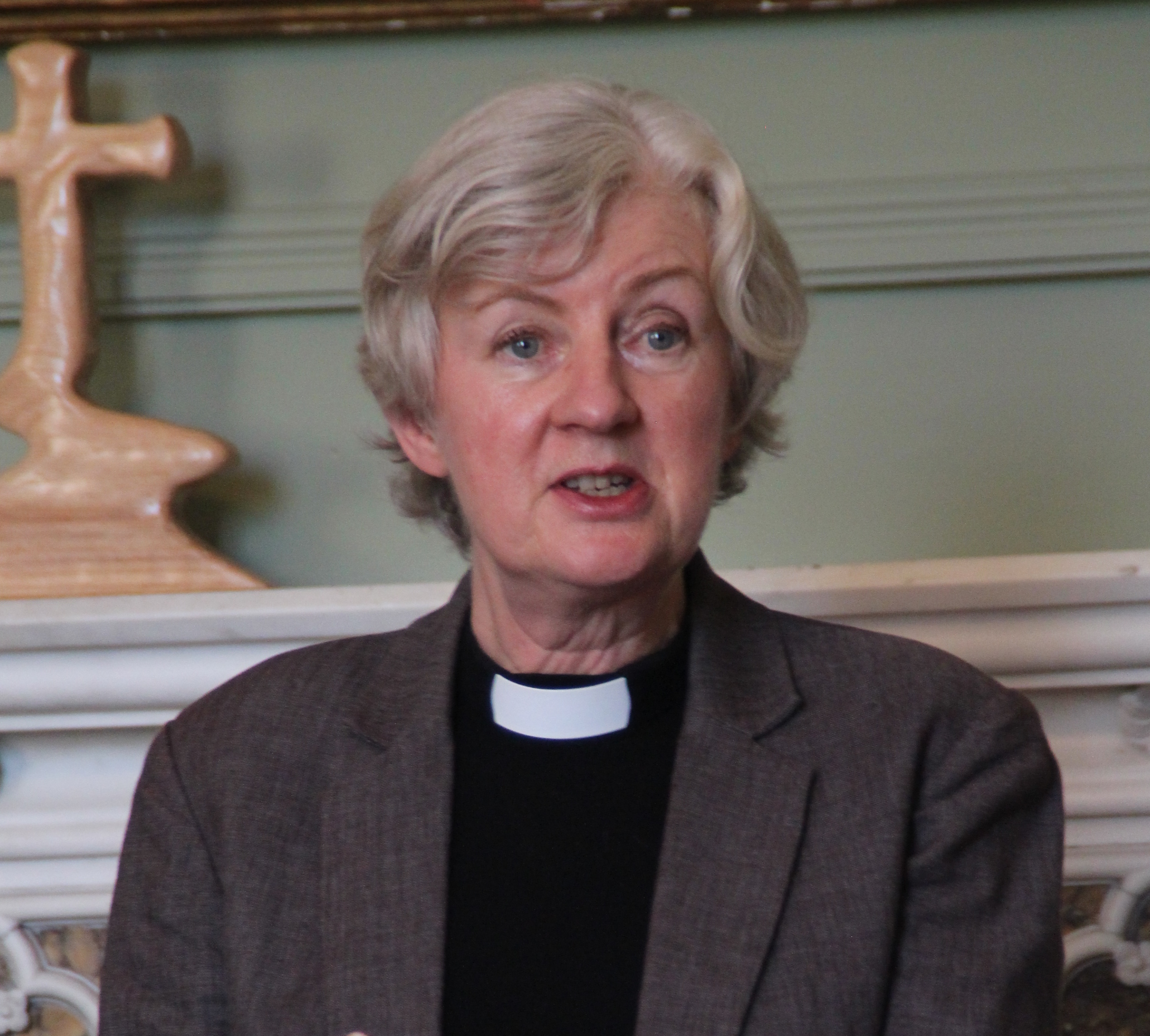
- Archdeacon Bloor in 2024
- Church: Church of England
- Diocese: Diocese of York
- In office: 15 June 2020 to present
- Predecessor: Sam Rushton

Personal details
- Born: 1962 (age 63–64)
- Denomination: Anglicanism

Amanda Elaine Bloor (born 1962) is a British Anglican priest. Since June 2020, she has served as Archdeacon of Cleveland in the Diocese of York.

Bloor was previously involved in parish ministry: first as a curate (2004–2007) in the Diocese of Oxford and then as priest-in-charge of Holy Trinity, Bembridge (2015–2020) in the Diocese of Portsmouth. She was also domestic chaplain to the Bishop of Oxford from 2007 to 2013, and diocesan advisor in women's ministry for the Diocese of Oxford from 2013 to 2015. In addition to her archdeacon role, she has served as warden of readers for the Diocese of York since December 2020.
