= Basil Carter =

The Venerable (Anthony) Basil Carter (27 April 1881 – 14 March 1942) was Archdeacon of Cleveland from 1938 until his death.

The son of The Rev. Charles Clement Carter, he was educated at Trinity College, Dublin. Carter was a teacher from 1900 to 1907 when he entered Ripon College Cuddesdon. After curacies in Battersea and Armley he was a Chaplain to the Forces from 1916 to 1917. He held incumbencies in Leeds (1917–1922); Ilkley (1922–1930); Scarborough (1930–1936); and Stokesley (1936–1938).

Church of England titles
Preceded by Thomas Enraght Lindsay	Archdeacon of Cleveland; 1938–1942	Succeeded by Edmund Hope
