= Jaques Sterne =

Jaques Sterne (29 June 1695 in Woodhouse – 9 June 1759 in Rise) was a cleric and politician in the mid 18th century. He was educated at Jesus College, Cambridge. He was ordained in 1720. He held livings at Rise and Hornsea. He was Archdeacon of Cleveland from 1735 until 1750; and then of East Riding from 1750 until 1755. His Alumni Cantabrigienses entry describes him as a

"A well known and eccentric figure in York- a violent Whig politician"

Church of England titles
Preceded by John Richardson	Archdeacon of Cleveland; 1735–1750	Succeeded by Francis Blackburne
Preceded by Heneage Dering	Archdeacon of the East Riding; 1750–1755	Succeeded by Robert Oliver
