= William Hey =

William Hey may refer to:

- William Hey (surgeon) (1736–1819), English surgeon
- William Hey (judge) (c. 1733–1797), chief justice of Quebec and member of parliament for Sandwich
- William Hey (priest) (1811–1882), archdeacon of Cleveland
