= Barnabas Long =

Archdeacon of Cleveland

Barnabas Long or Longe was Archdeacon of Cleveland from 1683 to 1685.

Long was born in Pontefract was educated at University College, Oxford. He became Vicar of Selborne in 1680; Chancellor of Llandaff in 1681, Canon of York in 1682; Rector of Fyfield in 1684, and of Oddington that same year.

He died on 11 April 1865.

Church of England titles
| Preceded by John Lake | Archdeacon of Cleveland; 1683–1685 | Succeeded by John Burton |
