= Close studding =

Form of timber work

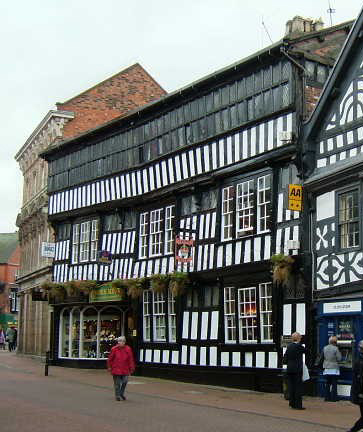
Crown Hotel, Nantwich, an example of late 16th century close studding

Close studding is a form of timber work used in timber-framed buildings in which vertical timbers (studs) are set close together, dividing the wall into narrow panels. Rather than being a structural feature, the primary aim of close studding is to produce an impressive front.

Close studding first appeared in England in the 13th century and was commonly used there from the mid-15th century until the end of the 17th century. It was also common in France from the 15th century.

== Description ==
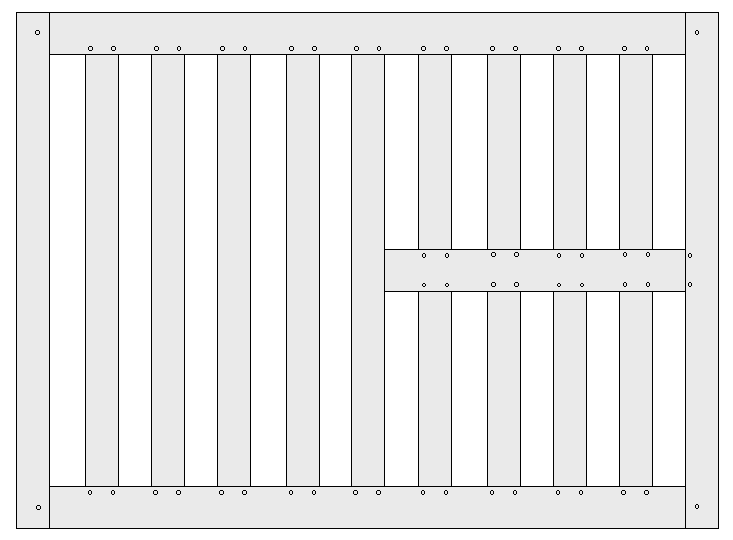
Close studding with (right) and without (left) middle rail. Braces are not shown

Although close studding is defined by the distance between the vertical timbers, the spacing used is variable, up to a maximum of around 2 feet (600 mm). Studs can either span the full height of the storey or be divided by a middle (or intermediate) rail. To give the frame stability, some form of diagonal bracing is required. Limewash and coloured paints would have been used to enhance the pattern.

== History and usage ==
The use of close studding possibly originated in East Anglia, where the technique was employed in the earliest surviving timber walls thought to date from the early 13th century. Among the earliest examples outside East Anglia are St Michael's Church, Baddiley in Cheshire (1308) and Mancetter Manor in Warwickshire (c. 1330). It became fashionable in England around 1400, and by the middle of the 15th century close studding was widely used across that country. Its popularity coincided with the dominance of the Perpendicular style of architecture, with its emphasis on verticals. Close studding remained in common use in England until the end of the 17th century. Close-studded buildings dating from the 15th and 16th centuries are also seen in France, and some experts believe the technique might have originated there. Close studding is very common in the Normandy region of France.

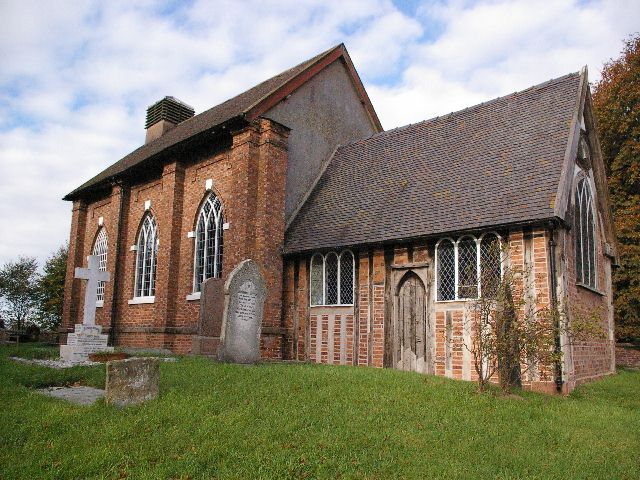
St Michael's Church, Baddiley, one of the oldest surviving close-studded buildings

Compared with square framing, close studding uses a lot of timber and is time-consuming to construct; it was therefore particularly employed for buildings of relatively high status. Public buildings such as guildhalls, market halls, churches and inns often employed close studding. It was also used for private houses of the wealthy, particularly townhouses but also the more prosperous farmhouses. Close studding was not usually employed in outbuildings, although occasional examples exist, such as the Gunthwaite Hall barn in Barnsley. Although most examples occur in entirely timber-framed buildings, close studding was also used on the upper storeys of houses with a stone or brick ground storey; examples include the Dragon Hall in Norwich and the Café 'Cave St-Vincent' in Compiègne, France.

With its lavish use of timber, close studding was extravagant and was seen as a status symbol. This led to it being faked with paint or even cosmetic planking. The heavy timber consumption probably also contributed to the decline in the use of close studding from the end of the 17th century, with a reduced supply of domestic hardwood as well as increased competition for timber.

== Variations ==
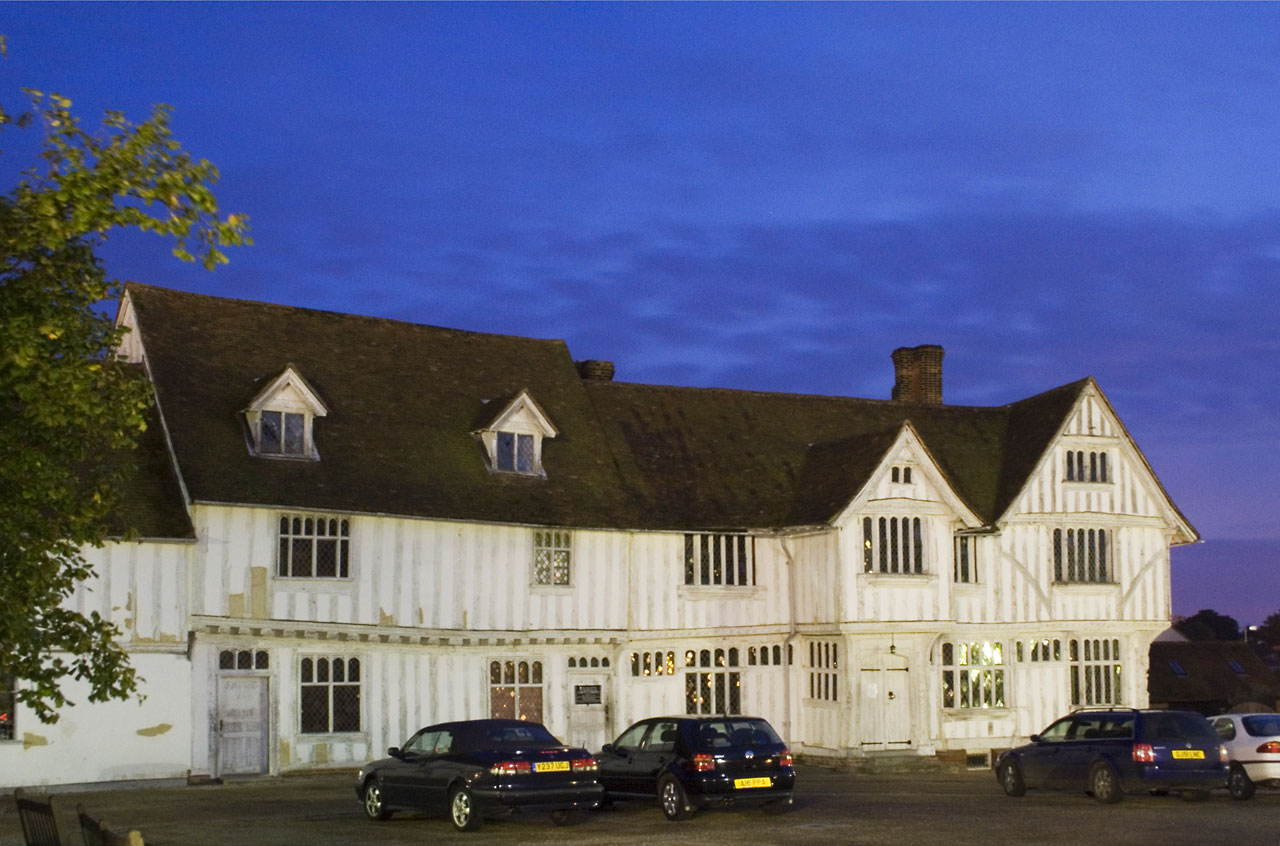
Guildhall, Lavenham, an example of close studding of the East Anglia school

Regional variation occurred across England in the use of the middle rail, which was common in the midlands but rare in the east and south east. Variation in bracing is also seen. Some close-studded buildings, mainly dated before the mid-16th century, have arch or tension bracing to the exterior; examples include the Guildhall in Lavenham and the Chantry House in Bunbury. In later use, however, braces were usually constructed on the interior and concealed by plaster panelling.

Close studding was sometimes used in association with decorative panel work or close panelling, particularly from the end of the 16th century. In such buildings, the lower storey would usually employ close studding, while the upper storeys would have small square panels with or without ornamentation. Examples include the White Lion in Congleton and Moat Farm in Longdon. An ornamental effect was also sometimes obtained with herringbone or chevron bracing between the uprights.

== Selected examples ==
Good examples of the various forms of the technique include:

=== Churches ===
- Church of St James and St Paul, Marton, Cheshire: close studding with middle rail (c. 1370)
- St Michael's Church, Baddiley, Cheshire: the chancel has close studding without a middle rail, with later brick infill (1308)
- St Michael and All Angels Church, Altcar, West Lancashire: mostly close studded with middle rail (a much later example of 1879)
- St Peter's Church, Melverley, Shropshire: close studding with middle rail (late 15th century)

=== Inns and cafés ===
- Bear's Head Hotel, Brereton, Cheshire: close studding with two rails (1615)
- Café 'Cave St-Vincent', Compiègne, France: close studding with braces on upper storey over brick ground floor with stone trimming (15th century)
- Crown Hotel, Nantwich, Cheshire: close studding on all three storeys with middle rail (c. 1584)
- String of Horses Inn, originally at Frankwell, Shrewsbury, Shropshire, now at Avoncroft Museum of Historic Buildings: close studding with middle rail on both ground and first storeys (1576)
- White Lion, Congleton, Cheshire: lower storey has close studding, with decorative panelling above (early 16th century)
- The Falcon, Chester, Cheshire, formerly a town house, now a public house, which has close studding on its east front at the level of the Chester Rows.

=== Private houses ===
- Chantry House, Bunbury, Cheshire: very close studding, with tension braces and arch bracing and no middle rail. (1527)
- Gawsworth Old Rectory, Gawsworth, Cheshire: close studding with middle rail and arch bracing (late 16th century)
- Greyfriars, Worcester, Worcestershire: close studding with middle rail to both storeys (c.1480–1500)
- Mancetter Manor, Mancetter, Warwickshire: close studding with plaster infill (c. 1330)
- Moat Farm, Longdon, Worcestershire: close studding with middle rail on ground floor; upper floor mixes square framing and decorative panelling
- Moss Hall, Audlem, Cheshire: close studding with middle rails to each storey, with no decorative panelling (1616)
- Paycocke's, Coggeshall, Essex: the main elevation has close studding on both storeys, with a middle rail on the ground floor (c. 1500)

=== Public halls ===
- Booth Hall or Round House, Evesham, Worcestershire: close studding with middle rail on all three storeys (late 15th century)
- Dragon Hall, Norwich, Norfolk: close studding without middle rail to first floor, over brick and flint ground floor (14th century)
- Guildhall, Lavenham, Suffolk: close studding to all storeys, with tension braces and no middle rail (early 16th century)
- Moot Hall, Fordwich, Kent: close-studded overhanging first storey with brick or plaster infill and no middle rail; the ground floor in brick and flint was rebuilt at a later date (early 15th century)
- Town residence, Albi, France: close studding on three storeys (16th century)

== See also ==
- Poteaux-sur-sol construction in the historical region of North America known as New France, which can have a similar appearance

== Notes and references ==
=== Sources ===
- Harris R. Discovering Timber-framed Buildings (Shire Publications, Princes Risborough; 2003) (ISBN 0-7478-0215-7)
- McKenna L. Timber Framed Buildings in Cheshire (Cheshire County Council; 1994) (ISBN 0-906765-16-1)
- Brooks A, Pevsner N. Worcestershire: The Buildings of England (revised edn) (Yale University Press; 2007) (ISBN 0-300-11298-X)
