= Henry Thurscross =

English Anglican cleric

Henry Thurscross was Archdeacon of Cleveland from 1619 to 1635.

Thurcross was educated at Magdalen College, Oxford. He held livings at Catterick, Winston, Langton, Stokesley and Kirkby Moorside.

Church of England titles
Preceded by John Phillips (bishop of Sodor and Man)	Archdeacon of Cleveland; 1619–1635	Succeeded by Timothy Thurscross
