= Spurstow =

Village in Cheshire, England

Coordinates: 53.10853°N 2.66101°W

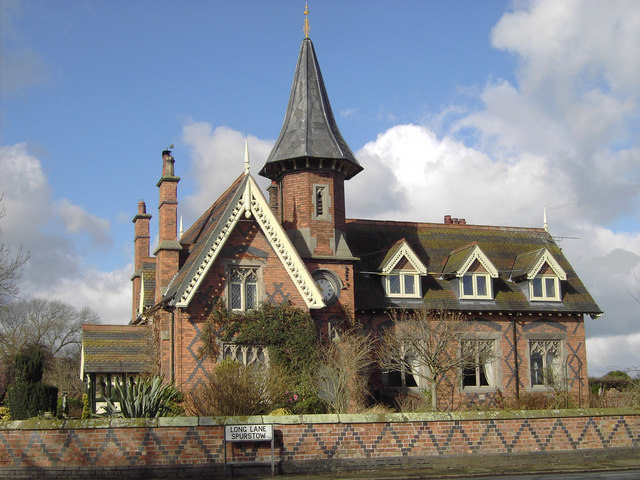
- The former schoolhouse, Spurstow

- Location within Cheshire
- Population: 413 (2011 Census)
- OS grid reference: SJ558570
- Civil parish: Spurstow
- Unitary authority: Cheshire East
- Ceremonial county: Cheshire
- Region: North West
- Country: England
- Sovereign state: United Kingdom
- Post town: TARPORLEY
- Postcode district: CW6
- Dialling code: 01829
- Police: Cheshire
- Fire: Cheshire
- Ambulance: North West
- UK Parliament: Chester South and Eddisbury

Spurstow is a village and civil parish in the unitary authority of Cheshire East and the ceremonial county of Cheshire, England, which is located 6½ miles to the north west of Nantwich. The parish also includes the settlement of Spurstow Sketh and part of Radmore Green. The total population is a little over 400 people. Nearby villages include Bunbury, Haughton and Peckforton. The parish is mentioned in the Domesday Book of 1086 and contains a salt spring, which was formerly used as a spa.

== History ==
Spurstow appears as "Spuretone" in the Domesday Book of 1086; it was then held by Robert FitzHugh, and around 180 acres had been cleared for agricultural use. Remains of a medieval village have been found somewhat to the north west of the existing village of Spurstow, which is believed to have subsequently contracted or moved. William de Spurstowe held the manor of Spurstow in the 13th century, and it remained in the hands of the de Spurstowe family until 1685, when it was purchased by the Crewe family. Lower Spurstow was owned by the Aldersey family from the mid-15th century; they lived in the half-timbered Lower Spurstow Hall, which was demolished in around 1891. A silver-gilt crucifix designed to be worn on a chain, dating from the late 14th to early 15th century, was found in the civil parish in 2000.

The area was historically important in salt extraction, with an 18th-century brine spa known as Spurstow White Water or Spurstow Spa, which was credited with health-giving effects. The spa still existed in the mid-19th century, when it appeared in the Topographical Dictionary of England (1848) by Samuel Lewis, who wrote "A mineral spring called Spurstow Spa was formerly much frequented, and baths were erected by Sir Thomas Mostyn, for the accommodation of visiters; but the waters are not at present in repute." A school was built by Hungerford Crewe, Lord Crewe in 1872. The village's shop and post office closed in the 1970s, and the school's closure followed in 1983.

== Governance ==
Spurstow is administered by the Spurstow Parish Council. From 1974 the civil parish was served by Crewe and Nantwich Borough Council, which was succeeded on 1 April 2009 by the unitary authority of Cheshire East. Since 2024 Spurstow has been within the parliamentary constituency of Chester South and Eddisbury which is represented by Aphra Brandreth.

== Geography and transport ==
The majority of the civil parish is relatively flat, sloping gently upwards from north to south with an average elevation of around 70–80 metres; the south of the parish, towards Ridley, slopes upwards more steeply, with a high point of around 120 metres. Two brooks cross the parish running broadly east–west, and there is a saline spring within a small area of woodland named Spa Plantation or Bath Wood in the south of the parish at SJ57485481. The A49 runs north–south through the west of the civil parish. It connects to Long Lane which runs south east to Haughton and Radmore Green, with two other lanes splitting from it: Bunbury Lane runs north to Lower Bunbury, and Capper's Lane runs south east to the boundary with Brindley. Additionally, Badcock's Lane runs east connecting the A49 with Long Lane and Capper's Lane, and Peckforton Hall Lane runs west connecting the A49 with Peckforton. The A534 runs north-west to south-east immediately south of the parish boundary.

== Demography ==
According to the 2001 Census, the parish had a population of 394, increasing to 413 in 164 households at the 2011 Census. This represents a decline from the population in 1851 but an increase since 1951; historical population figures are 339 (1801), 562 (1851), 434 (1901) and 323 (1951). The population density was 0.6 persons/hectare in 2011, well below the average of 3.2 persons/hectare for Cheshire East.

== Landmarks ==
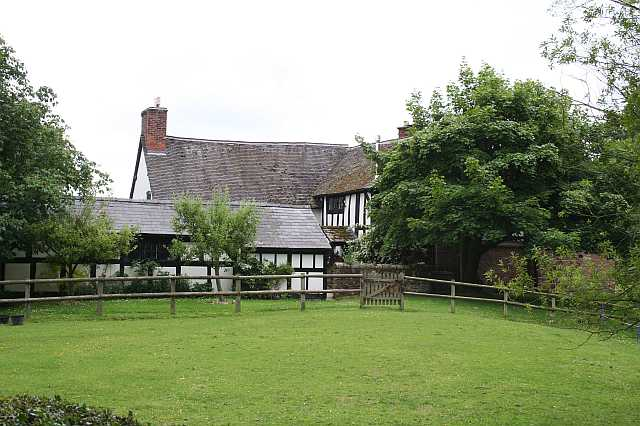
Bath House, Lower Spurstow

The remains of a medieval village are present at SJ5553157178 near Haycroft, with six house platforms and evidence of medieval ridge and furrow ploughing.

Bath House is a half-timbered house at SJ5695155324 in Lower Spurstow, dating from the late 16th century, which might have housed visitors to the nearby saline spring. The oldest listed building in the civil parish, it is designated grade II*. Several 17th-century farmhouses and cottages, many of which are also timber framed, are listed at the lower grade of II: Haycroft Farm, Dolphin Cottage, Lower Hall Cottage, Spurstow Hall Cottages, Talbarn (originally a barn), The Butlands and The Cottage in Spurstow village. All that is left of the demolished Lower Spurstow Hall are its grade-II-listed red sandstone gate piers, dating from the late 17th century, which are topped by pineapple-shaped finials.

A former Methodist chapel in chequered brick, dated 1844, stands off Peckforton Hall Lane; it was originally Primitive Methodist. Two grade-II-listed buildings were erected by Hungerford Crewe in the early 1870s; the former Spurstow School was designed in the Gothic Revival style by Thomas Bower and is built in red and blue brick with the tiles forming red and blue stripes; and Spurstow Smithy is a red-brick building with cast-iron lattice windows bearing the Crewe emblem. The 19th-century Spurstow Hall was a model farm on the Crewe estate.

== Notable residents ==
One of the seats of the Aldersey family, Lower Spurstow Hall, was in Spurstow. Notable members of that family who lived in the parish include the explorer Laurence Aldersey (1546–97/8) and Thomas Aldersey (1521/2–1598), a merchant, MP and philanthropist who founded a grammar school in Bunbury.

== Education ==
As of 2016, there are no schools within the civil parish, though the 19th-century Spurstow schoolhouse survives as a grade II listed private house. Spurstow falls within the catchment areas of Bunbury Aldersey Church of England Primary School in Bunbury and Tarporley High School and Sixth Form College in Tarporley.

== See also ==
- Listed buildings in Spurstow
