= Edmund Hope =

Cleric of the Church of England

The Venerable Edmund Hope was Archdeacon of Cleveland from 1942 until his death on 24 January 1947

Hope was educated at Keble College, Oxford. He was ordained Deacon in 1901, and Priest in 1902. After a curacy in Middlesbrough he held incumbencies at Marske-by-the-Sea, Mexborough and Beverley.

Church of England titles
Preceded by Anthony Basil Carter	Archdeacon of Cleveland; 1942–1947	Succeeded by George Frederick Townley
