= Raymond Furnell =

Raymond Furnell (18 May 1936 – 10 July 2006) was the Dean of York from 1994 to 2003.

His first ministry position was as a curate at Cannock, in the Diocese of Lichfield, from 1965 to 1969. From there, he moved to become vicar of Clayton part of Newcastle-under-Lyme, a position he held from 1969 to 1975. He then became Rural Dean for Stoke North — a post he held until 1981 when he became Provost of St Edmundsbury. He remained in that post until his move to York Minster in 1994. He retired from York Minster in late May 2003. Following his retirement, he returned to Bury St Edmunds but was a regular visitor to York. While Dean of York, he played a major role in the presentation of the York Mystery Plays to celebrate the Millennium.

Church of England titles
Preceded by David Maddock	Provost of St Edmundsbury; 1981–1994	Succeeded by James Atwell
Preceded by John Southgate	Dean of York; 1994–2003	Succeeded by Keith Jones
