= Henry Yeoman =

The Venerable Henry Walker Yeoman (b Whitby 21 November 1816; d Marske-by-the-Sea 30 March 1897) was Archdeacon of Cleveland from 1882 until his death.

Yeoman was educated at Trinity College, Cambridge; and ordained in 1840. He was Vicar of Marske-by-the-Sea from 1840 to 1850; and Rector of Moor Monkton from 1850 to 1870.

Church of England titles
Preceded by William Hey	Archdeacon of Cleveland; 1882–1897	Succeeded by William Hutchings
