= John Southgate =

English bishop (1926–1999)

John Eliot Southgate (2 September 1926 – 18 December 1999) was Dean of York in the Church of England; holding this post from 1984 until 1994 when he was succeeded by Raymond Furnell.

Southgate was educated at the City of Norwich School and received a Bachelor of Arts (BA) in Social Studies from Durham University in 1953 and a Diploma of Theology (DipTh) in 1955.

He was ordained deacon in 1955, and priest in 1956. He served curacies at Glen Parva and Lee, south-east London He was Vicar of Plumstead from 1962 to 1966; Rector of Old Charlton from 1966 to 1972; Dean of Greenwich from 1968 to 1972; York Diocesan Secretary for Mission and Evangelism from 1972 to 1981;Vicar of Harome 1972 to 1977; and Archdeacon of Cleveland from 1974 to 1984.

While Dean Southgate conducted the service, held in 1988, after the restoration of York Minster, which caught fire in 1984. The Minster was struck by lightning four days before the retirement of the previous dean, Ronald Jasper. Southgate was awarded an honorary doctorate by the University of York in 1989.

Church of England titles
Preceded by Stanley Linsley	Archdeacon of Cleveland; 1974–1984	Succeeded by Ronald John Woodley
Preceded by Ronald Claud Dudley Jasper	Dean of York; 1984–1994	Succeeded by Raymond Furnell
