= Ralph Egerton =

English courtier and administrator

Sir Ralph Egerton (died 4 March 1528) of Ridley, Cheshire was an English soldier knight.

The details of his birth are obscure but he undoubtedly belonged to the well-established Cheshire Egerton family.

As a young man he was introduced at court of Henry VII and granted a number of local posts but after the accession to the throne of the young Henry VIII he established a reputation as a fighting man in the tournaments. In 1513 he accompanied the King on his French campaign as his standard bearer and given charge of an infantry company which fought close to the king. In September 1513, after the taking of Tournai he was one of the 49 participants who were knighted by the king. He was later made standard-bearer for life and given the ownership of Ridley Hall, near Nantwich in Cheshire. He was henceforth referred to as Sir Ralph Egerton of Ridley.

He was appointed Ranger of Delamere Forest for life in 1514 and confirmed in his post as Constable of Chester the following year. In 1516 he was appointed High Sheriff of Flintshire for life.

In 1520 he accompanied the king and a large entourage of peers and knights to the renowned meeting in France with Francis I of France at the Field of the Cloth of Gold and was also in attendance at the subsequent meetings with Charles V, Holy Roman Emperor soon afterwards and again in 1522.

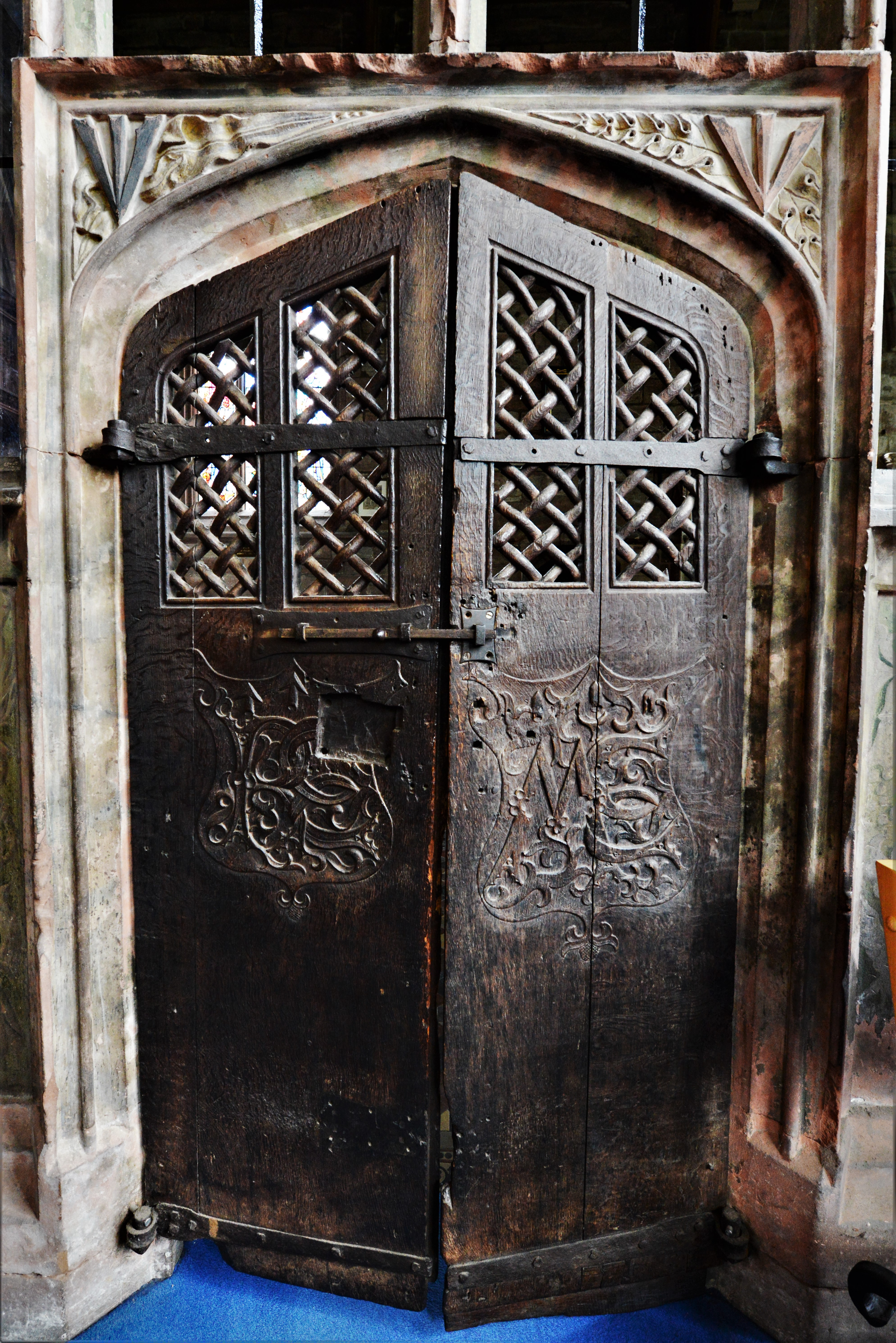
Entrance to Ridley chapel

In later life he exchanged his court position of Gentleman Usher to that of Knight of the Body and in 1524 surrendered his position as standard bearer, afterwards sharing the post jointly with Edward Guildford.

In 1524 he was a member, along with Sir Anthony Fitzherbert and James Denton, Dean of Lichfield, of a successful commission sent to Ireland to deal with the problem of establishing a more centralised government on the Welsh model. All the immediate issues were satisfactorily resolved and he was consequently given the post of Treasurer to Princess Mary and given power and offices in the Welsh Marches.

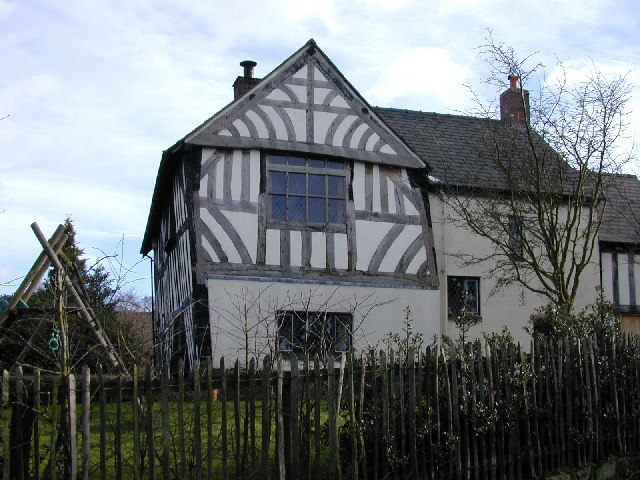
The Chantry House in Bunbury, Cheshire

In his later life he planned the construction of a chapel at St Boniface's Church, Bunbury to house an impressive tomb to receive his body. The chapel (now known as the Ridley or Egerton Chapel) and tomb were built in accordance with his instructions although the tomb was removed in later years. He also left money for a chantry house nearby to provide accommodation for two priests which still stands.

He died in 1528. He had married Margaret Basset of Blore Hall, daughter of Ralph Basset and Ellen Egerton, and was succeeded by their son Richard.
