= Chris Hawthorn =

British Anglican priest (1936–2025)

The Venerable Christopher John Hawthorn (29 April 1936 – 22 February 2025) was a British Anglican priest, who served as Archdeacon of Cleveland from 1991 to 2001.

== Biography ==
Hawthorn was educated at Marlborough College, a Public school (i.e. independent boarding school) in Marlborough, Wiltshire. He studied at Queens' College, Cambridge, graduating with a Bachelor of Arts (BA) degree in 1960, and then trained for ordination at Ripon College Cuddesdon from 1960 to 1962.

He was ordained Deacon in 1962, and Priest. After a curacy at Sutton-on-Hull he held incumbencies at St Nicholas, Hull (1966–1972); Christ Church, Coatham (1972–1979); and St Martin's-on-the-Hill, Scarborough (1979–1991). He was Rural Dean of Scarborough from 1982 to 1991; and a Canon of York from 1987 to 2001 He then served as Archdeacon of Cleveland from 1991 until he retired in 2001.

Hawthorn died on 22 February 2025, at the age of 88.

Church of England titles
Preceded by Ronald Woodley	Archdeacon of Cleveland; 1991–2001	Succeeded by Paul Ferguson
