= James Fall (priest) =

Archdeacon of Cleveland

James Fall was Archdeacon of Cleveland from his installation on 7 December 1700 until his death on 12 June 1711.

Fall was educated at the University of St Andrews and migrated to University of Cambridge in 1698. He was ordained in 1720. He was Canon and Precentor of York from 1691 until his death.

Church of England titles
Preceded by John Burton	Archdeacon of Cleveland; 1700–1711	Succeeded by John Richardson
