= William Palin =

The Venerable William Palin (1893 – 1967) was Archdeacon of Cleveland from 1947 until 1965.

Palin was educated at Hertford College, Oxford; and ordained in 1923. After a curacy at North Ormesby he was Vicar of Thornaby-on-Tees from 1928 to 1938. He was a Chaplain in the RAF from 1936 to 1938; then Vicar of St. John, Middlesbrough from 1938 to 1947 (and Rural Dean of Middlesbrough). He was Rector of Skelton-in-Cleveland with of Upleatham from 1947 to 1965.

He died on 1 May 1967.

Church of England titles
Preceded by George Frederick Townley	Archdeacon of Cleveland; 1947–1965	Succeeded by Stanley Frederick Linsley
