= Stanley Linsley =

The Venerable Stanley Frederick Linsley (born Driffield 19 October 1903; died Sinnington 14 December 1974) was Archdeacon of Cleveland from 1965 until his death.

Linsley was educated at Bridlington School and Lichfield Theological College; and ordained in 1930. He began his career as Curate of Holy Trinity, North Ormesby and in 1932 was promoted to Vicar. In 1937 he left to become Vicar of Tunstall. He was Vicar of Cannock from 1937 to 1943; and then Sambrook until 1951. He was General Director of the Industrial Christian Fellowship and Vicar of St Katherine Cree from 1951 to 1958. He was Vicar and Rural Dean of Kidderminster from 1958 to 1963; and Rector of Thwing with Wold Newton from 1963 until his appointment as Archdeacon. He was an Honorary Chaplain to the Queen from 1964 to 1973.

Church of England titles
Preceded by William Palin	Archdeacon of Cleveland; 1965–1974	Succeeded by John Eliot Southgate
