= Hugh Calveley =

English knight and commander (died 1394)

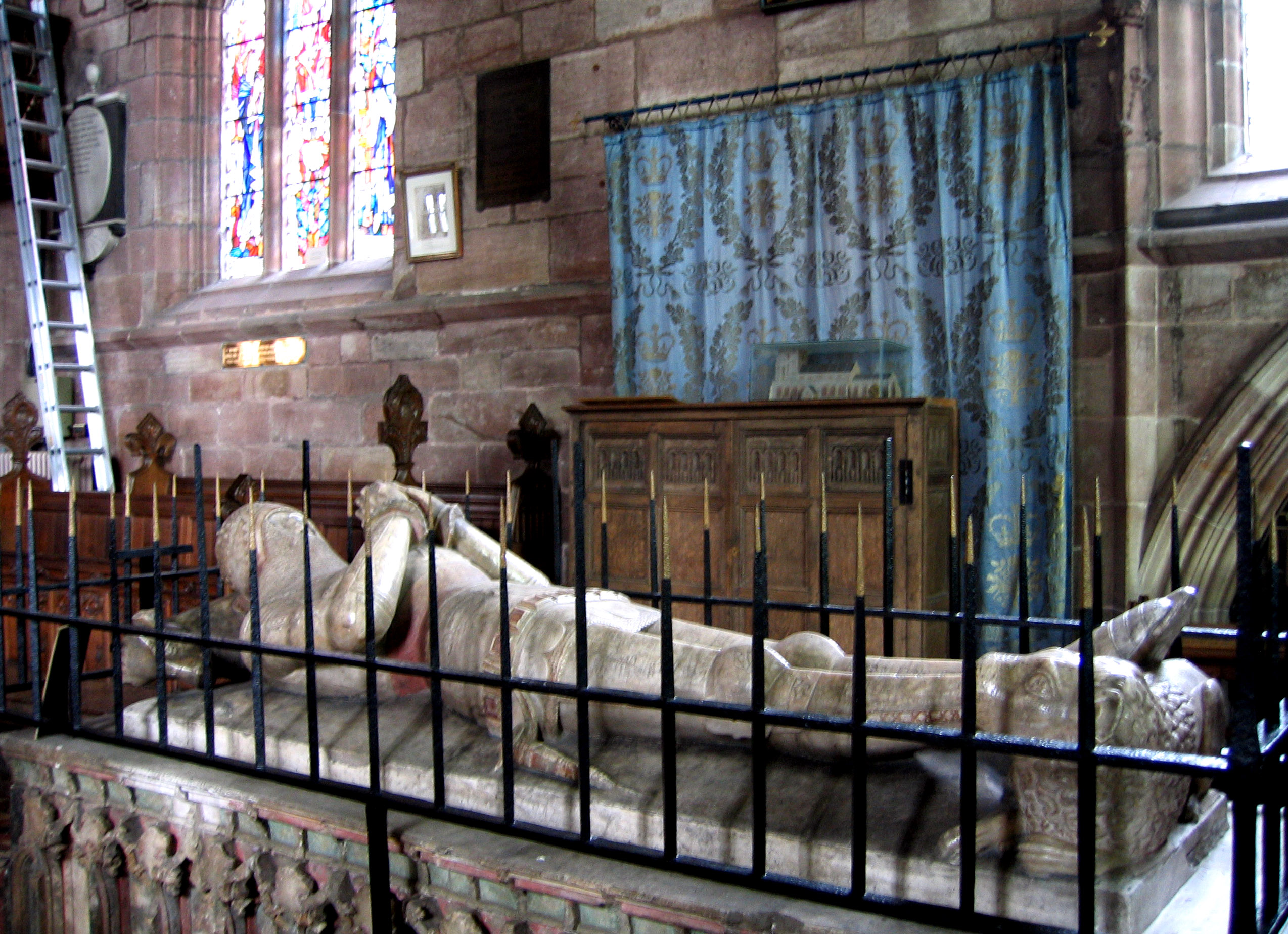
Effigy of Sir Hugh Calveley (d.1394), St Boniface's Church, Bunbury, Cheshire

Modern equestrian statue of Sir Hugh Calveley at Mont Orgueil Castle, Jersey. Atop his helm is the canting crest of Calveley: A calf's head sable crowned argent

Canting arms of Calveley: Argent, a fess gules between three calves passant sable

Sir Hugh Calveley (died 23 April 1394) was an English knight and commander, who took part in the Hundred Years' War, gaining fame during the War of the Breton Succession and the Castilian Civil War. He held various military posts in Brittany and Normandy. He should not be confused with his nephew, also Sir Hugh Calveley, who died in June 1393 and was Member of Parliament for Rutland.

== Background ==
Hugh Calveley was born the youngest son of David de Calveley of Lea, and his wife, Joanna. His name is variously spelled as Calverley, Caverle, Calvelegh, Kerverley, Calverlee, Calvyle, Kalvele, Calviley, and Calvile. The family held the manor of Calveley in Bunbury, Cheshire, living in Calveley Hall. The Hall came into the possession of the Davenport family through marriage in 1369. Hugh was likely born at Lea Hall in Lea Newbold, formerly a civil parish, now in the parish of Aldford and Saighton in the Borough of Cheshire West and Chester. Lea Hall remained in the Calveley Family until 1714 and was demolished in about 1876. Estimates of the year of his birth range from 1315 to 1333. Calveley married an Aragonese princess, the Dna Constanza. The evidence is incontrovertible, as there is a letter of 1377 in existence from Pedro IV on the subject of her dower. How long they cohabited if at all is a moot point but it is known that the princess left Calveley. The date of her departure is unknown, but Pedro wrote to his son Martin in 1381 ordering him to stop living in adultery with her.

It is possible that he was a close relative, maybe even a half-brother, of Sir Robert Knolles.

== Breton civil war ==
Along with many other Englishmen, the young Hugh Calveley served in Brittany, supporting Jean de Montfort's English-backed bid to become Duke of Brittany against the French-backed claimant, Charles de Blois, during the Breton War of Succession.

An anonymous Breton poet's account of the Battle of the Thirty in 1351 has "Hue de Caverle" as a knight fighting on the English side (where he was defeated, captured, to be ransomed later). One estimate of the date of his knighthood is 1346, though documents from 1354 do not refer to him as a knight, and there is some evidence that he was not knighted until 1361.

In 1354, Calveley was captain of the English-held fortress of Becherel. He planned a raid on the castle of Montmuran on 10 April, to capture Arnoul d'Audrehem, Marshal of France, who was a guest of the lady of Tinteniac. Bertrand du Guesclin, in one of the early highlights of his career, anticipated the attack, posting archers as sentries. When the sentries raised the alarm at Calveley's approach, both du Guesclin and d'Audrehem hurried to intercept. In the ensuing fight, Calveley was unhorsed by a knight named Enguerrand d'Hesdin, captured, and later ransomed.

In 1359 Sir Robert Knolles and Calveley invaded the Rhône Valley. The city of Le Puy fell to them in July. The campaign ended when their way to Avignon was barred by the army of Thomas de la Marche, Deputy for Louis II, Duke of Bourbon, at which point both English commanders retreated.

According to Fowler, Calverley captured Du Guesclin on the bridge of Juigné-sur-Sarthe in 1360.

According to de Launay, in 1362, Calverley captured Du Guesclin during an attack on Juvigné. This time the ransom was 30,000 écus. (Two years later, a similar incident cost the unfortunate French nobleman one thousand pounds.)

At the Battle of Auray on 29 September 1364, Calveley had the command of the reserve division of the forces of Jean de Montfort, under the command of Sir John Chandos. Charles de Blois was killed at Auray, enabling Jean de Montfort to claim the Duchy without further conflict.

== The Iberian Campaigns ==
After the conclusion of the Breton civil war, Calveley, along with many other soldiers, found himself unemployed. These soldiers, banding together in the Free Companies, continued to support themselves by raiding widely, causing a huge problem for the Kingdom of France.

The solution was found when Aragon, France and the Papacy agreed to provide money to pay for the Free Companies to wage a campaign to support Count Enrique of Trastamara's bid for the throne of Castile, which at the time was held by Enrique's half-brother, Pedro of Castile. Calveley signed up as the most prominent of the English captains on this campaign, in which he was involved from 1365 to 1367, ironically serving alongside Bertrand du Guesclin, his once and future enemy. For his services to Enrique, he was made Count of Carrion. He married one of the Aragonese queen's ladies-in-waiting, named Constanza de Candia, a princess of Aragonese Castle and daughter of a Sicilian baron.

Pedro the Cruel, having fled from Castile, invoked his alliance with England. Calveley was ordered back to the service of England by the Black Prince, and now took a prominent part in Pedro's counter-campaign, culminating in the decisive Battle of Nájera. At Nájera, Calveley was once again in the rearguard, sharing command with Count Jean I of Armagnac. The two commanders had the glory of delivering the final blow to the faltering enemy infantry by a cavalry charge. Enrique of Trastamara escaped from the battle. Though his title as Count of Carrion had been granted by Enrique, Pedro confirmed it upon reclaiming the Castilian throne. Once again, Du Gesclin, who now referred to Hugh as 'my dear brother,' was captured by Thomas Cheyne and William de Berland for the Black Prince.

In the spring of 1367, the Black Prince sent Calveley as an emissary to Aragon, to arrange the diplomatic isolation of the fugitive Enrique. Calveley successfully convinced Pedro the Ceremonious to renounce his support for Enrique.

== Resumed war with France ==
When hostilities resumed between England and France in 1369, Calveley was once again involved, first in raiding the possessions of Gascon nobles who had defected to the French. He took part in at least three further campaigns in the period to 1374; notably, he was one of the joint commanders of the English army disastrously defeated by Bertrand du Guesclin at the Battle of Pontvallain, 4 December 1370, though he managed to escape.

From 1375 to 1378, Calveley was governor of Calais, an important port. Thereafter, he became one of the two Admirals of the English fleet, taking part in several sea battles. He is also made Warden of the Isles in 1376, tasked with strengthening the military defences in the Channel Islands, notably at Mont Orgueil Castle and Castle Cornet, from regular French raids.

In July 1379, he was involved in a raid on Brittany led by Sir John Arundel, Marshal of England. On their return voyage, 20 ships and about 1000 men were lost at sea in a storm. Calveley was one of only 8 survivors.

In 1383, he took part in the Norwich Crusade, preached by the Roman pope against his rival at Avignon, but this campaign turned into an embarrassing failure when France bribed a large number of the participants.

== Late career ==
Calveley's final military engagement was in 1386, when he joined John of Gaunt in an unsuccessful campaign to secure the Castilian throne.

In July 1388, he joined the English Peace Commissioners negotiating a truce with France. In his later life, he also served as a Justice of the Peace for Berkshire.

== Death and burial ==
Calveley died without male issue on St George's Day, 23 April 1394 (though some sources list his date of death as 1393). His tomb effigy is in St Boniface's church in Bunbury, Cheshire, though there is some doubt as to whether he was in fact buried there. The effigy was likely commissioned by Sir Robert Knolles.
