= Haycroft, Cheshire =

Deserted village in Spurstow, Cheshire, England

Coordinates: 53°06′40″N 2°40′05″W

Haycroft is a deserted village in the civil parish of Spurstow, in Cheshire, England, located at SJ5553157178, immediately east of Haycroft farm. Aerial photography has shown evidence of a medieval village and a field system. The site is a scheduled monument.

== Description ==
The earthworks are located a little to the north west of the present village of Spurstow, which is believed to have subsequently contracted or moved. They lie in a valley, which formerly contained a stream. There are six house platforms which are 25–40 metres^{2} in area, each of which is surrounded by a 2-metre ditch. To the north side of the platforms and abutting them there is evidence of medieval ridge and furrow ploughing. A later causeway runs north–south, bisecting the site. The existing lane to Haycroft farm represents part of an old road from Ridley Green to Beeston.

== See also ==
- List of scheduled monuments in Cheshire (1066–1539)
- History of Cheshire
- History of agriculture in Cheshire
