= Robert Peirson (priest) =

The Venerable Robert Peirson was Archdeacon of Cleveland from 22 August 1787 to his death om 4 November 1805.

Pierson was educated at Jesus College, Cambridge. He was the Incumbent at Husthwaite.

Church of England titles
Preceded by Francis Blackburne	Archdeacon of Cleveland; 1787–1805	Succeeded by Charles Baillie-Hamilton
