= Alan Richardson (priest) =

British Anglican priest and academic

The Very Reverend Alan Richardson KBE
- Dean of York
- Church: Church of England
- Diocese: Diocese of York
- Predecessor: Eric Milner-White
- Successor: Ronald Jasper

Orders
- Ordination: 1928

Personal details
- Born: 1905 Wigan, Lancashire
- Died: 1975 (aged 69–70)
- Denomination: Anglicanism
- Education: University of Liverpool; Exeter College, Oxford; Ridley Hall, Cambridge

Alan Richardson, KBE (1905–1975) was a British Anglican priest and academic. From 1964 to 1975, he served as Dean of York.

== Early life and education ==
Richardson was educated at Liverpool University, Exeter College, Oxford and Ridley Hall, Cambridge.

== Ordained ministry ==
Ordained in 1928 his first post was as a curate at St Saviour's Liverpool. He was Vicar of Cambo and then Secretary of the Student Christian Movement. Later he was a canon of Durham Cathedral then Professor of Christian Theology at the University of Nottingham from 1953 until 1964 when he accepted the position as Dean of York, a post he held until his death.

== Selected works ==
Richardson published extensively. Among his books were:

- Creeds in the Making (1935), reprint 1980
- The Redemption of Modernism (1935)
- History and the Kingdom of God (1939)
- The Miracle Stories of the Gospels (1941)
- Christian Apologetics (1947)
- A Theological Word Book of the Bible (editor) (1950)
- The Gospel And Modern Thought (1950)
- The Teacher's Commentary, revised edition, (co-editor) (1955), published in North America by Harper & Bros. as The Twentieth Century Bible Commentary
- An Introduction to the Theology of the New Testament (1958) revised 1972 (ISBN 978-0334007098)
- History, sacred and profane, 1962 Bampton Lectures (1964)
- A Dictionary of Christian Theology (1969), revised by John Bowden (1983) (ISBN 978-0664227487)
- The Political Christ (1973)

== Styles ==
- Mr Alan Richardson (1905–1928)
- The Revd Alan Richardson (1928–1943)
- The Revd Canon Alan Richardson (1943–1953)
- The Revd Professor Alan Richardson (1953–1964)
- The Very Revd Alan Richardson (1964–1975)
