= Keith Jones (priest) =

English priest (born 1944)

The Very Reverend Keith Jones
- Dean of York
- Church: Church of England
- Diocese: Diocese of York
- In office: 2004 to 2012
- Predecessor: Raymond Furnell
- Successor: Vivienne Faull
- Other post: Dean of Exeter (1996 to 2004)

Orders
- Ordination: 1969 (deacon); 1970 (priest)

Personal details
- Born: 27 June 1944 (age 82)
- Denomination: Anglican
- Spouse: Viola Mary Jenkyns
- Children: 3 daughters
- Education: Selwyn College, Cambridge

Keith Brynmor Jones (born 27 June 1944) is a retired Church of England priest. He was the Dean of Exeter from 1996 to 2004, and the Dean of York from 2004 until his retirement in 2012.

== Early life and education ==
Jones was born on 27 June 1944 in Shrewsbury, England. He received his secondary education at Ludlow Grammar School in Shropshire. He studied English literature at Selwyn College, Cambridge, graduating with a Bachelor of Arts (BA) degree in 1965: as per tradition, his BA was promoted to a Master of Arts (MA Cantab) degree. From 1967 to 1969, he trained for holy Orders and studied theology at Cuddesdon College, an Anglo-Catholic theological college near Oxford.

== Ordained ministry ==
Jones was ordained at Southwark Cathedral and served a curacy in the parish of Limpsfield with Titsey, Surrey. In 1982 he was appointed vicar of St Mary-le-Tower, Ipswich in 1982, a position he held until 1995. He served his first cathedral position as Priest-Vicar at St Albans Cathedral and was appointed the Rural Dean of Ipswich in 1992. He was an Honorary Canon of St Edmundsbury Cathedral between 1993 and 1995.

He was appointed Dean of Exeter in 1996. He was installed as Dean of York in June 2004. He retired from full-time ministry on 30 April 2012. In 2013, he was granted permission to officiate in the Diocese of St Edmundsbury and Ipswich. Since retirement he has served as an Associate Minister, at St Margaret's Church, Ipswich.

== Other appointments ==
- Member, General Synod (1999–present)
- Chairman, Pilgrims' Association
- Member, Places of Worship Panel, English Heritage

== Personal life ==
Jones is married to Viola Jones, a lecturer in Christianity and art, with whom he has three daughters: Sophie, Olivia and Isabel.

== Styles ==
- Mr Keith Jones (1944–1969)
- The Revd Keith Jones (1969–1993)
- The Revd Canon Keith Jones (1993–1995)
- The Very Revd Keith Jones (1996–present)
