= Ron Woodley =

Archdeacon of Cleveland

Ronald John (Ron) Woodley (born Edmonton, London 28 December 1925 - 25 February 2017) was Archdeacon of Cleveland from 1985 to 1991.

Woodley was educated at St Augustine's College, Canterbury and Bishops' College, Cheshunt. He was ordained Deacon in 1953, and Priest in 1954. After curacies in Middlesbrough and Whitby he was Vicar of The Ascension, Middlesbrough from 1966 to 1971; then Rector of Stokesley from 1971 to 1985. He was Canon of York from 1982 to 2000.

Church of England titles
Preceded by John Southgate	Archdeacon of Cleveland; 1991–2001	Succeeded by Chris Hawthorn
