= Ronald Jasper =

British Anglican priest (1917–1990)

Ronald Claud Dudley Jasper CBE (17 August 1917 – 11 April 1990) was a British Anglican priest who was Dean of York between 1975 and 1984.

Born on 17 August 1917, he was educated at Plymouth College and the University of Leeds. He was ordained after studying at the College of the Resurrection in 1940. He held curacies in Ryhope, Durham and Esh before being appointed Chaplain of University College, Durham. He was vicar of Stillington from 1948 to 1955 and succentor of Exeter Cathedral until 1960. He was then a lecturer in liturgical studies at King's College London. In 1968 he was appointed a canon of Westminster Abbey and in 1974 Archdeacon of Westminster, his last appointment before becoming Dean of York. He was dean at the time of the fire at York Minster in 1984.

An eminent author, he died on 11 April 1990. He was married to Betty, who died in 2013. They had a son and a daughter. The son is the theologian David Jasper. The daughter, Christine, is married to Nicholas Reade, Bishop of Blackburn (2004–12).

== Books ==
- Prayer Book Revision in England, 1800–1900, 1954.
- George Bell: Bishop of Chichester, 1967.
- A Christian’s Prayer Book, The Daily Office Revised, 1978.
- The Development of the Anglican Liturgy 1662–1980.
- Language and the Worship of the Church
- With Paul F. Bradshaw, A Companion to the Alternative Service Book, SPCK, 1986.

Church of England titles
| Preceded by Alan Richardson | Dean of York; 1975–1984 | Succeeded by John Eliot Southgate |
