= Richard Langridge (priest) =

English Anglican priest

Richard Langridge, D.D. was an English Anglican priest in the 16th century.

Lever was educated at Merton College, Oxford. He held livings in Colchester, Barkway and Wheldrake. Langridge was Archdeacon of Cleveland from 1534 until his death in 1547.
