= Archdeacon of Cleveland =

Ecclesiastical officer in the Anglican Diocese of York

The Archdeacon of Cleveland is a senior ecclesiastical officer of an archdeaconry, or subdivision, of the Church of England diocese and province of York. The Archdeaconry of Cleveland stretches west from Thirsk, north to Middlesbrough, east to Whitby and south to Pickering. It has a varied geography, including the southern parts of the conurbation of Teesside and the open moors of the North York Moors National Park.

== History ==
Archdeacons occurred in the Diocese of York before 1093; before 1128, there were five serving simultaneously – probably each in their own area, but none occurs with a territorial title before 1133. The title Archdeacon of Cleveland is first recorded before 1174 with Ralph, Archdeacon of Cleveland. Of the five archdeaconries, Cleveland is one of three which has never split from York diocese.

== People ==
The archdeaconry is led by the area Bishop of Whitby, Barry Hill and by the Archdeacon of Cleveland, Amanda Bloor since 15 June 2020.

== Organisation ==
In common with other archdeaconries, Cleveland is further subdivided into deaneries:

- Guisborough
- Middlesbrough
- Mowbray
- Northern Ryedale
- Stokesley
- Whitby

== List of archdeacons ==
Some archdeacons without territorial titles are recorded from around the time of Thomas of Bayeux; see Archdeacon of York.

=== High Medieval ===
- bef. 1128–aft. 1137: Hugh the Chanter (Note: Hugh does not occur with the title Archdeacon of Cleveland; rather his territory can be deduced.)
- bef. 1139–aft. 1154: Ralph de Baro
- bef. 1159–bef. 1171 (res.): John son of Letold (afterwards Archdeacon of Nottingham)
- bef. 1173–aft. 1174: Ralph (disputed; possibly vice-archdeacon)
- bef. 1171–1189 (d.): Jeremy
- July 1189–c. 1198 (res.): Geoffrey de Muschamp
- bef. 1200–bef. 1200 (res.): John de Gray (Archdeacon of Gloucester at same or similar time)
- March 1201–aft. 1209: Ralph de Kyme (archbishop's appointment)
- March–September 1201: Hugh Murdac (unsuccessful canons' appointment)
- aft. 1213–bef. 1223: William of Ely
- bef. 1225–aft. 1229: Matthew Scot
- bef. 1230–aft. 1238: Serlo (possibly the same-named Dean of Exeter)
- bef. 1233–aft. 1233: Walter de Taney, Archdeacon of the East Riding (acting)
- bef. 1246–bef. 1262: John de Langeton the elder
- Roger (disputed)
- bef. 1264–aft. 1278: Rufinus of Tonengo
- 2 May 1281–aft. 1286: Thomas de Grimston
- 17 July 1289 – 12 August 1317 (d.): Stephen de Mauley

=== Late Medieval ===
- 4 February 1318–bef. 1334 (res.): Adrian de Fieschi
- 28 October 1334 – 20 September 1348 (exch.): Innocent de Fieschi
- August 1343 & August 1344: William de Weston (ineffective royal grants)
- 20 September 1348–bef. 1351 (d.): John Ellerker
- 26 September 1351 – 5 March 1355 (exch.): Thomas de Holwell
- 5 March 1355 – 21 September 1379 (d.): William de Ferriby
- 23 September 1379–bef. 1379: William de Catton
- 7–9 November 1379 (exch.): William Kexby
- 9 November 1379–bef. 1380: Roger de Ripon
- 1380–14 January 1381 (exch.): Robert de Manfeld
- 14 January 1381 – 2 April 1385 (exch.): Adam Spencer
- 2 April 1385–bef. 1387 (d.): John Marshall
- 6 March–bef. 11 June 1387 (d.): John Fitzthomas
- 11 June 1387–bef. 1391: Alexander Herle
- bef. 1391–August 1410 (d.): Thomas Walkington
- 31 August 1410 – 28 May 1411 (res.): Clement Stanton
- 9 March 1411–bef. 1414 (res.): Richard Pittes (royal grant)
- 10 June 1414 – 1434 (d.): William Pelleson
- September 1434 – 1453 (d.): William Duffield
- 18 August 1453–bef. 1457 (d.): Stephen Wilton
- 12 August 1457 – 1470 (res.): William Brande
- September 1470 – 1485 (res.): William Poteman
- 13 January 1485 – 1485 (d.): William Constable
- 11 October 1485 – 1493 (res.): Henry Carnebull
- 30 April 1493 – 1497 (res.): Geoffrey Blythe
- March–May 1497 (res.): John Hole
- May 1497 – 1499 (res.): Thomas Crossley
- 18 August 1499–bef. 1506 (d.): John Reynald
- 13 June 1507 – 1523 (res.): Richard Rawlins
- December 1523–bef. 1533 (d.): James Denton
- June 1533 – 1533 (exch.): Thomas Bedyll
- August 1533 – 1534 (res.): William Clyff
- 7 October 1534–bef. 1547 (d.): Richard Langridge

=== Early modern ===
- 9 July 1547–bef. 1564 (res.): John Warner (also Dean of Winchester from 1559)
- 31 March 1564 – 24 March 1570 (d.): Christopher Malton
- 11 April 1570 – 8 May 1582 (d.): Ralph Coulton
- 8 June 1582 – 1589 (res.): Richard Remington (afterwards Archdeacon of the East Riding)
- 10 March 1589 – 19 April 1601 (res.): Richard Byrde
- 20 April 1601 – 1619 (res.): John Phillips (also Bishop of Sodor and Man from 1605)
- August 1619–30 September 1635 (res.): Henry Thurscross
- 1 October 1635 – 15 October 1638 (res.): Timothy Thurscross
- 24 October 1638 – 1675 (d.): John Neale
- 27 April 1675 – 9 September 1680 (d.): Robert Feild
- 9 October 1680 – 1682 (res.): John Lake
- 5 January 1683 – 1685 (d.): Barnabas Long
- 23 July 1685 – 24 November 1700 (d.): John Burton
- 7 December 1700 – 12 June 1711 (d.): James Fall
- 3 August 1711 – 28 October 1735 (d.): John Richardson
- 17 November 1735 – 1750 (res.): Jaques Sterne (afterwards Archdeacon of the East Riding)
- 18 July 1750 – 7 August 1787 (d.): Francis Blackburne
- 22 August 1787 – 4 November 1805 (d.): Robert Peirson
- 15 January 1806 – 19 June 1820 (d.): Charles Baillie-Hamilton
- 28 June 1820 – 1828 (res.): Francis Wrangham
- 3 December 1828 – 27 October 1832 (res.): Leveson Venables-Vernon-Harcourt
- 2 November 1832 – 24 December 1845 (d.): Henry Todd
- 17 January 1846 – 17 January 1874 (res.): Edward Churton

=== Late modern ===
- bef. 1875–1882 (d.): William Hey
- 1883 – 30 March 1897 (d.): Henry Yeoman
- 1897–1906 (res.): William Hutchings
- 1907–1938 (ret.): Thomas Lindsay (afterward archdeacon emeritus)
- 1938–1942 (d.): Basil Carter
- 1942–1946: Edmund Hope
- 1947–1947 (res.): George Townley
- 1947–1965 (ret.): William Palin (afterward archdeacon emeritus)
- 1965–1974 (ret.): Stanley Linsley (afterward archdeacon emeritus)
- 1974–1984 (res.): John Southgate
- 1985–1991 (ret.): Ron Woodley (afterward archdeacon emeritus)
- 1991–2001 (ret.): Chris Hawthorn (afterward archdeacon emeritus)
- 2001 – 3 July 2014: Paul Ferguson
- 12 June 2014 – 2015 (Acting): Richard Rowling
- 6 May 2015 – 9 October 2019: Sam Rushton (became Archdeacon of York)
- 9 October 2019 – 15 June 2020: Clay Roundtree, Acting Archdeacon
- 15 June 2020 – present: Amanda Bloor

== Sources ==
- Greenaway, Diana E. (1999), Fasti Ecclesiae Anglicanae 1066–1300, vol. 6, pp. 36–40
- Horn, Joyce M.; Smith, David M. (1979), Fasti Ecclesiae Anglicanae 1541–1857, vol. 5, pp. 14–16
- Jones, B. (1963), Fasti Ecclesiae Anglicanae 1300–1541, vol. 6, pp. 19–21
