= Charles Baillie-Hamilton (priest) =

English Anglican priest

The Venerable Charles Baillie-Hamilton (27 November 1764 – 19 June 1820) was an English Anglican priest. He was Archdeacon of Cleveland from 1806 until 1820.

Bailie-Hamilton was educated at Pembroke College, Cambridge. He was ordained deacon on 11 October 1789, and priest on 10 October 1790. He held livings at Colton, Lofthouse, Stainton and Middleton-in-Teesdale.

Church of England titles
Preceded by Robert Peirson	Archdeacon of Cleveland; 1806–1820	Succeeded by Francis Wrangham
