= Robert Feild =

English Anglican cleric

Robert Feild was Archdeacon of Cleveland from 1675 until his death on 9 September 1680.

Feild was educated at Trinity College, Oxford. He became a Prebendary of York in 1670; Rector of Barton in Fabis in 1671; and a Canon of Southwell in 1676.

He was buried at York Minster.
