= Leveson Venables-Vernon-Harcourt =

The Venerable Leveson Venables-Vernon-Harcourt (b 20 March 1788 – 26 July 1860) was Archdeacon of Cleveland from 3 December 1828 until 27 October 1832.

He was the son of Edward Venables-Vernon-Harcourt, born at Sudbury, Derbyshire. He matriculated at Christ Church, Oxford in 1806, graduating B.A. in 1810, and M.A. 1813. He was for many years Chancellor of the Diocese of York.

Church of England titles
Preceded by Francis Wrangham	Archdeacon of Cleveland; 1828–1832	Succeeded by Henry Todd
