= Bunbury Aldersey School =

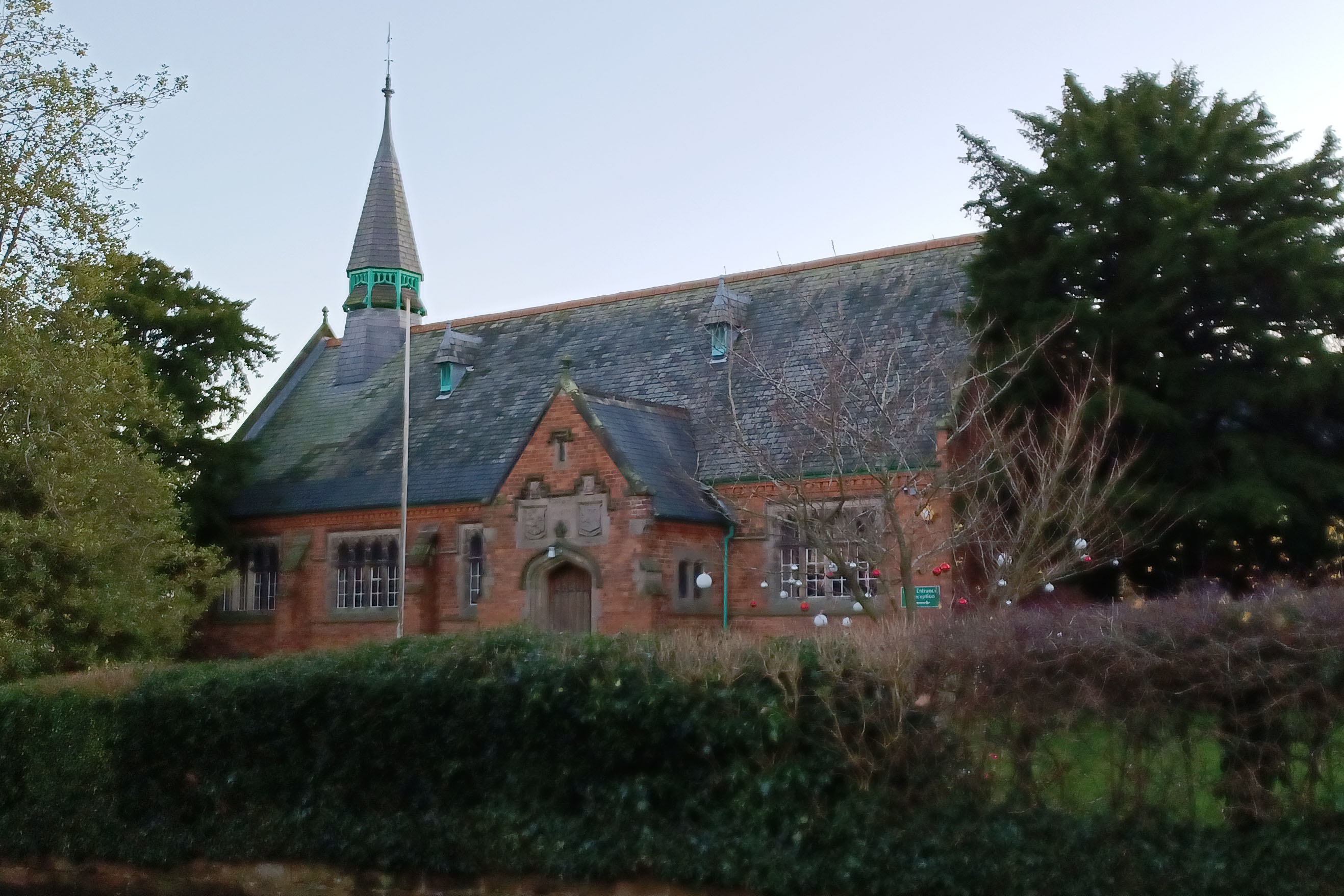
- Coat of arms of the Haberdashers' Company

Location
- School Lane, Bunbury; Cheshire, CW6 9NR; England
- Coordinates: 53.1172°N 2.6556°W

Information
- Type: Academy
- Motto: In unity we learn and play in the loving hands of God
- Religious affiliation: Church of England
- Local authority: Cheshire East Council
- Oversight: Diocese of Chester
- Trust: Rural Church Schools Academy Trust
- Department for Education URN: 143155 Tables
- Ofsted: Reports
- Principal: Nic Badger
- Gender: Mixed
- Age range: 5–11
- Enrolment: 161 (2018)
- Capacity: 210
- Website: www.bunburyaldersey.cheshire.sch.uk
- Built: 1874
- Architect: John Douglas
- Architectural style: Gothic Revival

National Heritage List for England
- Type: Listed Building – Grade II
- Designated: 3 August 1974
- Reference no.: 1136159

Bunbury Aldersey School is a 5–11 mixed, Church of England primary school with academy status in Bunbury, Cheshire, England. It is located in the Diocese of Chester and recorded in the National Heritage List for England as a designated Grade II listed building.. The Worshipful Company of Haberdashers is a sponsor of the school.

== History ==
The school was built in 1874 and designed by the Chester architect John Douglas. It was built as a grammar school to replace a school nearer to Bunbury Church, which had been founded in 1594 by haberdasher Thomas Aldersey. It later became a primary school.

== Architecture ==
The school is constructed in red brick on a sandstone plinth and has a slate roof. Its style is Gothic Revival, and it is built in one storey with five bays. The entrance bay projects forwards and its opening has a Tudor arch, over which is the date 1874 and shields containing inscriptions. Above this is a gable with a finial. On the roof are lucarnes and an octagonal slate turret.

== See also ==
- Listed buildings in Bunbury, Cheshire
- List of non-ecclesiastical and non-residential works by John Douglas
