= William Hey (priest) =

The Venerable William Hey was Archdeacon of Cleveland from 1875 until his death on 22 November 1882.

Hey was born at Ockbrook in 1811; educated at Sherborne School and St John's College, Cambridge; and ordained in 1838. He was headmaster of St Peter's School, York from 1839 to 1864 when he became a Canon Residentiary at York Minster. He was member of the Yorkshire Philosophical Society for over forty years, serving on its council from 1841 subsequently as a vice-president until his death. He served for many years as the Honorary Curator of Insects & Crustacea at the Yorkshire Museum and was succeeded in this post by his son Rev W.C. Hey.

Church of England titles
Preceded by Edward Churton	Archdeacon of Cleveland; 1875–1882	Succeeded by Henry Yeoman
