= St Boniface's Church, Bunbury =

Coordinates: 53.1182°N 2.6453°W

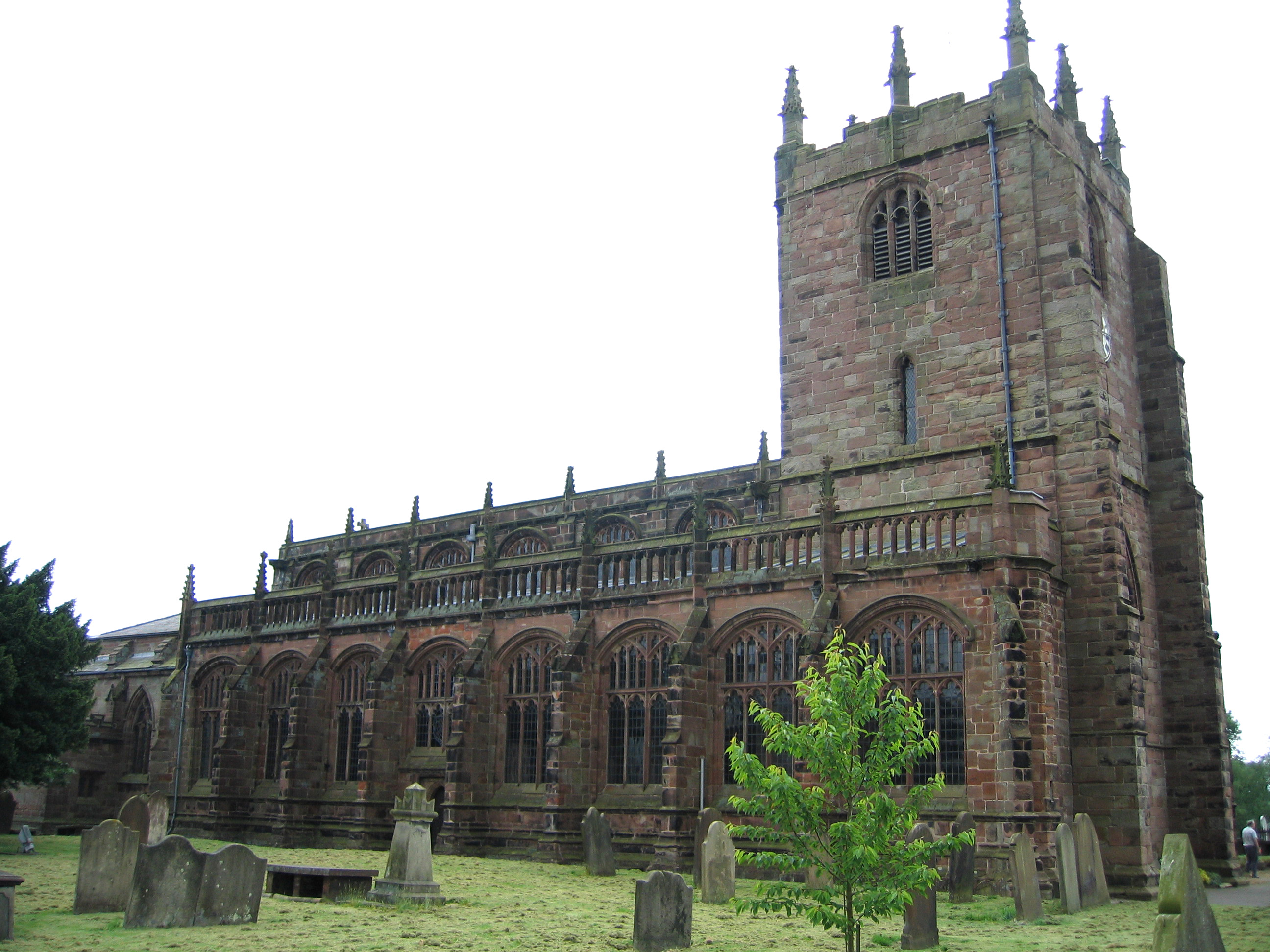
- St Boniface's Church, Bunbury, from the northwest

- Location in Cheshire
- OS grid reference: SJ 568 581
- Location: Bunbury, Cheshire
- Country: England
- Denomination: Anglican
- Website: St Boniface, Bunbury

History
- Status: Parish church
- Dedication: Saint Boniface

Architecture
- Functional status: Active
- Heritage designation: Grade I
- Designated: 12 January 1967
- Architect(s): Pennington and Bridgen
- Architectural type: Church
- Style: Gothic
- Completed: 1866

Specifications
- Length: 160 feet (49 m)
- Width: 42.5 feet (13 m)
- Materials: Red sandstone, lead and slate roof

Administration
- Province: York
- Diocese: Chester
- Archdeaconry: Chester
- Deanery: Malpas
- Parish: Bunbury

Clergy
- Vicar: Revd Tim Hayward

St Boniface's Church stands prominently in the village of Bunbury, Cheshire, England. It is recorded in the National Heritage List for England as a designated Grade I listed building. The church dates mainly from the 14th century. Its features include the Ridley chapel, the alabaster chest tomb of Sir Hugh Calveley and the tomb of Sir George Beeston. Raymond Richards, author of Old Cheshire Churches, considers it is architecturally one of the most important examples of its period in Cheshire. Alec Clifton-Taylor includes it in his list of 'best' English parish churches, and Simon Jenkins assigns it two stars in his book England's Thousand Best Churches. It is an active Anglican parish church in the diocese of Chester, the archdeaconry of Chester and the deanery of Malpas. Its benefice is combined with that of St Jude, Tilstone Fearnall.

== History ==
From the 8th century a church has been on the site, initially a wooden Anglo-Saxon church. By 1135 a stone Norman church was present. The church was rebuilt in the decorated style in 1320. In 1385–86 Sir Hugh Calveley endowed it as a collegiate church, which resulted in more rebuilding: much of the existing structure dates from this time. A chantry chapel was added in 1527 by Sir Rauph Egerton of Ridley. After the dissolution of the chantries and collegiate churches in 1547, Thomas Aldersey acquired the church's tithes and advowson, and he endowed a preacher and a curate in Bunbury. He donated the tithes and advowson to the Worshipful Company of Haberdashers, who followed his wishes in appointing Puritan ministers who later included William Hinde.

Nave galleries were added in the 18th century. From 1863 to 1866, restoration work was done by Pennington and Bridgen, when wall paintings, galleries, and box pews were removed, the floor was tiled, and a new roof was constructed. In 1940 a land mine seriously damaged the church. The roof was replaced in 1950 by Marshall Sisson.

== Architecture ==
=== Exterior ===
The church, built in red sandstone with a lead and slate roof, is mainly Perpendicular in style. At the west end a tower leads to a broad six-bay nave and narrow eight-bay north and south aisles which enclose the tower. The three-bay chancel is narrower than the nave and leads to a sanctuary with a vestry to the north. To the south of the chancel is the Ridley chapel. A south porch extends from the fifth bay from the west. The tower has a west doorway above which is a three-light window. The ringers' windows are single lancets, and the belfry windows are of four lights. The top of the tower is surmounted by battlements and pinnacles. The parapet of the north aisle consists of stone openwork with crocketed pinnacles; the parapet of the south aisle is crenellated.

=== Interior ===
Fragments of wall paintings remain inside the church. The octagonal stone font is dated 1662 and the oak communion rail dates from 1717. The choir stalls are of carved oak, as is the pulpit, which rests on a stone base. The brass chandelier in Baroque style is dated 1756. The chancel screen is by F. H. Crossley and is dated 1921. The stone screen to the Ridley chapel, a chantry chapel constructed in 1527 on the instructions of Sir Ralph (Raufe) Egerton of Ridley, is "the only substantial painted medieval screen to survive in Cheshire". Twelve painted figures also survive from a former parclose screen of around 1450, which include Saint Catherine, Saint Apollonia, and Saint Anthony of Egypt; they were restored in 1988 and are currently mounted along the south wall. In several windows there are fragments of original stained glass. Windows by Kempe dated 1905 are in the south chancel wall, and in the north chancel wall are windows dated 1952 by R. C. Evetts. The glass in the east and west windows and in the east window of the north aisle is by Christopher Webb of St Albans.

=== Monuments ===
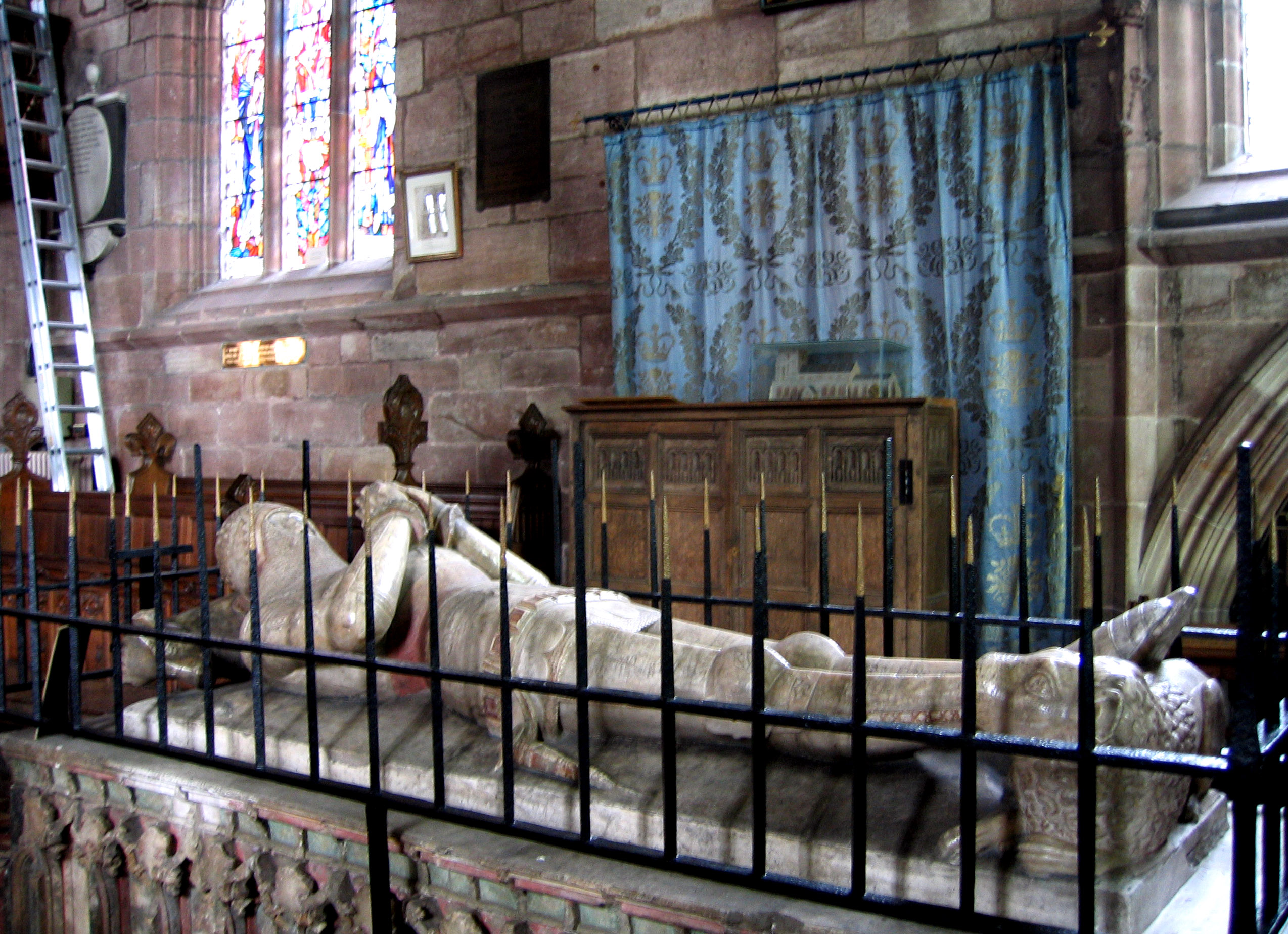
Tomb of Sir Hugh Calveley

==== Sir Hugh Calveley (d.1394) ====
Sir Hugh Calveley (died 23 April 1394) was an English knight and commander, who took part in the Hundred Years' War, gaining fame during the War of the Breton Succession and the Castilian Civil War. He held various military posts in Brittany and Normandy. He founded the college of which St Boniface was the collegiate church, in the 1380s. His alabaster tomb and effigy is in the centre of the chancel and is enclosed within contemporary ironwork, though there is some doubt as to whether he was in fact buried there. The niches in the sarcophagus originally contained weepers (small figures of mourners). The effigy was likely commissioned by Sir Robert Knolles.

==== Sir George Beeston (d.1601) ====
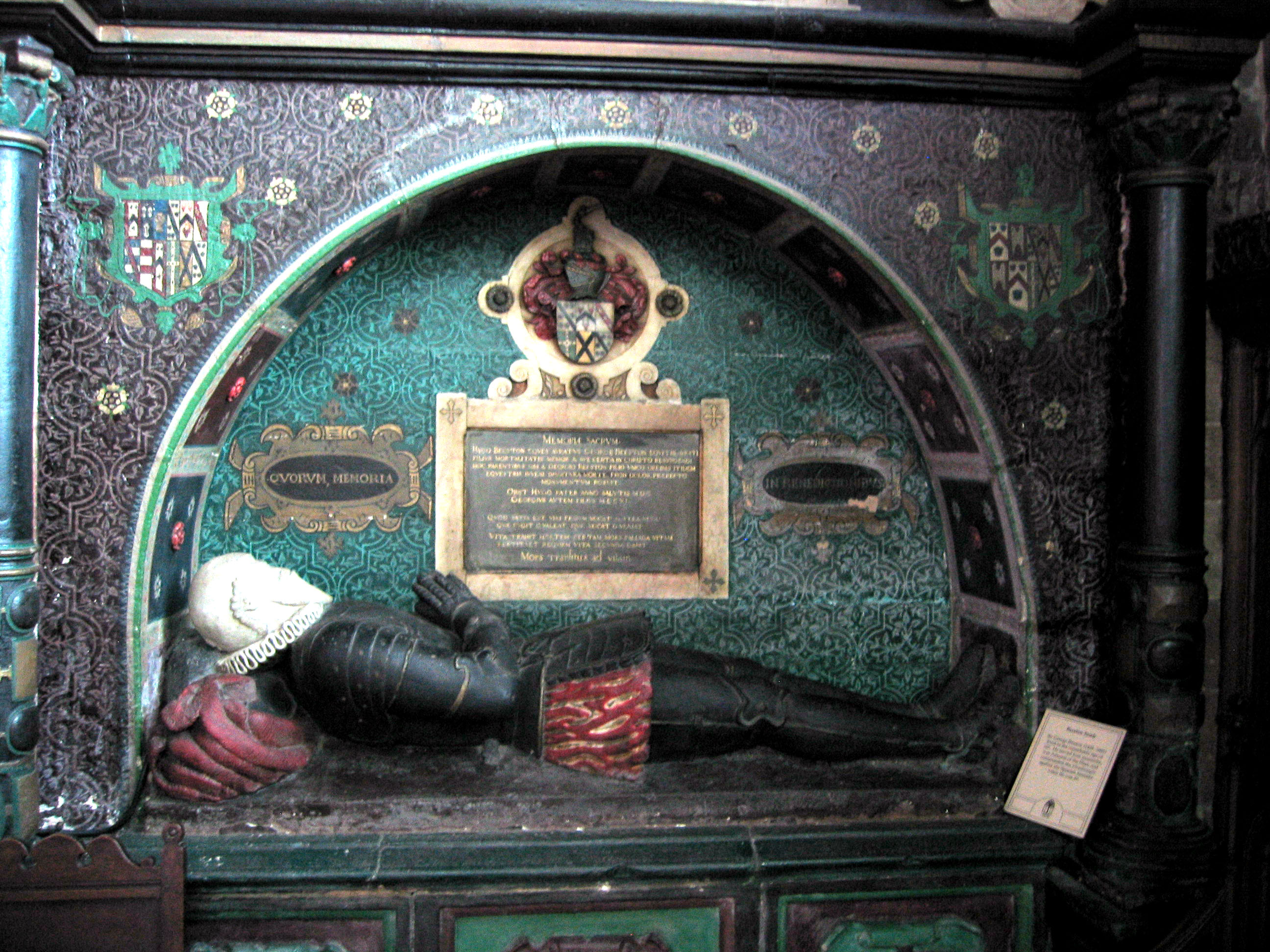
Tomb of Sir George Beeston

In the north wall of the sanctuary is the tomb of Sir George Beeston who was the commander of Dreadnought when it fought against the Spanish Armada. At this time he was reputedly aged 89, and his memorial states he died at the age of 102. The Latin inscription is as follows, translated into English:

"Here lies buried George Beeston, knight, a promoter of valour and truth; having been brought up from his youth in the arts of war he was chosen one of his company of pensioners by the invincible King Henry the Eighth, when he besieged Boulogne [1544]; he merited [the same] under Edward the Sixth in the battle against the Scots at Musselburgh [1547]. Afterwards under the same King, under Mary, and under Elizabeth, in the naval engagements as captain or vice-captain of the fleet, by whom, after that most mighty Spanish fleet of 1588, had been vanquished, he was honoured with the order of knighthood; and now, his years pressing heavily on him, when he had admirably approved his integrity to princes, and his bravery to his adversaries, acceptable to God, and dear to good men, and long expecting Christ, in the year 1601 and in the ... of his age, he fell asleep in Him, so that he may rise again in Him with joy. And together with him rests a most beloved wife, Alice, daughter of [Thomas] Davenport of Henbury, esquire, a matron most holy, chaste, and liberal to the poor, who, when she had lived in matrimony 66 years, and had borne to her husband three sons, John, Hugh, and Hugh, and as many daughters, Ann, Jane, and Dorothy, passed into the heavenly country in the year 1591 and in the [refer below] year of her age, with Christ for ever to live. The dutifulness of their son Hugh Beeston, esquire, the younger, Receiver General of all the revenues of the Crown as well as in the county palatine of Chester as in the counties of North Wales, set up this monument to parents most excellent and beloved."

His daughter Dorothy (d.29 July 1601) became the wife of John Copleston Esq. (d.1606), of Eggesford, Devon, and their sole daughter Anne Copleston (1588–1616) married Edward Chichester, 1st Viscount Chichester (1568–1648) Governor of Carrickfergus and Lord High Admiral of Lough Neagh, in Ireland. Under the semi-circular tomb arch and above Sir George Beeston's effigy in armour a further inscription, when translated, reads:

"Hugh Beeston, knight, son of George Beeston, knight, mindful of mortality, and in certain hope of rising again in Christ, placed this monument to his parents, himself, and George Beeston an only son, of the same knightly order, a youth, alas! snatched away by a too early death. Hugh, the father, died in the year of our salvation, 1627, but George, the son, 1611."

=== Other features ===
In the south wall of the sanctuary are a triple sedilia and a double-draining piscina. In the south aisle are 15th century painted wooden panels which were formerly part of parclose screens; they were restored at the Victoria and Albert Museum in 1988. In the north aisle is a standing effigy of Jane Johnson, who died in 1741. Around 1760, it was removed to the churchyard and buried on the instruction of the incumbent. It was rediscovered in the 19th century and was restored to the interior of the church. Also in the church are three memorial boards which are believed to have been painted by members of the Randle Holme family of Chester. At the back of the church in the northeast corner are a number of stone coffin lids, and defaced effigies dating from the 13th to the 15th centuries. The organ was built in 1895 by P. Conacher of Huddersfield. It was extensively rebuilt in 1968 by Henry Willis & Sons.

The tower contains a ring of eight bells. The oldest two of these date from around 1500 and around 1610. Two later bells were cast by Rudhall of Gloucester in 1715 and 1758. The remaining bells were cast in the Whitechapel Bell Foundry by Thomas Mears II in 1817, and by Mears and Stainbank, two in 1895 and one in 1898. The parish registers begin in 1559 and the churchwardens' accounts in 1655. Carved stones dating from the Norman period have been discovered beneath the floor of the church and these are stored in the south porch.

== External features ==
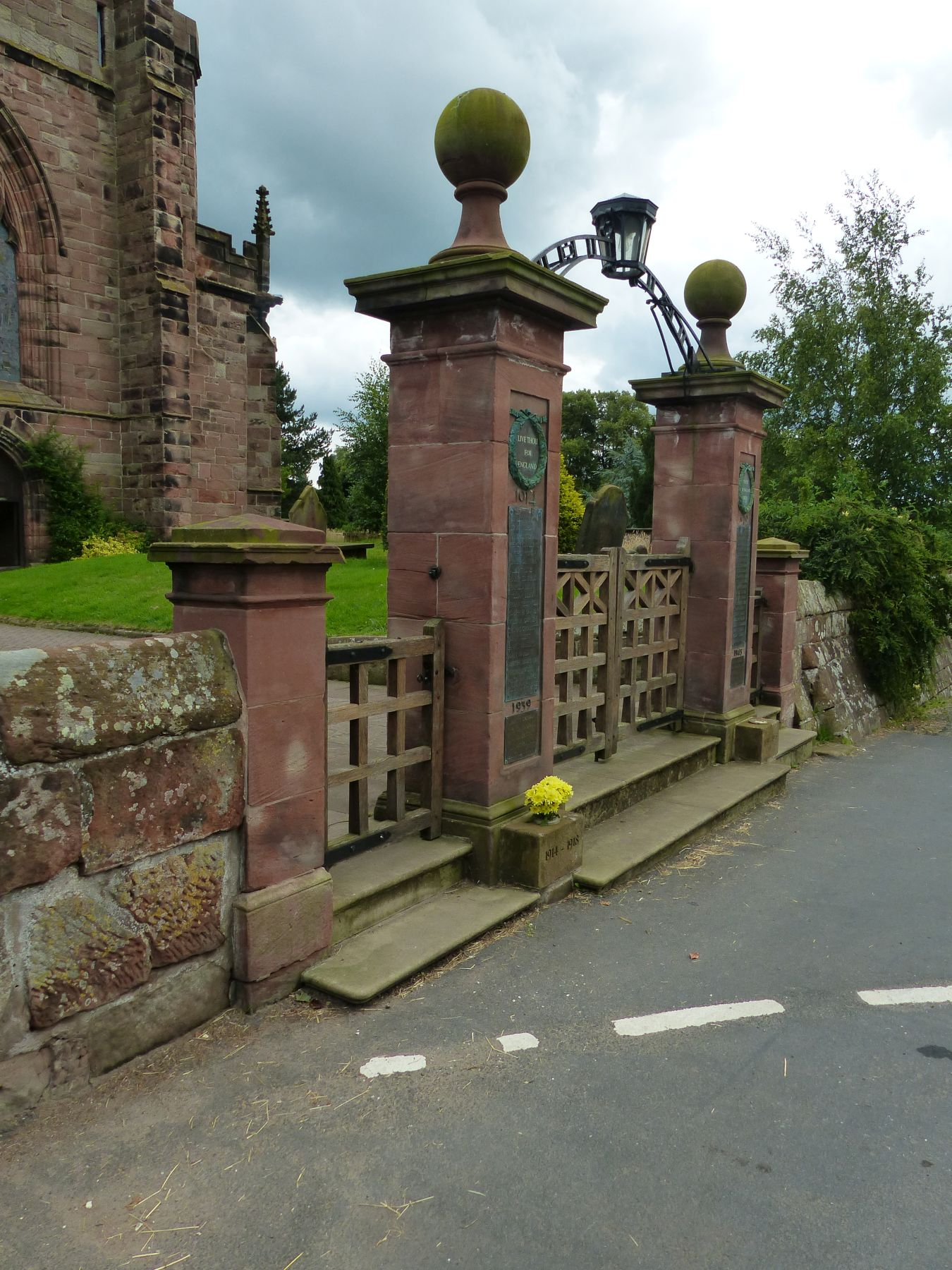
The west gates

The north gates to the church yard are listed at Grade II, as are the west gates which were reconstructed as memorial gates around 1919. In the church yard are two other structures listed at Grade II, a red sandstone sundial dated 1710, and a gravestone consisting of two sandstone slabs probably dating from the early 16th century. The old churchyard contains war graves of 5 soldiers of World War I and the churchyard extension those of 4 soldiers and a naval officer of World War II.

== See also ==
- Grade I listed buildings in Cheshire East
- Grade I listed churches in Cheshire
- Listed buildings in Bunbury, Cheshire
