= James Denton (priest) =

English cleric

James Denton (died 23 February 1533) was an English cleric. He was a Canon of Windsor from 1509 to 1533, Archdeacon of Cleveland from 1523 to 1533, and Dean of Lichfield from 1523 to 1532.

== Career ==
Denton was educated at Eton College and King's College, Cambridge, where he graduated BA in 1490, MS in 1492 and D.Can.L. in 1505 (incorporated from Valencia).

He was appointed:

- Rector of St Olave's Church, Southwark 1507
- Prebendary of Lichfield Cathedral 1509
- Prebendary of Highworth in Salisbury Cathedral 1509
- Prebendary of Lincoln Cathedral 1514
- Rector of St Swithun's Church, Headbourne Worthy, Hampshire
- Almoner and Chancellor to Mary Tudor, Queen of France
- Chaplain to Henry VIII
- Dean of Lichfield 1522–1533
- Archdeacon of Cleveland 1523–1532

He was appointed to the ninth stall in St George's Chapel, Windsor Castle in 1509, a position he held until 1533. He built a property in 1519 adjacent to the chapel, known as Denton's Commons, as a residence for the choristers and chantry priests to live and eat. This property was demolished in 1895.
