= Laurence Aldersey =

English explorer (1546–1597/8)

Laurence Aldersey (1546–1597/98) was an English explorer who made two journeys to the Levant, the accounts of which, ‘set downe by himself,’ are preserved in Principall Navigations by Richard Hakluyt.

He was born at Aldersey Hall in Spurstow, Cheshire, the sixth child of Thomas Aldersey (died 1557) and his wife, Cecilia née Garnet (fl. 1513–94). His father served as both sheriff and mayor of Chester. He is not known to have married. He was related to Thomas Aldersey (1521/2–98), a London merchant and member of parliament.

== First journey ==
Aldersey set out on his first journey on 1 April 1581, traveling overland through Holland and Germany to Venice, where he embarked on board a vessel bound for Cyprus. From there he sailed in a small bark and landed at Joppa (Jaffa), finally reaching Jerusalem, the goal of his journey on 12 August. After a visit of ten days to the Holy City and its environs, he returned by the way he came, passing through Nuremberg and Antwerp, and finishing his journey to and from Jerusalem in the space of nine months and five days.

== Second journey ==
His second journey was made by sea. Embarking at Bristol in the ship Hercules, of London, 21 February 1586, he sailed through the Straits and first touched at the Goletta of Tunis; from there he sailed to Zante and to Patras in the Morea. There, he and his company were received with honour by the cadi of the town, as they had on board the Hercules twenty Turks, ‘redeemed by Sir Francis Drake in the West Indies, at which the cadi marvailed much at the Queenes Maiestie of England being a woman of such power and renown.’ From there he sailed to various islands in the Grecian Archipelago, and after a second visit to Cyprus he landed at Tripolis, in Syria, whence he took a small passage boat and finally reached Alexandria on 28 July. The only Englishman to receive him there was Thomas Rickman, master of the ship Tyger of London, who worthily performed the duties of a guide to the place.

After visiting all the objects of interest in or near Alexandria and Cairo during a visit of fourteen days, he made his way to Argiers (Algiers); leaving this place on 7 January, he landed at Dartmouth on 1 February, and seven days later ‘came to London, with humble thanks to Almightie God for his safe arrival.’ Considering the period at which they were written, Aldersey's observations on men and cities are exceedingly curious and interesting; as, for instance, those upon Cologne, Augsburg, Venice, and Alexandria. His remarks upon the Doge and the Jews of Venice are worthy of the attention of the student of Shakespeare. Aldersey describes himself as a merchant of London.
