= Sam Rushton =

Anglican vicar in England

The Reverend Sam Rushton
- Archdeacon of York
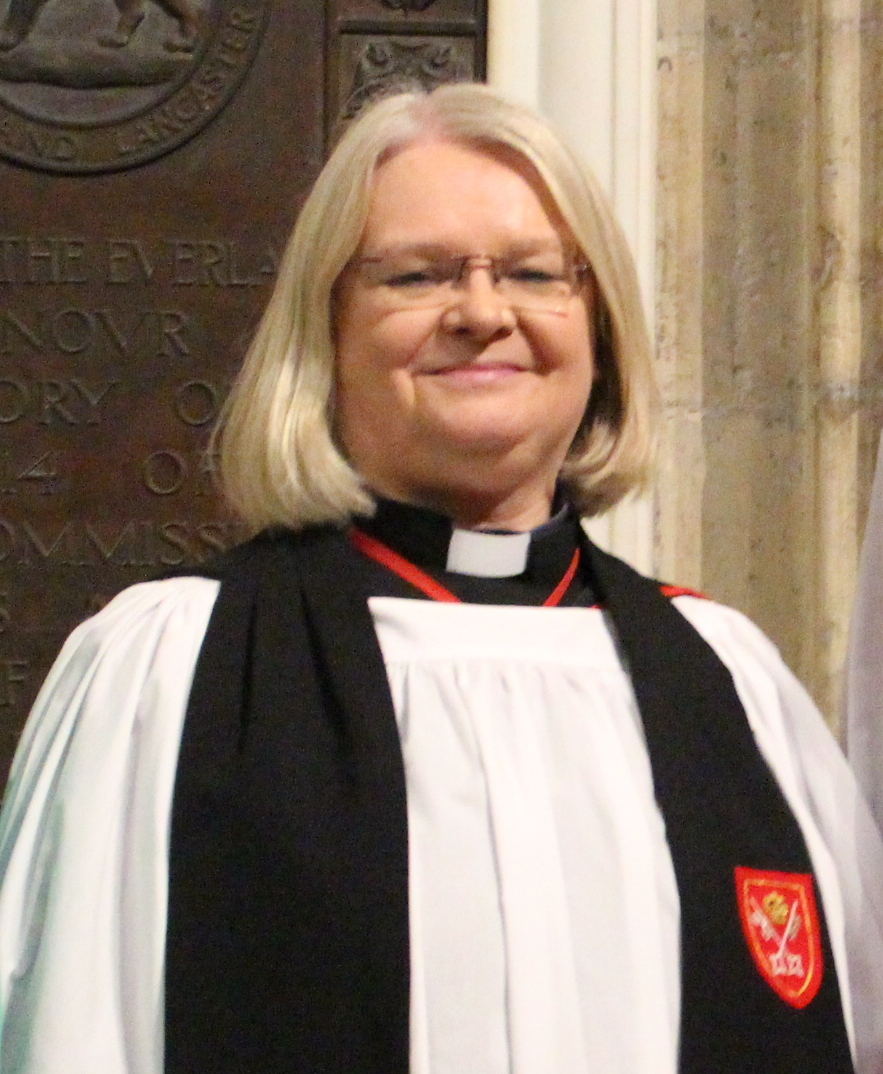
- Rushton in 2024
- Church: Church of England
- Diocese: Diocese of York
- In office: 9 October 2019 to 31 March 2025
- Predecessor: Sarah Bullock
- Other posts: Warden of Readers; Archdeacon of Cleveland (2015–2019)

Orders
- Ordination: 2005 (deacon); 2006 (priest)

Personal details
- Born: 1965 (age 60–61)
- Denomination: Anglicanism
- Occupation: Clerk in Holy Orders
- Education: St Hilda's College, Oxford; Trinity College, Bristol

Samantha Jayne Rushton (called Sam; born 1965) is a British Anglican priest, who was most recently the Archdeacon of York.

== Early life and education ==
Rushton was born in 1965. She studied Pure and Applied Biology at St Hilda's College, Oxford, graduating with a Bachelor of Arts (BA) degree in 1987. She then worked in banking, and her final job before leaving for theological college was with Lloyds TSB. Having left her first career, she matriculated into Trinity College, Bristol, an Evangelical Anglican theological college. She completed her training and graduated with a BA degree in theology in 2005.

== Ordained ministry ==
Rushton was ordained in the Church of England as a deacon in 2005 and as a priest in 2006. From 2005 to 2008, she served her curacy at St Michael and All Angels, Highworth and St Leonard's Church, Broad Blunsdon in the Diocese of Bristol. Then, from 2008 to 2015, she combined a diocesan appointment with parish ministry: she was Adviser for Licensed Ministry in the Diocese of Bristol, and a curate in the parish of St Paul, Chippenham with Hardenhuish and Langley Burrell, and at St Michael's Church, Kington St Michael. She was also Warden of Readers from 2011 to 2015, and Area Dean of Chippenham from 2013 to 2015.

In March 2015, it was announced that Rushton would be the next Archdeacon of Cleveland in the Diocese of York. On 6 May 2015, she was collated and licensed as archdeacon during a service at St Peter and St Paul's Church, Pickering.

In October 2019, Rushton transferred to a new role as Archdeacon of York. She was formally welcomed on 19 October at a public service in Selby Abbey led by the Bishop of Selby, the Right Reverend Dr John Thomson.

On 11 February 2025, it was announced that Rushton was to resign her archdeaconry (on or around 31 March) to become Diocesan Secretary (CEO) of the Diocese of Lichfield in late April.

== Personal life ==
Rushton is married to Peter Rushton. Together, they have two sons.
