= Ralph Coulton =

English priest

Ralph Coulton (died 1582) was a 16th century English priest, Archdeacon of Cleveland.

Coulton was educated at Trinity College, Cambridge. He was the incumbent at Wormley in Hertfordshire from 1564 to 1570; and Archdeacon of Cleveland] from then until his death on 5 May 1582.
