= Thomas Aldersey =

16th-century English businessman and politician

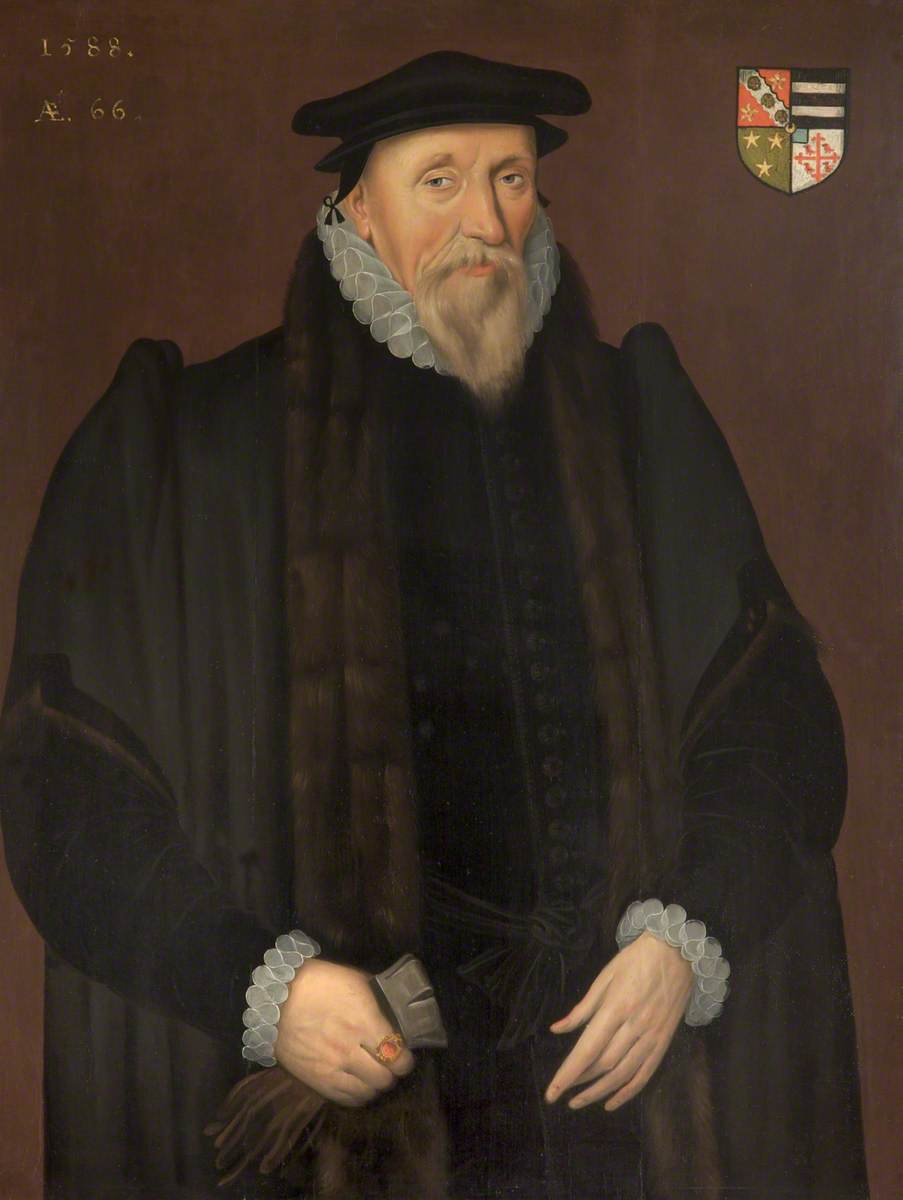
Thomas Aldersey, by Robert Peake the Elder (1588)

Thomas Aldersey (1521/22 – December 1598; also Aldersay or Aldersaye) was an English merchant, haberdasher, member of Parliament and philanthropist. A contemporary description placed him among the "wisest and best merchants in London", and he was particularly known for his efforts to set the Protestant colony of Emden on a secure trade footing. His charitable works included the establishment of a free grammar school at his birthplace of Bunbury in Cheshire.

== Early life ==
Aldersey was born in Bunbury, Cheshire. His father, John Aldersey (c. 1494–1554) of Aldersey Hall, was a landowner from Spurstow. His mother, Anne (or Agnes), was the daughter of Thomas Bird of Clutton or Colton. Several members of the Aldersey family were prominent in 16th-century Chester. Thomas Aldersey was the second of several sons of the marriage. He was educated in Bunbury, possibly at the Chantry House.

== London merchant and politician ==
Aldersey was apprenticed to the London merchant Thomas Bingham in 1541, becoming a liveried member of the Worshipful Company of Haberdashers on 13 July 1548. Exposure to Protestant Reformist speakers in London, including Christopher Goodman and Jan Łaski, led him to become a Protestant. Mary I's accession in 1553 made his religious and political convictions dangerous, and in 1555 he was charged over his attention to Goodman's writings. His efforts, which continued throughout his life, to aid the Protestant exiles who left England for Emden in Germany in establishing trading relationships gained him the support of William Cecil and other prominent Protestants.

Cecil's support and his wife's family's influence – he married into the Calthorpes in 1554 – helped Aldersey to gain stature among London traders during Elizabeth I's reign. He was active in the cloth trade with Germany, the Low Countries, Spain and the Baltic states, and was a prominent member of the Company of Haberdashers, the Company of Merchant Adventurers, the Spanish Company and the Eastland Company. He became known for his devoutness, honesty and business acumen, and was described by his peers as among the "wisest and best merchants in London". His popularity did not, however, extend to Chester, where he tried unsuccessfully to obtain the position of waiter at the waterside in 1595.

From the early 1570s, Aldersey held several political positions in London, including common councillor for his home parish of Cripplegate (from 1571), city auditor (1571–72) and serjeant to the Sheriff of the City (1576). He was elected as one of the four London MPs at a by-election on 7 October 1579, following the death of John Marsh; he was re-elected three times, continuing to serve until 1592. He is not recorded as having made any speeches, but sat on multiple Parliamentary committees mainly relating to trade. The Privy Council employed him in 1574 to investigate claims against Spain, and he also investigated various trade-related matters for the Privy Council and the Admiralty, including smuggling, piracy, inflation and the gold trade.

== Personal life and charitable works ==
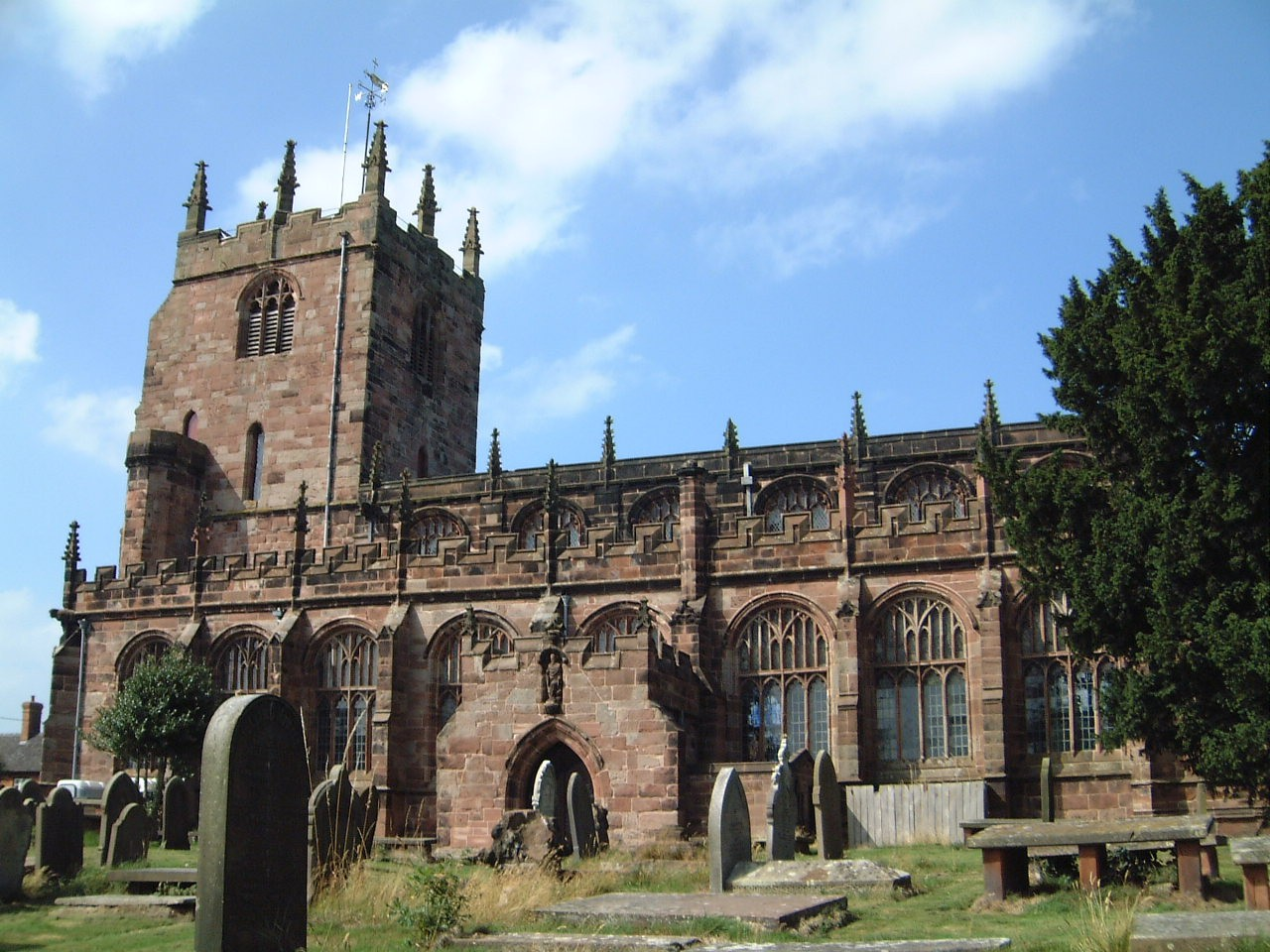
Aldersey was buried at St Boniface's Church, Bunbury, where he had endowed a preacher and curate

Aldersey had a house in Cripplegate. In 1554, he married Alice Calthorpe (or Calthrop) (1526 to 1589–95), daughter of Richard Calthorpe of Antingham, Norfolk. The Calthorpes were an influential family in London; his brother-in-law Martin Calthorpe served as Lord Mayor of London in 1589. The couple did not have children. After his elder brother John's death in 1582, Aldersey assisted two of his sons. He remained a deeply religious man, with his views in later life also being described as Puritan.

He was active in charitable works in both London and Cheshire. In London, he was a governor of Bridewell Hospital (1574–79), St Thomas' Hospital (1581–84) and Christ's Hospital (1585–96). He was also active in the 1570s in collecting funds to support impoverished students at the universities of Oxford and Cambridge. In Cheshire, he supported a project to build a conduit in Chester in 1582. He helped to organise relief efforts after the 1583 fire in Nantwich, serving with Thomas Brassey as London representative of the rebuilding fund, and collecting over £2,700.

In his birthplace, Bunbury, he founded a grammar school in 1575, which was incorporated on 2 January 1594 as "The Free Grammar School of Thomas Aldersey in Bunbury" – now Bunbury Aldersey School. He gave the school, together with substantial endowments, over to the Company of Haberdashers on 21 October 1594. It was the first school that the company – now predominantly an educational charity – administered. At the same time, he established a preacher and curate in Bunbury, and gave the tithes and advowson (patronage) of the parish church to the Haberdashers' Company; this was the first ecclesiastical living to come under the company's control. Dorothy Williams Whitney has suggested that this gift was associated with the later Puritanism of the Company of Haberdashers, and Bunbury became an early centre for Cheshire nonconformism.

Aldersey died at Aldersey Hall in Spurstow, Cheshire, in December 1598, and was buried – by his request, "without any pomp" – at St Boniface's Church in Bunbury. He was a wealthy man at his death, leaving bequests totalling nearly £2,000 in his will. He left £100 to Christ's Hospital, as well as money to alleviate poverty in London, Putney in Surrey, Barking in Essex, and Bunbury and Chester in Cheshire. Around half of his property was allocated to the ongoing support of his grammar school; the remainder went to his nephew, John Aldersey of Berden, Essex (died 1616).

== See also ==
- Laurence Aldersey, an explorer who was Thomas Aldersey's relative
