= Timothy Thurscross =

English Anglican cleric

Timothy Thurscross was Archdeacon of Cleveland from 1635 to 1638.

Thurcross was educated at Magdalen College, Oxford. He became a Canon of York in 1622; Vicar of Kirkby Moorside in 1625; Archdeacon of Cleveland in 1635; and Fellow of Eton College in 1669. He died in the parish of St. Sepulchre's, City of London in November in 1671.
