= John Burton (archdeacon of Cleveland) =

Former Archdeacon of Cleveland

John Burton was Archdeacon of Cleveland from his installation on 23 July 1685 until his death on 24 November 1700.

Burton was born in Sedbergh was educated at St John's College, Cambridge. He migrated to University of Oxford in 1675. He was Vicar of Rushden and a canon of York.

Church of England titles
Preceded by arnabas Long	Archdeacon of Cleveland; 1685–1700	Succeeded by James Fall
