= Thomas Lindsay (priest) =

Thomas Enraght Lindsay (8 November 1863 – 7 September 1947) was an English churchman, Archdeacon of Cleveland from 1907 until 1938.

The son of the Rev. Thomas Lindsay, rector of Castle Ellis, County Wexford, he was educated at Manchester Grammar School and Sidney Sussex College, Cambridge. He was ordained in 1886 and became Chaplain of Epsom College. He then served a curacy in Doncaster. He held incumbencies at Loversal (1891–1892); Middlesbrough (1893–1905); Scarborough (1905–1913); Saltburn-by-the-Sea (1913–1925); and Stokesley (1925–1936).

Lindsay died on 7 September 1947. He had married in 1894 Maria Isabel (Minnie) Massy-Dawson, daughter of the late George Staunton King Massy-Dawson, of the 14th Light Dragoons and Ballynacourte, son of James Hewitt Massy Dawson MP, and his wife Grace Leeson.
