= John Richardson (Archdeacon of Cleveland) =

Archdeacon of Cleveland

John Richardson (6 February 1676 in North Bierley – 28 October 1735 in York) was Archdeacon of Cleveland from 3 August 1711 to his death on 28 October 1735.

Richardson was educated at Christ's College, Cambridge. He held livings at Burton Agnes and Beeford.
