= Bunbury, Cheshire =

Village in Cheshire, England

Coordinates: 53.118°N 2.645°W

Bunbury
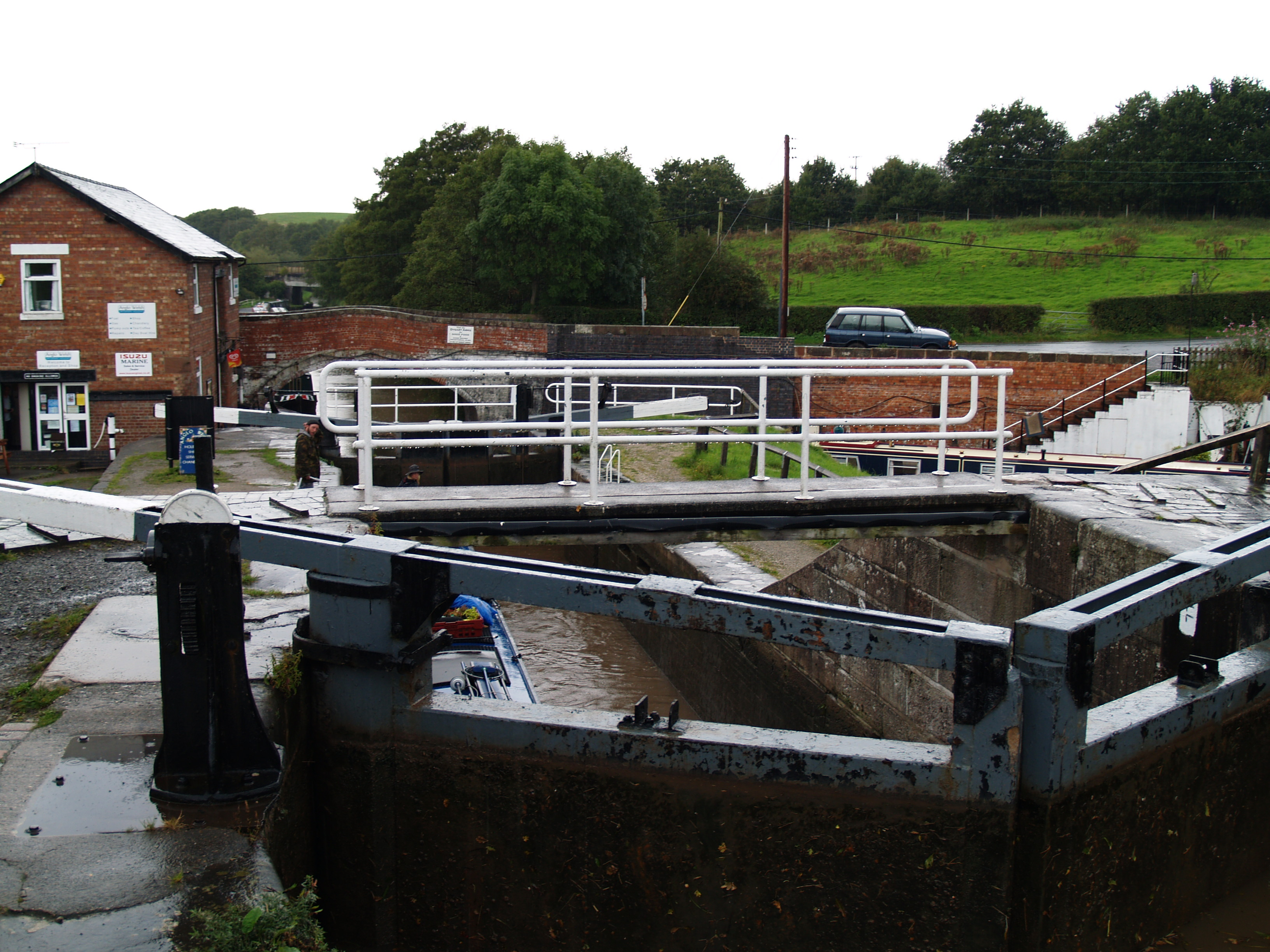
- Bunbury staircase locks

- Location within Cheshire
- Population: 1,195 (2011 Census)
- OS grid reference: SJ568580
- Civil parish: Bunbury
- Unitary authority: Cheshire East
- Ceremonial county: Cheshire
- Region: North West
- Country: England
- Sovereign state: United Kingdom
- Post town: TARPORLEY
- Postcode district: CW6
- Dialling code: 01829
- Police: Cheshire
- Fire: Cheshire
- Ambulance: North West
- UK Parliament: Chester South and Eddisbury

Bunbury is a village in Cheshire, England, south of Tarporley and north west of Nantwich on the Shropshire Union Canal. At the 2011 Census, it had a population of 1,195.

== History ==
Bunbury was reputedly derived from Buna-burh, meaning the "redoubt of Buna". Just prior to the Norman Conquest of 1066 it was held by a certain Dedol of Tiverton. Its name was written as Boleberie in the Domesday Survey of 1086 and the lord of the fief was Robert FitzHugh. Listed as lying in the hundred of Rushton and the county of Cheshire, it had a recorded population of 3 households in 1086, meaning that it was one of smallest 20% of settlements at that time.

A Norman family later acquired the surname of De Boneberi, and were linked to Rake Hall during and after the reign of King Stephen. They were allegedly a cadet line of the Norman family of De St Pierre, associated with Hugh "Lupus" Earl of Chester, one of the famous "marcher lords" of the Welsh Marches. Then the fief was governed by the family of Hugh Claveley that held the manor of Calveley in Bunbury, Cheshire, living in Calveley Hall that came into the possession of the Davenport family through marriage in 1369.

Much later, in the era of the English Civil War and on the date of 23 December 1642 some of the prominent gentlemen of Cheshire met in Bunbury and drew up the Bunbury Agreement. The terms of the agreement were intended to keep Cheshire neutral during the English Civil War. It proved to be a forlorn hope because the national strategic importance of Cheshire and the city port of Chester meant that national interests overruled local ones.

Bunbury was a victim of the Blitz during World War II. German aircraft returning from a night raid on Liverpool in 1940 jettisoned surplus bombs over the village, obliterating Church Row (the houses have since been rebuilt). The blast caused minor damage to the exterior of St Boniface's Church and the immediate area. The original village centre surrounding the church was hit, damaging shops beyond repair. This has largely caused the current centre to evolve in the geographical heart of the village.

Four old villages have combined to form the modern-day Bunbury. These are:

- Higher Bunbury (centred on the church and the Dysart Arms),
- Lower Bunbury (the main part of the village today),
- Bunbury Heath (essentially School Lane) and
- Bunbury Common (from Higher Bunbury towards Bunbury Locks).

The last three have coalesced to form a single village. The River Gowy is a natural division between Higher and Lower Bunbury.

Bunbury was used in the autumn of 2014 as the setting for the fictional village of 'Great Paxford' in the ITV drama Home Fires.

== Landmarks ==
Bunbury Locks is a working wharf with some "high-rise" staircase locks and canal horse stables.

Bunbury Mill is a watermill dating from 1844, although there has been a mill on this site since 1290. Following damage caused by a flood in 1960, the mill closed in 1966. It was restored to working order and reopened to the public as a museum by North West Water Authority (later part of United Utilities). It was closed again in 2010, and passed into the ownership of the Bunbury Watermill Trust, who have reopened it to visitors.

The Chantry House is a grade-II*-listed timber-framed building dating from around 1527, which originally housed the two chantry priests of the Ridley chantry of St Boniface's Church, and later formed part of the free grammar school founded by Thomas Aldersey.

== Community ==
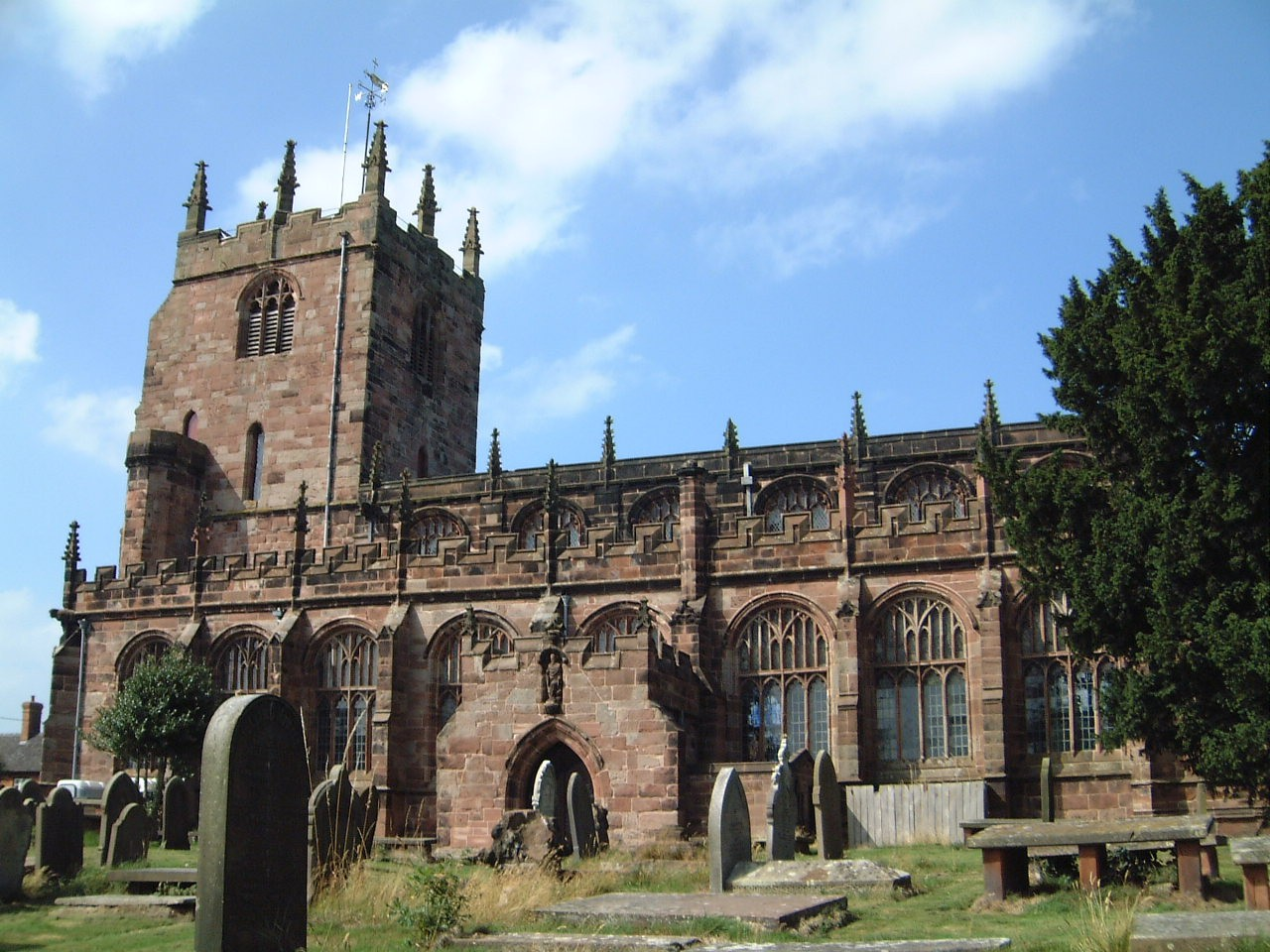
Bunbury, St Boniface

The main lane in Bunbury is Bunbury Lane which contains three shops (butcher, general convenience store/Post Office and fish and chip shop), two hairdressers, and three pubs - the Nags Head, the Dysart Arms (Cheshire Dining Pub of the Year 2009) and the Yew Tree (formerly the Crewe Arms) which re-opened in 2010.

Bunbury Aldersey C of E Primary school is in School Lane.

The parish church is dedicated to Saint Boniface and is built on the highest point of the village. It is over 1,000 years old and is built on an older pagan site. This was a collegiate church built in the 14th century; the nave arcades and aisle windows are about 100 years later than this. There is an alabaster effigy of the founder of the college, Sir Hugh Calveley, other effigies, and a 17th-century tomb. It was restored after bomb damage during the Second World War.

Bunbury has amenities such as a cricket pavilion, sports pitches, tennis courts, a scout hut (with a new one under construction in 2011) and a village hall. It also has some clubs and societies.

Sadlers Wells Woods is located near the A49 road. The wooded area was also mentioned in the Domesday Book written in the time of William the Conqueror.

== Notable residents ==
- Thomas Aldersey (1521/2–1598), a London merchant and philanthropist, was born in Bunbury and founded a free grammar school there in 1575.
- William Hinde (1568/9–1629), a well-known Puritan and author, was curate at St Boniface's from around 1603 until his death.
- Beth Tweddle Olympic gymnast

== See also ==
- Listed buildings in Bunbury, Cheshire
- Hugh Calveley
