= William Hinde (priest) =

William Hinde (1569?–1629) was an English priest and author, of Puritan views.

== Life ==
Born at Kendal, Westmoreland, about 1569, he entered The Queen's College, Oxford, in Michaelmas term 1586 as a servitor; he was elected successively tabarder and perpetual fellow. He graduated with Bachelor of Arts (BA) on 2 July 1591, and Oxford Master of Arts (MA Oxon) 2 July 1594.

About 1603, he became perpetual curate of Bunbury, Cheshire. He was a leader of the nonconformists in Cheshire, and clashed with Thomas Morton as bishop of Chester. Hinde died at Bunbury in June 1629, and was buried there.

== Works ==
An admirer of John Rainolds, Hinde edited his Prophecie of Obadiah opened and applyed in sundry … sermons, Oxford, 1613, and The Discovery of the Man of Sinne … preached in divers sermons, Oxford, 1614. With John Dod he wrote Bathshebaes Instructions to her sonne Lemuel: containing a fruitfull … exposition of the last chapter of Proverbs, London, 1614.

His own writings include:

- A Path to Pietie, leading to the Way, the Truth, and the Life, Christ Jesus, Oxford, 1613.
- The Office and Use of the Moral Law of God in the days of the Gospel justified and explained at large, London, 1623.
- A faithful Remonstrance: or the Holy Life and Happy Death of John Bruen of Bruen-Stapleford, in the County of Chester, Esq., London, 1641, published by Hinde's son Samuel, who was chaplain to Charles II and incumbent of the Church of St Mary the Virgin, Dover.

== Family ==
John Bruen was probably Hinde's brother-in-law; Hinde's wife Margaret is thought to be a daughter of William Foxe, whose daughter Anne married Bruen as his second wife. Hinde and his wife had nine children who survived.
