= Bishop's Manor =

Manor house in Howden, East Riding of Yorkshire, England

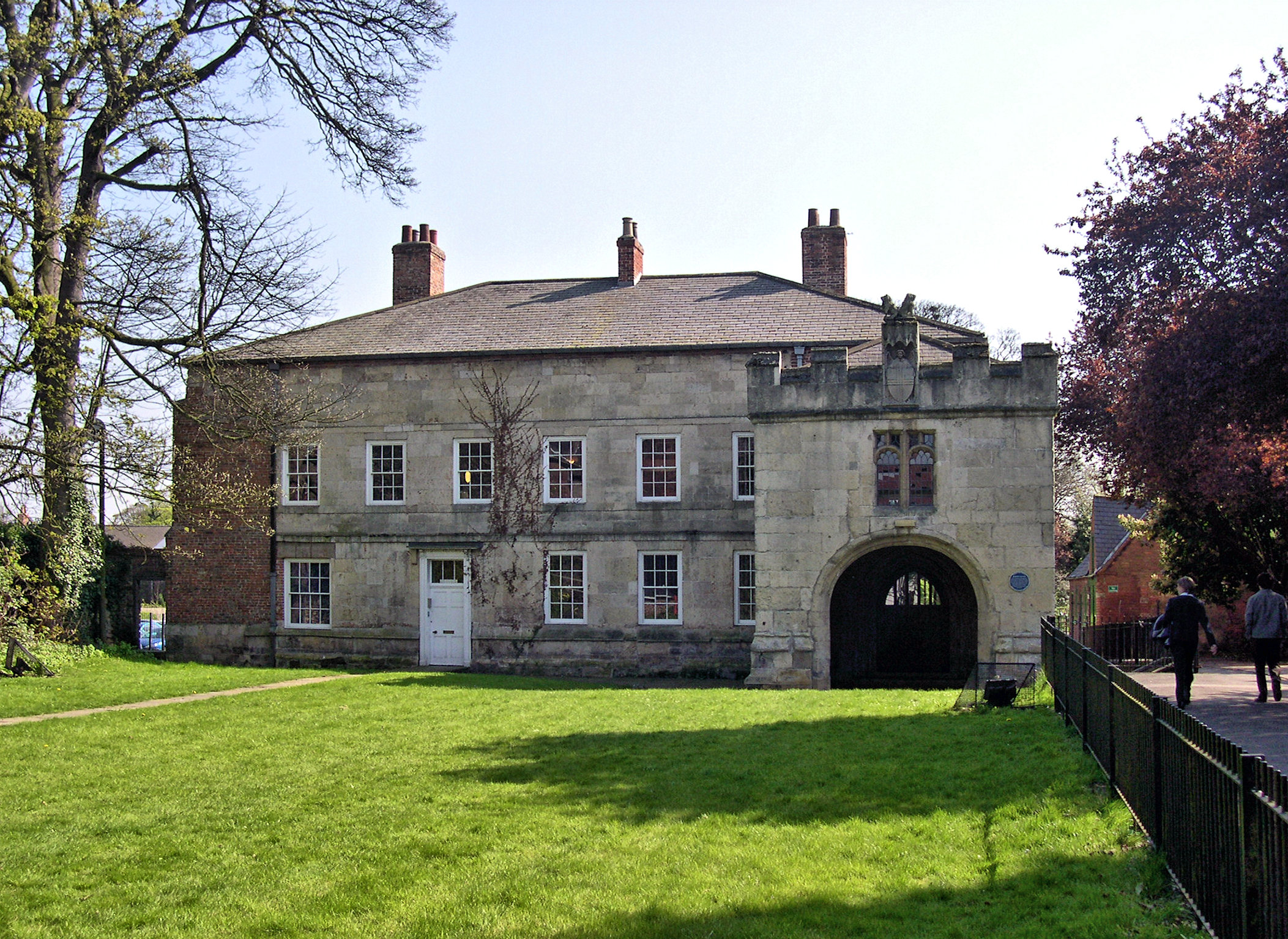
The building, in 2005

Bishop's Manor is a historic building in Howden, a town in the East Riding of Yorkshire, in England.

== History ==
A palace was built in Howden for the Bishop of Durham around 1200. It was largely rebuilt for Walter Skirlaw between 1388 and 1405. Most of the palace was demolished in the late 16th century, with only a gateway, two walls, and the bishop's house surviving. The great hall was altered to become a private two-storey dwelling. It was further altered in the 18th century, the work including refenestration, and again in the early 19th century. It was disused in the mid 20th century and fell into poor repair. It suffered a fire in 1977 and demolition was considered, but it was instead restored by Weightman and Brown between 1983 and 1985 as offices. The building was grade II* listed in 1952 and the entire site is a scheduled monument.

== Architecture ==
=== House ===
The building is constructed of magnesian limestone and brick, and has a hipped Welsh slate roof. The north front has two storeys and seven bays, and a projecting porch on the right. It mainly has a moulded plinth, and there are two floor bands. The doorway has a divided fanlight and a bracketed cornice, and the windows are sashes. The porch has two storeys, a stepped chamfered plinth, and a projecting embattled parapet with a central niche surmounted by a pair of dogs, and containing a figure holding a shield. It contains a wide round archway above which is two-light window. The south front has tall buttresses, and a medieval pointed doorway. Inside there are fireplaces dating from the 18th and 19th centuries. The 17th-century main staircase was largely destroyed in a fire and has been replaced by a replica.

=== Langley Archway ===
The Langley Archway is built of brick with stone dressings, two storeys and two bays. It contains a four-centred arch with two moulded orders in a square-headed frame, over which is a stepped string course. Above this is an angel carrying a coat of arms, flanked by two windows with trefoil-cusped heads, and above is a fragmentary coved course. The coat of arms belong to Thomas Langley, who was Bishop of Durham from 1406 to 1437, during which period the archway was constructed. The brickwork is similar to that of Beverley Bar. It is also grade II* listed.

=== Fruit House ===
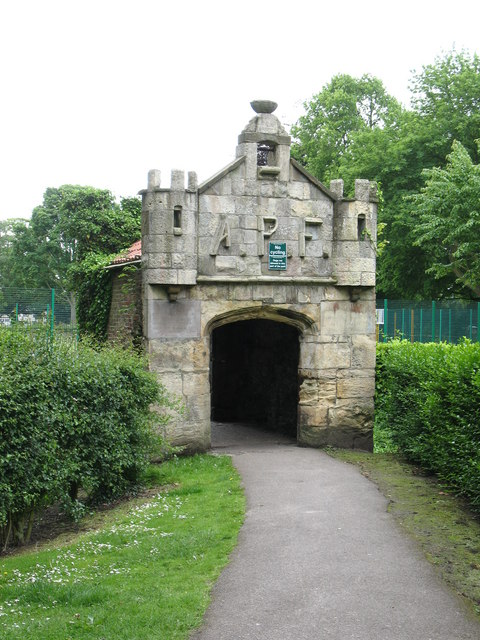
The Fruit House

The Fruit House was built in the early 15th century, as a gatehouse leading to fish ponds. The lower parts of the structure contain mediaeval masonry, but the upper parts were assembled from various fragments in the late 19th or early 20th century. It is built of stone and brick, with a single storey and a single bay, and sits on a pointed arch bridge over a moat. Above the arch is a string course, a coped gable with letters in relief, surmounted by a bellcote, and flanked by round embattled turrets. On the building are two inscribed plaques. It is grade II listed.

== See also ==
- Grade II* listed buildings in the East Riding of Yorkshire
- Listed buildings in Howden
