= Revans =

Revans may refer to:

== People ==
- John Revans, secretary to the English Poor Law Commission
- Reg Revans (1907–2003), academic who pioneered the use of action learning
- Samuel Revans (c.1807–1888), New Zealand newspaper owner, entrepreneur, and politician

== Other ==
- Revans University, an online unaccredited degree-awarding body

== See also ==
- Revan (disambiguation)
