= Howden Market Cross =

Market cross in Howden, East Riding of Yorkshire, England

Coordinates: 53°44′43″N 0°51′58″W

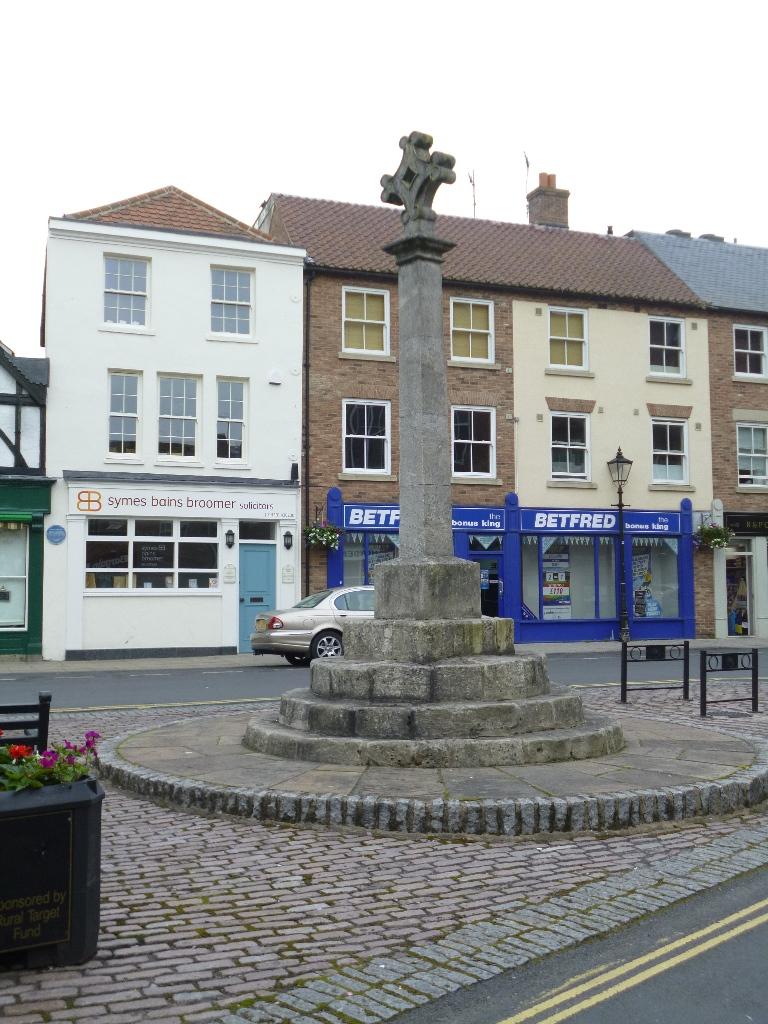
The cross, in 2014

Howden Market Cross is a historic structure in Howden, a town in the East Riding of Yorkshire, in England.

Howden was granted a charter to hold a fair in 1200, and a market in the town was first recorded in 1296 or 1297. A market cross was constructed in the town's market place in the mediaeval period. The shaft and head of the cross were later removed, but the base survived. In 1909, T. S. Ullathorne carved a new cross, which was set in the old base. The whole structure was grade II listed in 1952.

The cross is carved from stone and is about 5 metres (16 ft) in height. It has a circular base of three steps, on which is a square modern base, a shaft with a square section and a moulded capital and a foliated cross. On the base is a cast iron plaque with an inscription. The whole structure is about 5 metres high.

The cross was knocked down after being struck by a vehicle on 22 October 2026.

== See also ==
- Listed buildings in Howden
