= Sacred Heart Church, Howden =

Church in Howden, East Riding of Yorkshire, England

Coordinates: 53°44′34″N 0°52′16″W

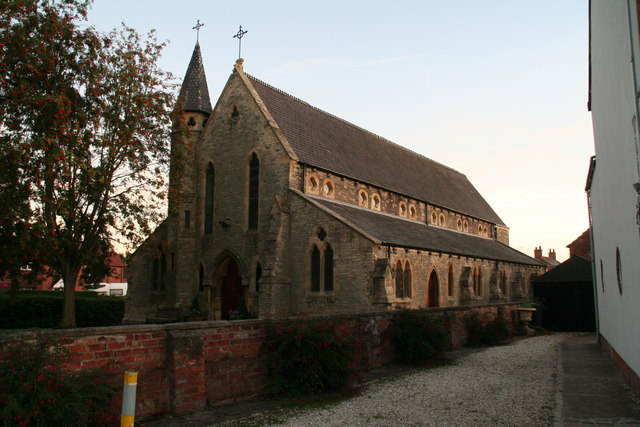
The church, in 2013

Sacred Heart Church is a Catholic church in Howden, a town in the East Riding of Yorkshire, in England.

Robert Cooke and Ambrose Camburini began a mission to Howden in the 1840s, and requested permission to hold worship in Howden Town Hall. This was refused, and so Cooke instead built a temporary chapel. In 1850, it was replaced by a permanent church, to a design by Joseph Hansom. A small grotto dedicated to Our Lady of Lourdes was created, probably in the 1930s, while in the 1980s the area below the west gallery was walled, to create a porch and meeting room. The building was grade II listed in 1987. It is linked to the former presbytery, with its ground floor now used as a parish centre.

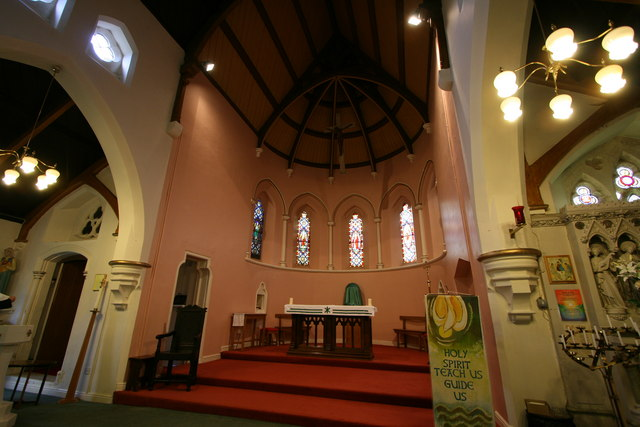
The chancel

The church is built of white brick with stone dressings and a slate roof. It consists of a nave, aisles, a chancel with an apse, and a western bell turret. The bell turret is octagonal, it has two stages, a string course, a trefoil band at the top, and a small spire. Inside, the original carved oak altar survives, and there is an older side altar brought from Everingham Hall. There is also a 17th-century chair, and stained glass, some designed by John Barnett.

== See also ==
- Listed buildings in Howden
