= Howden War Memorial =

War memorial in Howden, East Riding of Yorkshire, England

Coordinates: 53°44′46″N 0°52′03″W

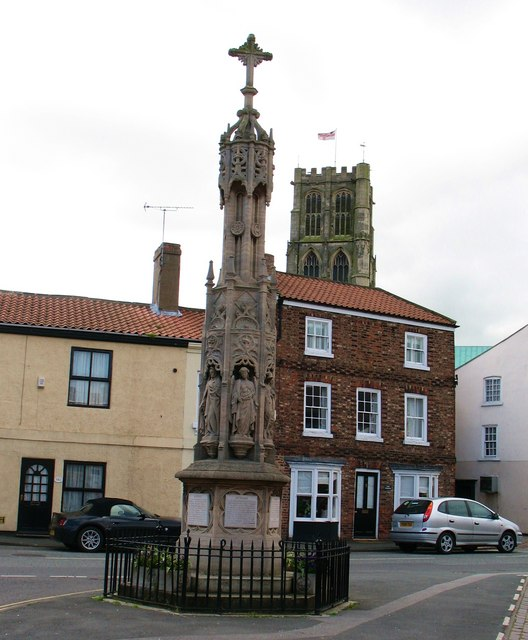
The structure, in 2009

Howden War Memorial is a historic structure in Howden, a town in the East Riding of Yorkshire, in England.

The war memorial is in St Helen's Square and commemorates local victims of World War I. It was constructed in 1920, to a design by Clement William Jewett. The memorial was grade II listed in 1966.

The memorial is carved from stone, and has an octagonal plan. It has a moulded base on two steps, with panels containing blind tracery and inscribed plaques. Above is a moulded cornice, and round-headed niches containing statues, flanked by offset buttresses with finials. There are carved spandrels and a parapet, a tall pinnacle with blind niches holding paterae and with complex hoods, and the whole is surmounted by a cross.

== See also ==
- Listed buildings in Howden
