= Revan (disambiguation) =

Revan is a fictional Star Wars character created for Star Wars: Knights of the Old Republic.

Revan may also refer to:

== People ==
- Clan Revan, a Highland Scottish clan
- Revan Kelly (born 1999), Sri Lankan cricketer
- Revan Nath, the 7th or 8th Navnath (Hindu saint)
- Revan Nurianto (born 2002), Indonesian football winger
- Dominic Revan (born 2000), English football defender
- Sebastian Revan (born 2003), English footballer

== Other uses ==
- Star Wars: The Old Republic: Revan, 2011 novel part of the Star Wars expanded universe
- Revan, the Albanian name of the village of Raveni, Greece

== See also ==
- Revans (disambiguation)
