= Howden Town Hall =

Municipal building in Howden, East Riding of Yorkshire, England

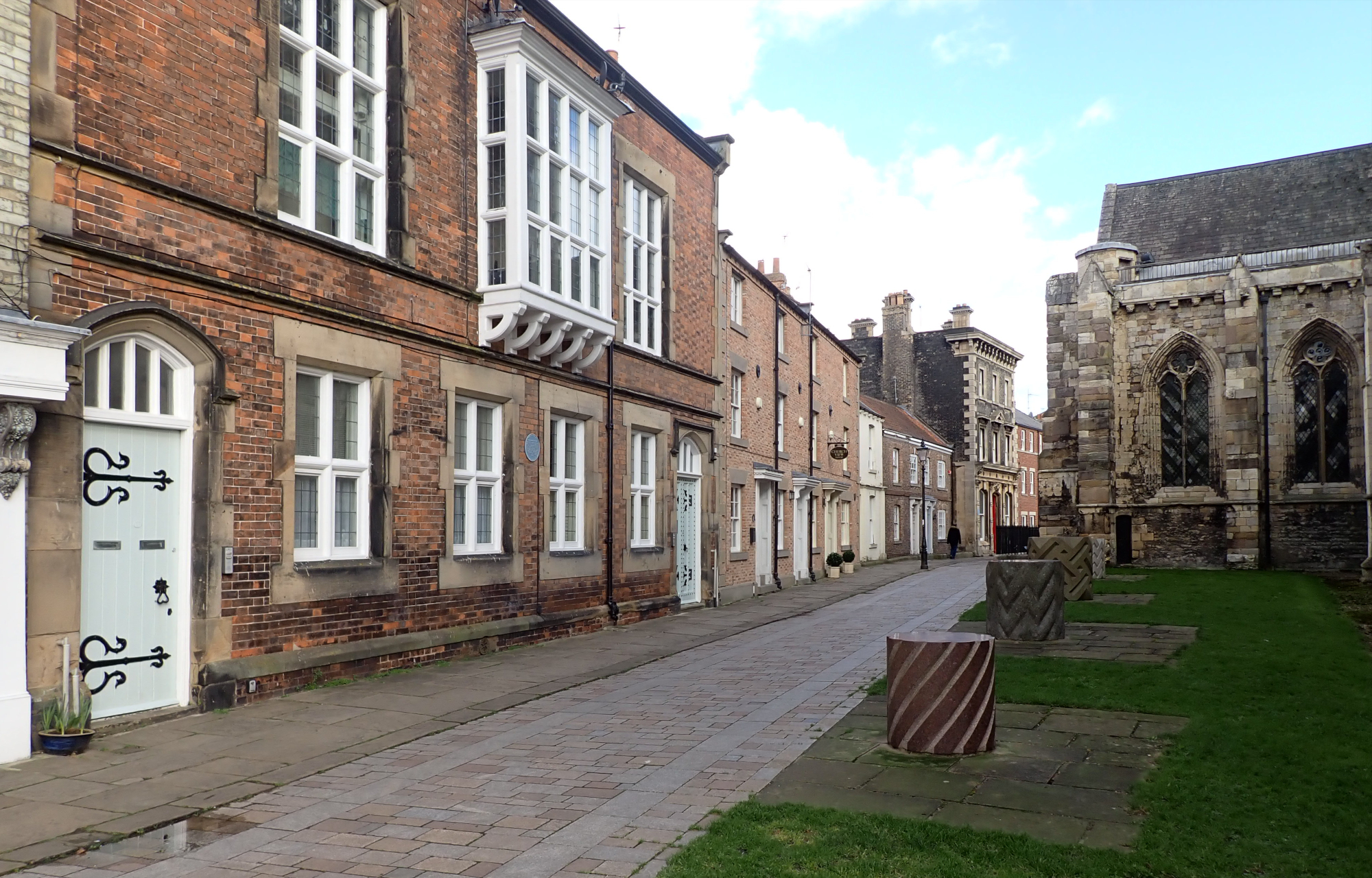
- The building in February 2022

- Shown in the East Riding of Yorkshire
- 53.7456°N 0.8677°W
- Location: Churchside, Howden

History
- Built: 1851

Site notes
- Architect(s): John Grey Weightman and Matthew Ellison Hadfield
- Architectural styles: Mix of Neoclassical style and Gothic Revival style

Howden Town Hall is a former municipal building in Churchside in Howden, a town in the East Riding of Yorkshire in England. It is currently in residential use.

== History ==
The building, at 10–11 Churchside, was commissioned within a gated community on the north side of Howden Minster in the mid-20th century. Construction started in 1850. It was designed by John Grey Weightman and Matthew Ellison Hadfield in a mix of the neoclassical style and Gothic Revival style, built in red brick with stone finishings and was completed in 1851.

The building originally housed a magistrates' court on the first floor and a savings bank and mechanics' institute on the ground floor. The magistrates continued to hold hearings on the first floor of the building at least until 1867 when they heard a case of a railway labourer, William Teare, who was accused of robbing James Jackson and of escaping with Jackson's money and his wife. However, by the late 19th century, magistrates' court hearings had moved to the Shire Hall in the Market Place. The building also hosted concerts, lectures and meetings of the local vestry, which had previously met in the chapter house attached to the minster.

During the Second World War, the building operated as a Women's Voluntary Service clothing store. The building was later converted for residential use and was divided up into four individual flats.

== Architecture ==
The design of the two-storey building involved a symmetrical main frontage of six bays facing onto Churchside. The outer bays had doorways with arches above and featured elaborate wrought iron decoration, while the four inner bays on the ground floor were fenestrated by mullioned and transomed windows. On the first floor, there was a large oriel window flanked by a pair of mullioned and transomed windows.
