= Knedlington =

Hamlet in the East Riding of Yorkshire, England

Coordinates: 53°44′37″N 0°53′23″W

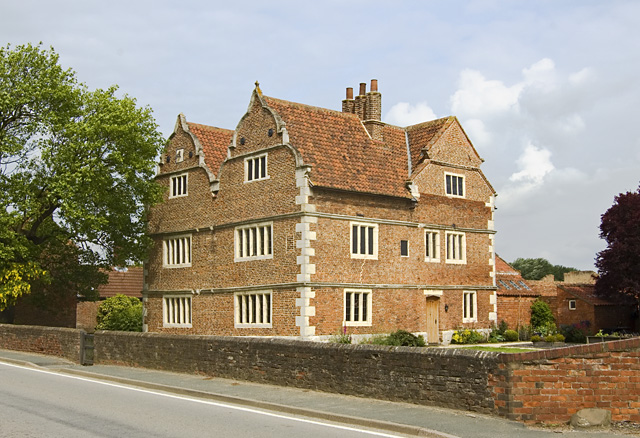
- The Old Hall, Knedlington

- Location within the East Riding of Yorkshire
- OS grid reference: SE733280
  - London: 155 mi (249 km) S
- Civil parish: Asselby
- Unitary authority: East Riding of Yorkshire
- Ceremonial county: East Riding of Yorkshire
- Region: Yorkshire and the Humber
- Country: England
- Sovereign state: United Kingdom
- Post town: GOOLE
- Postcode district: DN14
- Dialling code: 01430
- Police: Humberside
- Fire: Humberside
- Ambulance: Yorkshire
- UK Parliament: Goole and Pocklington

Knedlington is a small hamlet and former civil parish, now in the parish of Asselby, in the East Riding of Yorkshire, England. It is situated approximately 1 mile (1.6 km) west of the market town of Howden and lies to the west of the B1228 road. The M62 motorway is just over 1 mile to the south-east. Village landmarks include Knedlington Manor, Knedlington Hall, and woodland. Knedlington Hall was protected as a Grade II* listed building in 1966. In 1931, the parish had a population of 86.

The name Knedlington derives from the Old English Cneddelingastūn or Cneddelingtūn, meaning 'settlement of Cneddel's people' or 'settlement connected with Cneddel'.

In 1823, Knedlington was in the civil parish of Howden and the Wapentake Liberty of Howdenshire. Recorded was the hall built in the reign of Elizabeth I at the west of the village. The population at the time was 118. Occupations included a farmer, a horse dealer, and the landlord of the Anchor public house. The resident was a gentleman and two yeoman, one of whom was the chief constable and agent to a London insurance company.

Knedlington was formerly a township in the parish of Howden. From 1866, Knedlington was a civil parish in its own right. On 1 April 1935, the parish was abolished and merged with Asselby, Howden, Eastrington and Kilpin.

== See also ==
- Listed buildings in Asselby
