= St Helen's Church, Barmby on the Marsh =

Coordinates: 53.7477°N 0.9549°W

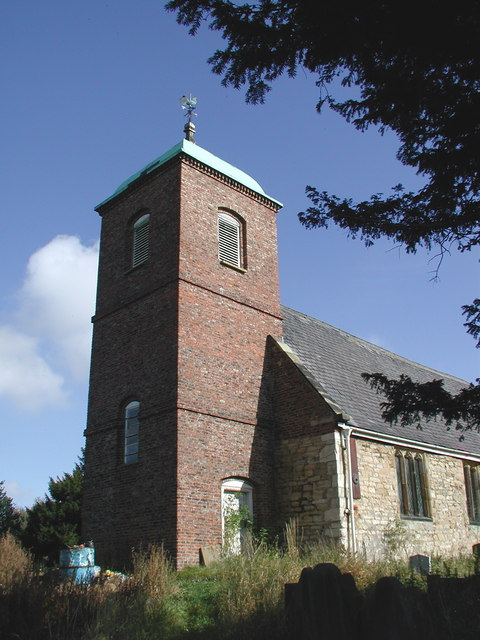
- "Charming Georgian brick tower"

- Location in the East Riding of Yorkshire
- OS grid reference: SE 69016 28433
- Location: Barmby on the Marsh, East Riding of Yorkshire
- Country: England
- Denomination: Anglican

Architecture
- Functional status: Redundant
- Heritage designation: Grade II
- Designated: 16 December 1966
- Architectural type: Church

Specifications
- Materials: Brick and stone

The Church of St Helen, Barmby on the Marsh, East Riding of Yorkshire, England is a redundant church which is now in the care of the Friends of Friendless Churches. The church is recorded in the National Heritage List for England as a designated Grade II listed building.

== History and description ==
The earliest record of a building on the site of St Helen's dates to 1388 and records a grant of permission for the construction of a chapel. The Friends of Friendless Churches notes the tradition that the nave of the church was originally a tithe barn. By the late 18th century the church was derelict and a rebuilding in 1773 saw the construction of the tower, in brick with an ogee copper cupola. The church was closed in 2007 and, following failed attempts to sell it, by 2014 faced the threat of demolition. It was transferred to the charity, Friends of Friendless Churches, in November 2020.

The nave is the only remaining element of the 16th century church. The chancel dates from the Victorian rebuilding of 1870. Nikolaus Pevsner and David Neave, in the Yorkshire: York and the East Riding volume of the Buildings of England, note the "charming Georgian brick tower". St Helen's is a Grade II listed building.

== See also ==
- Listed buildings in Barmby on the Marsh

== Sources ==
- Pevsner, Nikolaus; Neave, David (2005). Yorkshire: York and the East Riding. The Buildings of England. New Haven and London: Yale University Press. ISBN 0-300-09593-7.
