= Knedlington Old Hall =

Historic building in Knedlington, East Riding of Yorkshire, England

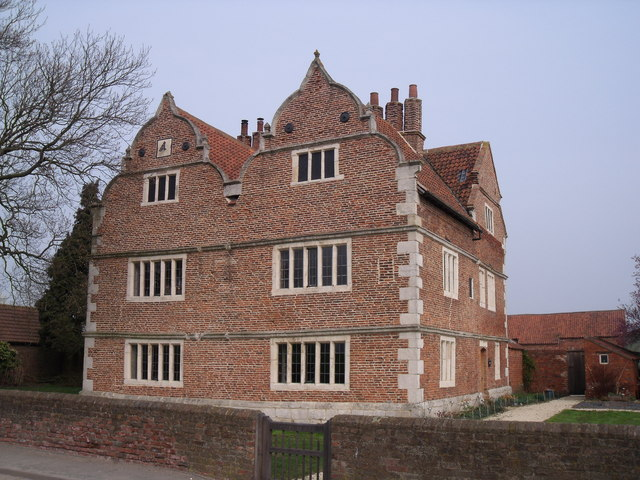
- The house in 2011

- Location within East Riding of Yorkshire

General information
- Location: Main Street, Knedlington, East Riding of Yorkshire, England
- Coordinates: 53°44′39″N 0°53′34″W
- Year built: Early or mid-17th century
- Renovated: Early 21st century (restored)

Listed Building – Grade II*
- Official name: Knedlington Old Hall
- Designated: 16 December 1966
- Reference no.: 1083235

Knedlington Old Hall is a historic building on Main Street in Knedlington, a hamlet in the East Riding of Yorkshire, England.

The house was built in the early or mid 17th century. Nikolaus Pevsner described it as "the finest small manor house in the East Riding", and it was Grade II* listed in 1966. It was restored in the early 21st century, and in 2016 it was described as having "an entrance hall, cloakroom, office, drawing room, dining room, kitchen, scullery, five bedrooms, three bathrooms and attics".

The house is built of brick on a plinth, with stone dressings, quoins and a pantile roof. It has a square plan, and consists of two parallel range and a third range at right angles at the rear. The front facing the road has three storeys and two bays. Each bay has a decorative stepped and ogee-shaped gable with finials and shaped kneelers, the left gable containing a sundial. Below are mullioned windows and moulded string courses. On the left return is a doorway with a Tudor arch, and the right return has a modern doorway. Inside, the main reception room has early 18th-century panelling and plasterwork, including a large chimneypiece, and also has 17th-century stained glass depicting a coat of arms.

== See also ==
- Grade II* listed buildings in the East Riding of Yorkshire
- Listed buildings in Asselby
