= Asselby =

Village and civil parish in the East Riding of Yorkshire, England

Coordinates: 53.744119°N 0.912954°W

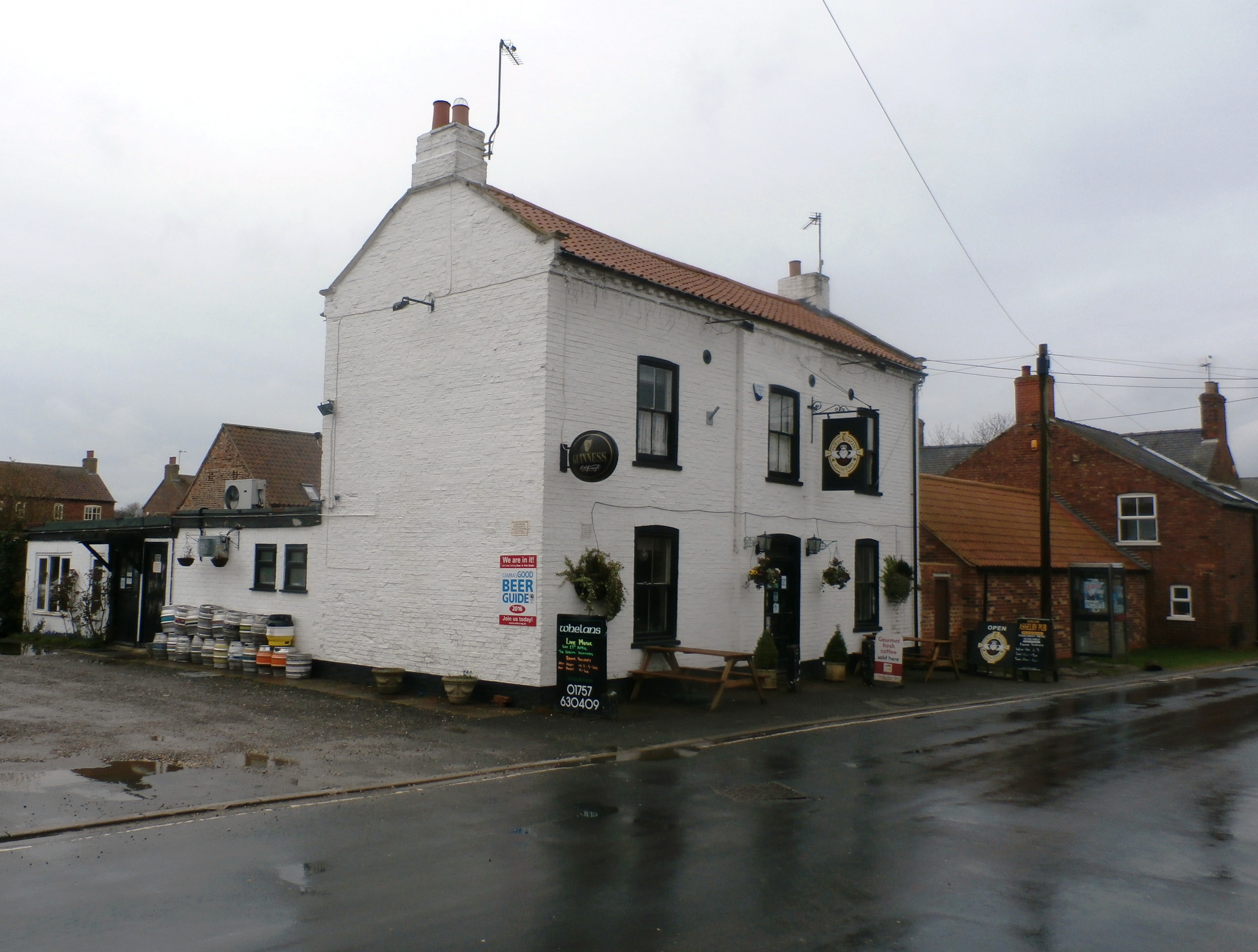
- The Black Swan

- Location within the East Riding of Yorkshire
- Population: 351 (2011 census)
- OS grid reference: SE717280
  - London: 155 mi (249 km) S
- Civil parish: Asselby
- Unitary authority: East Riding of Yorkshire
- Ceremonial county: East Riding of Yorkshire
- Region: Yorkshire and the Humber
- Country: England
- Sovereign state: United Kingdom
- Post town: GOOLE
- Postcode district: DN14
- Dialling code: 01757
- Police: Humberside
- Fire: Humberside
- Ambulance: Yorkshire
- UK Parliament: Goole and Pocklington

Asselby is a village and civil parish in the East Riding of Yorkshire, England. It is located in the south-west of the county, north of the River Ouse. It is situated approximately 2 miles (3.2 km) west of the market town of Howden. The land surrounding Asselby is very flat and intersected by dykes which drain into the Rivers Derwent and Ouse.

== History ==
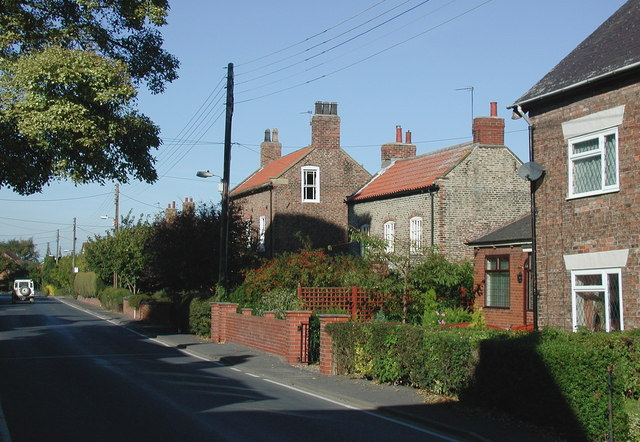
Main Street, Asselby

Asselby is mentioned in the Domesday Book as belonging to Cuthbert, the Bishop of Durham. The name derives from Old Norse - the By of Askil, meaning the farmstead of Askil. Historically in the wapentake of Howdenshire, and in the Parish of Howden, it is now in its own civil parish. The civil parish is formed by the village of Asselby and the hamlet of Knedlington, together with that part of Boothferry village west of the B1228 road. According to the 2011 UK census, Asselby parish had a population of 351, a rise from the 2001 UK census figure of 299. The parish covers an area of 532.14 hectares (1,314.9 acres).

The Hull and Barnsley Railway ran past the village until 1955, having a level crossing named 'Asselby'. The closest station was Barmby railway station.

The village has one pub, The Black Swan, situated on Main Street. Unusually, Asselby is situated on an entirely dead-end road, which finishes in the next village (which is slightly larger than Asselby), Barmby on the Marsh.

Northern Gas Networks has a gas pressure reduction and odourisation plant just outside of Asselby.

== Asselby Island ==
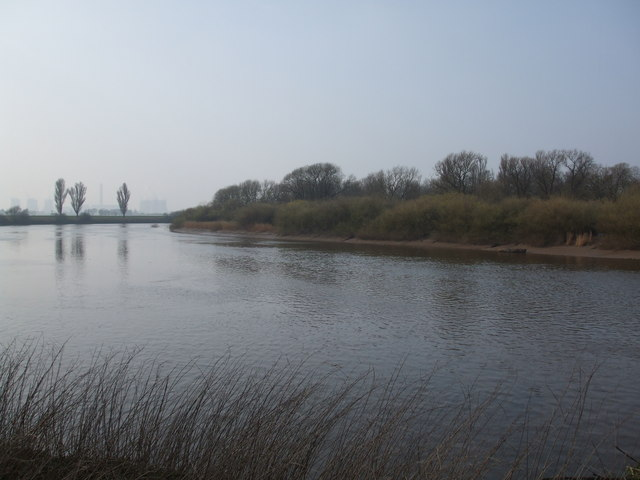
The River Ouse and Asselby island

South of the village, on the banks of the River Ouse is Asselby Island. The island is now a triangular patch of land which covers some 50.07 acres (20.26 ha), however it used to only be 10 acres (4 ha) and had water surrounding it on all sides. Changes in the tidal system meant that the northern channel had almost dried up by the 1940s, and draining by the Ministry of Agriculture, Fisheries and Food, in the 1960s, mean that the island now only has water on the western and southern sides, its northern side being now permanently joined to the northern bank of the river. However, in times of high water, the island does become a true island again.

The island is now wooded (mostly willow trees) and is only 20 feet (6 m) above sea level. It is opposite the mouth of the River Aire, and is 3.5 miles (5.6 km) downstream from the present mouth of the River Derwent. The island is now a Site of Interest for Nature Conservation (SINC), particularly for invertebrates. Historically, the island belonged to the Parish of Drax, but it now belongs entirely with the civil parish of Asselby. The Trans-Pennine Trail on the northern bank of the Ouse affords views of the island.

== See also ==
- Listed buildings in Asselby
