= Howden rail accident =

1840 railway incident in England

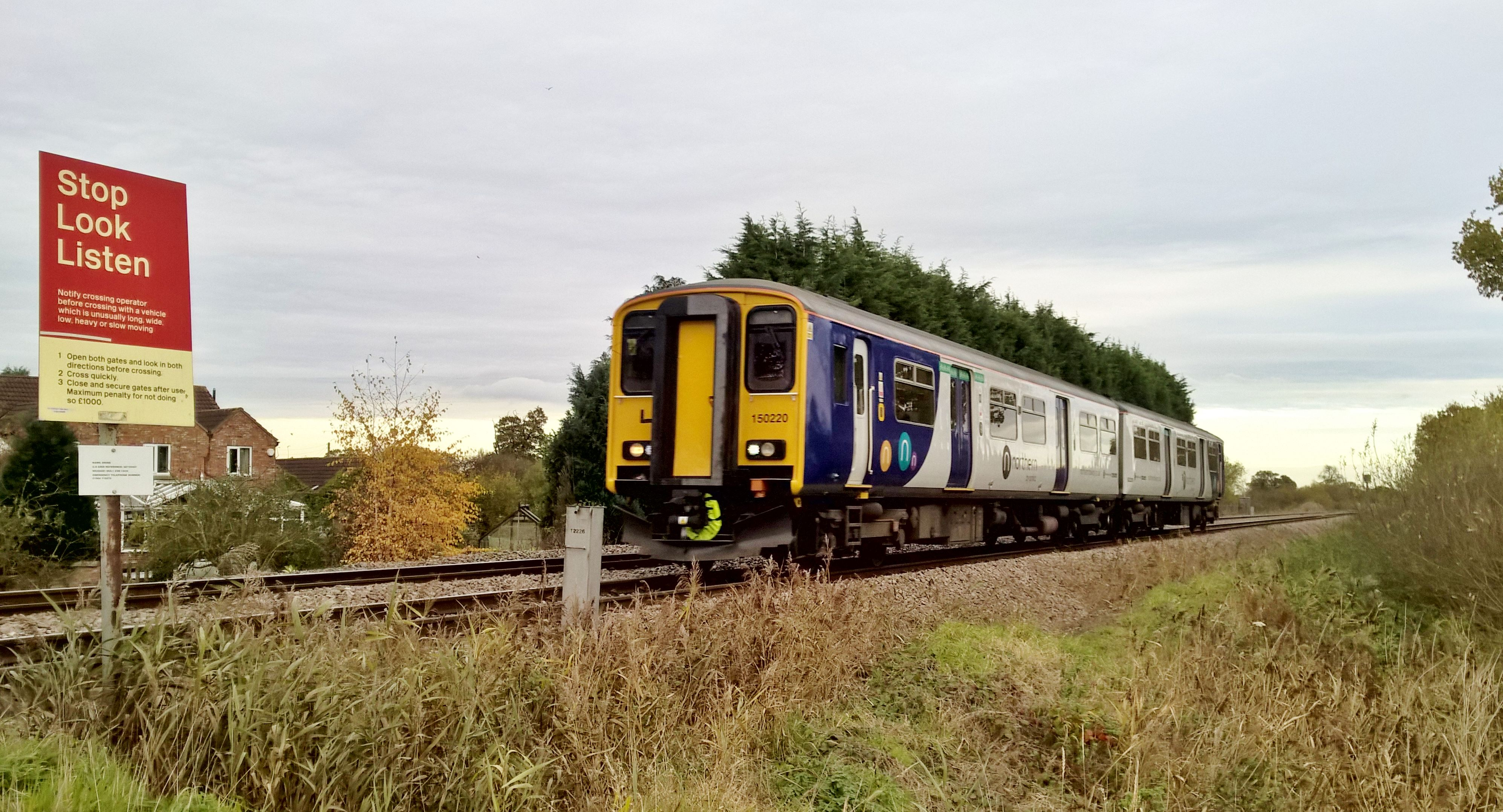
- Looking east from Brind level crossing towards the site of the accident.

Details
- Date: 7 August 1840
- Location: Howden, Yorkshire
- Coordinates: 53.76681°N 0.87632°W
- Country: England, UK
- Line: Hull and Selby Railway
- Cause: Inadequately secured load

Statistics
- Trains: 1
- Deaths: 5
- Injured: 9+
- Damage: 1 train

The Howden rail accident in Yorkshire on 7 August 1840 killed five passengers. It occurred when a large piece of cargo, cast iron, fell from a wagon and derailed the following carriages. It happened on the Hull and Selby Railway as the train was travelling from Leeds to Hull. The crash was one of the first railway accidents to be investigated by the Railway Inspectorate. One of the worst accidents to have occurred on the new UK rail network, it was also a new phenomenon for the public; shipwrecks and coal mining accidents were more frequent.

== Investigation ==
Sir Frederick Smith, the first head of the Railway Inspectorate (his formal job title was "Inspector-General of Railways") found that the casting had been insecurely lashed to the wagon, and was unstable for carrying by train. The casting was part of a weighing machine intended to be used at Hull Station, and itself weighed about 2.5 long tons (2.8 short tons). It measured 12 feet 6.75 inches (3.83 m) by 5 feet 7 inches (1.70 m), and since the wagon was only 10 feet (3.0 m) by 7 feet 6 inches (2.29 m), it must have overhung the wagon when being carried. The casting fell from the wagon onto the rails when the train was about 3/4 mile (1.2 km) from Howden station.

Since the wagon was just behind the tender, the following passenger carriages were derailed. The first five carriages were empty, but the sixth carriage held several passengers, some of whom were fatally injured. Smith's report gave the total number of dead as four, but contemporary newspapers reported two separate inquests; one upon three people killed instantly, another upon two who died subsequently of their injuries.

The inspector interviewed railway staff involved directly (driver and guard) as well as many others involved in loading the casting, or had seen the casting on its wagon before the accident. The railway staff all either asserted that the casting had been lashed to the wagon or said they could not remember one way or the other. Smith however noted:

A very respectable civil engineer, whom I met when engaged in the examination of the competing lines of railway to Scotland, acquainted me that he had travelled by the train to which the accident happened on the 7th of August, and was in the carriage with the persons who were unfortunately killed. This gentleman is of opinion, from observations he made at the time, that the casting was not lashed; but I do not think it right to press this negative evidence against the positive assertions of the persons whose statements I have given above, although it appears to me entitled to every consideration

If the casting had been lashed on to the wagon, clearly it had not been done adequately since the ropes apparently used had chafed through owing to movement of the casting on the wagon:

Had the castings been properly secured by chains, ropes, or wood framing, the accident of the 7th of August would not have happened, and it is quite clear that there was great and unpardonable neglect in the parties whose business it was to attend to such matters at Selby, for it behoved them not only to see that the casting in question was lashed, but that it was secured beyond the possibility of accident. The truck on which the casting was placed had a flush floor, with the exception of a small ledge round the sides and ends; and therefore as it was on the lashing alone that the safety of the passengers depended, it is evident that proper precautions were not taken in this instance; indeed, I am given to understand that the large casting was supported on the smaller pieces of iron-work which were lying loose on the floor of the truck.

Smith recommended that goods should only be carried where they were secure, and wagons should be fitted with a frame to enclose large items, to prevent their falling off. He also recommended that the foreman of the goods department should personally inspect goods wagons to ensure their security and safety, and confirm in writing that he had done so.
