= Listed buildings in Asselby =

Asselby is a civil parish in the county of the East Riding of Yorkshire, England. It contains twelve listed buildings that are recorded in the National Heritage List for England. Of these, one is listed at Grade II*, the middle of the three grades, and the others are at Grade II, the lowest grade. The parish contains the village of Asselby, the hamlet of Knedlington, and the surrounding countryside. The listed buildings consist of houses and associated structures, farmhouses and farm buildings, a public house and a former chapel.

== Key ==
Grade	Criteria
II*	Particularly important buildings of more than special interest
II	Buildings of national importance and special interest

== Buildings ==
Name and location	Photograph	Date	Notes	Grade
Booth Farmhouse; 53.72836°N 0.89355°W		Mid-17th century	The farmhouse is brick, and has a pantile roof with raised gable ends and shaped kneelers. There are two storeys and five bays. Projecting from the fourth bay is a two-storey porch with a pediment. It contains a round-arched doorway with imposts and a floating cornice in moulded brick. The windows are sashes under segmental arches; the window above the doorway is horizontally sliding.	II
Knedlington Old Hall; 53.74409°N 0.89281°W		Mid-17th century	The house is in brick on a plinth, with stone dressings, quoins and a pantile roof. It has a square plan, and consists of two parallel range and a third range at right angles at the rear. The front facing the road has three storeys and two bays. Each bay has a decorative stepped and ogee-shaped gable with finials and shaped kneelers, the left gable containing a sundial. Below are mullioned windows and moulded string courses. On the left return is a doorway with a Tudor arch, and the right return has a modern doorway.	II*
Gate piers, Knedlington Old Hall; 53.74400°N 0.89300°W	—	17th century	The gate piers are in brick with stone dressings, they have square plan, and are about 3 metres (9.8 ft) in height. Each pier has a chamfered stone base, a flat buttress on the inner face, a moulded capital, and a ball finial.	II
Aschilebi; 53.74415°N 0.91385°W	—	Mid-18th century	The house is in brick, with a floor band, a dentilled eaves course, and a pantile roof. There are two storeys and four bays. On the front is a doorway, above it is a blocked opening, and the windows are sashes. Above all the openings are segmental arches.	II
Pigeon loft, Booth Farm; 53.72861°N 0.89336°W	—	Mid-18th century	The pigeon loft is in brick with an eaves band and a pantile roof. There are two storeys and one bay. On the ground floor are a round-arched doorway and a window with an elliptical arch. The upper floor has an elliptical-arched opening, and inside it are nesting boxes.	II
Stable and granary, Booth Farm; 53.72854°N 0.89327°W	—	Mid-18th century	The building is in brick, with an eaves band, and a pantile roof with gable coping and shaped kneelers. There is a single storey with an attic, and five bays. The building contains stable doors and fixed windows, all under elliptical arches. On the right gable end are external stone steps.	II
Knedlington House, wall and gates 53.74356°N 0.88783°W		Late 18th century	The house is in colourwashed brick on a plinth, with stone dressings, a floor band, a stepped eaves course, and a pantile roof. There are two storeys, three bays, outshuts and a rear cross-wing. The central doorway has a Doric doorcase with attached columns, and a radial fanlight. The windows are sashes with channelled wedge lintels and fluted keystones. On the cross-wing is a round-arched stair window. The garden wall is in stuccoed brick with stone coping, and the carriage gates are in cast iron. The gate piers are round and fluted, and have ball finials.	II
Farm buildings north of Knedlington Old Hall; 53.74423°N 0.89293°W	—	Late 18th century	The farm buildings consist of loose boxes, a hayloft and a pigeoncote. They are in brick, and have a pantile roof with raised gables and brick kneelers. There are two storeys and three sections, the middle section higher with pigeon openings on the upper storey. The other openings include segmental arches, windows, some with segmental heads, and rectangular vents, and there is a blocked pitching window.	II
Linton House; 53.74389°N 0.91188°W	—	Late 18th century	The house is in brick, with a stepped eaves course, and a pantile roof with coped gables and shaped kneelers. There are two storeys, three bays, and a rear cross-wing. The central doorway has a fanlight and the windows are fixed. All the openings have segmental brick arches.	II
The Black Swan; 53.74376°N 0.91241°W		Late 18th century	The public house is in painted brick, with a dentilled eaves course, and a pantile roof with coped gables and brick kneelers. There are two storeys and three bays, the middle bay projecting slightly. The central doorway has a fanlight, the windows are sashes, and all the openings are under segmental arches.	II
East End Farmhouse (west); 53.74384°N 0.91135°W	—	Late 18th to early 19th century	The house is in brown brick, with red brick dressings, quoins, a floor band, a dentilled eaves course, and a pantile roof with gable coping and shaped kneelers. There are two storeys, three bays and a rear cross-wing. The central doorway has a fanlight, the windows are sashes with vertical side lights, and all the openings have quoined surrounds and flat rubbed brick arches.	II
The Old Sunday School; 53.74417°N 0.91242°W	—	1810	Originally a chapel, and later used for other purposes, it is in gault brick with stepped eaves and a pyramidal pantile roof. There is a square plan, and it has a single storey. On the front is a doorway with a divided fanlight and a segmental arch, flanked by windows with pointed arches.	II
