= Listed buildings in Barmby on the Marsh =

Barmby on the Marsh is a civil parish in the county of the East Riding of Yorkshire, England. It contains ten listed buildings that are recorded in the National Heritage List for England. All the listed buildings are designated at Grade II, the lowest of the three grades, which is applied to "buildings of national importance and special interest". The parish contains the village of Barmby on the Marsh and the surrounding area. All the listed buildings are in the village, and consist of houses, famhouses and associated structures, a church and a gravestone in the churchyard, and a former school.

== Buildings ==
Name and location	Photograph	Date	Notes
East End Farmhouse; 53.74853°N 0.95316°W	—	Mid-18th century	The house is in brown brick with red brick dressings, quoins, a floor band, a stepped eaves course, and a pantile roof with a raised coped gable on the left. The doorway has a rectangular fanlight, above it is a blind window, the other windows are sashes, and all the openings have quoined surrounds.
South View and wall 53.75050°N 0.95998°W	—	Mid to late 18th century	The house is in brick, with a floor band, a stepped eaves course, and a pantile roof with gable coping and shaped kneelers. There are two storeys and three bays, and a rear cross-wing. The central doorway has pilasters, a fanlight, a frieze with urns and paterae, and a dentilled pediment. The windows are sashes, and in front of the garden is a low coped wall, ramped at the ends.
Gravestone; 53.74780°N 0.95503°W	—	1768	The gravestone is in the churchyard of St Helen's Church, to the north of the church. It consists of a stone slab about 1.3 metres (4 ft 3 in) in height and 0.75 metres (2 ft 6 in) in width with a carved upper edge. It has an inscription under an incised round arch with a keystone and imposts.
St Helen's Church; 53.74769°N 0.95493°W		1773	The tower dates from the 18th century, and the chancel was added in 1870. The church consists of a nave, north and south porches, a chancel, and a west tower. The nave and chancel are in limestone, the nave has a Welsh slate roof, and the chancel has a tile roof. The tower is in brick with a domed ogee roof in copper. There are three stages, bands, a south door, a fixed west window, bell openings in each side, and dentilled eaves; all the openings have segmental arches. The porches have round-arched doorways and keystones, and the south porch also has imposts.
Bankfield Farmhouse; 53.74928°N 0.95672°W	—	Late 18th century	The house is in brick, with a floor band, dentilled eaves, and a hipped pantile roof. There are two storeys and five bays, the middle three bays projecting slightly. The doorway is in the centre, the windows are sashes, and all the openings are under a cambered brick arch.
Dunstall House; 53.74873°N 0.95439°W	—	Late 18th century	The house is in brick, with a whitewashed floor band, a dentilled eaves band, and French tile roof with gable coping and shaped kneelers. There are two storeys, three bays, and a rear cross-wing. The doorway has a rectangulr fanlight, the windows are sashes, and all the openings have wedge lintels and keystones.
Fox Farmhouse; 53.74883°N 0.95639°W	—	Late 18th century	The house is in brown brick, with red brick dressings, a colourwashed floor band, a coved eaves course, and a Welsh slate roof with gable coping and shaped kneelers. There are two storeys, three bays, and a rear cross-wing. The doorway has a fanlight, the windows are sashes, and all the openings have colourwashed flat brick arches.
Rosemount; 53.74892°N 0.95541°W	—	Late 18th century	The house is in brick, and has a plain coped parapet, and a Welsh slate with gable coping and shaped kneelers at the rear. There are three storeys, three bays, the middle bay projecting slightly, and a rear cross-wing. The central doorway has a decorative fanlight and a pediment. The windows are sashes with wedge lintels, those on the top floor are blocked.
Hawthorne House; 53.74895°N 0.95562°W	—	Early 19th century	The house is in brick, and has a pantile roof with coped gables. There are two storeys, two parallel ranges, and a front of three bays. The central doorway has pilasters, a radial fanlight, a doorcase decorated with swags and urns, and a dentilled pediment. It is flanked by canted bay windows. The upper floor contains sash windows, the middle one with a single light, the outer ones tripartite, and all have wedge lintels.
Former National School; 53.74805°N 0.95495°W		1834	The school, later used for other purposes, is in brown brick, and has a pantile roof with gable coping ending in cylindrical blocks. There is a single storey and three bays, and an additional gabled entrance bay on the right containing a round-headed doorway. The windows have pointed heads and Y-tracery. On the gable end is an inscribed and dated plaque.
