= Barmby on the Marsh =

Village and civil parish in the East Riding of Yorkshire, England

Coordinates: 53.749°N 0.956°W

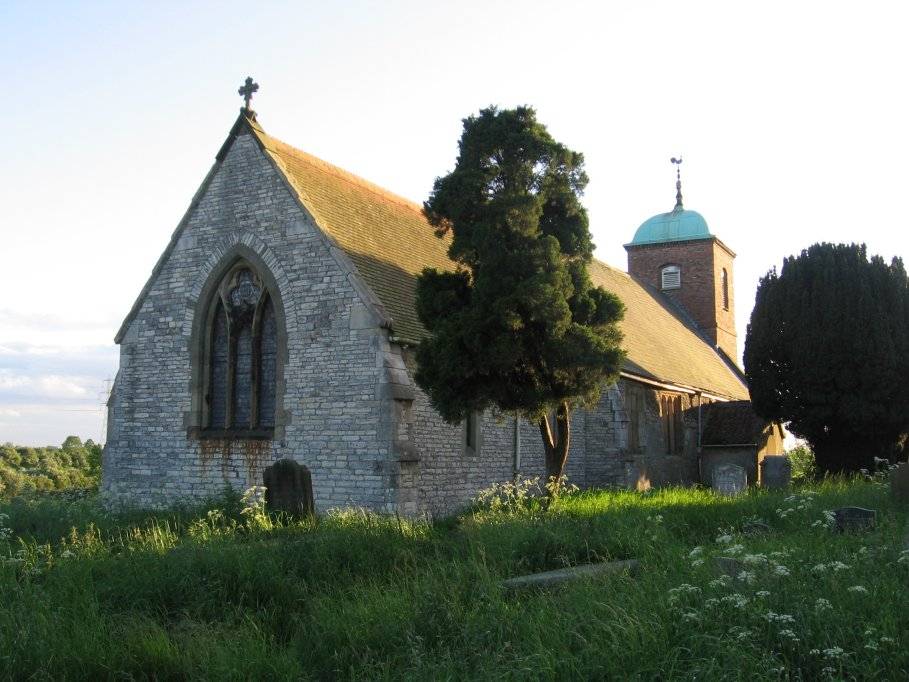
- St Helens church

- Location within the East Riding of Yorkshire
- Population: 372 (2011 census)
- OS grid reference: SE688285
  - London: 155 mi (249 km) S
- Civil parish: Barmby on the Marsh
- Unitary authority: East Riding of Yorkshire
- Ceremonial county: East Riding of Yorkshire
- Region: Yorkshire and the Humber
- Country: England
- Sovereign state: United Kingdom
- Post town: GOOLE
- Postcode district: DN14
- Dialling code: 01757
- Police: Humberside
- Fire: Humberside
- Ambulance: Yorkshire
- UK Parliament: Goole and Pocklington

Barmby on the Marsh is a village and civil parish in the East Riding of Yorkshire, England. It lies about 4 miles (6.4 km) west of the market town of Howden. It lies on the east bank of the River Ouse (and across it to North Yorkshire), near its confluence with the River Derwent.

According to the 2011 UK census, Barmby on the Marsh parish had a population of 372, an increase on the 2001 UK census figure of 345.

== History ==
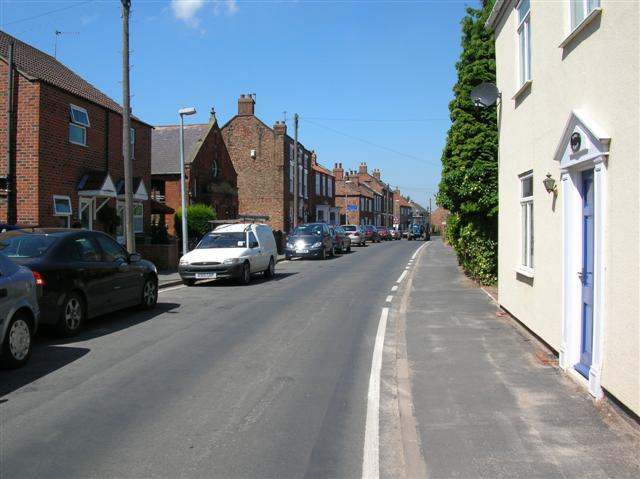
High Street

The name Barmby derives from the Old Norse bjarnibȳ or barnebȳ meaning 'Bjarni's' or 'Barne's village'. Perhaps, it could also derives from barnbȳ meaning 'child's village'.

The parish church of St Helen is a Grade II listed building. Now no longer active, it is currently under the care of the Friends of Friendless Churches charity. The village also has a Methodist chapel, located on High Street.

The village was served by a pub, the Kings Head, but this is now Lorenzo's Italian restaurant. There was another pub that served the village, the Sloop Inn which was located at the western end of the village beside the River Derwent, although this closed some decades ago.

Barmby lies at the end of a long dead end road, on which also lies the village of Asselby. At the end of the road is the Barmby on the Marsh Wetlands, a nature reserve at the confluence of the rivers Derwent and River Ouse.

The local primary school is located at the western entrance to the village.

Barmby was served by Barmby railway station on the Hull and Barnsley Railway between 1885 and 1955.

== See also ==
- Listed buildings in Barmby on the Marsh
