= Listed buildings in Howden =

Howden is a civil parish in the county of the East Riding of Yorkshire, England. It contains 65 listed buildings that are recorded in the National Heritage List for England. Of these, one is listed at Grade I, the highest of the three grades, three are at Grade II*, the middle grade, and the others are at Grade II, the lowest grade. The parish contains the market town of Howden and the surrounding countryside. Most of the listed buildings are houses and associated structures, and the others include shops, public houses, two churches, the remaining part of the manor house of the Bishops of Durham and associated buildings, a market cross, a former tower windmill, a former pumping mill, a former railway station and signal box, a former police station and lock-up, a market hall, a war memorial and a telephone kiosk.

== Key ==
Grade	Criteria
I	Buildings of exceptional interest, sometimes considered to be internationally important
II*	Particularly important buildings of more than special interest
II	Buildings of national importance and special interest

== Buildings ==
Name and location	Photograph	Date	Notes	Grade
Howden Minster; 53.74533°N 0.86738°W		c. 1270–75	Originally a Collegiate church, it has been altered and extended through the centuries, and is partly ruinous. It is built in magnesian limestone with roofs of copper and timber. The church consists of a nave with a clerestory, north and south aisles, a grammar school and a porch on the south, north and south transepts, both with an east chapel, a tower at the crossing, a choir with aisles, a chapter house, and a passage linking with a vestry. The tower has two stages, an octagonal stair turret in the northwest angle, gabled buttresses, transomed windows, a string course, and an embattled parapet. The choir and the chapter house are in ruins. At the west end are four hexagonal pierced turrets with crocketed spirelets.	I
The Bishop's Manor; 53.74467°N 0.86608°W		1388–1405	The surviving great hall and porch of the manor house of the Bishops of Durham. It is in magnesian limestone and brick, and has a hipped Welsh slate roof. The north front has two storeys and seven bays, and a projecting porch on the right. It mainly has a moulded plinth, and there are two floor bands. The doorway has a divided fanlight and a bracketed cornice, and the windows are sashes. The porch has two storeys, a stepped chamfered plinth, and a projecting embattled parapet with a central niche surmounted by a pair of dogs, and containing a figure holding a shield. It contains a wide round archway above which is two-light window. The south front has tall buttresses, and a medieval pointed doorway.	II*
Market Cross; 53.74535°N 0.86614°W		Medieval	The cross, which stands in Market Place, has a medieval base, and rest of the cross was added in 1909. It is in stone and about 5 metres (16 ft) in height. There is a circular base of three steps, on which is a square modern base, a shaft with a square section and a moulded capital and a foliated cross. On the base is a cast iron plaque with an inscription.	II
The Fruit House; 53.74387°N 0.86627°W		Early 15th century	Probably originally a gatehouse, with later alterations and additions, particularly in the 20th century. It is in stone and brick, with a single storey and a single bay, and it contains a pointed arch over a river. Above the arch is a string course, a coped gable with letters in relief, surmounted by a bellcote, and flanked by round embattled turrets. On the building are two inscribed plaques.	II
The Langley Archway; 53.74465°N 0.86681°W	—	Early 15th century	The archway is in brick with stone dressings, two storeys and two bays. It contains a four-centred arch with two moulded orders in a square-headed frame, over which is a stepped string course. Above this is an angel carrying a coat of arms, flanked by two windows with trefoil-cusped heads, and above is a fragmentary coved course.	II*
The Old Courthouse; 53.74458°N 0.86695°W	—	15th or 16th century	The building is in stone with some repairs in brick, stone dressings, fragments of a chamfered plinth, and a pantile roof. There is a single storey and five bays. On the front and on the south gable end are doorways with a moulded basket arch on chamfered jambs, and windows.	II
26 Market Place; 53.74564°N 0.86631°W	—	Late 17th century	A shop in rendered brick, with a steeply pitched pantile roof. There are three storeys and two bays. On the ground floor is an early 20th-century shopfront, with a central doorway, pilasters, impost blocks, a frieze, and a cornice on consoles. The upper floors contain sash windows. Inside, there is vestigial timber framing.	II
Howden Hall; 53.74778°N 0.86279°W		Late 17th century	A house that has been altered, it is in rendered brick, with rusticated quoins, overhanging modillion eaves courses, roofs of Westmorland slate and pantile, and two storeys. The south front has four bays, a floor band, and a hipped roof. On the front is a Doric porch with a pediment, and a doorway with a divided fanlight. The east front has seven bays, it contains a central two-storey canted bay window with a pyramidal roof, and there is an additional single-storey bay on the right. Most of the windows are sashes.	II*
2 and 4 Pinfold Street; 53.74529°N 0.86842°W		Late 17th to early 18th century	At one time an inn, later a house divided into two, it is in rendered brick on a deep plinth, with a dentilled eaves course, and a swept pantile roof with raised gable ends. There are two storeys and three bays. The two doorways have rectangular divided fanlights, and the windows are sashes.	II
Highbridge House; 53.74530°N 0.86495°W		Early 18th century	A house that has been much altered and used for a variety of purposes, it is rendered, with stone dressings, rusticated quoins, deep bracketed eaves and a hipped Welsh slate roof. There are two storeys and seven bays, the middle three bays projecting. The middle section contains a blind panel flanked by doorway with fanlights. On the outer bays are canted bay windows, and above all the ground floor is a canopy. In the centre of the upper floor is a fragment of a segmental pediment, above which is a sash window in an eared architrave, and the outer bays contain four sash windows with plain surrounds.	II
38, 42 and 44 Bridgegate; 53.74649°N 0.86569°W		Mid-18th century	A terrace of houses and shops in brick on a plinth, with floor bands, sprocketed eaves and a pantile roof with gable coping and stone kneelers. There are three storeys and nine bays. The left part has a shopfront and a doorway on the left, the middle part has a doorway on the left bay, and the right part has a central doorway and a shop window to its left. The doorways are approached by steps and all have a rectangular fanlight. The windows are sashes, and all the doorways and windows have rubbed brick flat arches with whitewashed keystones.	II
46 Hailgate; 53.74677°N 0.86335°W	—	Mid-18th century	The house is in colourwashed brick, and has a steeply pitched pantile roof with a raised gable end on the right. There are two storeys and three bays. The doorway has a rectangular fanlight, above it is a blocked window, and the other windows are 20th-century fixed windows with wedge lintels.	II
75 and 77 Hailgate; 53.74492°N 0.86498°W	—	Mid-18th century	A house, later divided into two, in orange-brown brick, with dressings in orange brick, quoins, floor bands, a stepped and dentiled brick eaves cornice, and a hipped pantile roof. There are three storeys and five bays. The ground floor has two doorways with fanlights and segmental heads, flanked by square bay windows. On the extreme left is a round-arched passage doorway. On the two right bays of the upper floors are sash windows, the left three bays contain modern casement windows, and all the windows are in architraves under rubbed brick flat arches with keystones.	II
6 and 6A Market Place; 53.74601°N 0.86601°W	—	Mid-18th century	A house, later shops, it is stuccoed, and has a broad moulded timber cornice, and a Welsh slate roof, hipped on the left. There are two storeys and five bays. On the ground floor is a 19th-century shopfront with a recessed doorway and a frieze on a carved console extending to the right over a doorway with panelled reveals, a fanlight and consoles. Further to the right are two sash windows. The upper floor has sash windows under channelled wedge lintels.	II
4 Parson's Green; 53.74500°N 0.86826°W		Mid-18th century	The house is in red brick, it was refronted in yellow brick in the 19th century, and has a floor band, stepped eaves, and a pantile roof with gable coping and shaped kneelers. There are two storeys, three bays, and an earlier rear cross-wing. The central doorway has panelled reveals, mouldings in sunken panels, a rectangular fanlight, star motifs in the corners, and a cornice. The windows are sashes with painted flat brick arches.	II
14 Saint John's Street; 53.74567°N 0.86910°W		Mid-18th century	The house is in brick on a plinth, with a stepped eaves course, sprocketed eaves, and a steeply pitched pantile roof. There are two storeys, three bays, and a later rear cross-wing. The central doorway has panelled jambs and reveals, a rectangular fanlight, impost blocks on acanthus consoles, a panelled frieze and a cornice. The windows are sashes, those on the outer bays tripartite.	II
1 Vicar Lane; 53.74592°N 0.86635°W	—	Mid-18th century	A house, later a shop and a house, in stuccoed brick, with a moulded cornice, a high parapet and a pantile roof. There are two storeys and three bays. On the ground floor is a 19th-century shopfront with a central doorway, and to its left is a doorway, both with a rectangular fanlight. Above are decorative consoles carrying impost blocks and a continuous plain frieze. The upper floor contains sash windows.	II
Barnhill Hall; 53.75097°N 0.88784°W	—	Mid-18th century	The house is in brick, with a dentilled eaves course, and a pantile roof with raised gable ends. There are two storeys and three bays, and at the rear are a cross-wing and two outshuts. The doorway has a fanlight, and the windows are horizontally sliding sashes, those on the ground floor with segmental arches, and those on the upper floor with timber lintels.	II
Bridgegate House; 53.74693°N 0.86535°W		Mid-18th century	The house is in brick, with a floor band, a parapet with moulded stone coping, and a pantile roof with raised gable ends. There are two storeys, a main range of six bays, a recessed bay on the left, and a parallel rear range. The doorway has a rectangular fanlight, and the windows are sashes with wedge lintels.	II
Garden wall, Howden Hall; 53.74765°N 0.86245°W		18th century	The wall enclosing the garden to the south of the house is in red brick with flat copings. It is about 3 metres (9.8 ft) in height, and extends for about 75 metres (246 ft). The wall contains three round-arched doorways with pilasters and architraves, the middle doorway flanked by rectangular panels.	II
12 Bridgegate; 53.74722°N 0.86381°W	—	Mid to late 18th century	The house is in brown brick, with floor bands and a coped parapet, stepped on the right return. There are three storeys and three bays. The doorway on the right has a rectangular fanlight and a segmental head, and to its left is a canted bay window. The upper floors contain sash windows, those on the top floor horizontally sliding, and all are under segmental heads.	II
27 Market Place; 53.74570°N 0.86633°W	—	Mid to late 18th century	A house, later a house and a shop, it is rendered, and has a floor band, a modillion wooden eaves board, and a roof with gable coping and a shaped kneeler on the left. There are three storeys and three bays. On the ground flor is an early 20th-century shopfront with carved consoles, impost blocks, a plain frieze, a cornice and a hood. The middle floor contains sash windows, on the top floor are centrally-pivoted 20th-century windows, and all the windows have cambered arches and keystones.	II
7 Bridgegate; 53.74735°N 0.86389°W	—	Late 18th century	The house is in brick, with a floor band, a dentilled eaves cornice, and a French tile roof with gable coping and kneelers. There are two storeys, two parallel ranges, and a front of three bays. The central doorway has a reeded surround, a rectangular fanlight, a frieze, and a cornice with pendants. This is flanked by canted bay windows, and on the upper floor are sash windows with wedge lintels. On the right return is a massive chimney stack.	II
58 Bridgegate; 53.74589°N 0.86752°W	—	Late 18th century	A house, later a shop, in brick, partly rendered, with a dentilled eaves course, and a pantile roof raised on the left gable end. There are three storeys and three bays. On the ground floor is a shopfront in 19th-century style, to its right is a sash window, and further to the right is a double door. The upper floors contain sash windows with soldier arches.	II
60 and 62 Bridgegate; 53.74582°N 0.86764°W	—	Late 18th century	A house, later partly used for other purposes, in brick, with quoins, a dentiled eaves course, and a pantile roof with gable coping and kneelers. There are three storeys and three bays. On the left is a shopfront with pilasters, a frieze and a cornice on brackets, containing two doorways with rectangular fanlights. To its right and on the upper floors are sash windows with flat brick arches.	II
48 and 48A Hailgate; 53.74674°N 0.86351°W	—	Late 18th century	A house divided into two, in brick, with a decorative eaves course, and a Welsh slate roof with gable coping and shaped kneelers. There are two storeys and three bays, the middle bay projecting slightly. In the centre is a doorway with pilasters, a radial fanlight and an open pediment on consoles. To the extreme left is a later doorway with a rectangular fanlight. The windows are sashes, tripartite on the ground floor, all with painted rubbed brick flat arches.	II
85 Hailgate; 53.74455°N 0.86481°W	—	Late 18th century	The house is in stuccoed brick on a stone plinth, with a floor band, a coped parapet, and a pantile roof with gable coping. There are two storeys and three bays. The central doorway has a reeded surround, panelled reveals, a rectangular fanlight, and a cornice on brackets, and the windows are sashes.	II
1–5 High Bridge; 53.74521°N 0.86593°W	—	Late 18th century	A row of shops with flats above, in pale orange-brown brick, with dressings in orange brick and stone, quoins, a floor band, and a Welsh slate roof with a stone coped gable and a shaped kneeler on the left. There are two storeys, a double depth plan, and six bays. On the ground floor are shopfronts of various ages, and a basket-arched passage entrance. The upper floors contain sash windows, those on the left two bays with channelled wedge lintels and fluted keystones, and on the other bays with rubbed brick flat arches.	II
32 and 32A Market Place; 53.74604°N 0.86626°W	—	Late 18th century	A shop with a dwelling above, it is stuccoed, and has rusticated quoins, a moulded cornice, and a slate roof. There are three storeys and two bays. The ground floor contains a 20th-century shopfront flanked by doorways with fanlights, on the middle floor are sash windows, and the top floor has fixed windows.	II
3 Saint John's Street; 53.74561°N 0.86833°W		Late 18th century	The house is in brick on a plinth, with floor bands, a dentilled eaves course, and a tile roof with raised gable ends and brick kneelers. There are three storeys and two bays. The doorway on the left has pilasters, a radial fanlight, and an open pediment on consoles with paterae. To the right and on the upper floors are sash windows with wedge lintels.	II
The Round House; 53.74255°N 0.87967°W	—	Late 18th century	A summer house, later a private house, in brick, with dressings in brick and stone, a floor band, a modillion eaves course, and a hipped Welsh slate roof. It has an octagonal plan and two storeys. On the north front is a casement window, and the upper floor contains a round-arched sash window flanked by blind round-arched panels with an impost band and gauged brick arches.	II
The former White Horse Inn; 53.74578°N 0.86606°W		Late 18th century	The former public house is stuccoed on the ground floor and in rendered brick above, with a floor band, a dentilled eaves course, and a hipped Welsh slate roof. There are three storeys and four bays. The doorway has a rectangular fanlight, the windows on the lower two floors are sashes, and on the top floor they are casements. At the rear is a double gable and a round-headed stair window.	II
3 Vicar Lane; 53.74586°N 0.86645°W	—	1793	Two houses and a shop, later one house, it is in stuccoed brick with a pantile roof. There are two storeys and four bays. On the outer parts are two doorways with rectangular fanlights, and the windows are sashes, those on the ground floor in moulded architraves.	II
100 and 102 Hailgate; 53.74469°N 0.86519°W	—	c. 1800	A pair of houses in brown brick, with red brick dressings, quoins, a floor band, paired eaves gutter brackets, and a pantile roof with gable coping and a shaped kneeler on the right. On the front are paired doorways with rectangular fanlights and radial glazing. These are flanked by bow windows with cornices, and friezes with drop pendants. The upper floor contains sash windows; these and the doorways have channelled wedge lintels and keystones.	II
The Chestnuts; 53.74491°N 0.86908°W		c. 1800	The house is in brick, with stone dressings, a floor band, a modillion eaves course, and a hipped Westmorland slate roof. There are two storeys and five bays, the middle bay projecting, and containing a Tuscan porch and a doorway with a fanlight. The windows are sashes with flat brick arches.	II
Coach house, 16 Pinfold Street; 53.74488°N 0.86868°W		c. 1800	The coach house, later a garage, is in brick, and has a pantile roof with gable coping. The central section has two storeys, three bays, and a pediment containing an oculus. On the ground floor is a garage door and above are three windows, all under flat brick arches. The central section is flanked by lower recessed two-storey wings with lean-to roofs.	II
64 Bridgegate; 53.74577°N 0.86770°W	—	Late 18th to early 19th century	A shop in brick, with a blind coped parapet and a pantile roof. There are two storeys and one bay. The shopfront is in 19th-century style, with reeded pilasters, bow windows flanking a doorway with a fanlight, and a frieze. On the upper floor is a sash window under a flat brick arch. Inside there are remaining items from the 18th and 19th century.	II
78 Hailgate; 53.74568°N 0.86527°W		Late 18th to early 19th century	A house, later divided into flats, in brown brick, with red brick dressings, quoins, a moulded timber eaves band, and a French tile roof with gable coping and shaped kneelers. There are three storeys and three bays. The central doorway has fluted pilasters, panelled reveals, a radial fanlight, and a dentilled pediment with urns and festoons in the tympanum. The windows are sashes under ribbed brick arches.	II
8 Market Place; 53.74586°N 0.86604°W	—	Late 18th to early 19th century	A house, later used for other purposes, in brown brick, with red brick dressings, quoins, a floor band, and a pantile roof. There are three storeys and two bays. On the ground floor is a 19th-century shopfront with a central doorway, and a frieze on carved consoles. The upper floors contain sash windows under painted flat brick arches.	II
Hail Mill; 53.74015°N 0.85764°W	—	Late 18th to early 19th century	A former tower windmill, it is in tarred brick, and consists of a circular tapering tower of five storeys. On the ground floor are two entrances with square heads, and two windows. The first floor has four windows, and above are two windows on each floor; the windows have sandstone sills and segmental header arches.	II
87 Bridgegate and 2–6 Northolmby Street; 53.74578°N 0.86802°W	—	1820–40	A house and shops on a corner site, in brick, with a wooden eaves board, a roof of Welsh slate and pantile, and two storeys. On the Bridgegate front are four bays, two shopfronts on the ground floor, and above are four sash windows with channelled wedge lintels and dropped keystones. The Northolmby Street front has a main block of four bays, and a recessed bay on the right. The doorway has pilasters, a fanlight, impost blocks on brackets, a frieze and a cornice. The windows are sashes, those on the main block with channelled wedge lintels and dropped keystones; on the right bay they are horizontally sliding. In front of the right bay is a coped wall with a round-arched doorway.	II
55 and 57 Hailgate; 53.74595°N 0.86496°W	—	Early 19th century	A house, later offices, in colourwashed brick, with floor bands, and a pantile roof with gable coping and shaped kneelers. The central doorway has a reeded surround with paterae, a divided fanlight, and a hood on consoles. The windows are fixed, with two or three lights, under flat brick arches.	II
4 and 5 Market Place; 53.74614°N 0.86599°W		Early 19th century	A pair of shops with dwellings above, in brown brick, with red brick dressings, quoins, paired gutter brackets, and a hipped Roman tile roof. There are three storeys and two bays. On the ground floor are two 19th-century shopfronts, the left with moulded pilasters and a continuous frieze, and the right with a moulded frieze on fluted brackets. The upper floors contain sash windows with channelled wedge lintels and decorative keystones.	II
28 and 29 Market Place; 53.74576°N 0.86627°W	—	Early 19th century	Two shops with dwellings above in brick, with a floor band, a dentilled eaves course, and a French tile roof with gable coping and a kneeler on the right. There are three storeys and two bays. On the ground floor are 19th-century shopfronts, both with a door on the left, the left shopfront with a frieze on acanthus leaf consoles, and the right with a frieze on brackets. The right bay of the middle floor contains a canted bay window, and the other windows are sashes with channelled wedge lintels and fluted keystones.	II
31 and 31A Market Place; 53.74595°N 0.86626°W		Early 19th century	Two shops on a corner site, with an oblique angle between them. They are stuccoed, and have rusticated quoins on the angle, paired gutter brackets, and a hipped Welsh slate roof. There are three storeys, and each shop has one bay. Both shops have 20th-century shopfronts, and on the upper floors are sash windows.	II
The former Board Inn; 53.74592°N 0.86602°W		Early 19th century	The public house is stuccoed, and has rusticated quoins, and a pantile roof with gable coping and plain kneelers. There are three storeys and two bays. On the front is a doorway with pilasters and a segmental pediment, flanked by fixed windows, and to the right is a passage entry. The upper floors contain tripartite sash windows.	II
45 and 47 Hailgate; 53.74626°N 0.86473°W	—	1827	A pair of houses in grey brick, with a timber cornice on paired brackets, and a Welsh slate roof with gable coping and round kneelers. There is a main block of two storeys and five bays, and recessed lower flanking bays with hipped roofs. On the front are two doorways with Ionic surrounds, and sash windows with cambered channelled wedge lintels and reeded keystones. On the upper floor of the outer bays are round-headed sash windows.	II
1 Bishopgate; 53.74677°N 0.86505°W	—	Late 1830s	A house at the end of a terrace in brown brick, with a hipped Welsh slate roof. There are two storeys and three bays. The central doorway has plain jambs, and impost blocks and a hood on consoles. The windows are sashes with channelled wedge lintels and panelled dropped keystones.	II
5 Bishopgate; 53.74667°N 0.86485°W		Late 1830s	A house at the end of a terrace in brown brick, with paired gutter brackets, and a Welsh slate roof. There are two storeys and two bays. The doorway in the right bay has plain jambs, a rectangular decorated fanlight, and impost blocks and a hood on consoles. To the right is a smaller doorway with a stone lintel. The windows are sashes with channelled wedge lintels and panelled dropped keystones.	II
7 Bishopgate; 53.74659°N 0.86472°W	—	Late 1830s	A house on a corner site, in brown brick, with a hipped Welsh slate roof. There are two storeys four bays on the front and one on the right return. The doorway in the third bay has plain jambs, a rectangular decorated fanlight, and impost blocks and a hood on consoles. The windows are sashes with channelled wedge lintels and panelled dropped keystones.	II
28 and 30 Bridgegate; 53.74686°N 0.86499°W	—	Late 1830s	A pair of houses in brick, partly colourwashed, with bracketed eaves, and a Welsh slate roof, hipped on the left. There are two storeys and five bays. The two main doorways have fluted surrounds, panelled reveals, rectangular fanlights, and cornices on consoles. To the extreme left is a doorway with a divided fanlight and a cambered channelled wedge lintel with a fluted keystone. To the extreme right is a doorway with a round arch, a radial fanlight and a keystone. The windows are sashes with cambered channelled wedge lintels and fluted keystones.	II
66 Hailgate; 53.74660°N 0.86460°W	—	Late 1830s	The house is in brown brick, with paired gutter brackets and a Welsh slate roof. There are two storeys and two bays. The doorway on the left has plain jambs, a rectangular fanlight, and impost blocks and a hood on consoles. To the right is a round-arched passage doorway. The windows are sashes with channelled wedge lintels and panelled dropped keystones.	II
24 Bridgegate; 53.74700°N 0.86463°W	—	Early to mid-19th century	The house is in rendered brick, with quoins, a moulded sill band, and a Welsh slate roof with raised gable ends. There are two storeys and three bays. The central doorway has an elaborate eared and shouldered doorcase flanked by pilasters, a divided fanlight, a nodding keystone and a dentilled cornice. It is flanked by sash windows with similar surrounds and aprons, but no pilasters. On the upper floor are sash windows in eared architraves with pyramidal motifs, and triple keystones.	II
27 Bridgegate; 53.74652°N 0.86612°W	—	Early to mid-19th century	A shop and a flat in colourwashed brick, and a hipped Welsh slate roof. There are three storeys and two bays. The shopfront has a central doorway, and the flat entrance is on the right, its doorway with a rectangular fanlight. On the front are pilaster strips, scrolled consoles, impost blocks with acanthus motifs, a frieze, and a cornice on paired brackets. The upper floor contains sash windows with wedge lintels.	II
29 Bridgegate; 53.74651°N 0.86621°W	—	Early to mid-19th century	A shop and a house in brick, with paired gutter brackets, and a hipped pantile roof. There are three storeys and two bays. On the ground floor is a shopfront, with a doorway on the right and the house doorway on the left, both with rectangular fanlights. On the front are panelled pilaster strips, scrolled consoles, impost blocks, a frieze, and a cornice. The upper floor contains sash windows with flat brick arches.	II
Hailgate House; 53.74651°N 0.86397°W		c. 1840	The house is in red brick, with stone dressings, rusticated quoins, a wide moulded cornice and a hipped Welsh slate roof. There are two storeys and three bays. In the centre is a Greek Doric porch with a pediment, and a doorway with a semicircular divided fanlight. The windows are sashes, on the ground floor in shouldered architraves with aprons and cornices on consoles, and on the upper floor with architraves and sills on brackets.	II
Howden railway station 53.76488°N 0.86075°W		1840	The station and stationmaster's house were built for the Hull and Selby Railway, and later converted into a private house. It is in brick, with stone dressings, and has a Welsh slate roof with gable copings and brick kneelers. There are nine bays, the left four bays with a single storey, the right five bays with two storeys, and the middle bay gabled and projecting. In front of the outer bays are verandahs. The windows are a mix of horizontally sliding sashes and fixed windows in eared surrounds, some surrounds also shouldered.	II
20 Treeton Road; 53.74290°N 0.87031°W		1843	A police station and lock-up designed by H. F. Lockwood, later a private house, it is in brick on a plinth, with a floor band, overhanging eaves, and a Welsh slate roof, hipped over the middle bay, and with coping on the outer bays. There are three bays. The middle bay projects, it has two storeys, and extends at the rear with a wing, an outhouse and a small bay. It contains a round-arched doorway in a moulded architrave, flanked by fixed windows in eared architraves. Above is a bracketed panelled sill band, and a sash window in an eared architrave. The outer bays have a single storey, and contain sash windows in eared architraves.	II
Sacred Heart Church; 53.74266°N 0.87115°W		1850–52	The church, designed by Joseph Hansom, is in white brick with stone dressings and a slate roof. It consists of a nave, aisles, a chancel with an apse, and a western bell turret. The bell turret is octagonal, it has two stages, a string course, a trefoil band at the top, and a small spire.	II
Shire Hall; 53.74556°N 0.86588°W		1871–72	A market hall and shops in brick, with stone banding and dressings, and a tile roof. It is in three sections; on the left is a three-stage tower with a shopfront on the ground floor, a two-light window on the middle stage with a dentilled band above. The top stage has a circular clock face with three shields above and a truncated pyramidal roof. The middle section has two storeys and three bays. On the upper floor are three transomed windows, below the right two windows is a balcony on console brackets, and above are dentilled and cogged bands. The right section is the largest, and has a crow-stepped gable. On the ground floor are two pointed arches, and to the right is a shopfront over which is a frieze of decorative tile work. On the upper storey is an empty niche flanked by tall transomed windows with a continuous hood mould, and above is a round-arched lancet window with an ogee hood mould and a finial.	II
Signal box, Howden railway station 53.76468°N 0.86034°W		1873	The signal box, now disused, was built for the North Eastern Railway. It is in red brick on a plinth, with a stone floor band, corner pilasters, and a slate roof with overhanging eaves and finials. On the east front are external steps leading to a doorway. Some windows have round-arched heads, and the others are horizontally sliding sashes.	II
Windpump, Brickyard Farm; 53.76979°N 0.85935°W		1873	The pumping mill to the former brickyard is in brick, and consists of a tapering tower about 6 metres (20 ft) in height. It contains a low round-arched doorway and timber staging 2.6 metres (8 ft 6 in) from the ground. At the top are sails and cast iron fittings.	II
2 Churchside; 53.74558°N 0.86687°W		1876	A house, at one time a bank, in the style of a Florentine palazzo, it is in white brick, with stone dressings and a slate roof. There are three storeys and three bays. The ground floor has banded Corinthian pilasters, a central doorway with an elliptical-headed fanlight, flanked by fixed windows under elliptical arches with egg and dart motifs and dropped keystones. Above is a frieze with paterae, and a cornice on brackets with carved stone heads. The upper floors are flanked by quoins, and contain sash windows in architraves, the middle floor with friezes containing shell motifs, and the central window with a pediment. The top floor has a sill band. Above is a frieze with alternating panels and a cornice on brackets.	II
War memorial 53.74617°N 0.86741°W		1920	The war memorial in St Helen's Square is in stone, and has an octagonal plan. It has a moulded base on two steps, with panels containing blind tracery and inscribed plaques. Above is a moulded cornice, and round-headed niches containing statues, flanked by offset buttresses with finials. There are carved spandrels and a parapet, a tall pinnacle with blind niches holding paterae and with complex hoods, and the whole is surmounted by a cross.	II
Telephone kiosk 53.74624°N 0.86719°W		1935	The telephone kiosk in St Helen's Square is of the K6 type designed by Giles Gilbert Scott. Constructed in cast iron with a square plan and a dome, it has three unperforated crowns in the top panels.	II
