= His Majesty's Railway Inspectorate =

British organisation responsible for railway and tramway safety

Non-ministerial government department overview
- Formed: 1840
- Superseding Non-ministerial government department: Office of Rail and Road
- Jurisdiction: Great Britain
- Headquarters: 25 Cabot Square, London E14 4QZ
- Non-ministerial government department executive: Richard Hines, HM Chief Inspector of Railways
- Website: www.orr.gov.uk

His Majesty's Railway Inspectorate (HMRI) is the organisation responsible for overseeing safety on Britain's railways and tramways. Established in 1840, it was previously a separate non-departmental public body, but from 1990 to April 2006 was part of the Health and Safety Executive. It was then transferred to the Office of Rail and Road and ceased to exist by that name in May 2009 when it was renamed the Safety Directorate. However, in summer 2015 its name was re-established as the safety arm of ORR.

== Modern HMRI inspectorate ==
The modern HMRI within the Office of Road and Rail (ORR) identifies as "The Railway Inspectorate". HMRI works in tandem with the rest of the ORR, and as such may be consulted on matters effecting industry efficiency.

Internally, most of HMRI's inspectors are part of the Railway Safety Directorate (RSD) of the ORR, although some Railway Performance and Planning (RPP) engineers have some more limited powers as warranted HMRI individuals.

HMRI's role and powers largely mirror the HSE which is the safety regulator in other non-railway industries. HMRI has powers to enter a railway under section 20 of the Health and Safety at Work etc. Act 1974. It also issues licensing and drivers' licences under the Railways and Other Guided Transport Systems (Safety) Regulations 2006 (ROGS).

HMRI's individuals are drawn from within industry and experienced HSE inspectors. Commonly, individuals are professional engineers or time-served safety professionals. All inspectors are issued a warrant by the chief inspector to that effect. Normally an inspector will use the industry Personal Track Safety (PTS) card. However, inspectors have the right, in reasonable circumstances, not to do so.

== History ==
=== First fifty years ===
==== Establishment ====
The body originated in 1840, as a result of the Railway Regulation Act 1840 ('Lord Seymour's Act'), when Inspecting Officers of Railways were first appointed by the Board of Trade (BoT).

Britain's railways at that time were private companies; the 1840 Act required them to report to the BoT all accidents which had caused personal injury: it also gave the inspectorate powers to inspect any railway, and hence from its formation the inspectorate was used to investigate serious railway accidents and report upon them to the BoT.

==== Inspection of new lines ====
They were tasked with inspecting new lines, and commenting on their suitability for carrying passenger traffic.

However, the inspectorate had no powers to require changes until the Railway Regulation Act 1842 ('An Act for the better Regulation of Railways and for the Conveyance of Troops') gave the BoT powers to delay opening of new lines if the inspectorate was concerned about "Incompleteness of the Works or permanent Way, or the Insufficiency of the Establishment" for working the line.

==== Crash investigation ====
Their first investigation was of the Howden rail crash on 7 August 1840, which had killed five passengers (although the inspector's report said four, three passengers were killed instantly, two dying later of their injuries) as a result of the derailment of a train caused by the fall of a large casting from a wagon on a passenger train.

The inspectorate's reports of their accident investigations were made to the BoT alone, but eventually published as part of the BoT's annual report to Parliament.

==== Competence ====
Until the late 1960s HMRI's inspecting officers were all recruited from the Corps of Royal Engineers. In the early years of the inspectorate, their competence to adjudicate on civil engineering structures was questioned by critics, sometimes with good reason.

A reorganisation of the inspectorate in November 1846 abolished the post of inspector-general, and led to the departure of Major-General Charles Pasley, the incumbent, and one of his subordinates.

Pasley had come under criticism after the bridges and earthworks of the North British Railway's line from Edinburgh to Berwick – approved by Pasley in June 1846 – failed to withstand heavy rain in September 1846, with nineteen miles of track being rendered unusable. Temporary works were undertaken to restore a service, Pasley approved them (orally), but some of the new work then proved faulty.

In 1849 the Manchester, Sheffield and Lincolnshire Railway's Torksey Viaduct across the River Trent was not initially accepted by the railway inspector Lintorn Simmons because he was unhappy with its novel (tubular girder) design by John Fowler.

This decision (and also the basic premise that a bridge designed by a member of the Institution of Civil Engineers (ICE) which had passed all practical tests could be rejected by a railway inspector because he was uncomfortable with its novel design) was criticised by the ICE:

"The subject has been discussed in the Institution of Civil Engineers, and every eminent engineer was of the opinion that the Government inspector was clearly wrong".

Threatened with a call for a parliamentary enquiry should approval continue to be withheld, the inspectorate reconsidered and approved the bridge un-modified.

Subsequently, and consequently, the BoT took the view that (as it explained in defending itself from criticism that the defects in the Tay Bridge should have been seen and acted upon by the inspectorate):

"The duty of an inspecting officer, so far as regards design, is to see that the construction is not such as to transgress those rules and precautions which practice and experience have proved to be necessary for safety. If he were to go beyond this, or if he were to make himself responsible for every novel design, and if he were to attempt to introduce new rules and practices not accepted by the profession, he would be removing from the civil engineer, and taking upon himself a responsibility not committed to him by Parliament."

Critics at the end of the 1850s also noted that during the Crimean War, the Grand Crimean Central Railway had been built to forward supplies from Balaclava to British siege lines not by the Royal Engineers, but by a consortium of civilian railway contractors. If the government turned to civilians as best fitted to build a military railway, was it not anomalous that it thought military engineers best fitted to inspect new railway lines?

==== Extension and formalisation of powers ====
The inspectorate's powers were extended and formalised by the Railway Regulation Act 1871 ('An Act to amend the Law respecting the Inspection and Regulation of Railways'). Paragraph 4 extended the power to inspect to give inspectors explicit powers to require the production of persons and papers by a company being inspected. Paragraph 5 meant new works on existing lines were liable to the same inspection regime as new lines. The BoT could now set up a formal court of inquiry to investigate an accident, taking evidence on oath in public hearings. Inspectors investigating an accident were now required to make a formal report to the BoT, which was now empowered to publish reports (from an inspector or from a court of inquiry) directly.

Subsequent public inquiries under the new powers included those into the Shipton-on-Cherwell train crash in 1874 (chaired by an inspector William Yolland), and into the Tay Bridge disaster of 1879. However, the procedure fell into abeyance after the failure of the three-man board (of which Yolland, by now chief inspecting officer, was a member) of the Tay Bridge inquiry to arrive at an agreed report.

For many years in the mid-19th century the Railway Inspectorate advocated in its accident returns and otherwise three safety measures it saw as vital to ensure passenger safety:

- "lock" Interlocking of points and signals, so that conflicting signal indications are prevented;
- "block" A space-interval or absolute block system of signalling, where one train is not allowed to enter a physical section until the preceding one had left it; and
- "brake" Continuous brakes, to put at the command of the engine driver adequate braking power; this requirement being increased as the technology made it reasonable to 'automatic' (in modern parlance 'fail-safe') continuous brakes which had to be 'held off' by vacuum or compressed air and would be applied automatically if that supply was lost (e.g. if a train were divided).

The Board of Trade got as far and as fast as it could by persuasion, but had no powers to enforce its views on often reluctant railway managements of existing lines.

Inspectors disagreed as to whether the board should be given powers to require changes. Yolland's official report on an 1867 accident (in which eight people died at a junction unaltered since an 1862 fatal accident, despite an inspector having urged improvements) pressed for such powers:

Their Lordships have no control whatever over railways after they are once opened for traffic, however defective and dangerous the structures and permanent way may be, and however imperfectly the construction of junctions and the laying out of altered station yards may provide for the public safety.

It is true that the practice of the Department is to send one of the inspecting officers to inquire into and report upon the circumstances attending accidents, as in this and the former collision at Walton Junction, and such inquiries are submitted to by the railway companies; but their Lordships are not empowered to make an order for anything to be done.

No responsibility appears to attach to any person for the complete neglect exhibited towards Captain Tyler's recommendations; and the unfortunate signalman of thirty years' service, who was, I have no doubt, as he thought, doing his duty properly, is the only person to whom any liability attaches; whereas the expenditure of a small sum would have prevented him from inadvertently committing the act for which he will shortly be tried for manslaughter, and have saved the railway company a very large sum of money that must now be paid as compensation for those who suffered.

The utility of their Lordships continuing to maintain the present system of making these unauthorized inquiries into the circumstances connected with the accidents which occur on railways may therefore be fairly questioned as a stronger instance of its inutility cannot be cited than what has recently occurred with reference to the Walton junction.

Tyler himself supported the view taken by successive governments: that to take such powers would remove the clarity of existing arrangements, where responsibility for passenger safety lay with the railway companies alone.

The death of 80 people on a Sunday school outing in the Armagh rail disaster of 1889 brought a reversal of this policy on the three key issues: within two months of the accident Parliament had enacted the Regulation of Railways Act 1889, which authorised the Board of Trade to require the use of continuous automatic brakes on passenger railways, along with the block system of signalling and the interlocking of all points and signals. This is often taken as the beginning of the modern era in UK rail safety: "the old happy-go-lucky days of railway working" came to an end.

=== Modern era ===
The chief inspecting officer from 1916 to 1929 was Colonel John Wallace Pringle, responsible for investigating many accidents. It was during his tenure, in 1919, that the office became part of the newly created Ministry of Transport.

The last chief inspecting officer with a Royal Engineers background, Major Rose, retired in 1988 and he was replaced by an appointee from the Health and Safety Executive (HSE).

Since then, inspecting officers have been recruited from the HSE or as mid-career railway employees from the former British Rail.

=== HM Chief Inspectors of Railways ===
Chief inspecting officer	Dates
Lieutenant-Colonel Sir John Mark Frederic Smith	1840–1841
Major-General Charles Pasley	1840–1846
Post disappeared as a result of reorganisation in November 1846: there were two inspectors, neither designated as chief (and neither Pasley)
Captain Henry Whatley Tyler	1870–1877
Lt-Col William Yolland	1877–1885
Col. Frederick Henry Rich	1885–1889
Major General Charles Scrope Hutchinson	1892–1895
Major Sir Francis Arthur Marindin	1895–1899
Lt-Col. Sir Horatio Arthur Yorke	1900–1913
Lt-Col Pelham George Von Donop	1913–1916
Major Sir John Wallace Pringle	1916–1929
Lt-Col Sir Alan Henry Lawrence Mount	1929–1949
Lt-Col George Robert Stewart Wilson	1949–1957
Brigadier Charles Ardagh Langley	1958–1963
Colonel Denis McMullen	1963–1968
Col. John Richard Hugh Robertson	1969–1973
Lt-Col. Ian Kenneth Arnold McNaughton	1974–1982
Major Charles Frederick Rose	1982–1988
Robin J. Seymour	1988–1993
Stanley S. J. Robertson	1993–1998
Vic Coleman	1998–2002
Dr. Allan Douglas Sefton (acting head)	until November 2002
Alan Osborne	November 2002–October 2003
Dr. Allan Douglas Sefton	October 2003–December 2005
Linda Williams	December 2005–September 2008
Ian Prosser	September 2008–June 2024
Richard Hines	June 2024–

== Original twin functions of the HMRI ==
The function of HMRI was to inspect and approve all new (or modified) railway works and to investigate railway accidents.

Accident investigations were inquisitorial, generally not open to the public, and aimed to determine the causes behind the accident (both the immediate cause and contributory factors) and to make recommendations to avoid re-occurrence. Until the 1860s, in the first instance, accident reports were internal and only published in the accident returns made from time to time by the Board of Trade to Parliament. For fatal accidents, a coroner's inquest would also be held, which inspectors might attend to hear the evidence, to assist the coroner, or to give evidence themselves of what their investigation had found. (Note: For an example of this twin-track procedure, see Evening Standard (1860, p. 3)) In the absence of input from the inspectorate, inquests rarely went beyond the immediate cause; hence, said one inspector in 1870:

"Coroner's inquests, as generally conducted, are singularly ill calculated to ascertain the real causes of railway accidents; but they are supposed to be sometimes serviceable... to the railway companies, in concealing the mismanagement of the company from the public".

Coroner's inquests were public and their proceedings and verdicts widely reported in the press.

In later years, accident reports were published directly, widely circulated within the railway industry, and reported upon by the press.

== Recent history ==
The HMRI became part of the Department of Transport and remained so until 1990, when it was transferred to the Health and Safety Executive (HSE). About this time HMRI expanded its scope and recruited additional staff, Railway Employment Officers. It was their job to monitor the workplace safety and health of railway employees.

After the move to the HSE, (newsworthy) train crash investigations tended to be held as public inquiries presided over by a High Court judge; and the findings published. These inquiries tended to be more adversarial; with the aim of identifying the guilty parties. In some cases criminal prosecution of these parties has occurred in parallel with the public inquiry, delaying the inquiry until the criminal prosecutions have been completed.

The transfer to the HSE was unpopular with many in the industry, and as part of its rail review in 2004 the government announced that the Railway Inspectorate would be transferred from the HSE to merge with the Office of Rail Regulation (now the Office of Rail and Road). The transfer took place on 2 April 2006.

The inspectorate oversaw both operational safety and the initial integrity of new and modified works. As a result of the legislative change, which transferred them to the Office of Rail Regulation, the scope of HMRI enforcement no longer covered guided bus, trolleybus and most cable-hauled transport systems.

On the 17th October 2005 responsibility for investigating railway accidents was transferred from HMRI to the newly formed Rail Accident Investigation Branch (RAIB). The Cullen Report into the Ladbroke Grove rail crash in 1999 recommended the establishment of an accident investigation body within the Department for Transport along the same lines as the Marine Accident Investigation Branch and the Air Accidents Investigation Branch. The involvement of HMRI as the principal safety investigating agency attracted criticism on the grounds that the HSE might be investigating itself, if, for example, the HSE had approved a track layout or a signalling scheme later suspected to have been at fault.

In May 2009 the legal entity known as "HM Railway Inspectorate" ceased to exist when a single rail regulatory body covering both safety and economic issues, the Safety Directorate, was created, but the 180 individual inspectors will continue to be known as His Majesty's Railway Inspectors.

A summary of government bodies overseeing HM Railway Inspectorate are shown in the table. Several changes reflect wider government re-organisations.

Government bodies overseeing HM Railway Inspectorate
Government Department	Years	Notes
Board of Trade	1840–May 1919	BoT appointed inspectors
Ministry of Transport	May1919–Oct 1970	MoT established 1919, including Min. of War Transport, and Min. of Transport and Civil Aviation.
Department of Environment	Oct 1970–Sept 1976	Included Transport
Department of Transport	Sept 1976–Dec 1990	DoT established Sept 1976
Health & Safety Executive	Dec 1990–April 2006	HSE established Jan 1975
Office of Rail Regulation	April 2006–April 2015	ORR established July 2004
Office of Rail and Road	April 2015–present	ORR name and remit changed

== See also ==
- Rail Accident Investigation Branch
