= Shire Hall, Howden =

Building in Howden, East Riding of Yorkshire, England

Coordinates: 53°44′44″N 0°51′57″W

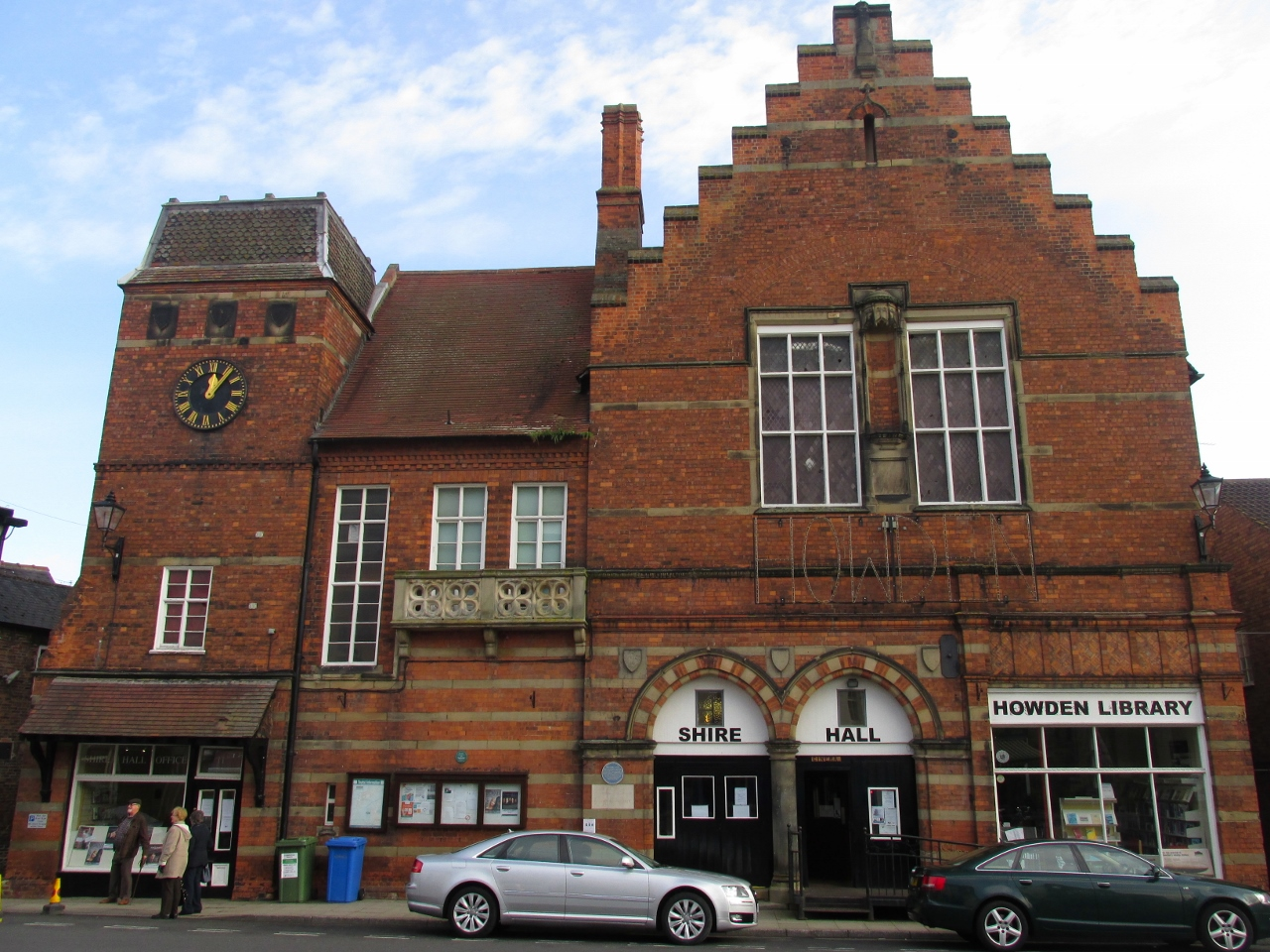
The building, in 2014

Shire Hall is a historic building in Howden, a town in the East Riding of Yorkshire, in England.

The building was constructed on the town's Market Place, replacing three shops. It was constructed between 1872 and 1873, to a design by Matthew Ellison Hadfield and Charles Hadfield. Its design was inspired by those of town halls in the Low Countries. The tower originally had a spire, which was later removed. The building was originally known as the "Market Hall", and the owners purchased all rights to markets and fairs in the town in an attempt to revive them, though this proved unsuccessful. The ground floor shop fronts were replaced in the 20th century, during which time the upper floor was used as a roller rink and cinema. The building was grade II listed in 1987. It is used as an events venue and for the display of tapestries created in the 1960s, showing the history of the town.

The building is constructed of brick, with stone banding and dressings, and a tile roof. It is in three sections; on the left is a three-stage tower with a shopfront on the ground floor, a two-light window on the middle stage with a dentilled band above. The top stage has a circular clock face with three shields above and a truncated pyramidal roof. The middle section has two storeys and three bays. On the upper floor are three transomed windows, below the right two windows is a balcony on console brackets, and above are dentilled and cogged bands. The right section is the largest, and has a crow-stepped gable. On the ground floor are two pointed arches, and to the right is a shopfront over which is a frieze of decorative tile work. On the upper storey is an empty niche flanked by tall transomed windows with a continuous hood mould, and above is a round-arched lancet window with an ogee hood mould and a finial.

== See also ==
- Listed buildings in Howden
