= Howden =

Town and civil parish in the East Riding of Yorkshire, England

Coordinates: 53°44′48″N 0°51′48″W

- Market town and civil parish
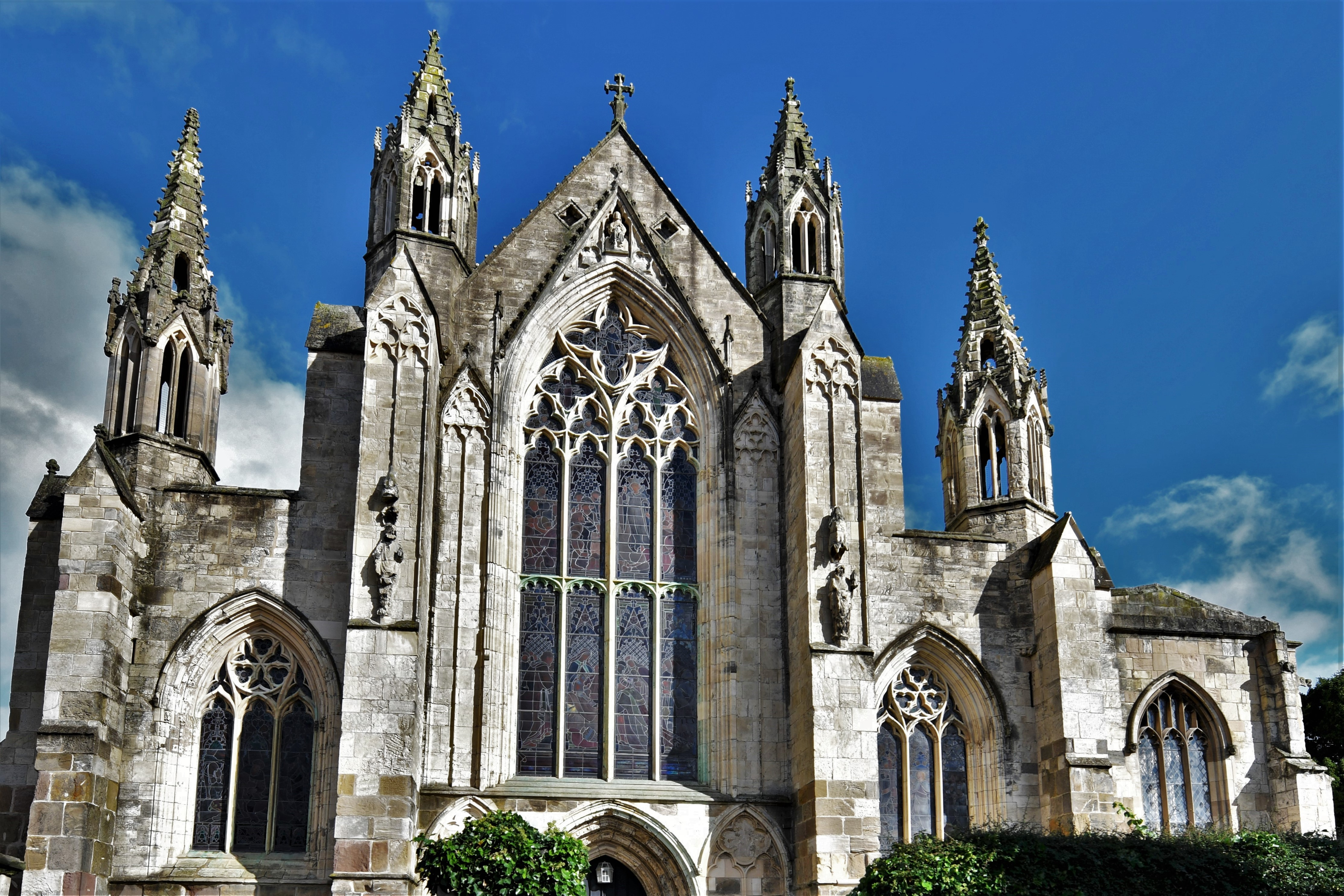
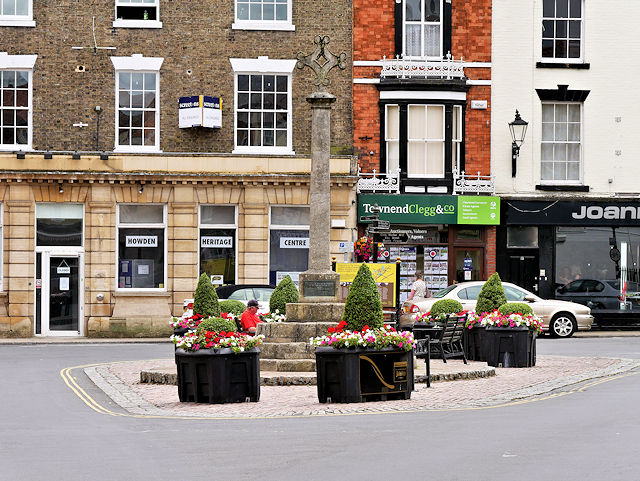
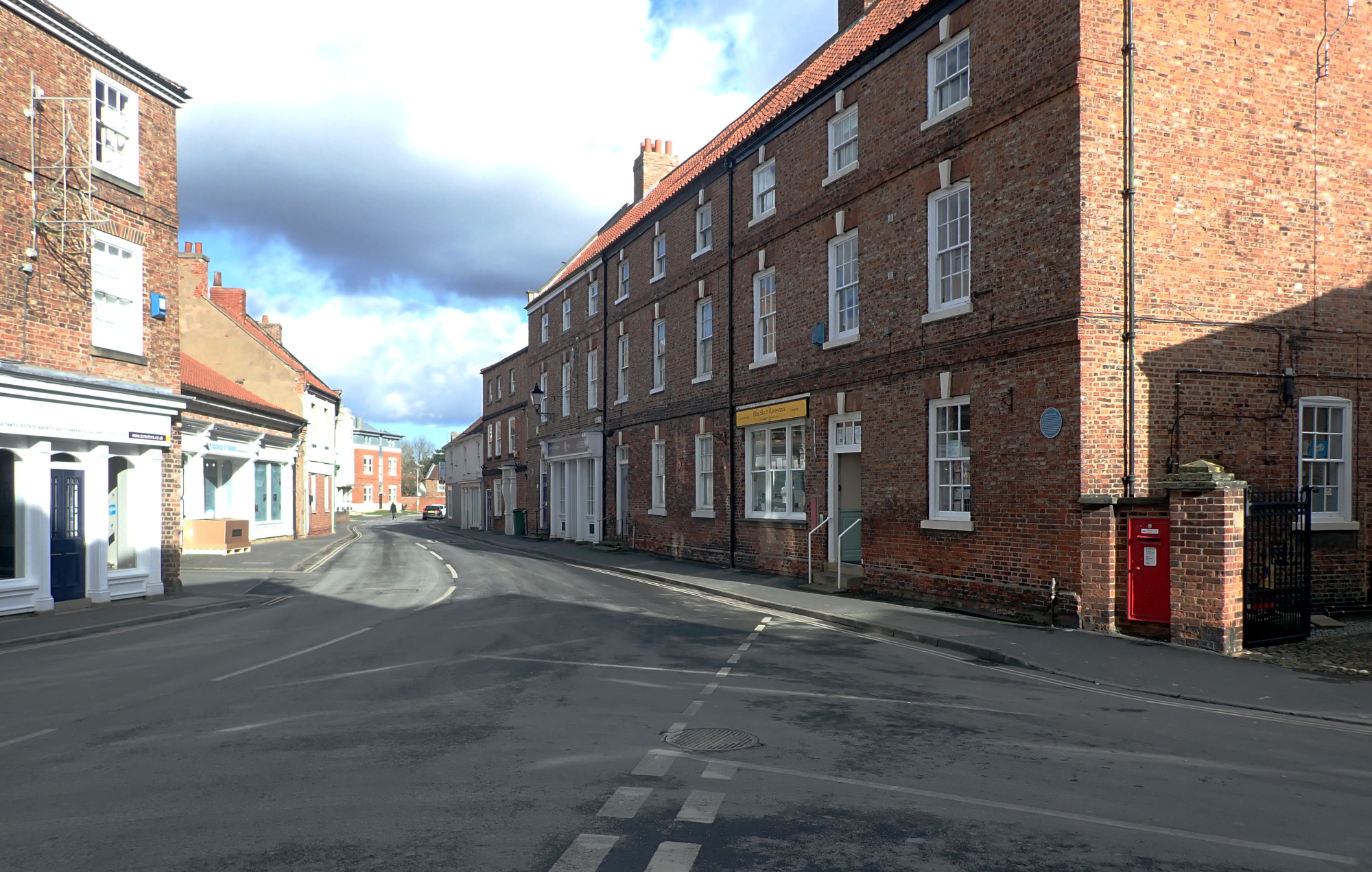
- Minster Market Cross Bridgegate

- Location within the East Riding of Yorkshire
- Population: 4,571 (2021 Census)
- OS grid reference: SE749281
- Civil parish: Howden
- Unitary authority: East Riding of Yorkshire
- Ceremonial county: East Riding of Yorkshire
- Region: Yorkshire and the Humber
- Country: England
- Sovereign state: United Kingdom
- Post town: GOOLE
- Postcode district: DN14
- Dialling code: 01430
- Police: Humberside
- Fire: Humberside
- Ambulance: Yorkshire
- UK Parliament: Goole and Pocklington

Howden (/ˈhaʊdən/) is a market town and civil parish in the East Riding of Yorkshire, England. It lies in the Vale of York to the north of the M62, on the A614 road about 16 miles (26 km) south-east of York and 3 miles (4.8 km) north of Goole, which lies across the River Ouse. It is known for Howden Minster, one of the largest churches in the East Riding. At the 2021 census, the parish had a population of 4,571.

William the Conqueror gave the town to the Bishops of Durham in 1080. The wapentake of Howdenshire was named after the town, and remained an exclave of County Durham until as late as 1846. The original boundaries of the wapentake were used for the current two government wards of Howden and Howdenshire, which had a combined population of 19,753 at the 2011 census.

== Geography ==
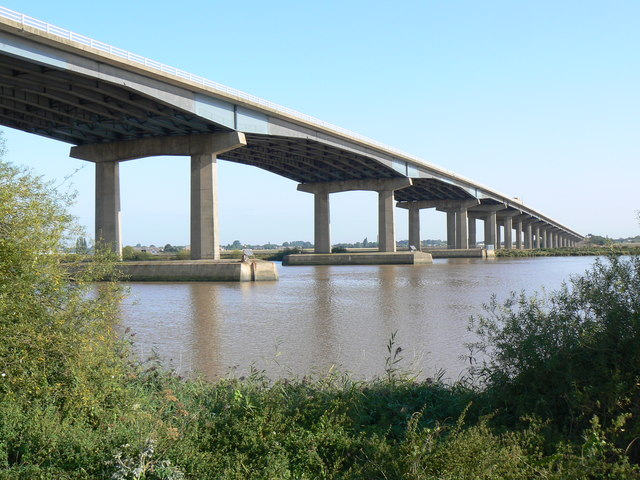
The M62 bridge crossing over the River Ouse

Howden is situated in the Vale of York, on the A614, although the town itself has been bypassed. Howden lies close to the M62 and the M18 motorways, nearby to Goole which lies at the opposite side of the River Ouse. The town is served by Howden railway station, which is situated in North Howden and has services to Leeds, Selby, York, Hull and London.

Howden is surrounded by largely flat land and in some places marshland. Much of the land surrounding Howden is separated by many drainage dykes.

Howden lies within the Parliamentary constituency of Goole and Pocklington.

== Early history ==
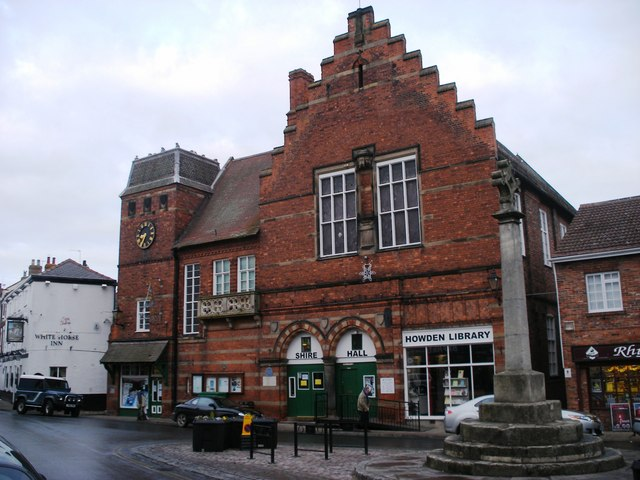
Howden Shire Hall

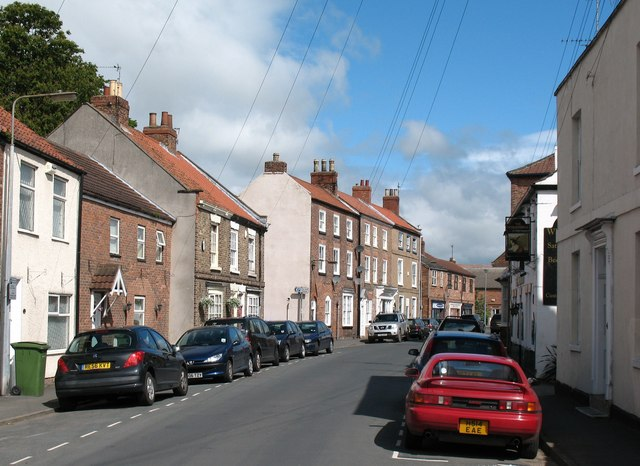
Hailgate

The name Howden is derived from the Old English hēafoddenu meaning 'head valley'. As there are no notable valleys nearby, the denu element (corresponding to the modern word dean) may instead have its older sense of 'low flat space', referring to the town standing on land raised above the surrounding marshes.

One of the earliest recorded parts of Howden's history describes King Edgar giving his first wife, Ethelfleda, Howden Manor in 959 AD, the beginnings of a long connection with the royal court of England. In 1080, William the Conqueror gave the town, including its church, which later became the minster, to the Bishop of Durham, who promptly conferred the church upon the monks of Durham. However, he kept Howden Manor for himself. Records show that the church was at first a rectory, but conflicting records also show that Hugh, Prior of Durham, was given a bull from Pope Gregory IX for appropriating the church towards the maintenance of 16 monks. Howden's royal connections continued when in 1191, Prince John spent Christmas in Howden. Nine years later, John, now King of England, granted Howden the right to hold an annual fair.

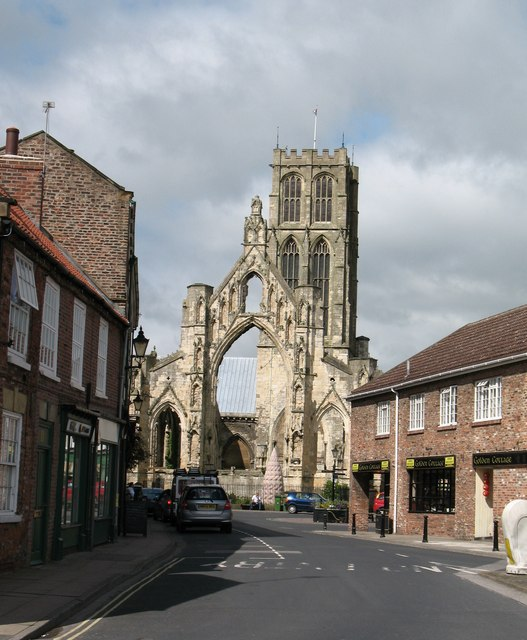
View of The Minster and The Choir Ruins from Hailgate

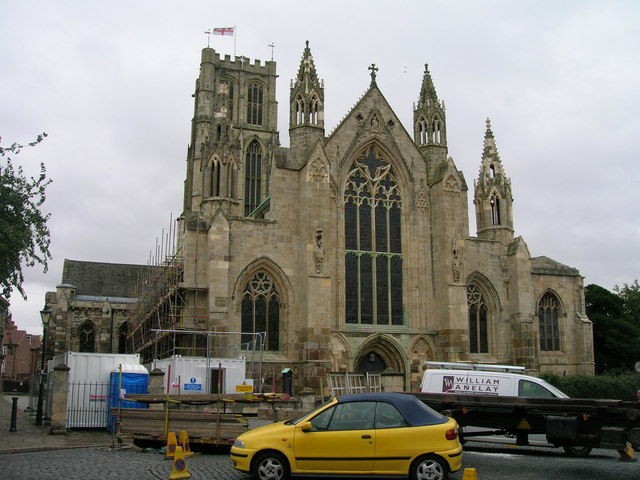
Howden Minster (west front)

In 1228, work began on the current Howden Minster, though it was not finished until the 15th century when the chapter house and top of the tower was added by Bishop Walter de Skirlaw.

In the 14th and 15th centuries, Howden became a centre for pilgrims because of John of Howden's alleged miracles in the latter part of the 13th century.

The most prolific of these tales was that John of Howden, at his funeral in 1275, raised his arms from his open coffin during his requiem mass to greet the host. As such, he has become regarded as a saint, though the Catholic Church has never made this official. Through the pilgrims, Howden received the money that it needed to complete the minster, fulfilling John of Howden's prophecy that he would continue aiding the minster from beyond the grave.

From 1665 to 1794, a site on Pinfold Street in Howden was used as a lodging house for the needy. A workhouse was then opened on the site which included a manufactory, stone-breaking yard, cowshed and prison. A parliamentary report of 1776 listed the parish workhouse at Howden as being able to accommodate up to 20 inmates.

Howden Poor Law Union was formed on 4 February 1837. Its operation was overseen by an elected Board of Guardians, 42 in number, representing its 40 constituent parishes as listed below (figures in brackets indicate numbers of Guardians if more than one):

East Riding: Asselby, Aughton, Backenholme with Woodale, Balkholme, Barmby-on-the-Marsh, Belby, Bellasize, Blacktoft, Breighton, Broomfleet, Bubwith, North Cave with Drewton Everthorpe, Cheapsides, Cotness, Eastrington, Elberton Priory, Flaxfleet, Foggathorpe, Gilberdyke, Gribthorpe, Harlthorpe, Hemingbrough, Holme upon Spalding Moor, Hotham, Howden (2), Kilpin, Knedlington, Latham, Loxton, Metham, Newport Wallingfen, New Village, Newsham & Brind and Wressle & Loftsome, Portington & Cavil, Saltmarsh, Scalby, Skelton, Spaldington, Thorpe, Willitoft, Yokefleet.

The population falling within the union at the 1831 census had been 12,728 with parishes ranging in size from Cotness (population 29) to Howden itself (2,130). The average annual poor-rate expenditure for the period 1834–36 had been £6,263.

Initially, the Howden Guardians declined to build a new workhouse but made use of the existing parish workhouses in Howden, Holme and Cave. However, in 1839, following persuasion by the region's Assistant Poor Law Commsissioner John Revans, a new building was erected on the south side of Knedlington Road. It was designed by Weightman and Hadfield of Sheffield.

== Partial ruin of Howden's minster ==
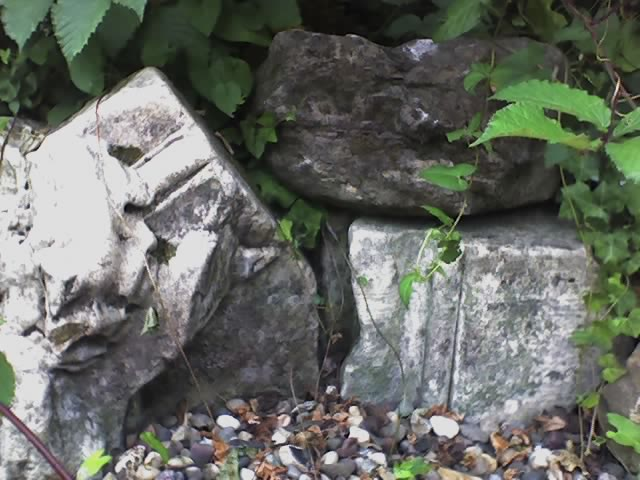
Some of the original stones from the partially-ruined Howden Minster

In 1548, Edward VI dissolved the Collegiate churches, including Howden. During her reign, Elizabeth I gave the revenues of the Manor of Howden to local landowners. But these landowners refused to repair the choir of the church, which eventually fell into ruin.

The minster fell into further ruin during the English Civil War, when the Parliamentarians used it as a stable during their stay on the way to lay siege to Wressle Castle. The troops damaged the interior extensively, destroying the organ, much of the wooden structures, and damaging some of the masonry. It is said that when leaving the town they were playing the pipes of the organ like penny whistles.

On the night of 29 September 1696, after nearly 150 years of neglect, the roof of the choir fell down. The remains were left where they fell until 1748 when the site was cleared, and the townsfolk took stones for their own use. Many used the masonry as building stones.

However, the nave of Howden Minster remains in use as the parish church.

== 19th century ==
In the early 19th century Howden became famous throughout Europe for its horse fair, held every September. In Georgian times, the fair was quoted in The Sporting Magazine in 1807 as being the "largest fair for horses in the Kingdom".

The fair, at its height, attracted all the principal horse dealers from every part of the United Kingdom. It is estimated that up to 4,000 horses were displayed for sale every day of the fair, and that the total worth of this kind of sale was £200,000.

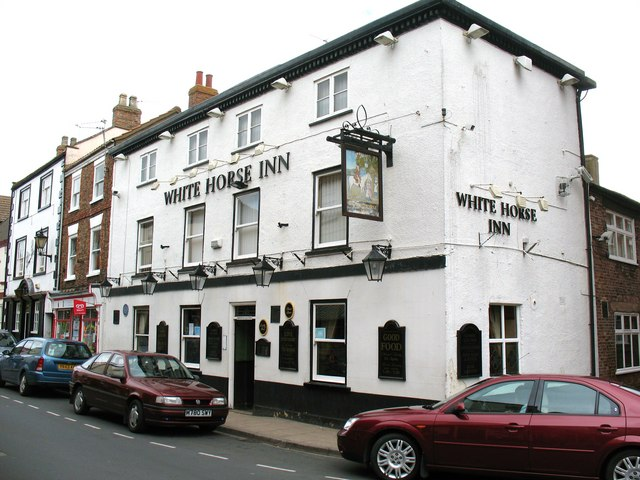
The White Horse Inn

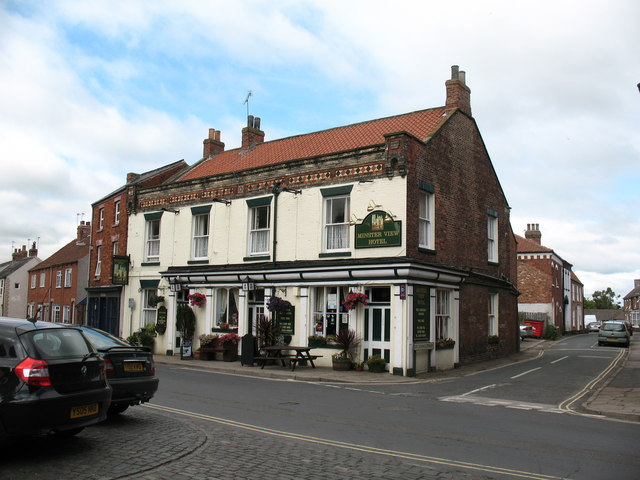
Minster View Hotel

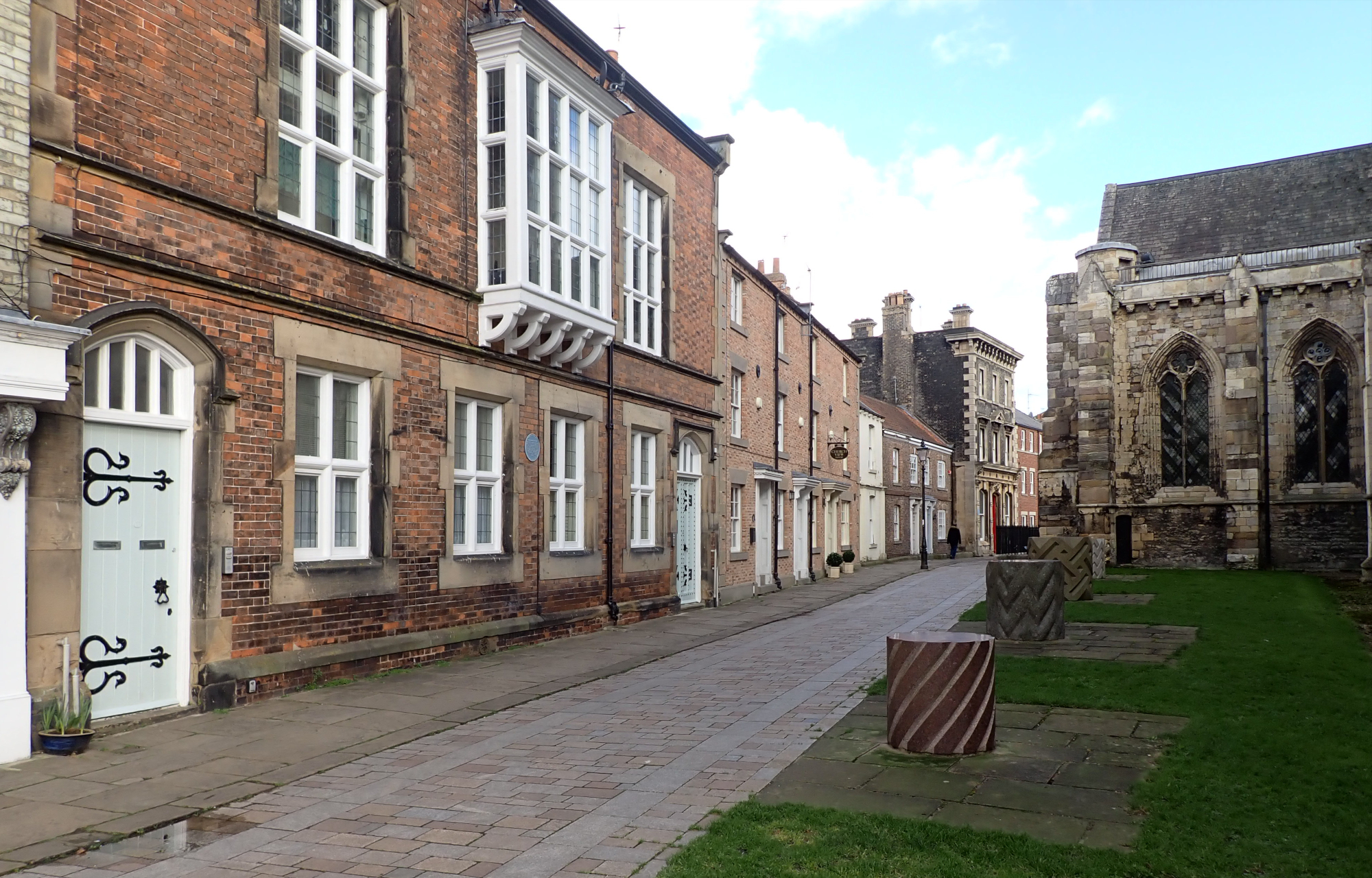
Howden Town Hall

Representatives of the British Army attended the fair, and it is thought that Wellington's cavalry used horses bought at Howden in the Napoleonic Wars.

Howden Town Hall was completed in 1851.

Howden Floral and Horticultural Society was formed in 1854 and held its first exhibition on Thursday 16 August 1855. This took place in the field adjoining the Bishop's Manor House, which was kindly lent by Mr G. Clark.

Due to the outbreak of the First and Second World Wars, the shows were halted from 1914 to 1920 and again between 1940 and 1946, but have been held every year since. The hundredth Howden Show was held in 1979 and it was then that it became a two-day event. In 2007 the show returned to its traditional home in the Ashes and also reverted to its original one-day format.

The annual Howden Horticultural and Agricultural show is now held on the first Sunday in July.

Howden's architecture is chiefly from the Georgian and Victorian eras, most of the town centre exclusively being built in this period. Most of Howden's pubs were built during this time, and it is said that, at one point, there were more pubs in Howden per square half-mile than anywhere else in the country.

One notable piece of architecture from this period is the Catholic Sacred Heart Church, Howden located at the junction of Knedlington Road and Buttfield Road. It is one of the early works of the distinguished architect, Joseph Aloysius Hansom, who later became famous for designing the hansom cab. However Hansom's greatest achievements were the churches (mostly Catholic) he designed, the most notable of which are St Walburge's in Preston (the church with the highest spire in England), the Holy Name in Manchester and what is now Arundel Cathedral. The Sacred Heart Church in Howden was opened in 1850 and is comparatively modest in size and simple in design, but nevertheless is clearly a work of some distinction.

Howden's first railway station opened in 1840 and a second on the Hull and Barnsley Railway was open between 1885 and 1955.

The town was the scene of the Howden rail accident in 1840, which killed five passengers when a large iron casting fell from a wagon, and derailed the train. It was one of the first accidents to be investigated by the new Railway Inspectorate.

== 20th century ==
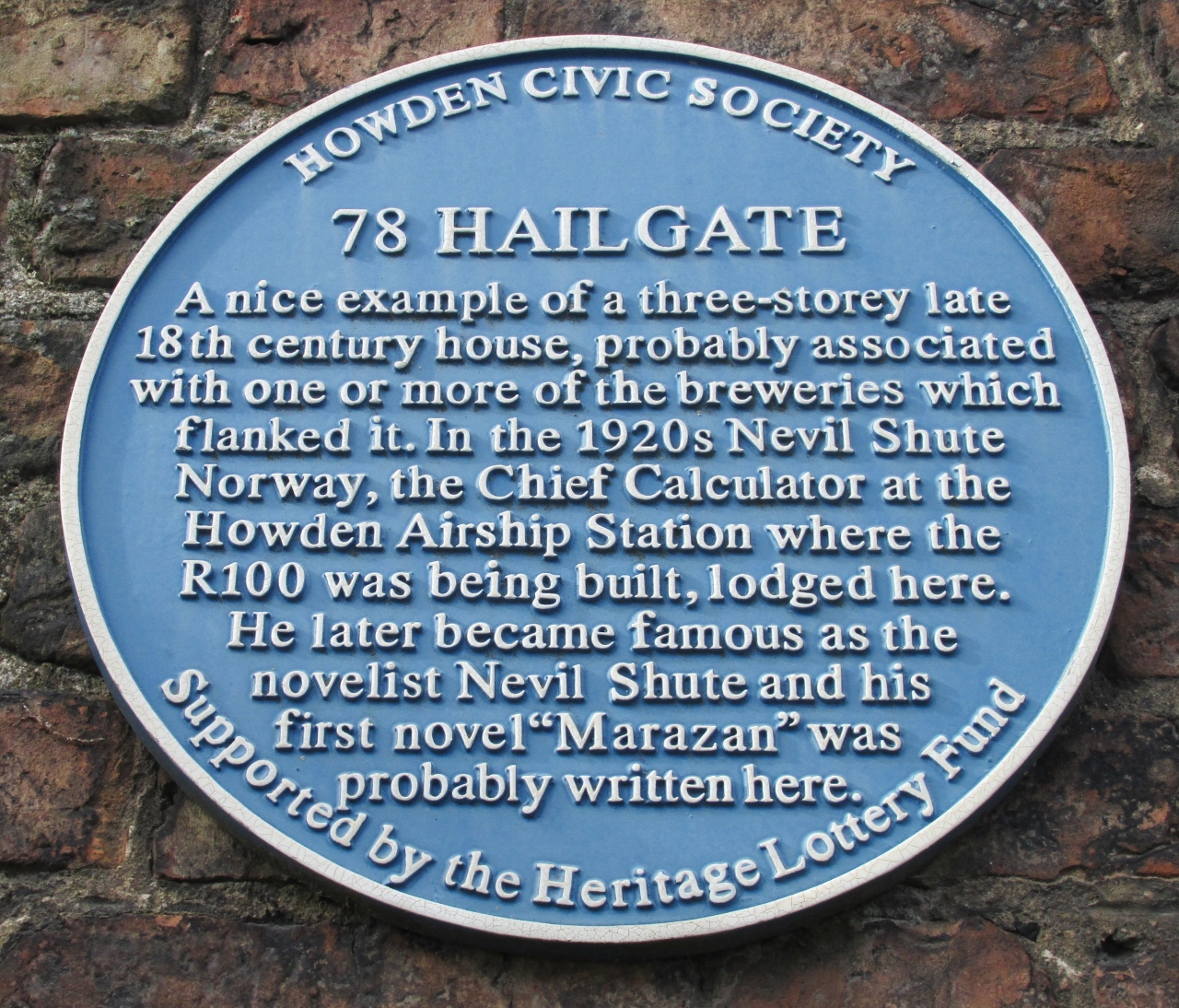
The plaque commemorating Nevil Shute on 78, Hailgate

During the First World War the British Admiralty needed a suitable site in north-east England for a new airship station to protect the ports and ships from the threat of attack by German U-boats. RNAS Howden opened in 1916 with its airship hangars. It provided not only protection for shipping along the east coast, but also jobs for hundreds of civilians. This helped to turn round the town's fortunes, which had been suffering since the building of the port at nearby Goole, and the passing of the horse fairs.

The airship station was closed following the abandonment of rigid airship development after the war and sold to a private developer, but with the establishment of the Imperial Airship Scheme in 1924 was bought by Vickers for the construction of the airship R100. The author Nevil Shute Norway was part of the team that created the R100, working under Barnes Wallis, the engineer and later designer of the Vickers Wellington bomber, and inventor of the bouncing bomb. Shute lived at number 78 Hailgate, and a plaque is now fixed to the house to commemorate this.

Shute is not always popular in Howden, because of what he wrote in his autobiography:

"The lads were what one would expect, straight from the plough, but the girls were an eye-opener. They were brutish and uncouth, filthy in appearance and in habits. Things may have changed since then – I hope they have. Perhaps the girls in very isolated districts such as that had less opportunity than their brothers for getting into the market and making contact with civilisation; I can only record the fact that these girls straight off the farms were the lowest types that I have ever seen in England, and incredibly foul-mouthed."

– Slide Rule: Autobiography of an Engineer, Nevil Shute, 1954.

In 1932, Howden Minster's renovations were completed, and its bells chimed every 15 minutes, a tradition that continues to this day.

It is popularly believed that on the night of 24 June 1954 the historian A. J. P. Taylor spent the night at the Wellington Hotel, and that he broke a water jug and a shaving mirror while staying there. However, this is untrue, as Taylor spent the night at the Bowman's Hotel, next door to the Wellington. It is also untrue that he broke the jug and mirror. Instead, he broke his wrist falling from the unusually high bed.

In the latter part of the mid-20th century, two banks and two Co-op grocery stores, the town's largest, opened, giving the people of Howden a more convenient infrastructure. The smaller of the two Co-op stores is presently a Today's store, still owned by The Co-Operative Group.

== 21st century ==
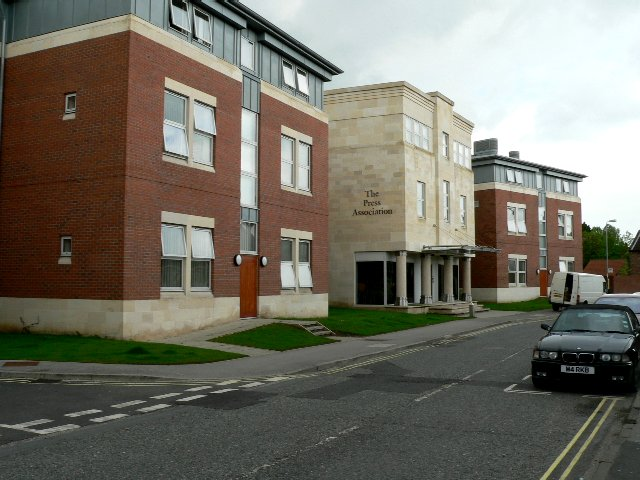
Main offices of the Press Association in Howden on Bridgegate

In late 2003 the Press Association (PA) completed building work on what it calls its 'Operations Centre', despite notable opposition from the residents of Howden, and it stands on the site of the old Georgian police station. This left Howden without a police presence in the town until late 2005. The building was officially opened by Prince Charles, continuing Howden's relations with the Royal family.

PA has several hundred employees, most of whom have been brought into the town from Leeds and London, at this building and others in the town. The local public transport facilities have proved inadequate for many staff who commute, as much of the work is done round the clock. This has led to considerable strain being put on Howden's parking facilities, leading to the creation of a Controlled Parking Zone embracing most of the central area of the town.

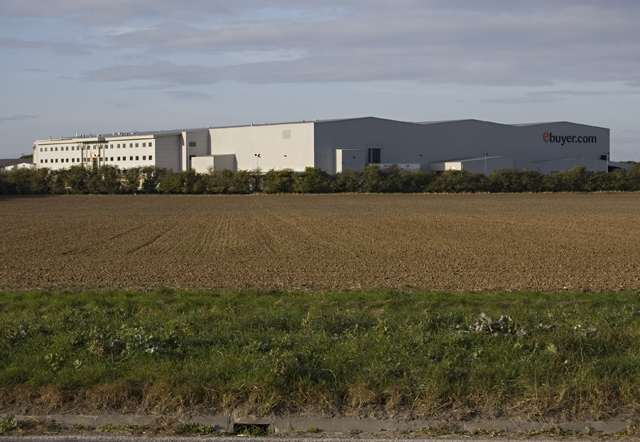
Ebuyer.com

Online retailer Ebuyer.com also recently relocated their headquarters from Sheffield to Howden. Their vast warehouse and office building is on Ferry Road, close to Howdendyke. Adjacent to the Ebuyer.com headquarters is that of Wren Kitchens along with a new warehouse and distribution centre. This new development is in partnership with Ebuyer.

Plans for the further development of Howden include a permanent set of traffic lights, more housing and an industrial estate.

Howden Minster is currently undergoing another renovation, with the aid of English Heritage. The Minster hopes to raise £300,000 in the next two years. The famous Yorkshire wood carver, Mousy Thompson of Kilburn, made the fine choir stalls and much of the other minster furnishings, as seen on Look North. Children love to hunt for the 30+ Thompson mice hidden around the Minster.

Howden was featured in The Times top 20 list of places with the best standard of living in the UK in 2005.

== Notable people ==
- Henry Abbot (martyr) (†1597)
- Bernard Kettlewell (1907–1979), biologist
- Nevil Shute (1899–1960), engineer and novelist

== Media ==
Television signals are received from either the Emley Moor or Belmont TV transmitters. Local radio stations are BBC Radio Humberside, Nation Radio East Yorkshire, Hits Radio East Yorkshire & North Lincolnshire, Greatest Hits Radio Yorkshire and Capital Yorkshire. The town is served by the local newspaper, The Goole Times.

== Governance ==
An electoral ward with the same name exists. This ward stretches west to Barmby on the Marsh with a total population taken at the 2011 Census of 4,865.

== Politics ==
The parliamentary seat of Goole and Pocklington is held by David Davis, the former Shadow Home Secretary and former Secretary of State for Exiting the European Union. According to the 2021 Census the civil parish of Howden had a population of 4,571, an increase on the 2011 UK census figure of 1,142. The civil parish also includes North Howden and part of Boothferry.

The current Howden town councillor is Mark Preston, of the Conservative Party.

== See also ==
- Listed buildings in Howden
- Howden School and Technology College
- Howden rail accident
