= John Revans =

John Revans was secretary to the English Poor Law Commission and the Royal Commission on the Poorer Classes in Ireland 1833. In 1836, he was appointed assistant commissioner of the Poor Laws. In the 1840s he conducted an examination of the Chartist land settlements for the Poor Law Commissioners.

He was described as a "Benthamite radical".

== Selected publications ==
- Observations on the timber trade. Richardson, 1831.
- Remarks on the navigation laws. Baldwin, Cradock, and Joy, 1831.
- Evils of the state of Ireland, their causes, and their remedy; a poor law. 1836.
