= Jane Williams (disambiguation) =

Jane Williams (1798–1884) was a British woman and subject of poems by Percy Bysshe Shelley

Jane Williams may also refer to:

- Jane Williams (missionary) (1800–1896), Church Missionary Society missionary in New Zealand
- Jane Williams (silversmith) (died 1845), Irish silversmith
- Jane Williams (theologian) (born 1957), Christian theologian and writer
- Jane Williams (Ysgafell) (1806–1885), Welsh writer
- Jane Williams (EastEnders), fictional character
- Jane Williams, Baroness Williams of Elvel (1929–2023), British personal secretary to Sir Winston Churchill
- Jane Williams-Warren (born 1947), American politician
- Maria Jane Williams (1795–1873), Welsh musician
