= Edward Wynn =

Anglican bishop (1889–1956)

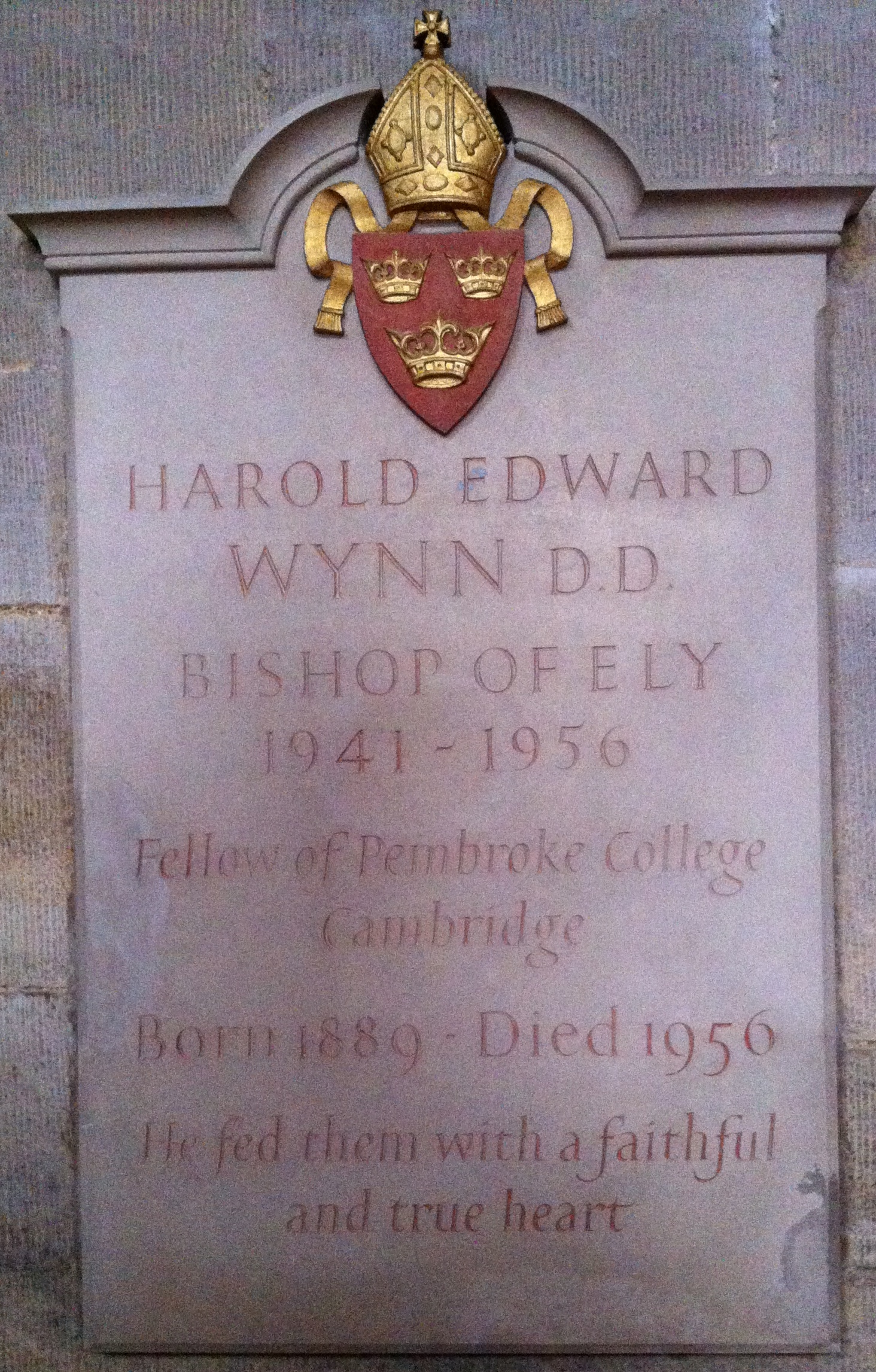
Memorial to Harold Edward Wynn in Ely Cathedral

Harold Edward Wynn OGS (15 January 1889 – 12 August 1956) was an Anglican bishop.

He was born on 15 January 1889 and educated at Mercers' School, London and Trinity Hall, Cambridge. Ordained a priest on Trinity Sunday 1912 (2 June), by Frederic Chase, Bishop of Ely, at Ely Cathedral, his first post was as Chaplain of Jesus College, Cambridge, a period interrupted by World War I service as a Chaplain to the British Armed Forces. He was very young at 25 when he was interviewed for a commission as a chaplain in October 1914, but served successfully in France, Italy and finally, the Army of the Rhine. He was Mentioned in Despatches and awarded the Croce di Guerre, an Italian decoration for meritorious service. He was regarded as "A very capable Chaplain. Has indeed most Valuable Services both on the ministerial and administrative side of Department's work". The choice for Ely in 1941 rested between George Chase, a future Bishop of Ripon and Edward Wynn. Archbishops Lang and Temple preferred Chase. Wynn's outgoing personality had led to perceived drawbacks in his candidature for the post e.g. "... he had never quite grown up and had remained something of a Peter Pan". However, Prime Minister Churchill preferred Wynn and he was consecrated bishop on 25 July 1941.

He died suddenly on 12 August 1956, having proved very popular and acquiring a reputation as "... one of the gentlest and most compassionate of men ... Everybody who knew him well will know how consistently benevolent he always was". Wynn was the first alumnus of Ely Theological College to become a diocesan bishop. There is a commemorative plaque in Ely Cathedral.

Church of England titles
Preceded by Bernard Heywood	Bishop of Ely; 1941–1956	Succeeded by Noel Hudson
