= John Cosin =

English Bishop (1594-1672)

The Right Reverend John Cosin
- Bishop of Durham
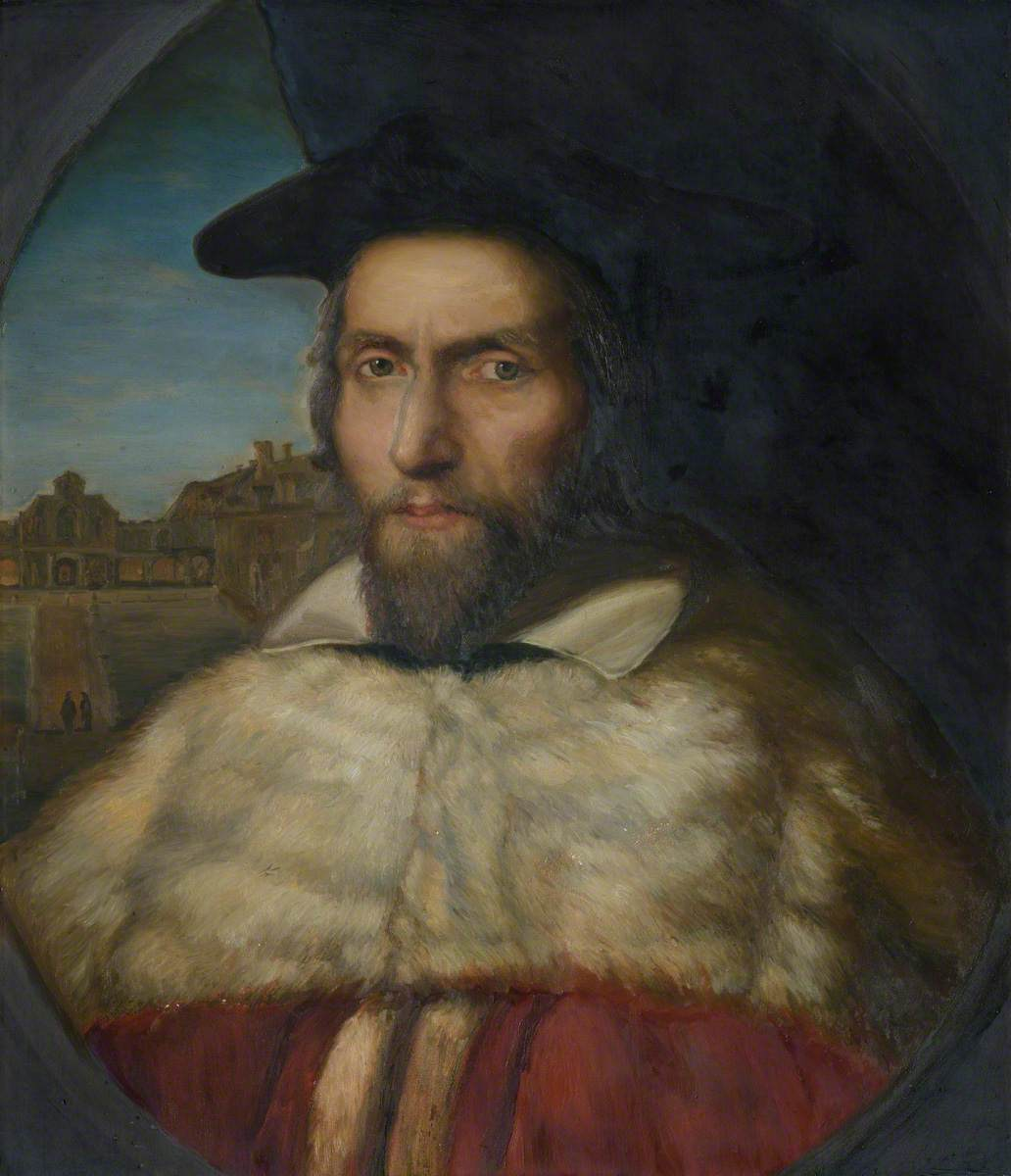
- Diocese: Diocese of Durham
- In office: 1660–1672
- Predecessor: Thomas Morton (before the Interregnum)
- Successor: Nathaniel Crew
- Other posts: Archdeacon of the East Riding (1625–1660); Master of Peterhouse (1635–1643, 1660); Vice-Chancellor of Cambridge University (1639–1640); Dean of Peterborough (November 1640–1660); Master of Peterhouse (1660)

Orders
- Consecration: 2 December 1660 by Accepted Frewen

Personal details
- Born: 30 November 1594 Norwich, Norfolk, England
- Died: 15 January 1672 (aged 77) Westminster, Middlesex, England
- Buried: 29 April 1672, Auckland Castle chapel
- Denomination: Anglican
- Parents: Giles Cosin
- Spouse: Frances (m. 1626–1642)
- Children: 3 sons & 2 daughters
- Profession: theologian, writer
- Education: Norwich Grammar School; Gonville and Caius College, Cambridge

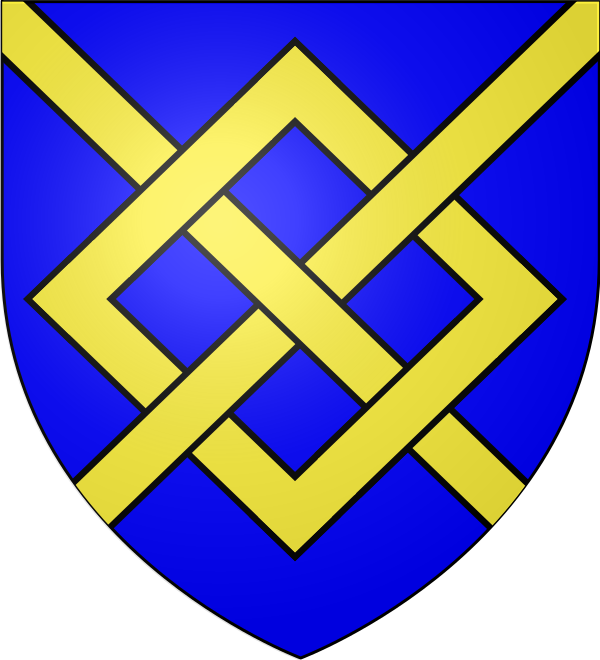
Arms of Cosin: Azure, a fret or

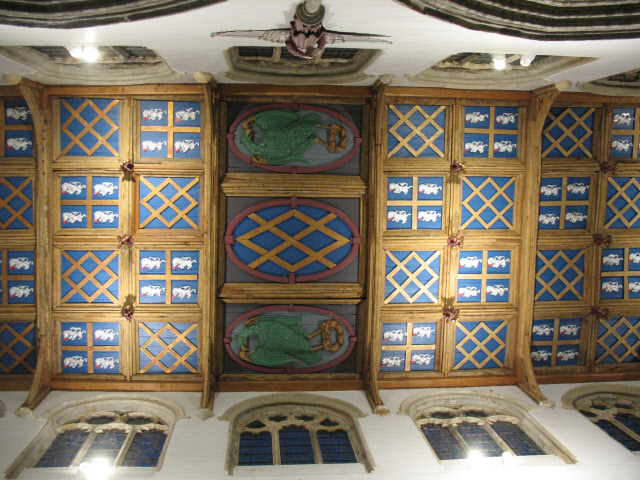
Ceiling showing coats of arms of the See of Durham (Azure, a cross or between four lions rampant argent) and of Bishop John Cosin (Azure, a fret or), Chapel, Auckland Castle

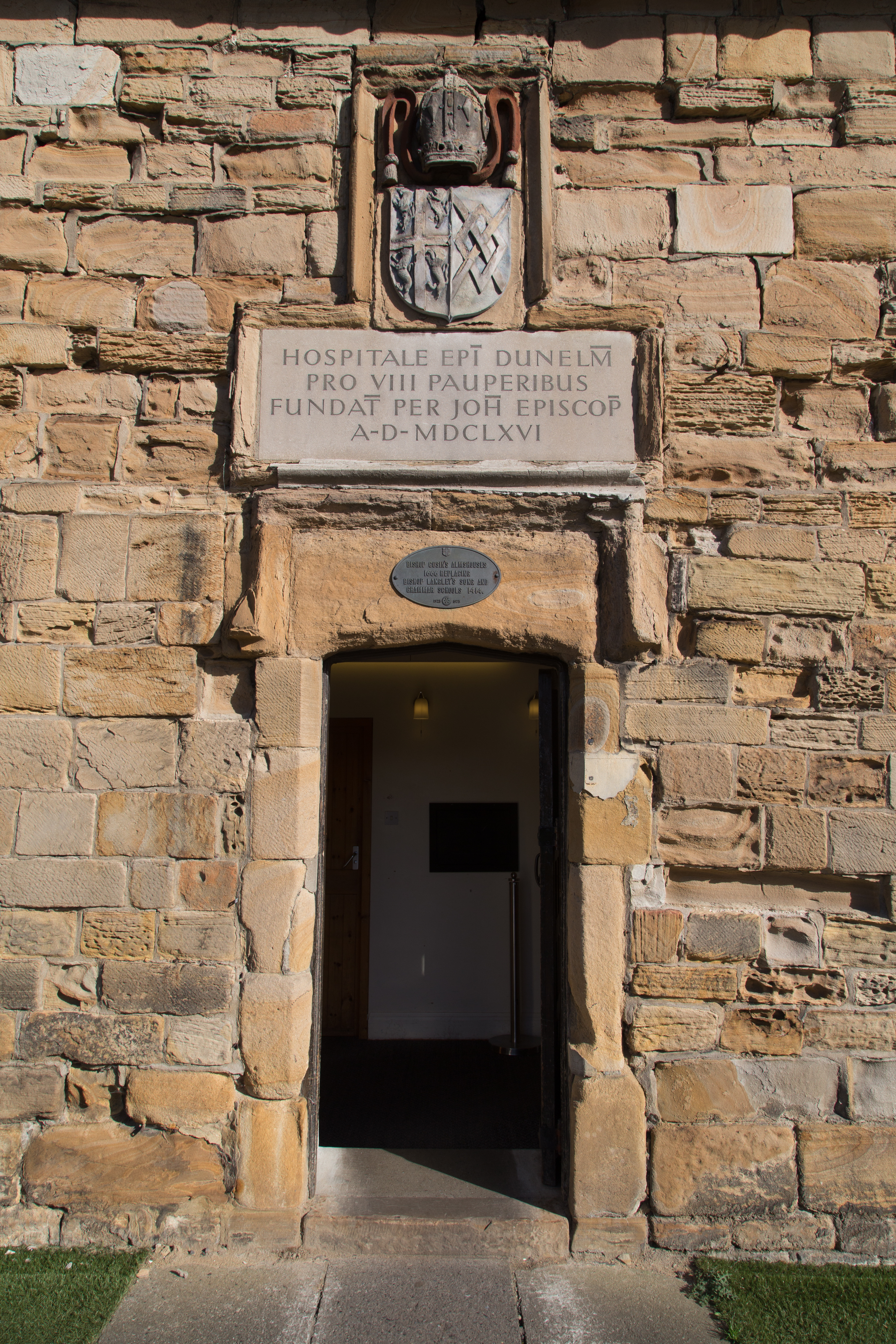
Entrance to almshouses for 8 paupers established in Durham in 1666 by John Cosin, Bishop of Durham. Arms: See of Durham impaling Cosin

John Cosin (30 November 1594 – 15 January 1672) was an English bishop.

== Life ==
He was born at Norwich, and was educated at Norwich School and at Caius College, Cambridge, where he was scholar and afterwards fellow. On taking orders he was appointed secretary to John Overall, Bishop of Lichfield, and then domestic chaplain to Richard Neile, Bishop of Durham. In December 1624 he was made a prebendary of Durham, and on 9 September 1625 Archdeacon of the East Riding of Yorkshire (until 1660).

In 1630 he received his degree of Doctor of Divinity (DD). He first became known as an author in 1627, when he published his Collection of Private Devotions, a manual stated to have been prepared by command of King Charles I, for the use of Queen Henrietta Maria's maids of honour. This book, together with his insistence on points of ritual in his cathedral church and his friendship with William Laud, exposed Cosin to the hostility of the Puritans; and the book was criticised by William Prynne and Henry Burton. In 1628 Cosin took part in the prosecution of a brother prebendary, Peter Smart, for a sermon against high church practices; and the prebendary was deprived.

On 8 February 1635 Cosin was appointed master of Peterhouse, Cambridge; and in 1640 he became vice-chancellor of the university. In October of this year he was promoted to the deanery of Peterborough. A few days before his installation the Long Parliament had met; and among the complainants who hastened to appeal to it for redress was the ex-prebendary, Smart. His petition against the new dean was considered; and early in 1641 Cosin was sequestered from his benefices. Articles of impeachment were presented against him two months later, but he was dismissed on bail. For sending the university plate to the king, he was deprived of the mastership of Peterhouse (13 March 1643). He went to France, preached at Paris, and served as chaplain to some members of the household of the exiled royal family. At the Restoration he returned to England, was reinstated in the mastership (3 August 1660), restored to all his benefices, and in a few months raised to the see of Durham – he therefore resigned from the Mastership of Peterhouse on 18 October 1660.

Cosin noted that Auckland Castle in the town of Bishop Auckland was empty and that its chapel was in ruin; he went on to improve the property, renovating the Great Hall and converting it into a new chapel that still stands today.

He was elected to that See on 5 November, which election was confirmed on 22 November; he was duly consecrated a bishop on 2 December and enthroned on 8 December 1660.

Cosin was responsible for a style of church woodwork unique to County Durham, a sumptuous fusion of gothic and contemporary Jacobean forms. The font cover in Durham Cathedral is an example of this, as are the displays in the churches at Sedgefield and elsewhere. The Cosin woodwork at St Brandon's Church, Brancepeth has been destroyed by fire.

At the convocation in 1661 Cosin played a prominent part in the revision of the Book of Common Prayer, and endeavoured with some success to bring both prayers and rubrics into better agreement with ancient liturgies. Ultimately, his efforts produced the 1662 Book of Common Prayer, established as the authorized liturgical book of the Church of England by the Act of Uniformity 1662. He administered his diocese successfully for eleven years; and used a large share of his revenues to promote the interests of the Church, of schools and of charitable institutions.

He died in London in 1672. He had married Frances (d. 25 March 1642), the daughter of Marmaduke Blakiston on 15 August 1626 at St Margaret's, Durham.

== Attitudes ==
Though a classical high churchman and a rigorous enforcer of outward conformity, Cosin was uncompromisingly hostile to Roman Catholicism, and most of his writings illustrate this antagonism. In France he was on friendly terms with Huguenots, justifying himself on the ground that their non-episcopal ordination had not been of their own seeking, and at the Savoy conference in 1661 he tried hard to effect a reconciliation with the Presbyterians. He differed from the majority of his colleagues in his strict attitude towards Sunday observance and in favouring, in the case of adultery, both divorce and the remarriage of the innocent party.

On a theological point of view, Cosin is considered to be an Arminian anti-Calvinist. In particular, his book of devotions is considered by historians as Arminian and imbued with sacramentalism.

== Writings ==
Among his writings (most of which were published posthumously) are a Historia Transubstantiationis Papalis (1675), Notes and Collections on the Book of Common Prayer (1710) and A Scholastical History of the Canon of Holy Scripture (1657). A collected edition of his works, forming 5 vols of the Oxford Library of Anglo-Catholic Theology, was published between 1843 and 1855; and his Correspondence (2 vols) was edited by George Ornsby for the Surtees Society (1868–1870).

Among his notable work was the translation of "Veni Creator Spiritus" included in the 1662 revision of the Book of Common Prayer; written for the Coronation of King Charles of England, Scotland and Ireland, and sung at every coronation since that time.

1. Come, Holy Ghost, our souls inspire
and lighten with celestial fire;
thou the anointing Spirit art,
who dost thy seven-fold gifts impart.

2. Thy blessed unction from above
is comfort, life, and fire of love;
enable with perpetual light
the dullness of our mortal sight.

3. Teach us to know the Father, Son,
and thee, of both, to be but one,
that through the ages all along
this may be our endless song:

4. Praise to thine eternal merit,
Father, Son, and Holy Spirit.
Amen.

== Library ==
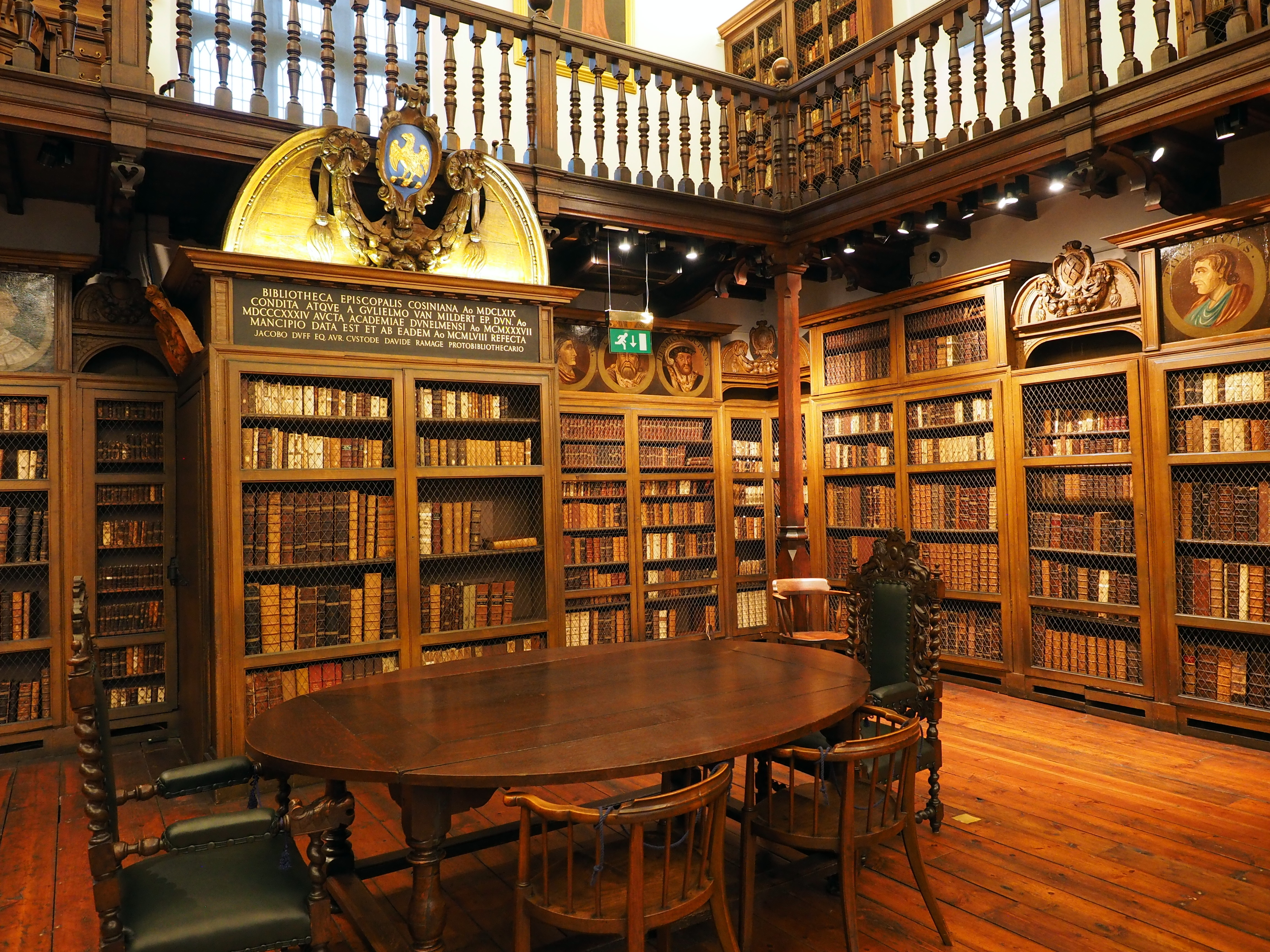
Interior of Cosin's Library September 2022

In 1669 Cosin founded one of the earliest public libraries to give local people access to ‘good books.’ A history of the collection of Cosin's books still in the library notes that it is "one of the most important British centres for the study of older books."

== Notes and references ==
=== Sources ===
- Tyacke, Nicholas (1990). Anti-Calvinists: the rise of English Arminianism, c. 1590-1640. Oxford: Clarendon.
- Cressy, David (2006). England on Edge: Crisis and Revolution 1640-1642. Oxford: Oxford University.

=== Attribution ===
Academic offices
Preceded by Matthew Wren	Master of Peterhouse, Cambridge; 1635–1643	Succeeded by Lazarus Seaman
Preceded by Lazarus Seaman	Master of Peterhouse, Cambridge; 1660	Succeeded by Bernard Hale
Church of England titles
Vacant Title last held by Thomas Morton	Bishop of Durham; 1660–1672	Succeeded by Nathaniel Crew
Honorary titles
Preceded by Thomas Belasyse, 2nd Viscount Fauconberg	Lord Lieutenant of Durham; 1661–1672	Succeeded by in Commission
