= Andy Broom =

Archdeacon of East Riding

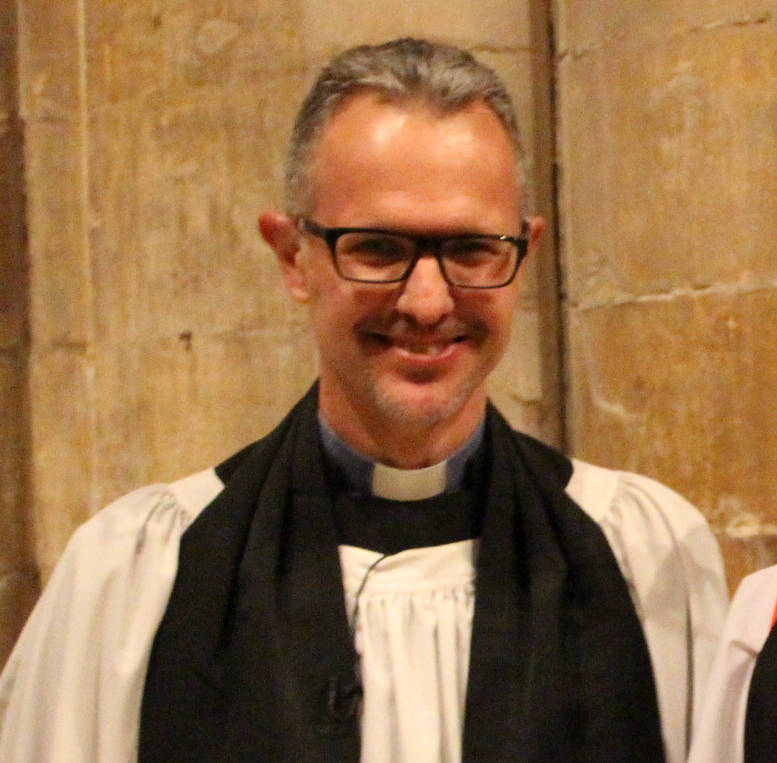
Broom in 2014

Andrew Clifford Broom (born 1965 in Norwich) was Archdeacon of the East Riding from 2014 to 2026.

Initially a Youth worker, Broom was educated at Keele University and Trinity College, Bristol. He was ordained in 1993 and served curacies in Wellington and Brampton. He was Vicar of St John, Walton from 2000 until 2009, and Director of Mission and Ministry for the Diocese of Derby from 2009 until his appointment as Archdeacon.

In June 2026, Broom left his position as Archdeacon to return to parish ministry, becoming of Rector of Howden Minster and the wider Howdenshire Benefice from November 2026. He is succeeded as Archdeacon of the East Riding by the Revd Dr Tim Kelly.

Church of England titles
Preceded by David Butterfield	Archdeacon of the East Riding; 2014–2026	Succeeded by Tim Kelly
