= List of honorary fellows of Magdalene College, Cambridge =

This is a list of Honorary Fellows of Magdalene College, Cambridge.

- Simon Barrington-Ward
- Sir John Boardman
- Benjamin Britten
- Lida Lopes Cardozo Kindersley
- Philip Carne
- Chris von Christierson
- Sir David Clary
- Sir Colin Corness
- Robert Cripps
- Thomas Cripps
- Katie Derham
- Dame Carol Ann Duffy
- T.S. Eliot
- Derek Ezra, Baron Ezra
- Peter Friend
- Bamber Gascoigne
- Prince Richard, Duke of Gloucester
- Sir Christopher Greenwood
- Sir John Gurdon
- Brenda Hale, Baroness Hale of Richmond
- Thomas Hardy
- Seamus Heaney
- Sir David Hopwood
- David Hoyle
- Sir Antony Jay
- Sir Richard Jolly
- Igor Judge, Baron Judge
- Rudyard Kipling
- Kuok Khoon Hong
- Robert Latham
- Timothy Leighton
- C.S Lewis
- Chris Lintott
- Mark Malloch Brown, Baron Malloch-Brown
- Nelson Mandela
- Mark Davis Moorman (MPhil History and Philosophy of Science, Pepys Benefactor Fellow)
- Sir Andrew Morritt
- Denis Murphy
- Mike Newell
- Rosalind Rickaby
- Duncan Robinson
- Raymond Sackler
- Alexander Schultz
- Nazrin Shah of Perak
- John Simpson
- Dame Sarah Springman
- Sir Christopher Staughton
- Amy Tennant
- Sir John Tooley
- Helen Vendler
- Roger Vignoles
- Dame Rachel Whiteread
- The Lady Williams of Oystermouth
- Rowan Williams, Baron Williams of Oystermouth
- Wong Yan-lung
