= Peter Harrison (priest) =

Peter Reginald Wallace Harrison (born 22 June 1939) was Archdeacon of the East Riding from 1999 until 2006.

He was educated at Charterhouse, Selwyn College Cambridge and Ridley Hall Cambridge; and ordained in 1965. After a curacy in Barton Hill, he was involved in Youth Work within the Church of England. He was in London from 1969 to 1977 and then at Mirfield from 1977 to 1984, during which time he oversaw the foundation of the Kirkless Northorpe Barn Project for local young people, and the rebuilding of the parish hall. After this, he was Team Rector of the Drypool Ministry, a post he held until 1999.

Church of England titles
Preceded by Hugh Fletcher Buckingham	Archdeacon of the East Riding; 1999 to 2006	Succeeded by David John Butterfield
