= Charles Long (priest) =

British archdeacon

Charles Maitland Long (born 23 February 1802 in Carshalton – died 6 October 1875 in London) was the Archdeacon of the East Riding from 1854 to 1873.

The son of politician Samuel Long, he was educated at Trinity College, Cambridge. He was ordained in 1827 and held incumbencies at Woodmansterne, Whitchurch, Shropshire, and Settrington.

In 1839, he married Anna Maria Wigram (1812-1856). She was the daughter of Sir Robert Wigram.

Church of England titles
Preceded by Robert Wilberforce	Archdeacon of the East Riding; 1854–1873	Succeeded by Richard Blunt
