= Francis Gurdon =

British Anglican bishop (1861–1929)

- Bishop of Hull
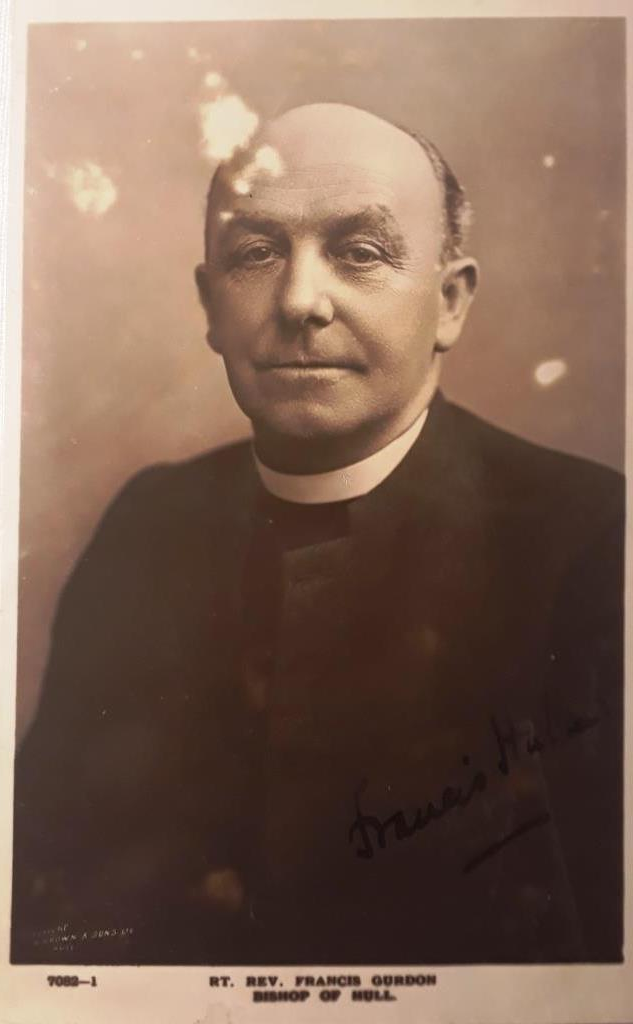
- Postcard photograph of Gurdon, 1913
- Diocese: Diocese of York
- In office: 1913 – July 1929
- Predecessor: John Kempthorne
- Successor: Bernard Heywood (acting, later substantive)
- Other posts: Vicar of Hessle (1913–1917); Canon of York (1917–1929)

Orders
- Ordination: 1885
- Consecration: 29 September 1913 by Cosmo Lang

Personal details
- Born: 11 April 1861 Barnham Broom, Norfolk, England
- Died: 23 December 1929 (aged 68) York, England
- Denomination: Anglican
- Parents: Edward (priest)
- Education: Trinity College, Cambridge

Francis Gurdon (11 April 1861 – 23 December 1929) was an Anglican bishop, the third Bishop of Hull in the modern era.

== Life ==
Francis Gurdon was born on 11 April 1861 at Barnham Broom, the third son of Rev. Edward Gurdon.

His two elder brothers, Edward Temple Gurdon and Charles Gurdon, were both early rugby union internationals, playing for England, and even more remarkably both went on to captain the national side. Like his brothers before him, he was educated at Haileybury and matriculated to Cambridge University. He was at Trinity College, in common with his eldest brother, Edward. He was ordained in 1885; his first post after ordination was as a curate in Isleworth. He held incumbencies at Limehouse, Lancaster Gate and Hessle before elevation to the episcopate as a suffragan to the Archbishop of York. He was appointed Bishop of Hull in September 1913 and consecrated a bishop on Michaelmas Day (29 September) by Cosmo Lang, Archbishop of York, at York Minster. He was, alongside his suffragan-bishopric, installed as Vicar of Hessle on 11 November 1913; in 1917 he resigned that living and became a Canon of York instead (remaining bishop). He resigned his See in ill-health effective 1 July 1929; and died suddenly at York, still in post as Canon-Residentiary, on 23 December 1929.

Church of England titles
| Preceded by John Kempthorne | Bishop of Hull; 1913–1929 | Succeeded by Bernard Heywood (from 1931, but acting since 1929) |
