= Hugh Buckingham =

Archdeacon of the East Riding (born 1932)

Hugh Fletcher Buckingham (born 13 September 1932) was Archdeacon of the East Riding from 1988 to 1998.

He was educated at Lancing College; Hertford College, Oxford; and Westcott House, Cambridge. He was ordained in 1958 before embarking on an ecclesiastical career with curacies in Halliwell and Sheffield. He held incumbencies at Guestwick, Hindolveston and Fakenham before his appointment as Archdeacon.

Church of England titles
Preceded by Michael Vickers	Archdeacon of the East Riding; 1988–1998	Succeeded by Peter Reginald Wallace Harrison
