= Geoffrey Paul =

Geoffrey John Paul (4 March 1921 – 11 July 1983) was the eighth Bishop of Hull in the modern era from 1977 until 1981, who was then translated to Bradford where he served until his death two years later.

Educated at Rutlish School, Queens' College, Cambridge and at King's College London, his first position after ordination was as a curate in Little Ilford. He was then a missionary priest at Palayamkottai and later in Kerala where he was a member of the faculty of the Kerala United Theological Seminary at Kannammoola, eventually becoming the principal from 1961 to 1965.

On returning to England he was a residentiary canon at Bristol Cathedral and then Warden of Lee Abbey before his appointment to the episcopate as a suffragan bishop to the Archbishop of York; he was ordained a bishop on Lady Day 1977 (25 March) by Stuart Blanch, Archbishop of York, at York Minster. He had five daughters: including the theologian Jane Paul, who married the 104th Archbishop of Canterbury, Rowan Williams; as well as the artist Celia Paul.

Church of England titles
| Preceded by Hubert Higgs | Bishop of Hull; 1977–1981 | Succeeded by Donald Snelgrove |
| Preceded by Ross Hook | Bishop of Bradford; 1981–1983 | Succeeded by Roy Williamson |
