= Archdeacon of the East Riding =

Church of England ecclesiastical office

The Archdeacon of the East Riding is a senior ecclesiastical officer of an archdeaconry, or subdivision, of the Church of England Diocese of York in the Province of York. It is named for the East Riding of Yorkshire and consists of the eight rural deaneries of Beverley, Bridlington, Harthill, Howden, Hull, North Holderness, Scarborough and South Holderness.

== History ==
Archdeacons occurred in the Diocese of York before 1093; before 1128, there were five serving simultaneously – probably each in their own area, but none occurs with a territorial title before 1133. The title Archdeacon of the East Riding is first recorded before 1133 with William FitzHerbert, Archdeacon of the East Riding (later Archbishop of York). Of the five archdeaconries, East Riding is one of three which has never split from York diocese.

The archdeaconry is vacant since the resignation of David Butterfield; the acting archdeacon is retired archdeacon Peter Harrison; the suffragan Bishop of Hull exercises episcopal oversight over the archdeaconry. On 28 July 2014, it was announced that Andy Broom is to become the next archdeacon proper.

== List of archdeacons ==
Some archdeacons without territorial titles are recorded from around the time of Thomas of Bayeux; see Archdeacon of York.

=== High Medieval ===
- bef. 1093–bef. 1114 (d.): Ranulph
- bef. 1114–1143 (res.): William of York (William FitzHerbert)
- bef. 1147–1153 (res.): Hugh de Puiset
- bef. 1154–bef. 1162 (res.): John of Canterbury (Bellesmains)
- bef. 1167–1181 (res.): Ralph de Warneville
- 1182–aft. 1189 (res.): Geoffrey (Plantagenet)
- 15 September 1189–aft. 1194: Burchard de Puiset/du Puiset
- 1196–1198 (res.): Eustace
- bef. 1199–bef. 1218 (res.): Hamo (unclear)
- bef. 1218–1227 (d.): Walter de Wisbech
- bef. 1228–aft. 1230: Walter de Taney (later Archdeacon of Nottingham)
- bef. 1235–aft. 1237: Walter de Woburn (later Archdeacon of Richmond)
- bef. 1247–aft. 1261 (res.): Simon of Evesham (afterwards Archdeacon of Richmond)
- bef. 1262–1279 (res.): Robert of Scarborough (afterwards Dean of York)
- 23 January 1280–before 1308 (d.): John de Crowcombe/de Craucombe

=== Late Medieval ===
- c. 1308–bef. 1322 (res.): Bertrand de Fargis
- 1316 (deprived): William de Ayremynne (royal grant)
- 4 May 1322–bef. 1343 (d.): Denis Haverel
- bef. 1343–?: Aymer Cardinal Robert (Adhémar Robert, Cardinal-priest of Sant'Anastasia al Palatino; papal grant)
- 24 August 1343–c. 1352: John de Cestre (royal grant)
- 29 December 1352–bef. 1359 (res.): William de Walcote
- c. 1360–1385 (res.): Walter Skirlaw
- 1364–1370 (res.): John de Hermesthorp (royal grant; ineffective)
- 8 February 1386 – 1389 (deprived): William de Waltham
- 1389–1390 (d.): Francis Cardinal Renzio de Alifia (Francesco Renzio, Cardinal-deacon of Sant'Eustachio)
- 1390–16 April 1396 (d.): Bartholomew Cardinal Oleari OSB (Bartolomeo degli Uliari, Cardinal-priest of Santa Pudenziana; papal grant)
- 1393–23 July 1409 (exch.): William Feryby (royal grant)
- 1396–bef. 1400 (res.): Christopher Cardinal de Maronibus (Cristoforo Maroni, Cardinal-priest of San Ciriaco alle Terme Diocleziane; papal grant)
- 23 July 1409 – 1416 (d.): William de Waltham (again)
- 20 October 1416 – 1418 (res.): Henry Bowet
- 25 September 1418 – 1435 (d.): John Wodham
- 26 March 1435–bef. 1464 (d.): Richard Tone
- 13 March 1464–bef. 1467 (d.): Robert Clifton
- 17 June 1467–bef. 1475 (d.): John Walter
- 14 December 1475 – 1480 (res.): Edmund Audley
- 1480–1485 (res.): Edward Pole (afterwards Archdeacon of Richmond)
- 13 January 1485–bef. 1493 (res.): William Poteman
- 27 March 1493 – 1497: Henry Carnebull (afterwards Archdeacon of York)
- 1497–bef. 1501 (d.): John Hole
- 1 May 1501 – 1504 (res.): Richard Mayew
- 12 June 1504 – 28 August 1550 (d.): Thomas Magnus

=== Early modern ===
- 13 April 1551 – 9 November 1558 (d.): John Dakyn
- 24 November 1558–bef. 1568 (d.): William Rokeby
- bef. 1569–bef. 1569 (d.): Martin Parkinson
- 9 August 1569–bef. 1577 (res.): John May (also Bishop of Carlisle from 1577)
- 31 July 1578: John Gibson
- 10 March 1589–bef. 1615 (d.): Richard Remington
- 24 November 1615–bef. 1625 (res.): Marmaduke Blakiston
- 9 September 1625 – 1660 (res.): John Cosin
- bef. 1661–June 1662 (exch.): Clement Breton (afterwards Archdeacon of Leicester)
- June 1662–bef. 1675 (res.): Robert Hitch (Dean of York from 1664)
- 5 October 1675 – 6 March 1702 (d.): William Brearey
- 7 March 1702 – 8 April 1750 (d.): Heneage Dering
- 20 April 1750 – 30 May 1755 (res.): Jaques Sterne
- 30 May 1755 – 15 November 1784 (d.): Robert Oliver
- 11 December 1784 – 16 February 1786 (d.): Thomas Constable
- 3 March 1786 – 18 August 1828 (d.): Darley Waddilove
- 2 October 1828 – 10 January 1841 (res.): Francis Wrangham
- 14 January 1841 – 12 September 1854 (res.): Robert Wilberforce
- 4 October 1854 – 14 June 1873 (res.): Charles Long

=== Late modern ===
- 1873–1892 (res.): Richard Blunt (also Bishop suffragan of Hull from 1891)
- 1892?–3 June 1898 (d.): James Palmes
- 1898–1916 (ret.): Charles Mackarness
- 1916–1917: Unknown/vacant
- 1917–17 April 1931 (d.): Malet Lambert
- 1931–1934 (res.): Bernard Heywood, Bishop suffragan of Hull
- 1934–1957 (ret.): Henry Vodden, Bishop suffragan of Hull
- 1957–1970 (ret.): Frank Ford (archdeacon emeritus 1974–1976)
- 1970–1981 (res.): Donald Snelgrove
- 1981–1988 (res.): Michael Vickers
- 1988–1998 (ret.): Hugh Buckingham (afterwards archdeacon emeritus)
- 1999–2006 (ret.): Peter Harrison
- February 2007–26 May 2014 (res.): David Butterfield
- 24 June 2014 – 6 October 2014 (Acting): Peter Harrison (again)
- 6 October 2014–present : Andy Broom

== Sources ==
- Greenway, Diana E. (1999), Fasti Ecclesiae Anglicanae 1066–1300, vol. 6, pp. 40–43
- Jones, B. (1963), Fasti Ecclesiae Anglicanae 1300–1541, vol. 6, pp. 22–23
- Joyce M., Horn; Smith, David M. (1975), Fasti Ecclesiae Anglicanae 1541–1857, vol. 4, pp. 16–18
