= Clement Breton =

English priest

Clement Breton D.D. was an English priest in the 17th century.

Breton was born in Uppingham and educated at Sidney Sussex College, Cambridge, He was ordained in 1631 and held the living at Church Langton until his ejection in 1642. He was reinstated in 1660. Breton was Archdeacon of the East Riding from 1661 to 1662; and Archdeacon of Leicester from 1662 until his death in 1669.
