= Richard Remington =

English priest

Richard Remington was an English priest in the late 16th and early 17th centuries.

Remington was born at Garraby and educated at St John's College, Cambridge. he was incorporated at Oxford in 1577. He held livings at Lowthorpe, Brandeston, Bainton and Lockington where he died in 1615. Remington was Archdeacon of Cleveland from 1582 to 1589; and Archdeacon of the East Riding from then until his death.
