= List of collegiate churches in England =

In Western Christianity, a collegiate church is one in which the daily office of worship is maintained collectively by a college of canons; consisting of a number of non-monastic or "secular clergy" commonly organised by foundation statutes into a self-governing corporate body or chapter, presided over by a dean, warden or provost. In its governance and religious observance a collegiate church is similar to a cathedral, although a collegiate church is not the seat of a bishop and has no diocesan responsibilities. As the primary function of collegiate canons was that of corporate worship, a collegiate church differed in principle from an ordinary parish church whose clergy (even when there might be several of them) had as their primary responsibility the parochial cure of souls. Nevertheless, most medieval collegiate churches also served as parish churches, with the parochial benefice commonly appropriated to the college.

All medieval collegiate churches or chapels would have been endowed at their foundation with income-yielding property, commonly rents or parochial tithes. Under their statutes, each canon would be provided with a distinct income for his personal subsistence; and in England this might be achieved in one of three ways; where the endowments were pooled and each canonry derived a fixed proportion of the annual income, they were termed 'portioners'; where each canonry had separate endowments these canonries were termed 'prebends'; and where each canonry was provided in the statutes with a fixed stipend income conditional on maintaining prayers and saying masses for the repose of the founder's family, they were classified as 'fellows' or 'chaplains' within a chantry college. In respect of prebends in particular, it became expected practice in the medieval period for canons to be non-resident, vicars being appointed to maintain corporate worship on their behalf, and these vicarages might be specified in the college statutes. Furthermore, in the later medieval period, developing expectations of corporate worship led to collegiate foundations increasingly making provision for professional choirs of singing men (or clerks) and boy choristers. Where a collegiate foundation had appropriated a parish church, the statutes also commonly provided for a parochial vicar.

Prebends were specific to collegiate and cathedral churches; but priests serving non-collegiate parish churches could still be 'portioners' (where each parish priest held a separate rectory, sharing the rectoral endowments of tithe and glebe). Moreover, almost all larger late medieval parish churches housed numerous chantries, whose priests might be organised into a 'college' even though the parish church itself might not have been legally 'appropriated' for collegiate use; and such arrangements may be difficult to distinguish from full collegiate foundations where an intended appropriation had not been carried through. Consequently, there may now be uncertainty in respect of smaller chantry colleges and portioner churches, whether they were indeed collegiate in the medieval period; an uncertainty that is often present in contemporary accounts, as non-collegiate churches with multiple clergy often adopted the forms of worship, nomenclature and modes of organisation of fully collegiate exemplars.

The general division of collegiate endowments into prebends took place in England around the time of the Norman Conquest; and also around the time of the Conquest in the 11th and 12th centuries, the territory of England was being divided into parishes. Prior to the Conquest, there had been considerable numbers of portioner collegiate churches in England, commonly having developed out of Anglo-Saxon minsters or monasteries, and generally without formal statutes. Some of these late Saxon collegiate churches thereafter adopted statutes as prebendary collegiate churches, some continued as portioner collegiate churches, while many ceased collegiate worship altogether, becoming ordinary parish churches. A number were refounded as regular monasteries. Subsequent new collegiate foundations might construct their own dedicated chapel or church, or otherwise might seek to appropriate an existing parish church; although it was not uncommon for such intended appropriations to be stalled, such that the collegiate body then co-existed with a continuing parochial rectory. Consequently, it is not unknown for a collegiate foundation to appropriate the rectory of one parish church; while nevertheless maintaining collegiate worship within another, non-appropriated, church. The majority of these new collegiate foundations were as chantry colleges. The academic colleges of Oxford and Cambridge universities (which developed out of chantry colleges) initially tended to conduct collegiate worship in parish churches in the town, subsequently moving into dedicated chapels.

In the years immediately following the Dissolution of the Monasteries the heads of many English collegiate churches saw it as expedient to surrender their colleges to the crown. Those that did not offer voluntary surrender were mostly compulsorily dissolved by Edward VI in his Abolition of Chantries Act 1547. A few colleges survived the Reformation, specifically the academic colleges, those under the jurisdiction of the monarch, and others who by one device or another escaped the terms of the Tudor legislation. These latter continued until abolished, alongside other sinecures, by the Ecclesiastical Commissioners Act 1840 (3 & 4 Vict. c. 113). Eleven former monasteries in England had been refounded under Henry VIII as collegiate churches or cathedrals; some of these were shortly dissolved by Edward VI, others continued. After the Reformation almost all dissolved collegiate churches, including those that had been non-parochial, continued as parish churches and remain so to this day. The commissioners for suppression appointed under the Chantries Act 1547 had been empowered to apply tithes, pensions and annuities so as to establish vicarages in former collegiate churches to provide for cure of souls and maintain parochial worship. Where a collegiate foundation's statutes already provided for a parochial vicar, these continued; but otherwise portions of the tithe sufficient for a competent vicarage might abstracted from the collegiate endowments, the rest being sold to lay impropriators; or otherwise the impropriator might be constrained to establish the vicarage as a perpetual curacy.

== Present-day non-academic collegiate churches ==
Image	Name & dedication	Diocese	Information	Established/website
	St Endellion Church, Cornwall The Collegiate Church of Saint Endelienta	Diocese of Truro	Founded with four prebends in the 13th century, and (due to legislative oversight) never subsequently dissolved, so prebends continued as sinecures until 1880. Current statutes provided in 1929 when the Bishop of Truro re-established the chapter	before 1288 (re-established 1929) Church Homepage
	Westminster Abbey; The Collegiate Church of St Peter at Westminster	Royal Peculiar	Benedictine monastery, consecrated in 1065 during the reign of King Edward the Confessor. A cathedral from 1540 to 1550. Mary I reestablished it as a monastery until 1559; Elizabeth I established it as a collegiate church in 1560	1065 Abbey Homepage
	St George's Chapel, Windsor Castle The Queen's Free Chapel of the College of St. George, Windsor Castle	Royal Peculiar	Founded by Edward III on 6 August 1348	1348 St. George's

== Academic collegiate churches ==
- King's College Chapel, Cambridge, 1441, continuing
- Christ's College, Cambridge, 1448, continuing
- Eton College, St Mary, Eton, Buckinghamshire (now Berkshire), 1440, chantry and school, continuing
- Oxford, All Souls College, 1438, chantry priests
- Oxford, New College, 1379
- Winchester College of St Mary, Winchester, Hampshire, 1382

== Former collegiate churches ==
- Arundel, Sussex, 1380–1544, chantry college of master, twelve chaplains, two deacons, two sub-deacons and four choristers; previously a Benedictine priory, non-parochial until the 18th century.
- Ashford, Kent, 1467–1503?, chantry college of master, two chaplains and two clerks; not appropriated.
- Attleborough, Norfolk, 1405–1540, chantry college of master and four fellows; not appropriated.
- Auckland St Andrew, Durham, 1292–1548, prebendary college; of dean, twelve canons and twelve vicars, appropriated.
- Babbelak, Coventry, Warwickshire, 1344–1548, chantry college of master and nine priests; non-parochial until the 18th century.
- Battlefield, Shropshire, 1410–1548, chantry college for master and five chaplains; appropriated.
- Bere Ferrers, Devon, 1330–1546, chantry college of archpriest, four chaplains and a deacon, appropriated.
- Beverley, Yorkshire, c. 934–1548, pre-Conquest portioner college, of eight canons (but no dean), nine vicars, ten clerks, eight choristers and about fifteen chantry priests; became parochial at the Reformation.
- Bosham, Sussex, pre-Conquest college refounded as prebendary in 1121 and dissolved in 1548; dean and six canons; appropriated.
- Bridgnorth, Shropshire, 1101–1548, college of prebends established within Bridgnorth castle, dean and five canons; became parochial in 1330, appropriated.
- Bristol, All Saints, c. 1370-1548, prior and three priests serving the Guild of Kalendars; reorganised in 1464 to provide a free public library, not appropriated.
- Bromyard, Hereford. Pre-Conquest minster with three portioners and a vicar; survived the Reformation as sinecures but dissolved in 1840.
- Bunbury, Cheshire, 1387–1548, chantry college of warden and seven chaplains; appropriated.
- Chester-le-Street, Durham, 1286–1547, college of prebends with dean, seven prebendaries and seven vicars; appropriated.
- Chester, St John's, Cheshire, pre-Conquest prebendary college, 1057–1547, cathedral from 1075 to 1102, dean, seven canons, seven vicars, two clerks and four choristers; appropriated.
- Chulmleigh, Devon, 13th century, Rector and five prebendaries, not dissolved in 1547 such that prebends continued as sinecures to 1840; appropriated.
- Cotterstock, Northamptonshire, 1339–1546, chantry college of provost, twelve chaplains and two clerks; appropriated.
- Crantock, Cornwall, pre-Conquest, refounded as prebendary college 1236 and 1351 with Provost, nine canons and four vicars choral; appropriated.
- Crediton, Devon, pre-Conquest monastic cathedral, refounded in 1050 with prebends, twelve canons, four singing men and four choristers; became parochial at the Reformation.
- Darlington, Durham, c. 1165–1550, founded as a college of portioners, refounded in 1439 as dean and four prebends; appropriated.
- Derby, All Saints, c. 943–1548, pre-Conquest prebendary college, sub-dean and six canons (the Deanery being appropriated to Lincoln Cathedral; cathedral since 1927, appropriated.
- Derby, St Alkmund, pre-Conquest prebendary college of six canons, absorbed into the college of All Saints in the 13th century; remained parochial.
- Fotheringhay, Northamptonshire, 1410–1548, Chantry college of master, twelve fellows, eight clerks and thirteen choristers; appropriated.
- Glasney College, Penryn, Cornwall, 1265, provost and twelve canons, non-parochial church with no surviving remains, prebends
- Gnossall, Staffordshire, pre-Conquest minster, college of four portioners and four vicars, dissolved in 1546; appropriated.
- Greystoke, Cumbria, 1382–1548, Chantry college of provost and six chaplains; not appropriated.
- Haccombe, Devon 1335–1545, chantry college of Archpriest and five priests.
- Hemingborough, Yorkshire, 1426–1545, chantry college of provost, three prebendaries, six vicars and six clerks, appropriated.
- Heytesbury, Wiltshire, c. 1155–1840, prebendary college of dean, four prebends and four vicars; the dean being always Dean of Salisbury Cathedral and appointing prebends in his gift; not dissolved in 1547 such that prebends continued as sinecures to 1840; appropriated.
- Howden, Yorkshire, 1267–1548, prebendary college of six prebends, six vicars and five chantry priests; appropriated.
- Irthlingborough, Northamptonshire, 1388–1547; prebendary college of dean, five canons and four clerks; appropriated.
- Kirkoswald, Cumbria, 1523–1547 (the last chantry founded in England), chantry college of provost and five chaplains, appropriated.
- Lanchester, Durham, 1284–1548, prebendary college for dean, seven prebendaries and nine vicars; appropriated.
- Leicester, Church of St Mary de Castro, Leicester, 1107–1548, founded as a prebendary college, then reduced in 1147 to portioners, dean and seven portioners; appropriated.
- Leicester, Church of the Annunciation of Our Lady of the Newarke (or St Mary in The Newarke), 1356–1548, portioner college of dean, twelve canons and thirteen vicars; non-parochial, proposed as a possible cathedral for Leicester in 1538, but eventually demolished. Both Leicester churches were connected with Leicester Castle. The Newarke ("new work") church was a Lancastrian foundation of great importance.
- Lingfield, Surrey, 1431–1544, chantry college of master, six chaplains and four clerks; appropriated.
- London, St Martin-le-Grand, 1056–1542, prebendary college for dean, nine canons and eight vicars; non-parochial, it was demolished in 1547.
- Lowthorpe, Yorkshire, 1333–1548, chantry college of rector, six priests and three deacons; appropriated.
- Maidstone, Kent, All Saints, 1395–1547, chantry college of master, twelve chaplains and twelve clerks; appropriated.
- Manchester, St Mary St Denys and St George, 1421–1847, chantry college of a warden, eight fellows, four clerks and six choristers; college dissolved in 1547 but refounded in 1557, cathedral since 1847; appropriated.
- Mettingham, Suffolk, 1394–1542, Chantry college of master and twelve fellows in private chapel within Mettingham Castle; non-parochial.
- Middleham, Yorkshire, 1478–1845, chantry college for dean, six chaplains, four clerks, six choristers and a clerk sacristan; founded by the future King Richard III, most endowments were confiscated after his death in 1485, but the college, as a royal foundation, survived the Reformation with just the dean and clerk sacristan. An attempt by the then dean to revive the college in 1839 with six canons was terminated by parliamentary dissolution.
- Newport, Shropshire, 1442–1547, Chantry college of master and four chaplains; appropriated.
- Northill, Bedfordshire, 1405–1547, chantry college of master, four fellows and two choristers; appropriated.
- Norton, Durham, 1083–1548, portioner college of vicar and eight canons; appropriated.
- Norwich, St Mary-in-the-Fields, 1248–1544, hospital college of dean and eight prebendaries; non-parochial.
- Ottery St Mary, Devon, 1337–1545, prebendary college of warden, eight canons, eight vicars, ten clerks and eight choristers; appropriated.
- Penkridge, Staffordshire, pre-Conquest minster refounded with dean, seven prebends, six vicars and two chantry priests; dissolved in 1548; appropriated.
- Probus, Cornwall, pre-Conquest, dean and five canons, portioners
- Ripon, Yorks, pre-Conquest, canons; college refounded 1604, cathedral since 1836
- Rushford, Norfolk, 1342, chantry priests
- St Buryan, Cornwall, pre-Conquest, refounded 1238, deans and three canons, prebends
- St Michael Penkevil, Cornwall, 1319, archpriest and four chaplains, chantry college
- St Edmund, Salisbury, 1269, provost and priests; 15th-century church is now an arts centre
- Shrewsbury, Shropshire, St Chad, pre-Conquest, deans and canons
- Shrewsbury, St Mary, pre-Conquest, deans and canons
- Sibthorpe, Nottinghamshire, 1335, chantry priests
- Shottesbrooke, Berkshire, 1337, warden and five chaplains, chantry college
- South Malling, Sussex, 1150, Deans and canons
- Southwell, Nottinghamshire, pre-Conquest, canons; college refounded 1557, cathedral since 1884
- Spilsby, Lincolnshire, 1347, canons
- Stafford, St Mary, pre-Conquest, canons
- Stoke-by-Clare, Suffolk, 1415, chantry priests
- Stratford-upon-Avon, Warwickshire, 1415, chantry priests
- Tamworth, Staffordshire, St Editha, pre-Conquest, canons
- Tattershall, Lincolnshire, 1439, chantry priests
- Thornton, Lincolnshire, 1540, deans and canons
- Tiverton, Devon, c. 1290, portioners
- Tong, Shropshire, 1410, chantry priests
- Wallingford, Oxfordshire, late 11th century and refounded 1278, dean and six chaplains, non-parochial chapel in castle with fragmentary remains, chantry college
- Warwick, St Mary, 1123, deans and canons
- Westbury-on-Trym, Gloucestershire, 1190, deans and canons
- Westminster, St Stephen's, 1348, deans and canons
- Wimborne, Dorset, pre-Conquest, deans and canons
- Windsor, St Edward, 1248, chantry priests, replaced by St George in 1348
- Wingham, Kent, 1287, canons
- Wolverhampton, Staffordshire, pre-Conquest, deans and canons
- Wye, Kent, 1432, 1447, chantry priests

== See also ==
- Collegiate church
- List of cathedrals in the United Kingdom
