= Robert Oliver (priest) =

English priest (1710-1784)

Robert Oliver (15 June 1710 – 15 November 1784) was Archdeacon of the East Riding from 1759 until his death.

He was educated at Merton College, Oxford. On his appointment as Archdeacon he commented "Silence would best become me."

Church of England titles
Preceded by Jaques Sterne	Archdeacon of the East Riding; 1755–1784	Succeeded by Thomas Constable
