= George Townley =

Anglican bishop

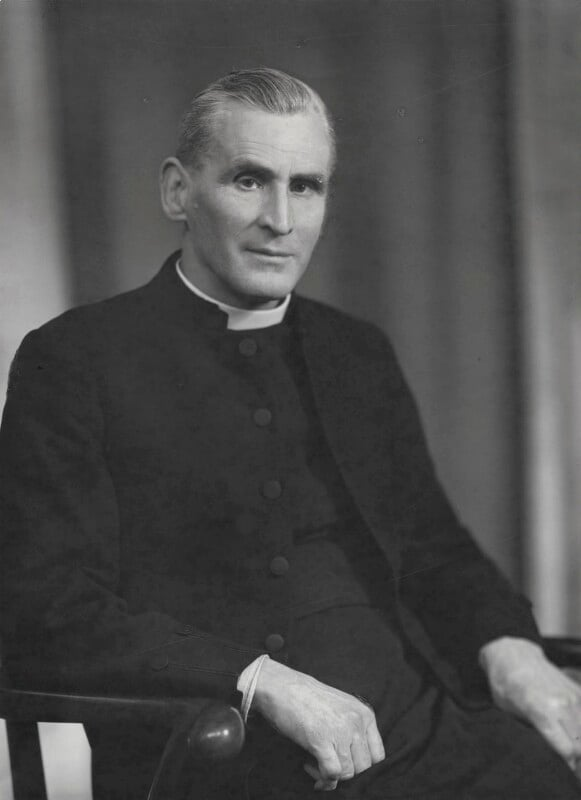
Townley in 1950

George Frederick Townley (15 April 1891 Earls Barton Northamptonshire – 9 March 1977) was the sixth Bishop of Hull in the modern era, serving from 1957 until 1965.

He was educated at Lincoln College, Oxford. His first post after World War I service was as a curate in Keighley. He was then Vicar of Lidget Green, Bradford and then of Linthorpe, Middlesbrough, Rural Dean of Scarborough, Archdeacon of Cleveland and finally Archdeacon of York before elevation to the episcopate as a Suffragan to the Archbishop of York.

He died on 9 March 1977. Papers relating to Townley (his ordination and preferments) are held by the Borthwick Institute in York.

== Notes ==
Church of England titles
Preceded by Henry Townsend Vodden	Bishop of Hull; 1957–1965	Succeeded by Hubert Laurence Higgs
