= Hubert Higgs =

Anglican Bishop (1911–1992)

The Right Reverend Hubert Laurence Higgs
- Bishop of Hull
- Church: Church of England
- Diocese: Diocese of York
- In office: 1965–1977
- Predecessor: George Frederick Townley
- Successor: Geoffrey Paul

Orders
- Ordination: (date not specified)
- Consecration: 1965

Personal details
- Born: November 23, 1911
- Died: January 4, 1992 (aged 80)
- Denomination: Anglican
- Education: Christ's College, Cambridge

Hubert Laurence Higgs (23 November 1911 – 4 January 1992) was the seventh Anglican Bishop of Hull in the modern era (from 1965 until 1977).

== Life ==
Higgs was educated at University College School and Christ's College, Cambridge. His first post after ordination was as a curate at Holy Trinity, Richmond. He was then Vicar of Holy Trinity, Aldershot, Rural Dean of Woking and finally Archdeacon of Bradford before elevation to the episcopate as a suffragan to the Archbishop of York.

Church of England titles
Preceded by George Frederick Townley	Bishop of Hull; 1965–1977	Succeeded by Geoffrey Paul
