= Samuel Long (MP) =

English Member of Parliament

Samuel Long (16 August 1746 – 19 October 1807), of Carshalton, Surrey, was an English member of parliament.

The son of Beeston Long, a West India Merchant and deputy Governor of the Royal Exchange Assurance Corporation, and brother of Beeston Long jnr. and Charles Long, 1st Baron Farnborough, Long married in 1787 Lady Jane Maitland, 4th daughter of James Maitland, 7th Earl of Lauderdale. Three years later in 1790, Long was elected to Parliament as member for Ilchester. He was appointed High Sheriff of Surrey the same year.

Long and his wife had a daughter and two sons: Lt. Col. Samuel Long (m. Louisa Emily, 2nd daughter of Edward Smith-Stanley, 13th Earl of Derby, and Archdeacon Charles Maitland Long. After his death at their London residence in Berkeley Square in 1807, his widow remarried a year later to Sir William Houston, 1st Baronet.
