= Donald Snelgrove =

- Bishop of Hull
- Diocese: Diocese of York
- In office: 1981–1994
- Predecessor: Geoffrey Paul
- Successor: James Jones
- Other posts: Honorary assistant bishop in Lincoln (1994–2016); Archdeacon of the East Riding (1970–1981)

Orders
- Consecration: c. 1981

Personal details
- Born: 21 April 1925
- Died: 19 May 2016 (aged 91)
- Denomination: Anglican
- Education: Queens' College, Cambridge

Donald George Snelgrove (21 April 1925 – 19 May 2016) was the Suffragan Bishop of Hull from 1981 until 1994.

He was educated at Queens' College, Cambridge. After World War II service with the RNVR and a period of study at Ridley Hall, Cambridge he embarked on an ecclesiastical career with curacies at St Thomas Oakwood, London and St Anselm, Hatch End after which he was Vicar of St John the Baptist's Church, Dronfield. Following this he was Vicar of Hessle and then (his final appointment before elevation to the episcopate) Archdeacon of the East Riding, a post he initially held whilst also serving as Rector of Cherry Burton (1970–79).

Snelgrove was Bishop of Hull (a suffragan bishop in the Diocese of York) from 1981 until his 1994 retirement. In retirement he continued to serve the Church as an Assistant Bishop within the Diocese of Lincoln.

Snelgrove died on 19 May 2016 at the age of 91.
