= William Brearey =

English Anglican priest (1645–1702)

William Brearey (19 April 1645 – 6 March 1702) was Archdeacon of the East Riding from 1675 until his death.

Brearey was born in York and educated at Sidney Sussex College, Cambridge. He held livings at Adel and Guiseley.
