= Bishop of Hull =

Suffragan bishop in the Church of England

The Bishop of Hull is an episcopal title used by a suffragan bishop of the Church of England Diocese of York, England. The suffragan bishop, along with the Bishop of Selby and the Bishop of Whitby, assists the Archbishop of York in overseeing the diocese.

The title takes its name after the city of Kingston upon Hull and was first created under the Suffragan Bishops Act 1534. Today, the Bishop of Hull is responsible for the Archdeaconry of the East Riding.

Not to be confused with the Roman Catholic Bishop of Hull, the bishop of a Diocese in Canada founded in 1963, currently the Roman Catholic Archdiocese of Gatineau.

== List of bishops ==
Bishops of Hull
From	Until	Incumbent	Notes
1538	1559	Robert Pursglove	Consecrated on 29 December 1538; deprived 1559.
1559	1891	in abeyance	
1891	1910	Richard Blunt	
1910	1913	John Augustine Kempthorne	Translated to Lichfield
1913	1929	Francis Gurdon	
1929	1931	no appointment; though Heywood exercised oversight as Assistant Bishop	
1931	1934	Bernard Heywood	Previously Assistant Bishop of York (overseeing the East Riding, effectively the same role); translated to Ely
1934	1957	Henry Vodden	
1957	1965	George Townley	
1965	1977	Hubert Higgs	
1977	1981	Geoffrey Paul	Translated to Bradford
1981	1994	Donald Snelgrove	
1994	1998	James Jones	Translated to Liverpool
1998	17 October 2014	Richard Frith	Translated to Hereford
3 July 2015	2022	Alison White	Consecrated 3 July 2015. Retired 25 February 2022.
Sep 2022	present	Eleanor Sanderson	Translated 22 September 2022.
