= Thomas Constable =

Thomas Constable (21 July 1737, Beverley – 16 February 1786, Sigglesthorne) was Archdeacon of the East Riding from 11 December 1784 until his death.

He was educated at St John's College, Cambridge; and ordained in 1763. He held livings at Stonegrave, North Yorkshire and Hindolveston, Norfolk.

Church of England titles
Preceded by Robert Oliver	Archdeacon of the East Riding; 1784–1786	Succeeded by Darley Waddilove
