= John of Howden =

English Franciscan friar (fl. 1268/9–1275)

John of Howden OFM (fl. 1268/9–1275), also known as John of Hoveden, was a 13th-century English Franciscan friar from the north of England, and for a time was chaplain to Queen Eleanor of Provence, wife of King Henry III of England.

== Works ==
John is known only by the various spiritual writings attributed to him. There are certain texts in Latin, including Philomena (The Nightingale) (the influence of which may be seen in Richard Rolle's Incendium amoris and Melos amoris); Canticum amoris (Song of Love); Cythara (Cittern); Quinquaginta cantica, Quinquaginta salutationes (Fifty Songs; Fifty Salutations), and several other shorter Latin poems.

There are also works written in Anglo-Norman. One, Li Rossignos (The Nightingale) is a re-working of Howden's own Latin Philomena, with borrowings from the anonymous Desere iam anima (Abandon Now O Soul). Internal evidence suggests the poem was written before 1282.

For a long time, it has been assumed that he was the John of Howden who was prebendary of the church of Howden in Yorkshire. Recently, however, this has been questioned. The prebendary has been identified with Master John of London, canon of Auckland and sometime master of Kepier Hospital in Durham and a noted student of astrology, who was appointed first (or senior) prebendary of Howden minster before 1268. He died in 1272.
