= John Kempthorne (bishop) =

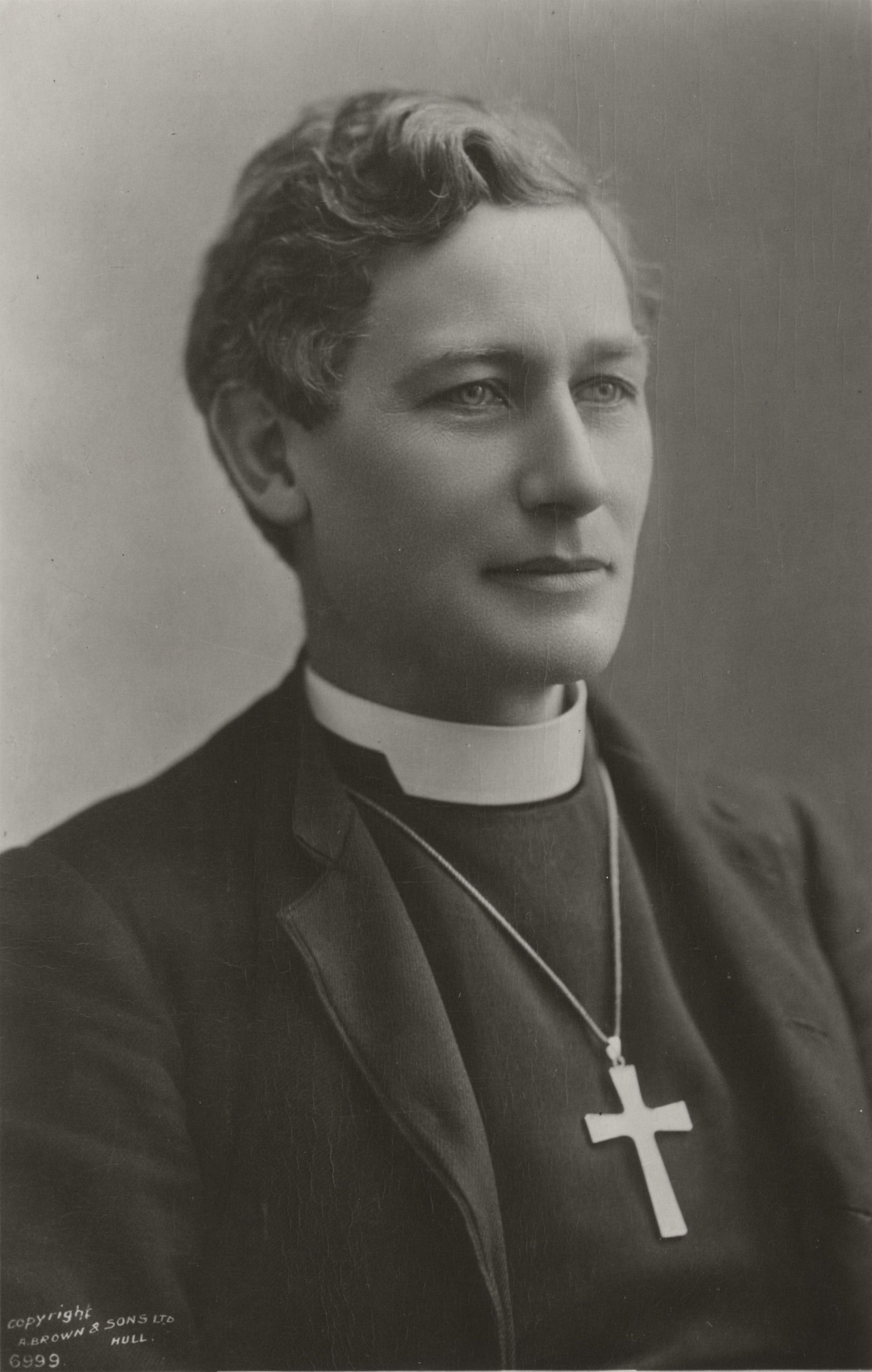
J.A. Kempthorne

John Augustine Kempthorne (26 May 1864, London – 24 February 1946, Trumpington, Cambridgeshire) was an Anglican Bishop in the first half of the twentieth century.

John Augustine Kempthorne was the son of the Rev. John Kempthorne (1835–1880), Vicar of Trumpington. He was educated at Haileybury and Trinity College, Cambridge, achieving a 1st class degree in Classical Tripos in 1886, and a Master's degree in 1890. His first post after ordination was as a curate at St Aidan’s, Gateshead. He then held incumbencies at Rochdale, Sunderland, Liverpool, and Hessle, before elevation to the episcopate in March 1910 as Bishop of Hull, a Suffragan to the Archbishop of York. He was appointed the 93rd Bishop of Lichfield in May 1913, and retired in 1937.

A Christian pacifist, Kempthorne believed war was inconsistent with Christianity. The weekend before the start of the First World War he had attended a conference in Kinstanz, Germany, as part of a world alliance for promoting friendship through churches. Whilst he was prepared to work for peace, his pacifism did not extend to rejection of the war, given the UK's obligations to Belgium. He did, however, preach several times about the need to avoid reprisals. Generally, nevertheless, he was strongly in support of the First World War even though he recognised its potential for devastation. ‘Civilised Europe is at war, and it may well prove to be the most terrible war known to history .... It may well be that the list of casualties will be terrible.’ He believed that Britain and her allies were engaged in a righteous cause. He wrote ‘Surely we are not moved by hatred, nor lust of power, nor greed of gain. We stand for loyalty to our engagements, for the protection of weaker peoples, for the liberty of Europe.’ He noted that Christian leaders of Germany were also confident of the rightness of their cause. Throughout the War, despite the casualties, Kempthorne preached in favour of victory as against a peace agreement. ‘ ... we cannot rest until tyranny is overthrown .... we cannot flinch. An uncertain and inconclusive peace would only leave the world in worse case than before.’

Kempthorne had married in 1890, Hester Mary was the daughter of John Peile, the master of Christ's College, Cambridge. Also Kempthorne was appointed Military chaplain in 1912 for the Territorial Force. He died on 24 February 1946.

Church of England titles
Preceded by Richard Augustus Lefevre Blunt	Bishop of Hull; 1910–1913	Succeeded by Francis Gurdon
Preceded by Augustus Legge	Bishop of Lichfield; 1913–1937	Succeeded by Edward Sydney Woods
