= Bernard Heywood =

Church of England bishop (1871–1960)

- Bishop of Ely
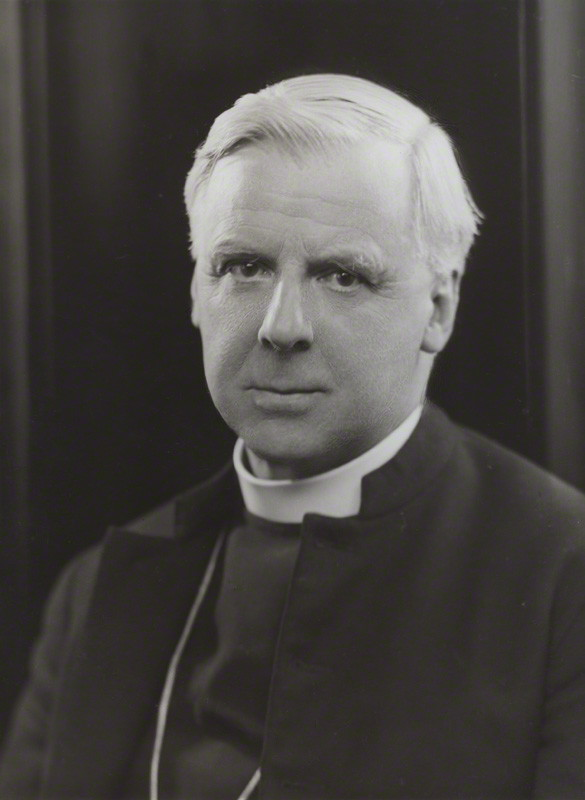
- Heywood as Bishop of Ely, 1935
- Diocese: Diocese of Ely
- In office: 1934–1940/1
- Predecessor: Leonard White-Thomson
- Successor: Edward Wynn

Orders
- Ordination: 1894 (deacon); 1895 (priest) by James Moorhouse
- Consecration: 25 March 1926 by Randall Davidson

Personal details
- Born: 1 March 1871
- Died: 13 March 1960 (aged 89) Winslow, Buckinghamshire, UK
- Denomination: Anglican
- Parents: Henry (priest)
- Spouse: Marion Maude
- Children: seven
- Education: Trinity College, Cambridge

Bernard Oliver Francis Heywood (1 March 1871 – 13 March 1960) was a bishop in the Church of England.

== Family and education ==
Heywood was born into a distinguished ecclesiastical family, the sixth son of Henry Robinson Heywood, priest and honorary canon of Manchester Cathedral. Bernard married Marion Maude and they had five sons and two daughters. He was educated at Sunningdale School, then Harrow School and Welldon. He went to Trinity College, Cambridge and graduated in 1892.

== Ministry ==
He was made deacon in the Church of England on Trinity Sunday 1894 (20 May) and ordained priest the following Trinity Sunday (9 June 1895) — both times by James Moorhouse, Bishop of Manchester, at Manchester Cathedral. He was Vicar of St Paul's Church, Bury from 1897 to 1906; Vicar of St Peter's Church, Swinton from 1906 to 1916; and Vicar of Leeds Parish Church from 1916 to 1926.

In January 1926, Heywood's nomination to become the next Bishop of Southwell was approved; since that diocese had no Dean and Chapter at the time, his appointment was effected not by election but by letters patent dated 1 February and he was consecrated a bishop on Lady Day (25 March), by Randall Davidson, Archbishop of Canterbury, at Westminster Abbey. He served that diocese until ill-health necessitated his resignation, which was accepted before 11 May 1928.

From June 1929 onwards, Heywood served as an Assistant Bishop of York with oversight of the East Riding (Francis Gurdon, Bishop of Hull, resigned in ill-health effective 1 July 1929) Heywood himself was then appointed to succeed Gurdon as suffragan Bishop of Hull in July 1931 and Archdeacon of the East Riding the same year. He served in both posts until 1934, when he became Bishop of Ely, retiring (again in ill health) in 1940/41.

From October 1942 to 1951 he was Assistant Bishop of St Albans. Heywood died in Winslow, Buckinghamshire, to where he had retired in 1951.

== Works ==
- The Bible Day by Day
- This is our Faith

Church of England titles
Preceded by Edwyn Hoskyns	Bishop of Southwell; 1926–1928	Succeeded by Henry Mosley
Preceded by Francis Gurdon	Bishop of Hull; 1931–1934	Succeeded by Henry Vodden
Preceded by Leonard White-Thomson	Bishop of Ely; 1934–1940	Succeeded by Edward Wynn
