= John Gibson (priest) =

English priest

John Gibson was an English priest in the late 16th and early 17th centuries.

Gibson educated at Lincoln College, Oxford, graduating BA in 1570: he was a Fellow there from 1571 to 1583. He was appointed a Canon of York in 1571 and Precentor in 1574. In Le Neve-Hardy (Note: J. Le Neve, Fasti Ecclesiae Anglicanae, corrected by T. D. Hardy. 3 vols. Oxford, 1854) he is erroneously recorded as being the Archdeacon of the East Riding. He died on 28 February 1613.
