= Augustus Legge =

British bishop

The Right Reverend and Honourable Augustus Legge
- Bishop of Lichfield
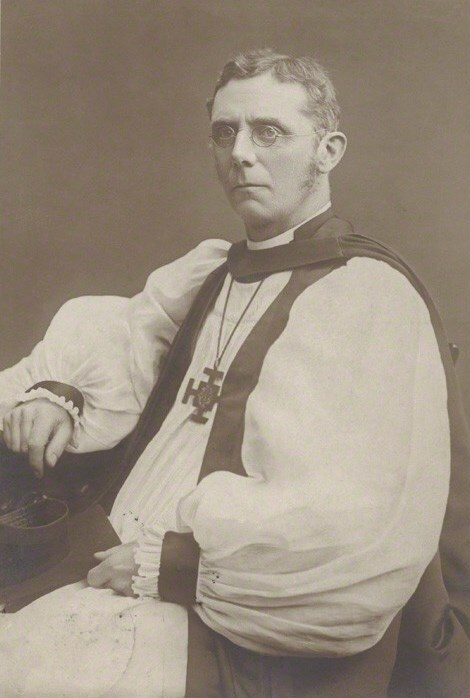
- Province: Canterbury
- Diocese: Lichfield
- In office: 1891–1913
- Predecessor: William Maclagan
- Successor: John Kempthorne
- Other posts: Vicar of Sydenham (1867–1879); Vicar of Lewisham (1879–1891)

Orders
- Ordination: 1864
- Consecration: 1891

Personal details
- Born: 28 November 1839
- Died: 15 March 1913 (aged 73)
- Denomination: Anglican
- Parents: William Legge, 4th Earl of Dartmouth & Frances Barrington
- Spouse: Fanny Stopford-Sackville
- Education: Christ Church, Oxford

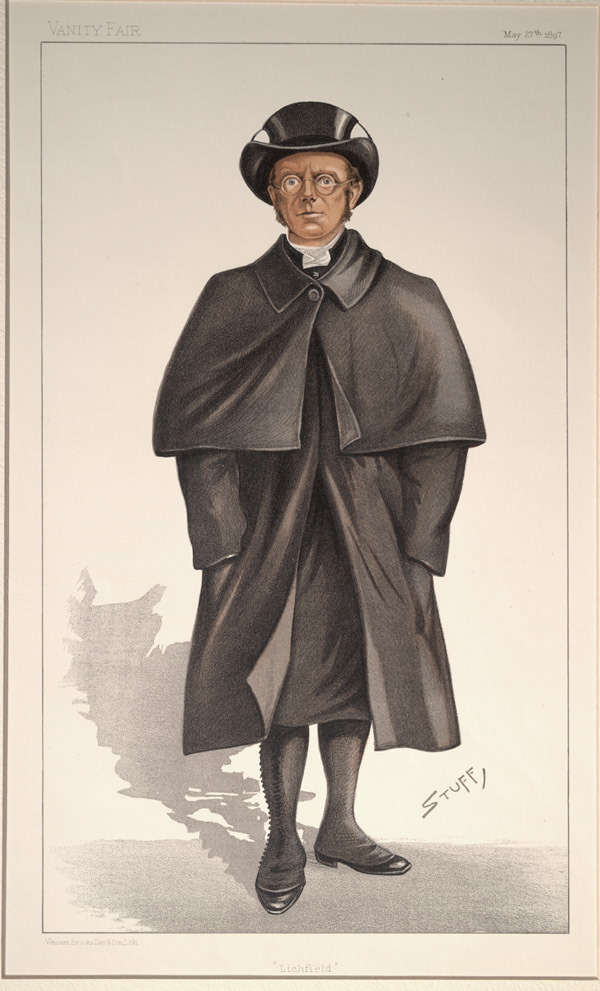
"Lichfield" Legge as caricatured in Vanity Fair, May 1897

Augustus Legge (28 November 1839 – 15 March 1913) was Bishop of Lichfield from 1891 until 1913.

== Family and education ==
Legge was the third son of William Legge, 4th Earl of Dartmouth, by his second wife Frances, daughter of George Barrington, 5th Viscount Barrington. William Legge, 5th Earl of Dartmouth, was his half-brother and Heneage Legge his full brother. He was educated at Eton and Christ Church, Oxford. He married Fanny Louisa, daughter of William Bruce Stopford Sackville, in 1877. They had several children. Fanny died in December 1911. Legge survived her by two years and died in March 1913, aged 73. He had requested burial at West Bromwich, near the Dartmouth family seat at Sandwell, should he die in retirement; but as he died in office as Bishop of Lichfield, he is buried there.

== Career ==
Ordained in 1864, he served curacies at Handsworth, Staffordshire (1864–1866) — where his family owned land — and afterwards at St Mary's, Bryanston Square (1866–1867). His brother (by then Earl of Dartmouth, and patron of the church) presented him to become Vicar of St Bartholomew's, Sydenham (1867–1879); he became additionally domestic chaplain to Anthony Thorold, Bishop of Rochester, and an honorary canon of Rochester Cathedral (1877–1891); he succeeded his uncle (Henry Legge) as Vicar of St Mary's, Lewisham (1879–1891) — where his brother was lord of the manor; and served additionally as Rural Dean of Greenwich (1880–1886); and of Lewisham (1886–1891) before his appointment to the episcopate: his election to the See of Lichfield was confirmed at St Mary-le-Bow on 28 September and he was consecrated a bishop at St Paul's Cathedral on 29 September 1891, by Edward Benson, Archbishop of Canterbury. From 1873 to 1876 he was a member of the London School Board, representing the Greenwich Division.

Church of England titles
Preceded by William Maclagan	Bishop of Lichfield; 1891–1913	Succeeded by John Kempthorne
