= Leonard White-Thomson =

Leonard Jauncey White-Thomson (15 November 1863 – 31 December 1933) was an Anglican bishop who served between 1924 and 1933.

He was born on 15 November 1863 and educated at Eton and King's College, Cambridge. Ordained in 1890, his first post was as Curate of St Margaret's, Nottingham, after which he was Domestic Chaplain to Archbishop Benson. Later he was Rector of St Martin's and St Paul's, Canterbury, Vicar of Ramsgate and from 1918 to 1924 he was Archdeacon of Canterbury before elevation to the episcopate as Bishop of Ely. He died on New Year's Eve, 1933 and was buried in Ely Cemetery.

He married (18 January 1897) the Hon. Margaret Adela Hepburn-Stuart-Forbes-Trefusis, daughter of Lord Clinton. She died 20 March 1939. Their son, Ian White-Thomson was Dean of Canterbury from 1963 until 1976.

The couple had two other sons and a daughter.

In 1928 Viscount Lascelles suggested that the Bishop was the author of a popular rhyme criticizing the fashion for short skirts that included the line "half an inch, half an inch, more than she oughter". The Bishop denied it, but admitted composing another rhyme criticizing the fashion.

Church of England titles
Preceded by William Walsh	Archdeacon of Canterbury; 1918 – 1924	Succeeded by Thomas Karl Sopwith
Preceded by Frederic Henry Chase	Bishop of Ely; 1924 – 1933	Succeeded by Bernard Heywood
