= Marmaduke Blakiston =

17th-century English Anglican priest

Marmaduke Blakiston was a 17th-century English Anglican priest.

Blakiston was born in York and educated at The Queen's College, Oxford. He held livings at Redmarshall and Sedgefield. He was Archdeacon of the East Riding from 1615 until his resignation in 1625. He was also a prebendary of York and Durham.
