= Henry Vodden =

Henry Townsend Vodden (10 July 1887 – 24 August 1960) was the fifth bishop of Hull in the modern era (from 1934 until 1957).

He was educated at Exeter School and Exeter College, Oxford, his first posts after ordination were as a missionary priest in India. He was later secretary of the CMS before elevation to the episcopate as a suffragan to the Archbishop of York. He died on 24 August 1960.

== Notes ==
Church of England titles
Preceded by Bernard Oliver Francis Heywood	Bishop of Hull; 1934 –1957	Succeeded by George Frederick Townley
