= Jane Williams (silversmith) =

Irish silversmith

- Born: Jane Terry; 2 December 1771; Cork
- Died: 17 April 1845 (aged 73)
- Occupation: Silversmith

Jane Williams (née Terry) (2 December 1771 - 17 April 1845) was an Irish silversmith.

== Early life ==
Jane Terry was born in Cork, in Munster, Ireland on 2 December 1771, the eldest daughter of Catherine (née Webb) and Carden Terry (1742-1821). She had six younger sisters and two younger brothers. Her father was a silversmith, as was her maternal grandfather Stonewell Webb. She married her father's apprentice John Williams on 6 August 1791 in St Peter's Church, Cork on 6 August 1791 and became known as Jane Williams. Her husband John Williams and her father Carden Terry went into partnership together in October 1791. John Williams died on 13 June 1806, and left Jane with five sons and two daughters.

== Career ==
Jane Williams registered a maker's mark of her own in Dublin in 1806, and entered into partnership with her father the following year, working at the family's business at 44 Grand Parade in Cork. Her father Carden Terry struck a new maker's mark in 1807, incorporating her initials (JW) beneath his own (TC).

Williams was the only female silversmith in Cork and created a range of silver, silver gilt and gold items, including cutlery, tableware and freedom boxes. She remained active in the profession until 1821, in which year her father died. Pieces produced by the two are well-regarded for their craftsmanship.

== Legacy ==
Two pieces by Williams and Terry are in the collection of the National Museum of Women in the Arts. They are a George II marrow scoop of c. 1810 and a Regency Irish Freedom Box of 1814.

Williams' work is highly collectible with items selling in major auction houses.
