= Frederick Blunt =

The Ven. Richard Frederick Lefevre Blunt (16 November 1833 – 23 January 1910) was the first Anglican Bishop of Hull since its abeyance in 1559; he served from 1891 until his death in 1910.

== Life ==
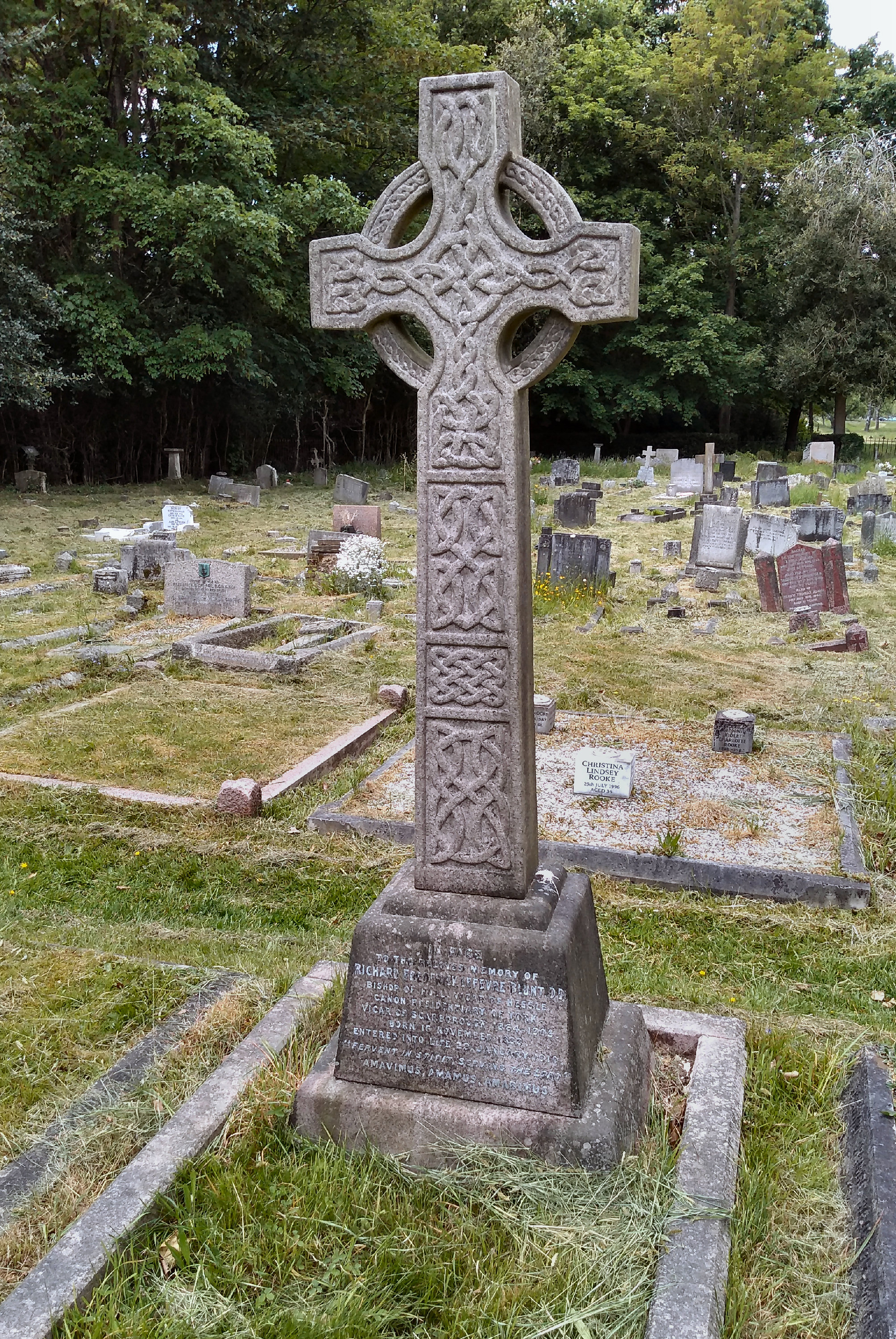
Grave at St Andrew's Church, Ham

Born in 1833 and educated at Merchant Taylors' and King's College London, his first post after Ordination was as a curate at St Paul, Cheltenham. He was the son of Samuel Jasper Blunt and the nephew of rector Henry Blunt.

After serving as vicar of Scarborough and Archdeacon of the East Riding (1873–1891) he was promoted in 1891 to the episcopate as a suffragan to the Archbishop of York.

He was vicar of All Saints, Hessle (near Hull) from 1905 to 1910. He died in 1910 and is buried at St Andrew's Church, Ham.

Bishop Frederick Blunt was grandfather of Anthony Blunt (1907–1983).

== Notes ==
Church of England titles
Vacant Title last held by Robert Sylvester	Bishop of Hull; 1891–1910	Succeeded by John Augustine Kempthorne
