= Frederic Chase =

British academic and Bishop of Ely

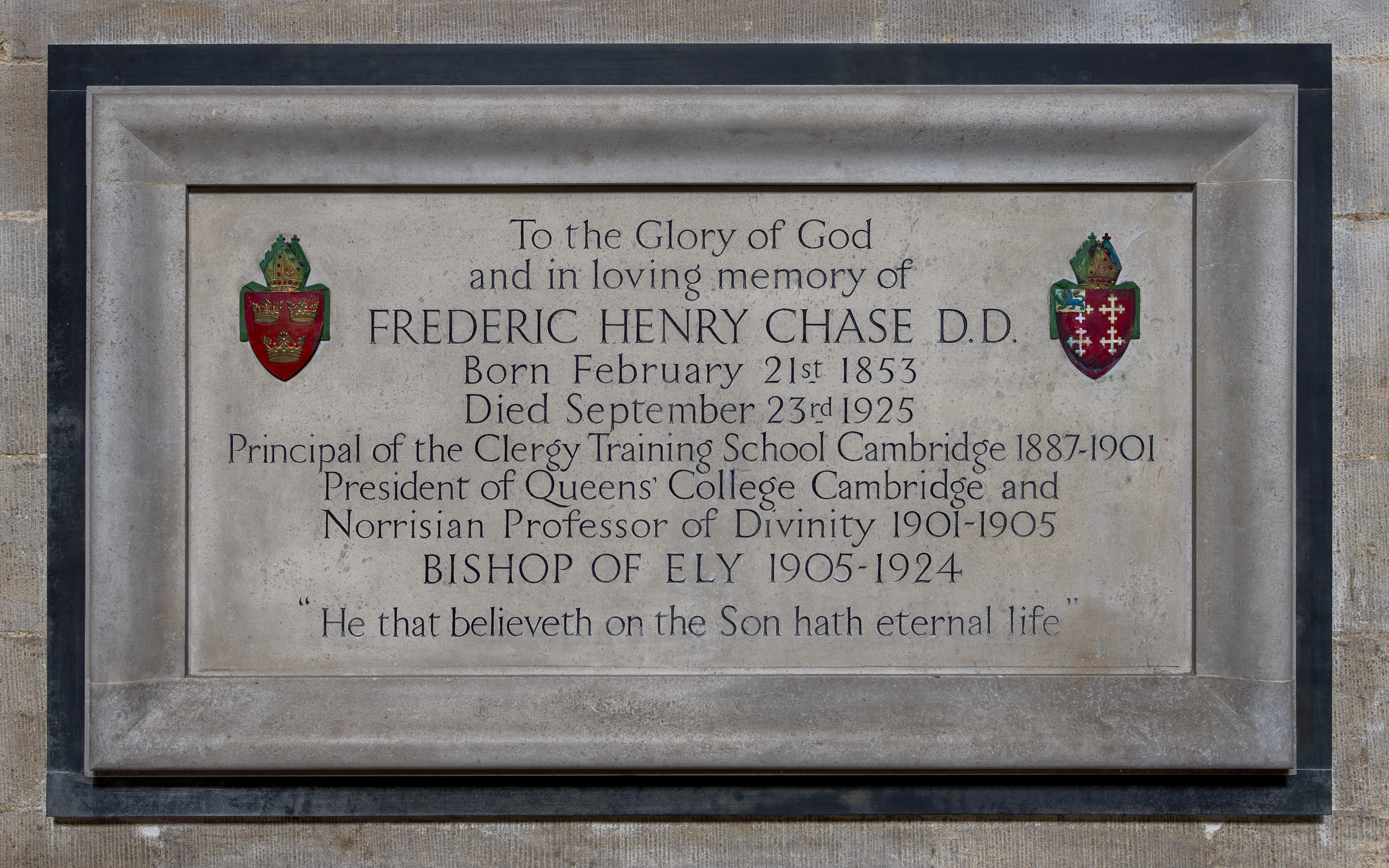
- Memorial to Chase in Ely Cathedral
- Born: 21 February 1853; Blackfriars, London
- Died: 23 September 1925 (aged 72); Normanhurst Hotel, Bexhill, Sussex
- Education: Christ's College, Cambridge
- Occupations: Academic and Bishop of Ely
- Spouse: Charlotte Elizabeth (m. 1877)

Frederic Henry Chase (21 February 1853, London – 23 September 1925, Bexhill) was a British academic and Bishop of Ely.

== Life ==
The only son of Charles Frederic Chase, rector of St Andrew by the Wardrobe and St Anne Blackfriars, and Susan Mary Alliston. Chase was educated at King's College School, London and Christ's College, Cambridge, graduating in classics in 1876 after receiving the Powys Medal the previous year.

He was ordained deacon in 1876 and priest in 1877, and briefly worked as curate of Sherborne before returning to Cambridge in 1879 He was a lecturer in divinity at Pembroke College, Cambridge from 1881 to 1890, and at Christ's College from 1893. In 1884 he became tutor of the Clergy Training School, Cambridge (now Westcott House), and in 1887 became principal of that college. He was elected to give the Hulsean Lectures for 1900. In late 1901 Chase was elected President of Queens' College, Cambridge and the following November he was also elected Norris Professor of Divinity.

Three years later, on 18 October 1905, he was consecrated a bishop by Randall Davidson, Archbishop of Canterbury, at Westminster Abbey; to serve as Bishop of Ely. He resigned as bishop in 1924 and died in 1925. He is buried in Brookwood Cemetery.

When the Great War opened in August, 1914, Chase declared his support for British involvement. He wrote ‘We believe the war to be a just and necessary war; but each day we feel more deeply its horrors and anxieties .... At this time of national need it seems to me that our young men ought to offer themselves for service in Lord Kitchener’s Second Army. I believe that this is a solemn duty. I earnestly hope that this diocese may not be behind in this matter. Here lies our national safety, under God.’ Under Chase's influence, clergy led local recruitment activities, and a survey of church schools indicated that they provided more recruits than council schools. This pressure from clergy backfired when they were accused of hypocrisy for encouraging recruitment but not having to face the enemy themselves. Chase wrote that clergy should not be blamed because they were ‘under orders’ from the bishop. Some clergy volunteered as temporary chaplains to the forces and others took on additional duties with prisoners of war and in the new and expanding military hospitals.

One of the bishop's sons, George Armitage Chase, was awarded a Military Cross when he was a temporary chaplain. He became Bishop of Ripon in 1946.

== Works ==
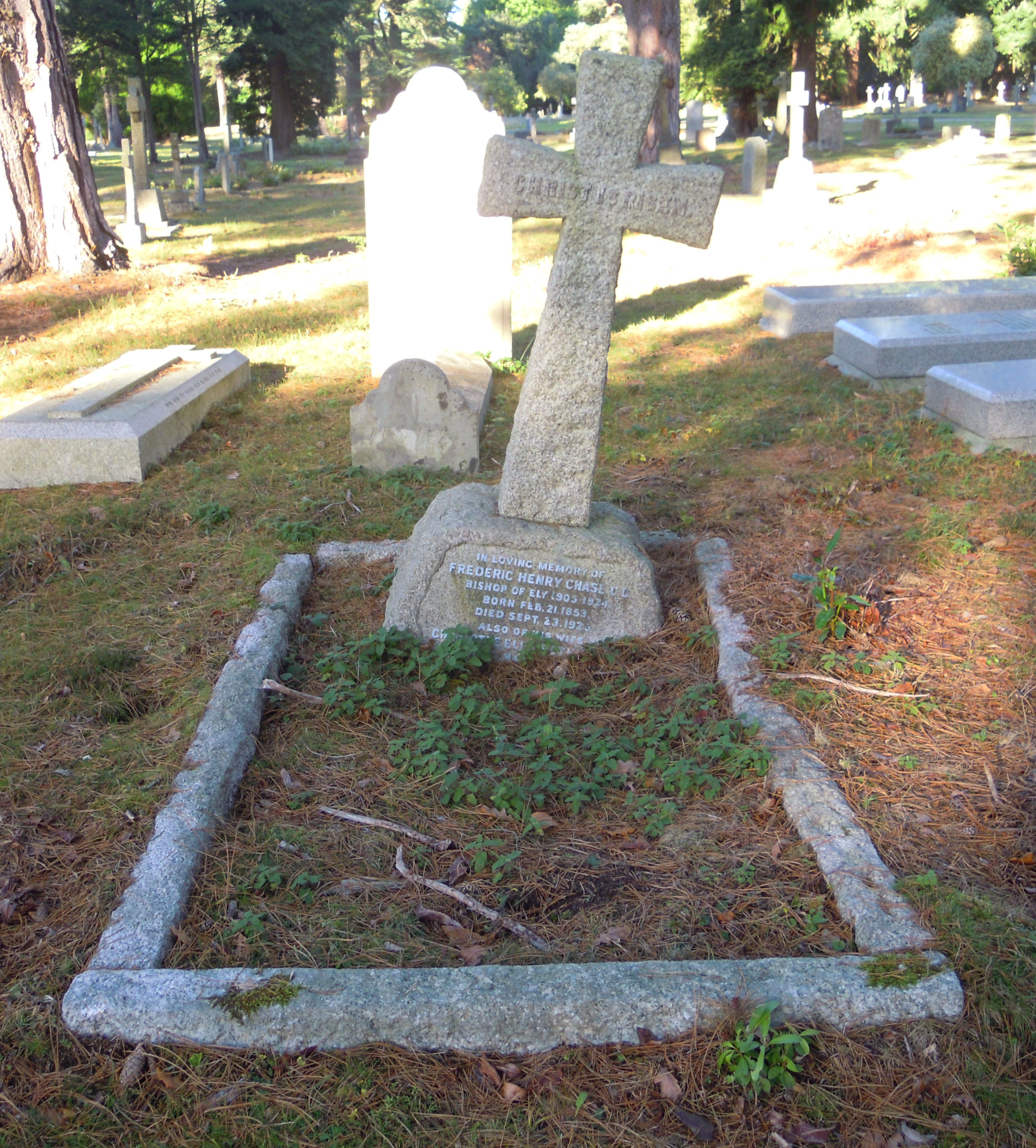
Grave of Frederic Chase in Brookwood Cemetery

Chase was known for research into the Bezan and Syro-Latin texts, including the Codex Bezae.

- Chrysostom (1887)
- The Lord´s Prayer in the Early Church (1891)
- F. H. Chase, The Old Syriac Element in the Text of Codex Bezae, MacMillan, 1893.

Academic offices
Preceded by Herbert Edward Ryle	President of Queens' College, Cambridge; 1901-1906	Succeeded by Thomas Cecil Fitzpatrick
Preceded by Adolphus William Ward	Vice-Chancellor of the University of Cambridge; 1902-1904	Succeeded by Edward Anthony Beck
Church of England titles
Preceded by Alwyne Compton	Bishop of Ely; 1905 – 1924	Succeeded by Leonard White-Thomson
