= David Butterfield =

Minister in the Church of England

David John Butterfield (born 1 January 1952) is an ordained Minister in the Church of England.

Butterfield was educated at Belle Vue Boys’ Grammar School; Royal Holloway College; and St John's College, Nottingham. He was ordained in 1977 before embarking on an ecclesiastical career. He was curate of Christ Church, Southport (1977–1981); Resident Minister of St Thomas' Church, Aldridge (1981-1991); Vicar of Lilleshall, Muxton and Sheriffhales (1991–2002) and of Lilleshall and Muxton (2002-2007).

He served as Archdeacon of the East Riding from 2007 to 2014. He was then appointed by the Archbishop of York to the post of Archdeacon for Generous Giving and Stewardship (and a Residentiary Canon of York Minster) from 2014 until his retirement on 1 July 2017. He now lives with his wife in Ripon, North Yorkshire.
