= Jane Williams (theologian) =

English Anglican theologian and writer (born 1957)

The Right Honourable The Lady Williams of Oystermouth
- Born: Hilary Jane Paul; 4 March 1957 (age 69); Trivandrum, Kerala, India
- Other names: Hilary Jane Williams; Jane Williams
- Spouse: Rowan Williams (m. 1981)
- Children: 2
- Parent: Geoffrey Paul

Academic background
- Education: Clare College, Cambridge

Academic work
- Discipline: Theology
- School or tradition: Anglicanism
- Institutions: St Mellitus College

Hilary Jane Williams, Baroness Williams of Oystermouth (née Paul; born 4 March 1957), is an English Anglican theologian and writer.

Williams was born on 4 March 1957 in Trivandrum, India, one of five sisters. Her father, Geoffrey Paul, former Bishop of Bradford, was then serving as a missionary priest at Palayamkottai and later Kerala. Her father was a member of the faculty and later became the principal of the Kerala United Theological Seminary at Kannammoola, where she spent part of her childhood. She studied theology at Clare College, Cambridge, and then worked in theological publishing and education. For three years she wrote a Sunday readings column for the Church Times (published by SPCK as Lectionary Reflections) and now works part-time for Redemptorist Publications, as a visiting lecturer at King's College London. She is assistant dean and lecturer at St Mellitus College (formerly St Paul's Theological Centre) in London.

Williams has been married since July 1981 to Rowan Williams, who was appointed as the 104th Archbishop of Canterbury in 2002. They have a daughter named Rhiannon (born 1988) and a son named Pip (born 1996). Following her husband's retirement as Archbishop of Canterbury and his subsequent peerage, Williams is entitled to the style and title of Lady Williams of Oystermouth.

== Bibliography ==
- Bread, Wine and Women: the ordination debate in the Church of England (with Sue Dowell), Virago, London, 1994. ISBN 1853817309
- Perfect Freedom (Borders), Canterbury Press, Norwich, 2001. ISBN 1853114375
- Lectionary Reflections: Year C, SPCK, London, 2003. ISBN 0281055297
- Lectionary Reflections: Year A, SPCK, London, 2004. ISBN 0281055270
- Lectionary Reflections: Year B, SPCK, London, 2005. ISBN 0281055289
- Approaching Christmas, Lion, Oxford, 2005. ISBN 0745951988
- Angels, Lion, Oxford, 2006. ISBN 0745952224
- Who Do You Say That I Am? Exploring Images of Jesus (Church Times Study Guides), Canterbury Press, Norwich, 2006. ISBN 1853116602
- The Fellowship of the Three: Exploring the Trinity (Church Times Study Guides), Canterbury Press, Norwich, 2006. ISBN 1853116998
- The Mighty Tortoise: Exploring the Church (Church Times Study Guides), Canterbury Press, Norwich, 2006. ISBN 1853117153
- Moving Mountains (Church Times Study Guides), Canterbury Press, Norwich, 2007. ISBN 1853117889
- Approaching Easter, Lion, Oxford, 2006. ISBN 0745951996
- A Christian Funeral: A Guide for the Family, Redemptorist Publications, Chawton, 2006. ISBN 0852313160
- Marriage, Mitres and Being Myself, SPCK, London, 2008. ISBN 0281060185
- Lost for Words? A Sermon Resource for the Anglican Three-Year Cycle, Redemptorist Publications, Chawton, 2009. ISBN 0852313691
- Lectionary Reflections: Years A, B & C, SPCK, London, 2011. ISBN 0281065799
- Faces of Christ: Jesus in Art, Lion, Oxford, 2011. ISBN 0745955223
- "Why Did Jesus Have to Die?"
