= List of United Kingdom locations: Ds-Dz =

The United Kingdom

This is part of the list of United Kingdom locations: a gazetteer of place names in the United Kingdom showing each place's locality and geographical coordinates.

== Du ==
=== Dua-Dum ===
Location	Locality	Coordinates (links to map & photo sources)	OS grid reference
Dubbs Cross	Devon	50.70°N 04.29°W	SX3892
Dubford	Aberdeenshire	57.65°N 02.35°W	NJ7963
Dubford	City of Aberdeen	57.19°N 02.11°W	NJ9312
Dubh Artach	Argyll and Bute	56.13°N 06.63°W	NM122029
Dubh Eilean	Argyll and Bute	56.01°N 06.27°W	NR337886
Dublin	Suffolk	52.27°N 01.16°E	TM1669
Dubwath	Cumbria	54.66°N 03.25°W	NY1931
Duck Corner	Suffolk	52.05°N 01.42°E	TM3545
Duck End (Stevington)	Bedfordshire	52.15°N 00.56°W	SP9852
Duck End (Wilstead)	Bedfordshire	52.08°N 00.45°W	TL0644
Duck End	Cambridgeshire	52.26°N 00.18°W	TL2464
Duck End	Buckinghamshire	51.93°N 00.85°W	SP7927
Duck End (Stebbing)	Essex	51.90°N 00.39°E	TL6526
Duck End (Finchingfield)	Essex	51.97°N 00.44°E	TL6833
Duck End (Birchanger)	Essex	51.87°N 00.19°E	TL5122
Duckend Green	Essex	51.87°N 00.49°E	TL7223
Duckhole	South Gloucestershire	51.62°N 02.52°W	ST6492
Duckington	Cheshire	53.05°N 02.77°W	SJ4851
Ducklington	Oxfordshire	51.76°N 01.49°W	SP3507
Duckmanton	Derbyshire	53.24°N 01.34°W	SK4472
Ducks Island	Barnet	51.64°N 00.22°W	TQ2395
Duckswich	Worcestershire	52.04°N 02.24°W	SO8339
Dudbridge	Gloucestershire	51.73°N 02.24°W	SO8304
Dudden Hill	Brent	51.55°N 00.24°W	TQ2285
Duddenhoe End	Essex	52.00°N 00.12°E	TL4636
Duddingston	City of Edinburgh	55.93°N 03.13°W	NT2972
Duddington	Northamptonshire	52.58°N 00.55°W	SK9800
Duddlestone	Somerset	50.98°N 03.09°W	ST2321
Duddleswell	East Sussex	51.02°N 00.08°E	TQ4627
Duddlewick	Shropshire	52.44°N 02.51°W	SO6583
Duddo	Northumberland	55.67°N 02.11°W	NT9342
Duddon	Cheshire	53.17°N 02.73°W	SJ5164
Duddon Bridge	Cumbria	54.28°N 03.24°W	SD1988
Duddon Common	Cheshire	53.18°N 02.71°W	SJ5265
Dudleston	Shropshire	52.93°N 02.98°W	SJ3438
Dudleston Grove	Shropshire	52.91°N 02.95°W	SJ3636
Dudleston Heath	Shropshire	52.91°N 02.95°W	SJ3636
Dudley	Borough of Dudley	52.50°N 02.10°W	SO9390
Dudley	North Tyneside	55.05°N 01.59°W	NZ2673
Dudley Hill	Bradford	53.77°N 01.72°W	SE1831
Dudley Port	Sandwell	52.51°N 02.06°W	SO9691
Dudley's Fields	Walsall	52.60°N 02.03°W	SJ9801
Dudley Wood	Sandwell	52.47°N 02.08°W	SO9486
Dudlow's Green	Cheshire	53.35°N 02.57°W	SJ6284
Dudsbury	Dorset	50.78°N 01.90°W	SZ0798
Dudswell	Hertfordshire	51.77°N 00.60°W	SP9609
Dudwells	Pembrokeshire	51.84°N 05.05°W	SM9021
Duerdon	Devon	50.94°N 04.39°W	SS3219
Duffield	Derbyshire	52.98°N 01.49°W	SK3443
Duffieldbank	Derbyshire	52.98°N 01.48°W	SK3543
Duffryn	Shropshire	52.43°N 03.14°W	SO2282
Duffryn	Neath Port Talbot	51.64°N 03.69°W	SS8395
Duffryn	City of Newport	51.55°N 03.02°W	ST2985
Duff's Hill	Aberdeenshire	57.08°N 02.15°W	NO9199
Dufftown	Moray	57.43°N 03.13°W	NJ3239
Duffus	Moray	57.69°N 03.41°W	NJ1668
Dufton	Cumbria	54.61°N 02.49°W	NY6825
Duggleby	North Yorkshire	54.09°N 00.67°W	SE8767
Duich	Argyll and Bute	55.69°N 06.15°W	NR388522
Duirinish	Highland	57.31°N 05.68°W	NG7831
Duisdalemore	Highland	57.15°N 05.80°W	NG7013
Duisky	Highland	56.83°N 05.28°W	NN0076
Duke End	Warwickshire	52.48°N 01.69°W	SP2188
Dukesfield	Northumberland	54.90°N 02.09°W	NY9457
Dukestown	Blaenau Gwent	51.78°N 03.26°W	SO1310
Dukinfield	Tameside	53.47°N 02.09°W	SJ9497
Dulas	Isle of Anglesey	53.37°N 04.30°W	SH4789
Dulcote	Somerset	51.19°N 02.63°W	ST5644
Dulford	Devon	50.84°N 03.33°W	ST0606
Dull	Perth and Kinross	56.61°N 03.95°W	NN8049
Dullatur	North Lanarkshire	55.96°N 04.02°W	NS7476
Dullingham	Cambridgeshire	52.18°N 00.36°E	TL6257
Dullingham Ley	Cambridgeshire	52.17°N 00.39°E	TL6456
Dulnain Bridge	Highland	57.29°N 03.67°W	NH9924
Duloch	Fife	56.05°N 03.39°W	NT1385
Duloe	Cornwall	50.39°N 04.49°W	SX2358
Duloe	Bedfordshire	52.22°N 00.31°W	TL1560
Dulverton	Somerset	51.04°N 03.55°W	SS9128
Dulwich	Southwark	51.43°N 00.07°W	TQ3472
Dulwich Village	Southwark	51.44°N 00.08°W	TQ3373
Dumbarton	West Dunbartonshire	55.94°N 04.56°W	NS4075
Dumbleton	Gloucestershire	52.02°N 01.98°W	SP0136
Dumbreck	City of Glasgow	55.83°N 04.30°W	NS5663
Dumcrieff	Dumfries and Galloway	55.31°N 03.41°W	NT1003
Dumfries	Dumfries and Galloway	55.06°N 03.61°W	NX9776
Dumgoyne	Stirling	56.01°N 04.37°W	NS5283
Dummer	Hampshire	51.20°N 01.17°W	SU5845
Dumpford	West Sussex	50.98°N 00.83°W	SU8221
Dumpinghill	Devon	50.85°N 04.21°W	SS4408
Dumpling Green	Norfolk	52.66°N 00.95°E	TG0012
Dumplington	Trafford	53.46°N 02.36°W	SJ7697
Dumpton	Kent	51.34°N 01.41°E	TR3866

=== Dun ===
Location	Locality	Coordinates (links to map & photo sources)	OS grid reference
Dun	Western Isles	57.79°N 08.56°W	NF104974
Dun	Angus	56.72°N 02.55°W	NO6659
Dunalastair	Perth and Kinross	56.69°N 04.10°W	NN7158
Dunamuck	Argyll and Bute	56.07°N 05.47°W	NR8492
Dunan	Highland	57.27°N 06.01°W	NG5827
Dunandhu	Aberdeenshire	57.16°N 03.29°W	NJ2209
Dunans	Argyll and Bute	56.05°N 05.53°W	NR8090
Dunball	Somerset	51.16°N 02.98°W	ST3141
Dunbar	East Lothian	55.99°N 02.53°W	NT6778
Dunbeath	Highland	58.24°N 03.43°W	ND1629
Dunbeg	Argyll and Bute	56.44°N 05.45°W	NM8733
Dunblane	Stirling	56.18°N 03.96°W	NN7801
Dunbog	Fife	56.34°N 03.16°W	NO2817
Dun Boreraig	Highland	57.48°N 06.69°W	NG1953
Dunbridge	Hampshire	51.03°N 01.55°W	SU3126
Duncansby Head	Highland	58.64°N 03.03°W	ND398732
Duncansclett	Shetland Islands	60.05°N 01.35°W	HU3630
Duncanston	Highland	57.57°N 04.37°W	NH5856
Duncanstone	Aberdeenshire	57.32°N 02.71°W	NJ5726
Dunchideock	Devon	50.67°N 03.60°W	SX8787
Dunchurch	Warwickshire	52.33°N 01.29°W	SP4871
Dun Colbost	Highland	57.44°N 06.66°W	NG2049
Duncombe	Lancashire	53.84°N 02.76°W	SD5039
Duncote	Northamptonshire	52.14°N 01.02°W	SP6750
Duncow	Dumfries and Galloway	55.13°N 03.63°W	NX9683
Duncrievie	Perth and Kinross	56.26°N 03.40°W	NO1309
Duncton	West Sussex	50.94°N 00.64°W	SU9517
Dundee	City of Dundee	56.47°N 03.04°W	NO3632
Dundeugh	Dumfries and Galloway	55.15°N 04.21°W	NX5987
Dundon	Somerset	51.08°N 02.75°W	ST4732
Dundonald	South Ayrshire	55.57°N 04.60°W	NS3634
Dundonald	Fife	56.13°N 03.27°W	NT2194
Dundon Hayes	Somerset	51.08°N 02.77°W	ST4632
Dundonnell	Highland	57.83°N 05.21°W	NH0987
Dundraw	Cumbria	54.83°N 03.23°W	NY2149
Dundrennan	Dumfries and Galloway	54.80°N 03.96°W	NX7447
Dundridge	Hampshire	50.95°N 01.18°W	SU5718
Dundry	North Somerset	51.39°N 02.64°W	ST5566
Dunduff	Perth and Kinross	56.27°N 03.90°W	NN8211
Dundyvan	North Lanarkshire	55.85°N 04.04°W	NS7264
Dunecht	Aberdeenshire	57.17°N 02.41°W	NJ7509
Dunfermline	Fife	56.06°N 03.44°W	NT1087
Dunfield	Gloucestershire	51.67°N 01.79°W	SU1497
Dunford Bridge	Barnsley	53.51°N 01.77°W	SE1502
Dun Gainmhich	Western Isles	57.47°N 07.35°W	NF7955
Dungate	Kent	51.29°N 00.73°E	TQ9159
Dunge	Wiltshire	51.28°N 02.15°W	ST8954
Dungeness	Kent	50.91°N 00.97°E	TR089172
Dungworth	Sheffield	53.39°N 01.58°W	SK2889
Dunham-on-the-Hill	Cheshire	53.24°N 02.79°W	SJ4772
Dunham on Trent	Nottinghamshire	53.25°N 00.78°W	SK8174
Dunhampstead	Worcestershire	52.23°N 02.13°W	SO9160
Dunhampton	Worcestershire	52.29°N 02.23°W	SO8466
Dunham Town	Trafford	53.37°N 02.39°W	SJ7487
Dunham Woodhouses	Trafford	53.38°N 02.42°W	SJ7288
Dunholme	Lincolnshire	53.29°N 00.47°W	TF0279
Dunino	Fife	56.28°N 02.76°W	NO5311
Dunipace	Falkirk	56.02°N 03.92°W	NS8083
Dunira	Perth and Kinross	56.38°N 04.05°W	NN7323
Dunkeld	Perth and Kinross	56.56°N 03.59°W	NO0242
Dunkenny	Angus	56.61°N 03.06°W	NO3547
Dunkerton	Bath and North East Somerset	51.32°N 02.41°W	ST7159
Dunkeswell	Devon	50.85°N 03.22°W	ST1407
Dunkeswick	Leeds	53.90°N 01.54°W	SE3046
Dunkirk	Cambridgeshire	52.45°N 00.22°E	TL5186
Dunkirk	South Gloucestershire	51.57°N 02.31°W	ST7886
Dunkirk	Wiltshire	51.34°N 02.01°W	ST9961
Dunkirk	Kent	51.29°N 00.96°E	TR0759
Dunkirk	Staffordshire	53.06°N 02.28°W	SJ8152
Dunkirk	Nottinghamshire	52.93°N 01.18°W	SK5538
Dunkirk	Cheshire	53.24°N 02.93°W	SJ3872
Dunkirk	Norfolk	52.79°N 01.26°E	TG2027
Dunk's Green	Kent	51.24°N 00.30°E	TQ6152
Dunley	Hampshire	51.27°N 01.35°W	SU4553
Dunley	Worcestershire	52.31°N 02.32°W	SO7869
Dunlop	East Ayrshire	55.70°N 04.54°W	NS4049
Dunmere	Cornwall	50.47°N 04.76°W	SX0467
Dunmore	Highland	57.48°N 04.48°W	NH5147
Dunmore	Falkirk	56.08°N 03.78°W	NS8989
Dunnerholme	Cumbria	54.20°N 03.21°W	SD2179
Dunnet	Highland	58.62°N 03.34°W	ND2271
Dunnet Head	Highland	58.66°N 03.39°W	ND194761
Dunnichen	Angus	56.62°N 02.81°W	NO5048
Dunnikier	Fife	56.13°N 03.19°W	NT2694
Dunning	Perth and Kinross	56.30°N 03.58°W	NO0214
Dunnington	Warwickshire	52.17°N 01.91°W	SP0653
Dunnington	York	53.96°N 00.99°W	SE6652
Dunnington	East Riding of Yorkshire	53.95°N 00.24°W	TA1552
Dunningwell	Cumbria	54.24°N 03.27°W	SD1784
Dunnockshaw	Lancashire	53.73°N 02.28°W	SD8127
Dunnose	Isle of Wight	50.59°N 01.18°W	SZ581781
Dunnsheath	Shropshire	52.74°N 02.78°W	SJ4717
Dunn Street (Ashford)	Kent	51.19°N 00.84°E	TQ9948
Dunn Street (Maidstone)	Kent	51.32°N 00.56°E	TQ7961
Dunollie	Argyll and Bute	56.42°N 05.48°W	NM8531
Dunoon	Argyll and Bute	55.94°N 04.93°W	NS1776
Dunragit	Dumfries and Galloway	54.87°N 04.88°W	NX1557
Dunrostan	Argyll and Bute	55.96°N 05.63°W	NR7381
Duns	Scottish Borders	55.77°N 02.35°W	NT7853
Dunsa	Derbyshire	53.22°N 01.64°W	SK2470
Dunsby	Lincolnshire	52.82°N 00.36°W	TF1026
Dunscar	Bolton	53.62°N 02.43°W	SD7114
Dunscore	Dumfries and Galloway	55.13°N 03.79°W	NX8684
Dunscroft	Doncaster	53.56°N 01.01°W	SE6508
Dunsdale	Redcar and Cleveland	54.55°N 01.07°W	NZ6018
Dunsden Green	Oxfordshire	51.48°N 00.94°W	SU7377
Dunsfold Common	Surrey	51.10°N 00.57°W	TQ0035
Dunsfold Green	Surrey	51.11°N 00.57°W	TQ0036
Dunsfold	Surrey	51.11°N 00.57°W	TQ0036
Dunsford	Devon	50.68°N 03.68°W	SX8189
Dunshalt	Fife	56.27°N 03.21°W	NO2510
Dunsill	Nottinghamshire	53.14°N 01.31°W	SK4661
Dunslea or Dunsley	Cornwall	50.51°N 04.44°W	SX2771
Dunsley	Staffordshire	52.44°N 02.22°W	SO8583
Dunsley	North Yorkshire	54.48°N 00.68°W	NZ8511
Dunsmore	Warwickshire	52.37°N 01.20°W	SP5476
Dunsmore	Buckinghamshire	51.73°N 00.75°W	SP8605
Dunsop Bridge	Lancashire	53.94°N 02.53°W	SD6550
Dunstable	Bedfordshire	51.87°N 00.53°W	TL0121
Dunstal	Staffordshire	52.83°N 01.89°W	SK0726
Dunstall	Staffordshire	52.77°N 01.73°W	SK1820
Dunstall Common	Worcestershire	52.08°N 02.17°W	SO8843
Dunstall Green	Suffolk	52.21°N 00.54°E	TL7460
Dunstall Hill	Wolverhampton	52.59°N 02.14°W	SJ9000
Dunstan	Northumberland	55.46°N 01.62°W	NU2419
Dunster	Somerset	51.17°N 03.44°W	SS9943
Duns Tew	Oxfordshire	51.94°N 01.34°W	SP4528
Dunston	Gateshead	54.95°N 01.65°W	NZ2262
Dunston	Derbyshire	53.25°N 01.46°W	SK3673
Dunston	Lincolnshire	53.14°N 00.41°W	TF0662
Dunston	Staffordshire	52.75°N 02.11°W	SJ9217
Dunston	Norfolk	52.57°N 01.27°E	TG2202
Dunstone (Yealmpton)	Devon	50.34°N 03.98°W	SX5951
Dunstone (Widecombe)	Devon	50.56°N 03.82°W	SX7175
Dunstone (Stokenham)	Devon	50.24°N 03.69°W	SX7940
Dunston Heath	Staffordshire	52.75°N 02.13°W	SJ9117
Dunston Hill	Gateshead	54.94°N 01.65°W	NZ2261
Dunsville	Doncaster	53.55°N 01.03°W	SE6407
Dunswell	East Riding of Yorkshire	53.80°N 00.37°W	TA0735
Dunsyre	South Lanarkshire	55.71°N 03.48°W	NT0748
Dunterton	Devon	50.58°N 04.30°W	SX3779
Dunthrop	Oxfordshire	51.94°N 01.49°W	SP3528
Duntisbourne Abbots	Gloucestershire	51.76°N 02.04°W	SO9707
Duntisbourne Leer	Gloucestershire	51.76°N 02.04°W	SO9707
Duntisbourne Rouse	Gloucestershire	51.75°N 02.03°W	SO9806
Duntish	Dorset	50.85°N 02.44°W	ST6906
Duntocher	West Dunbartonshire	55.92°N 04.43°W	NS4873
Dunton	Bedfordshire	52.08°N 00.20°W	TL2344
Dunton	Buckinghamshire	51.90°N 00.80°W	SP8224
Dunton	Norfolk	52.83°N 00.77°E	TF8730
Dunton Bassett	Leicestershire	52.50°N 01.20°W	SP5490
Dunton Green	Kent	51.29°N 00.16°E	TQ5157
Dunton Patch	Norfolk	52.83°N 00.77°E	TF8730
Duntulm	Highland	57.68°N 06.34°W	NG4174
Dunure	South Ayrshire	55.39°N 04.76°W	NS2515
Dunvant	Swansea	51.61°N 04.03°W	SS5993
Dunvegan	Highland	57.43°N 06.58°W	NG2547
Dunveth	Cornwall	50.51°N 04.85°W	SW9872
Dunwear	Somerset	51.11°N 02.98°W	ST3135
Dunwich	Suffolk	52.27°N 01.61°E	TM4770
Dunwood	Staffordshire	53.09°N 02.07°W	SJ9555

=== Dur-Dux ===
Location	Locality	Coordinates (links to map & photo sources)	OS grid reference
Durdar	Cumbria	54.84°N 02.93°W	NY4050
Durgan	Cornwall	50.10°N 05.12°W	SW7727
Durgates	East Sussex	51.06°N 00.31°E	TQ6232
Durham	County Durham	54.77°N 01.58°W	NZ2742
Durisdeer	Dumfries and Galloway	55.30°N 03.75°W	NS8903
Durisdeermill	Dumfries and Galloway	55.31°N 03.76°W	NS8804
Durkar	Wakefield	53.64°N 01.53°W	SE3117
Durleigh	Somerset	51.11°N 03.04°W	ST2736
Durleighmarsh	West Sussex	51.00°N 00.88°W	SU7823
Durley	Hampshire	50.94°N 01.27°W	SU5116
Durley	Wiltshire	51.37°N 01.67°W	SU2364
Durley Street	Hampshire	50.95°N 01.26°W	SU5217
Durlock	Kent	51.26°N 01.25°E	TR2757
Durlow Common	Herefordshire	52.04°N 02.54°W	SO6339
Durlston Head	Dorset	50.59°N 01.96°W	SZ028771
Durn	Rochdale	53.64°N 02.09°W	SD9416
Durnamuck	Highland	57.87°N 05.35°W	NH0192
Durness	Highland	58.56°N 04.75°W	NC4067
Durnfield	Somerset	50.97°N 02.72°W	ST4920
Durno	Aberdeenshire	57.34°N 02.48°W	NJ7128
Durns Town	Hampshire	50.78°N 01.60°W	SZ2898
Duror	Highland	56.63°N 05.29°W	NM9854
Durrant Green	Kent	51.09°N 00.68°E	TQ8836
Durrants	Hampshire	50.87°N 00.97°W	SU7209
Durrington	Wiltshire	51.19°N 01.78°W	SU1544
Durrington	West Sussex	50.82°N 00.42°W	TQ1104
Durrington-on-Sea Sta	West Sussex	50.81°N 00.41°W	TQ1203
Durrisdale	Orkney Islands	59.09°N 03.10°W	HY3724
Durris Ho	Aberdeenshire	57.05°N 02.34°W	NO7996
Dursley	Gloucestershire	51.68°N 02.34°W	ST7698
Dursley	Wiltshire	51.28°N 02.20°W	ST8654
Dursley Cross	Gloucestershire	51.87°N 02.45°W	SO6920
Durston	Somerset	51.04°N 03.01°W	ST2928
Durweston	Dorset	50.87°N 02.21°W	ST8508
Dury	Shetland Islands	60.32°N 01.18°W	HU4560
Duryard	Devon	50.73°N 03.54°W	SX9194
Duston	Northamptonshire	52.23°N 00.94°W	SP7260
Dutchmans Cap	Argyll and Bute	56.45°N 06.47°W	NM244385
Dutch Village	Essex	51.51°N 00.54°E	TQ7783
Duthil	Highland	57.29°N 03.77°W	NH9324
Dutlas	Powys	52.38°N 03.16°W	SO2177
Duton Hill	Essex	51.90°N 00.32°E	TL6026
Dutson	Cornwall	50.64°N 04.34°W	SX3485
Dutton	Cheshire	53.30°N 02.64°W	SJ5779
Duxford	Cambridgeshire	52.08°N 00.14°E	TL4745
Duxford	Oxfordshire	51.68°N 01.48°W	SU3699
Duxmoor	Herefordshire	52.38°N 02.82°W	SO4477

== Dw-Dz ==
Location	Locality	Coordinates (links to map & photo sources)	OS grid reference
Dwygyfylchi	Conwy	53.27°N 03.90°W	SH7377
Dwyran	Isle of Anglesey	53.16°N 04.33°W	SH4466
Dwyrhiw	Powys	52.60°N 03.37°W	SJ0702
Dyce	City of Aberdeen	57.19°N 02.20°W	NJ8812
Dyche	Somerset	51.16°N 03.20°W	ST1641
Dye House	Northumberland	54.91°N 02.11°W	NY9358
Dyer's Common	South Gloucestershire	51.54°N 02.65°W	ST5583
Dyer's Green	Cambridgeshire	52.08°N 00.03°W	TL3545
Dyffryn	Ceredigion	52.12°N 04.54°W	SN2650
Dyffryn	Pembrokeshire	51.99°N 05.00°W	SM9437
Dyffryn	Carmarthenshire	51.87°N 04.45°W	SN3122
Dyffryn	Bridgend	51.62°N 03.66°W	SS8593
Dyffryn	The Vale Of Glamorgan	51.43°N 03.31°W	ST0971
Dyffryn	Isle of Anglesey	53.28°N 04.56°W	SH2979
Dyffryn Ardudwy	Gwynedd	52.78°N 04.10°W	SH5823
Dyffryn-bern	Ceredigion	52.13°N 04.51°W	SN2851
Dyffryn Cellwen	Neath Port Talbot	51.77°N 03.66°W	SN8510
Dyke	Moray	57.60°N 03.70°W	NH9858
Dyke	Lincolnshire	52.78°N 00.37°W	TF1022
Dykehead	Stirling	56.14°N 04.27°W	NS5997
Dykehead	Angus	56.72°N 03.01°W	NO3860
Dykehead	North Lanarkshire	55.81°N 03.80°W	NS8759
Dykeside	Aberdeenshire	57.47°N 02.46°W	NJ7243
Dylife	Powys	52.53°N 03.68°W	SN8694
Dymchurch	Kent	51.02°N 00.99°E	TR1029
Dymock	Gloucestershire	51.97°N 02.45°W	SO6931
Dyrham	South Gloucestershire	51.47°N 02.39°W	ST7375
Dysart	Fife	56.12°N 03.12°W	NT3093
Dyserth	Denbighshire	53.29°N 03.42°W	SJ0579
