= 1st North Riding Artillery Volunteers =

1st North Riding Artillery Volunteers 1st North Riding Royal Garrison Artillery (V) Northumbrian (North Riding) Heavy Battery
- Active: 1860–1919
- Country: United Kingdom
- Branch: Territorial Force
- Role: Heavy Artillery
- Garrison/HQ: Guisborough (1860–81); Middlesbrough (1881–1919)
- Engagements: Western Front (World War I)

Commanders
- Notable commanders: Admiral Thomas Chaloner, RN, of Gisborough Hall; Lawrence Dundas, 1st Marquess of Zetland

The 1st North Riding Artillery Volunteers was a part-time unit formed in the North Riding of Yorkshire in 1860 in response to an invasion scare. The unit later became part of the Territorial Force and served on the Western Front during World War I, while their successors served as anti-aircraft gunners in World War II.

== Origin ==
The enthusiasm for the Volunteer movement following an invasion scare in 1859 saw the creation of many Rifle, Artillery and Engineer Volunteer units composed of part-time soldiers eager to supplement the Regular British Army in time of need. One such unit was the 1st Yorkshire (North Riding) Artillery Volunteer Corps (AVC) formed at Guisborough on 27 January 1860. It was soon followed by the 2nd Yorkshire (North Riding) AVC at Whitby on 27 March 1860 and a 3rd Corps formed at Middlesbrough in February 1860. However, the 3rd Corps was never properly established and was replaced by the 3rd Yorkshire (North Riding) AVC at Scarborough on 20 May 1860.

== Volunteer Force ==
The 1st North Riding AVC at Guisborough was very successful and soon reached a strength of eight companies under the command of Captain (later Admiral) Thomas Chaloner, RN, of Gisborough Hall, with the rank of Lieutenant-Colonel Commandant. The 2nd and 3rd North Yorkshire AVCs were attached to the 1st Administrative Battalion of Yorkshire (East Riding) AVCs, which actually had its headquarters (HQ) at Scarborough in the North Riding.

In 1881, the 1st North Riding AVC moved its HQ to a new drill hall at Grange Road in the growing industrial town of Middlesbrough (No 4 Battery apparently remained at Northgate in Fountain Street, Guisborough), and in 1882 it became part of the Northern Division of the Royal Artillery, transferring to the Western Division in 1889. In 1891, it was converted to the role of 'position artillery', manning semi-mobile guns to operate with the Volunteer Infantry Brigades.

Admiral Chaloner was succeeded as Lt-Col in 1881 by the 3rd Earl (and future 1st Marquess) of Zetland, a former Regular Army lieutenant in the Royal Horse Guards and Yeomanry captain in the Yorkshire Hussars. (Zetland's father, the 2nd Earl, had drilled all household members at his estates in North Yorkshire every day during the Volunteer craze of 1859–60.) Admiral Chaloner became Honorary Colonel of the unit and died in 1884.

All Volunteer Artillery units became part of the Royal Garrison Artillery (RGA) in 1899 and in 1902 the unit was redesignated 1st North Riding Royal Garrison Artillery (Volunteers).

After the Second Boer War broke out, the infantry volunteers and Yeomanry cavalry were invited to send service companies of volunteers to supplement the regular infantry battalions and to form the Mounted infantry of the Imperial Yeomanry (IY). There was no equivalent outlet for volunteer gunners to serve in South Africa. However, when a second IY contingent was raised in 1901, one of its companies was chosen from volunteer gunners mainly from Middlesbrough. The 98th (North Riding of Yorkshire Volunteer Artillery) Company, Imperial Yeomanry, was commanded by an unattached captain, R.L. Grigg, while Capt W.N. Coates of the 1st North Riding AVC was commissioned as its lieutenant. It was sent out to South Africa assigned to reinforce the 3rd Battalion, IY, composed of Yorkshire and Nottinghamshire companies that had been serving there for a year. However, after the men's departure, the company disappeared from official view, and the UK press ran stories about the 'missing' 300 men (the number of volunteers who had reportedly come forward from North Yorkshire; the actual establishment of an IY company was 121 all ranks). More prosaically, it appears that the fate of the 98th Company was similar to that of many Second Contingent IY units: on board ship, they had been attached to the 47th (Duke of Cambridge's Own) Company (an Irish unit) then, on arrival in South Africa, the men had simply been drafted to existing units, mostly to 63rd (Wiltshire), 66th (Yorkshire) and 75th (Sharpshooters) Companies, only the 66th being in 3rd Bn.

== Territorial Force ==
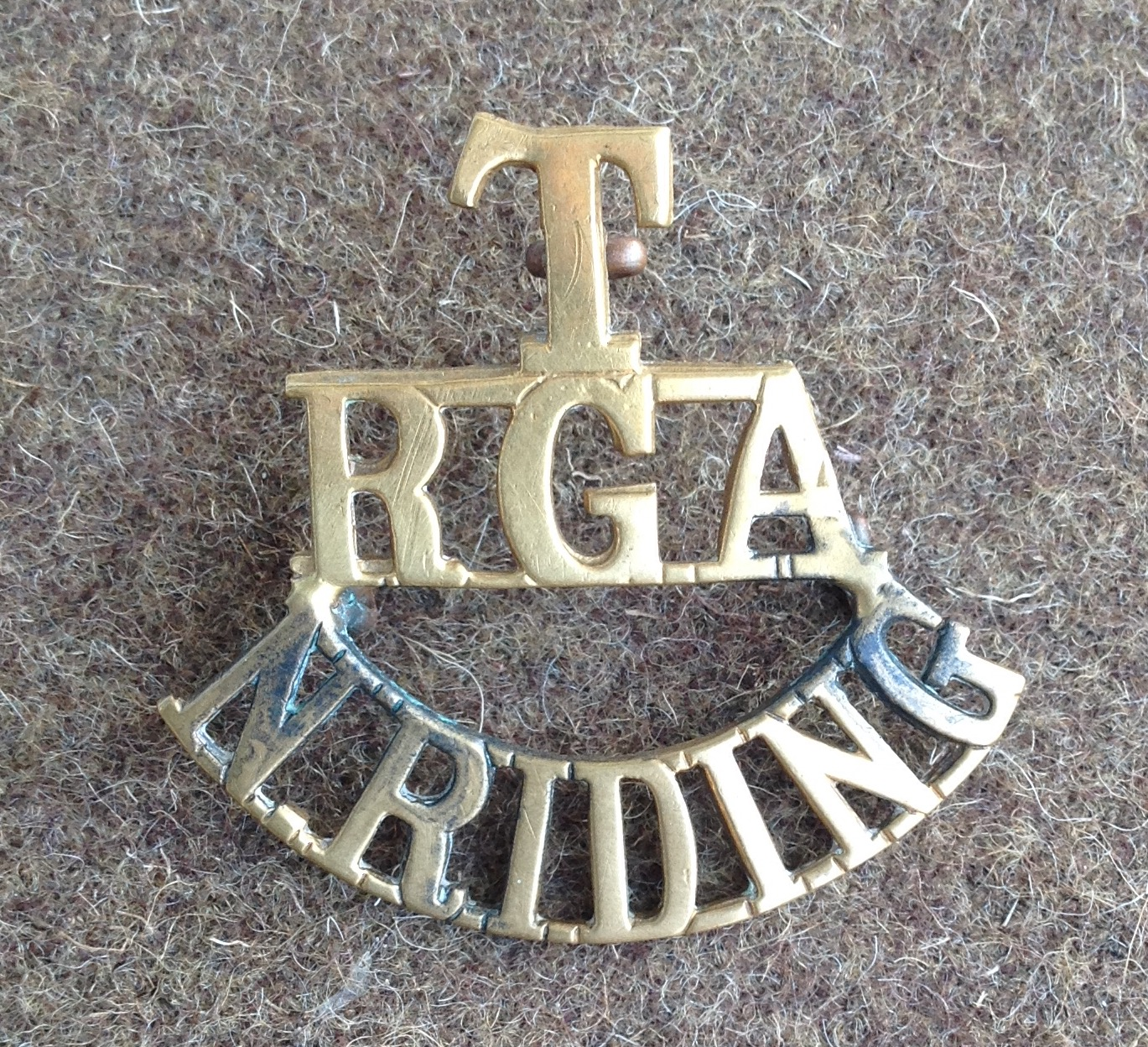
Brass shoulder title of the North Riding RGA, worn from 1908

When the Volunteers were subsumed into the new Territorial Force (TF) under the Haldane Reforms of 1908, the corps became the Northumbrian (North Riding) Heavy Battery, RGA, equipped with four 4.7-inch guns, and its attached Northumbrian (North Riding) Ammunition Column, RGA. It formed part of the Northumbrian Division of the TF.

== World War I ==
=== Mobilisation ===
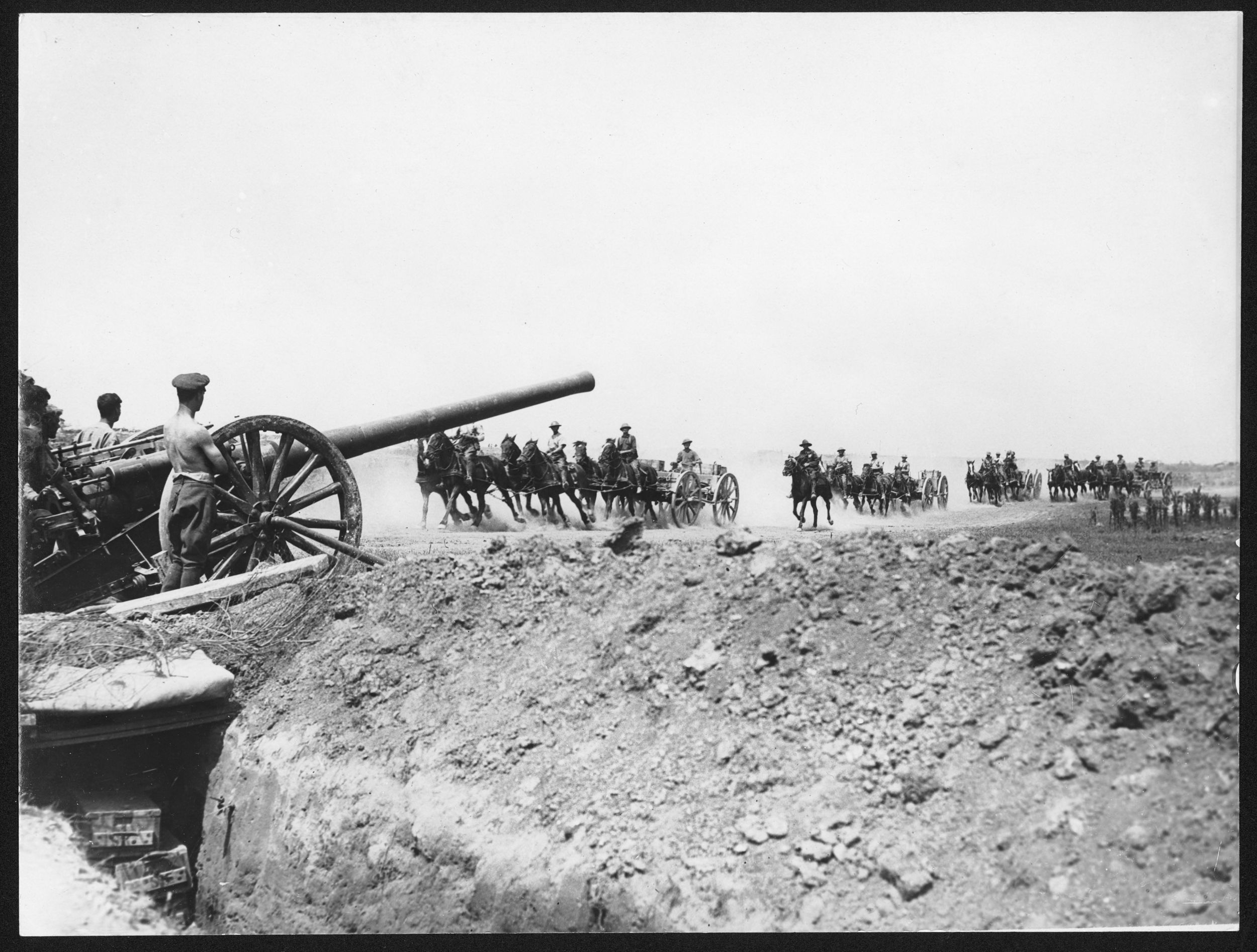
4.7-inch gun and ammunition limbers

On the outbreak of war, on 4 August 1914, the Northumbrian RGA mobilised at Middlesbrough under the command of Major C.T. Hennah and moved to Monkseaton on 8 August, then to Newcastle upon Tyne on 1 September as part of the Tyne defences. After mobilisation, units of the TF were invited to volunteer for Overseas Service, and on 15 August the War Office issued instructions to separate those men who had signed up for Home Service only, and form these into reserve units. On 31 August, the formation of a reserve or 2nd Line unit was authorised for each 1st Line unit where 60 per cent or more of the men had volunteered for Overseas Service. The titles of these 2nd Line units would be the same as the original, but distinguished by a '2/' prefix. Thus were formed the 1/1st and 2/1st Northumbrian (North Riding) Heavy Btys. The 2/1st Bty formed part of the 63rd (2nd Northumbrian) Division.

=== 1/1st Northumbrian (North Riding) Heavy Battery ===
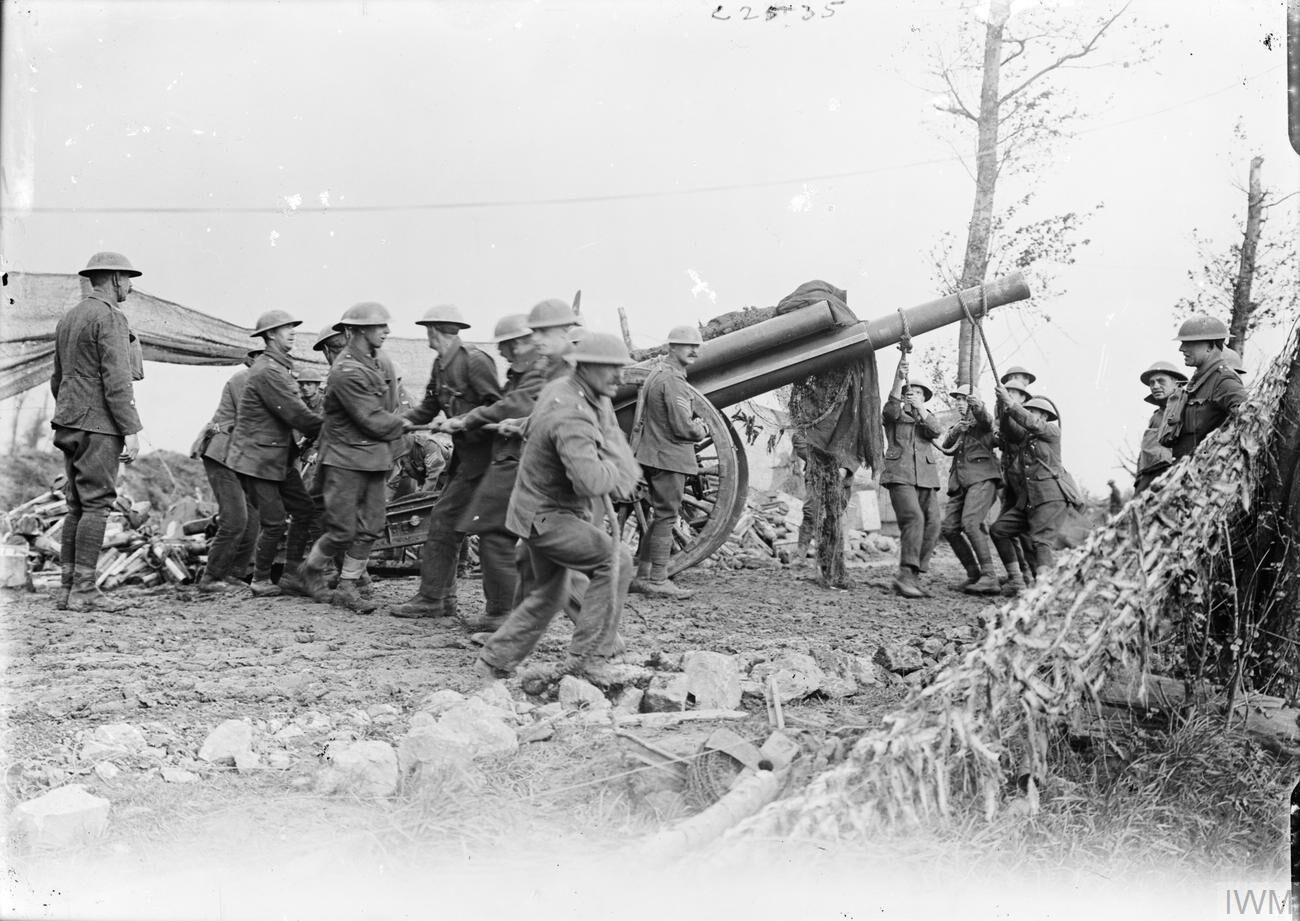
A 60-pounder gun in action, 1917.

The 1/1st Battery received its embarkation orders on 12 April 1915 and entrained for its port of embarkation on 19 April. It disembarked at Le Havre on 21 April. The Northumbrian Division completed its concentration in the area of Steenvoorde on 23 April and went into action the next day at the Battle of St Julien. The 1/1st Bty was transferred away from the Northumbrian Division on 6 May to join the XIII Brigade, RGA, and moved to positions in the angle of the Brielen–Vlamertinge–Elverdinge roads, west of the Yser Canal. It took part in the subsequent Battle of Frezenberg, engaging targets north of St Julien on 8 May, when its old 4.7-inch guns 'did fair shooting'. It remained in these positions, supporting troops in the Ypres Salient during May and June 1915.

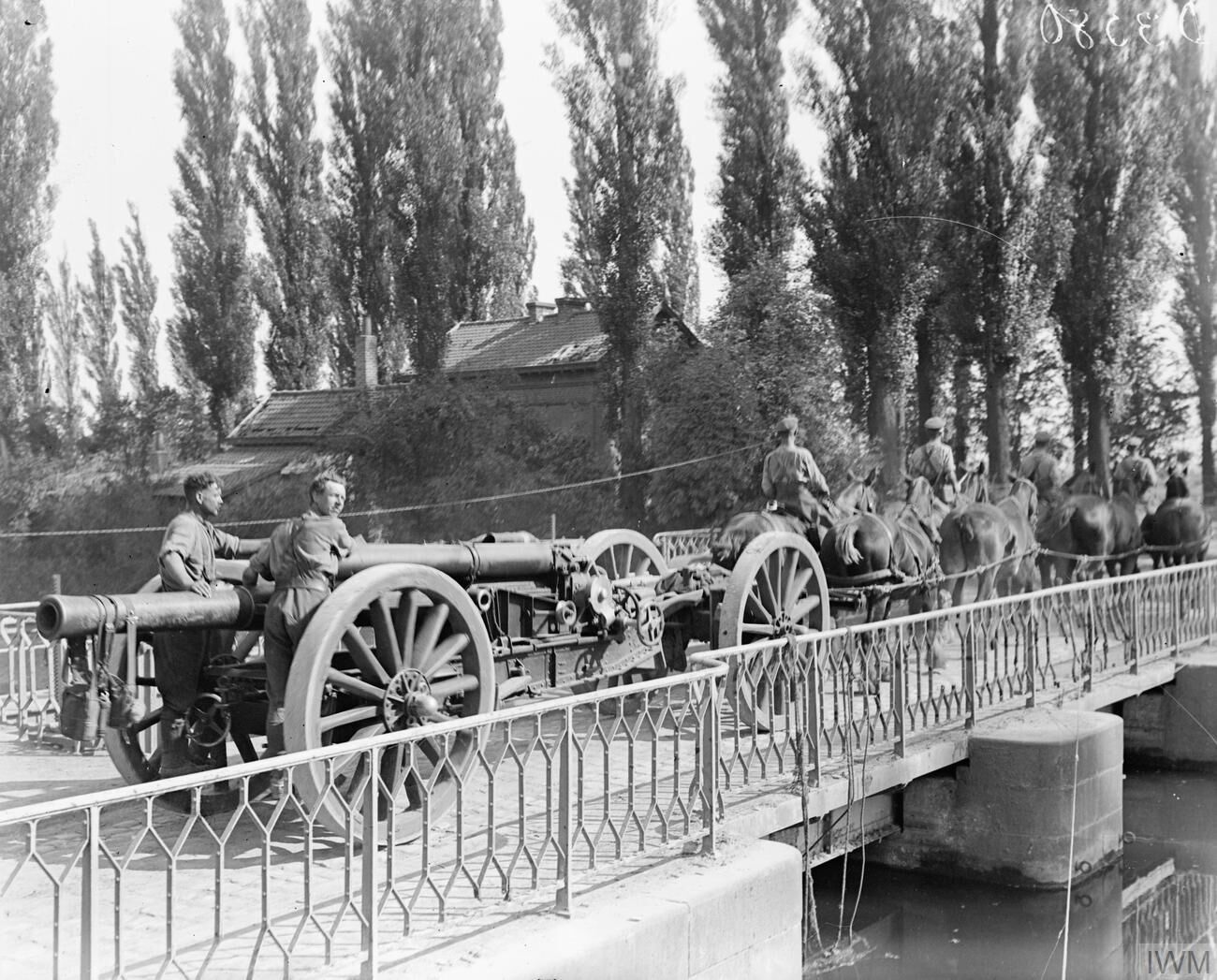
A 60-pounder gun advancing during the Hundred Days Offensive

RGA Brigades, later termed Heavy Artillery Groups (HAGs), moved around the Western Front a good deal, supporting the various armies of the British Expeditionary Force (BEF) as operations dictated. 1/1st North Riding Heavy Bty joined 41st HAG with Second Army on 5 October 1916, and then transferred to 51st HAG on 12 December 1916 in time to move to Fourth Army. On 9 February 1917, the four-gun battery was made up to six guns when it was joined by a section from 194th Heavy Battery, a New Army unit that had just arrived from England. (Note: 194th Heavy Bty had been formed at Waterloo, Aldershot, on 21 June 1916; its other section was posted to 159th Heavy Btys.) By now, the heavy batteries on the Western Front had adopted the 60-pounder in place of the 4.7-inch.

After a spell of rest and training, the battery rejoined 41st HAG with Fourth Army on 20 March 1917, remaining with it (apart from an attachment to 12th HAG with Third Army from 5 to 22 September 1917) until the end of the war. 41st HAG (renamed 41st (Mobile) Brigade RGA on 1 February 1918) served with Second Army from 1 May to 18 August 1918, and then returned to Fourth Army. In the final Hundred Days Offensive until the Armistice with Germany, the 41st Bde together with gunners of the Australian Corps supported troops of the US II Corps (which had no artillery of its own) during the 2nd Battle of Cambrai and Battle of the Selle.

=== 2/1st Northumbrian (North Riding) Heavy Battery ===
The 2nd Line TF units of the Northumbrian Division slowly assembled around Newcastle, where 2nd Northumbrian Divisional HQ opened in January 1915. While under training it was responsible for defending the coast of North East England from Seaham Harbour through Sunderland to Newcastle. In November 1915, the division moved into winter quarters in East Yorkshire, with 2/1st Bty at Hedon. However, the battery left 63rd Division on 9 November 1915 and thereafter formed part of the Tyne Garrison until the Armistice. It was disbanded between 28 November and 30 December 1918.

== Postwar ==
When the TF was reconstituted as the Territorial Army (TA) in 1920, the Northumbrian (North Riding) Heavy Bty, RGA, was reformed at Grange Road, Middlesbrough, as the 2nd North Riding Battery in the 2nd Northumbrian Brigade, Royal Field Artillery (successors to the former 2nd East Riding Artillery Volunteers, which included the old 2nd and 3rd North Riding AVCs). These were redesignated the following year as 292nd (2nd North Riding) Bty and 73rd (Northumbrian) Brigade respectively. 292nd served as the howitzer battery of the brigade, and moved to the Artillery Barracks, Lytton Street, Middlesbrough, in the late 1920s, with the St Mary's College cadet battery attached to it. When the 73rd was converted into the 62nd (Northumbrian) Anti-Aircraft Brigade in 1936, the battery became 175th (2nd North Riding) Anti-Aircraft Battery. Shortly afterwards the 62nd split to form the 85th (Tees) Heavy Anti-Aircraft Regiment, Royal Artillery, which included 175th Bty. It served in the heavy anti-aircraft role throughout World War II, including the Battle of France and Dunkirk evacuation, the Battle of Britain and Blitz, and the North African and Italian campaigns.

== Honorary Colonels ==
The following served as Honorary Colonel of the battalion:

- Admiral Thomas Chaloner, CB, 1881–84
- 1st Marquess of Zetland, KT, appointed 1894. (His son, the 2nd Marquess, served as Hon Col of the 73rd (Northumbrian) Field Brigade and 62nd (Northumbrian) HAA Regiment from 1932).

== Insignia ==
The 1st and 3rd North Yorkshire AVCs wore a distinctive forage or field service cap badge consisting of a Yorkshire Rose surrounded by a strap bearing the words '1st [or 3rd] N.R. YORK VOLUNTEER ARTILLERY', surmounted by a crown. The waistbelt clasp of the 1st AVC bore the same badge, while that of the 3rd Corps had the Coat of arms of Scarborough within a strap bearing the words '3rd N.R.Y. ARTILLERY VOLS. SCARBRO'. The early pattern of officers' full dress pouch in the 3rd AVC also bore the town's arms. Standard pattern helmet plates were worn from 1878 with the wording on the scrolls reflecting the changes in the unit's title.
