= Dunkirk (disambiguation) =

Dunkirk (French: Dunkerque) is a town and port in northern France.

Dunkirk may also refer to:

== Places ==
=== United Kingdom ===
- Dunkirk, Cambridgeshire, a location in the United Kingdom
- Dunkirk, Cheshire, see National Cycle Route 56
- Dunkirk, Gloucestershire
- Dunkirk, Kent, a village between Faversham and Canterbury
- Dunkirk, Norfolk, a location in the United Kingdom
- Dunkirk, Nottingham
- Dunkirk, Staffordshire, a location in the United Kingdom
- Dunkirk, Wiltshire

=== United States ===
- Dunkirk, Indiana, a city in Jay and Blackford counties
- Dunkirk, Cass County, Indiana
- Dunkirk, Kansas, an unincorporated community
- Dunkirk, Maryland
- Dunkirk, New York, a city
- Dunkirk (town), New York, surrounding the city of Dunkirk
- Dunkirk, Ohio
- Dunkirk, Wisconsin, a town
- Dunkirk (community), Wisconsin, an unincorporated community in the town of Dunkirk

== Arts and entertainment ==
- Dunkirk (1958 film), a British war film
- Dunkirk (2017 film), a film directed by Christopher Nolan
- Dunkirk (TV series), 2004 BBC docudrama
- "Dunkirk", an episode of Strange Experiences
- Dunkirk: The Battle of France, a board wargame
- "Dunkirk", a track on The Snow Goose by the British band Camel

== Military ==
- Battle of Dunkirk (disambiguation), various military actions in and around Dunkirk, since the 14th century
- Dunkirk evacuation, a 1940 military operation during World War II
- Dunkirkers or Dunkirk Privateers, naval force at the service of the Spanish Monarchy during the 16th and 17th centuries

== Sport ==
- Dunkirk (American horse), an American racehorse
- Dunkirk (British horse), a British National Hunt racehorse
- Dunkirk F.C., an English non-league football club

== Vessels ==
- HMS Dunkirk, the name of four British navy ships
