= Dunstall (disambiguation) =

Dunstall is a village in Staffordshire, England.

Dunstall may also refer to:

== People ==
- Jason Dunstall (born 1964), Australian rules footballer
- John Dunstall (died 1693), engraver

== Other ==
- Dunstall, DMV at SK880939
- Dunstall Common, village in Worcestershire, England
- Dunstall Hall, mansion in Staffordshire
- Dunstall Hill, inner-city area of Wolverhampton
- Norton Dunstall, motorcycle
