= Chaloner baronets =

Extinct baronetcy in the Baronetage of England

The Baronetcy of Chaloner of Guisborough was created in the Baronetage of England on 20 June 1620 for William Chaloner and was extinct on his death in Turkey in 1641. The Chaloners acquired their estate at Guisborough in 1558 following the dissolution of Gisborough Priory. Their seat was at Gisborough Hall.

== Chaloner of Guisborough (1620) ==
- Sir William Chaloner, 1st Baronet (1587–1641)

== See also ==
- Baron Gisborough
- Thomas Chaloner (statesman)
- Thomas Chaloner (courtier)
