= Zetland FM =

Redcar; England
- Broadcast area: Redcar and Cleveland
- Frequency: 105.0 MHz

Programming
- Format: Community radio

History
- First air date: 31 August 2015

Technical information
- ERP: 26 watts

Links
- Website: www.zetlandfm.co.uk

Zetland FM is a community radio station broadcasting from Redcar and covering the Redcar and Cleveland district in North East England. Its studios are located within the Redcar Beacon on the town's seafront.

== History ==
Zetland FM was awarded a full-time community radio licence by Ofcom in October 2013 and launched its service on 31 August 2015.

In 2018, the station's studios and a number of its presenters appeared prominently in the BBC documentary series The Mighty Redcar. In November 2020, breakfast presenter Julie Donaldson died as a result of the COVID-19 pandemic.

== Programming ==
The station's programming consists of pop music from the past forty years, together with local speech and information features focusing on the Redcar district. It is the only radio station broadcasting specifically to Redcar and Cleveland, as other stations within the area have a wider Tees Valley or north east England focus. The station partners with other local businesses and organisations to promote training and employment opportunities in local industry.

Zetland FM's Key Commitments state that it must broadcast original output for six hours a day, and that speech programming should include "local news, sport, weather, community and event information, interviews and discussions".

== Transmission ==
Zetland FM broadcasts on a frequency of 105.0 MHz with a power of 26 watts, vertically polarised. The station's transmitter site is at a farm near the village of Dunsdale, to the south of the town.

== See also ==
Zetland (lifeboat)
