= Battle of Dunkirk (disambiguation) =

The Battle of Dunkirk was a conflict between French and British allies and German forces in 1940 during the Second World War.

Battle of Dunkirk, Raid on Dunkirk or Siege of Dunkirk may also refer to:

- Battle of Dunkirk (1383), a battle between English and Franco-Flemish forces during Revolt of Ghent (1379–1385)#The revolt continues under Frans Ackerman
- Battle of Dunkirk (1639), a naval action during the Eighty Years' War between a Dutch fleet and the Spanish Dunkirk Squadron on 18 February
- Siege of Dunkirk (1646), a siege by Dutch and French forces against a Spanish garrison during the Thirty Years' War
- Battle of the Dunes (1658) or the Battle of Dunkirk, a battle between Allied and Spanish forces
- Siege of Dunkirk (1793), a siege by British and Hanoverian forces against a French garrison during the French Revolutionary War
- Raid on Dunkirk (1800), a conflict between British and French naval forces during the French Revolutionary War
- Siege of Dunkirk (1944–1945), a siege by Allied forces against a German garrison during the Second World War

== See also ==
- Dunkirk (disambiguation)
- Dunkirk evacuation, a major military operation that took place during the 1940 Battle of Dunkirk
