= Gisborough Moor =

Upland area in North York Moors, England

Coordinates: 54.50207°N 1.02250°W

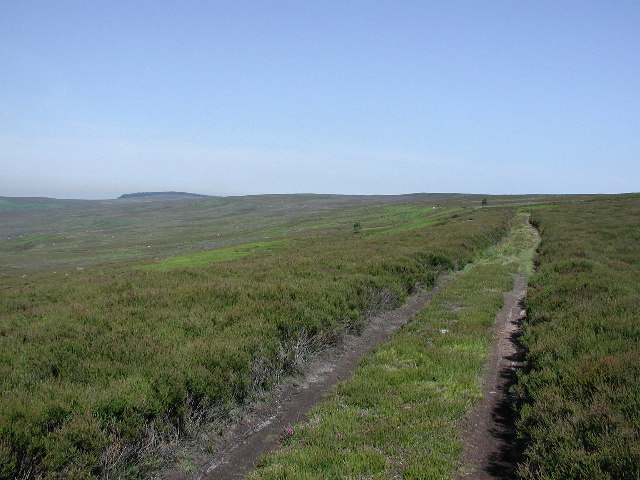
- The 'broad flat moor'. The summit is the slight rise on the left.

Highest point
- Elevation: 328 m (1,076 ft)
- Prominence: 152 m (499 ft)
- Listing: Marilyn, County Top

Geography
- Location: North York Moors, England
- OS grid: NZ634123
- Topo map: OS Landranger 94

Gisborough Moor is part of England's North York Moors, lying to the south of the town of Guisborough. The summit is a broad flat ridge, with the highest point at the southern end, some 1 mile (1.5 km) south of a trig point. The moor is crossed by a number of footpaths leading between the Cleveland Way and Commondale and other settlements to the south. Highcliff Nab, near the moor's north-western corner, overlooks Guisborough from the edge of the scarp.

0.9 miles (1.4 km) from the highest point of the moor, on nearby Commondale Moor, (Grid reference NZ6469 1175) is a First World War memorial to two friends who worked on the Gisborough Estate and who left for London in 1914 to join the Grenadier Guards. One died on the Somme in 1916 (his body was never found) and the other died of his wounds in 1920. The memorial is now grade II listed.

2 miles (3.2 km) away, on nearby Great Ayton Moor (Grid reference NZ6020 1241), was the location of a Starfish site during the Second World War. A series of tanks were erected on the moor and filled with flammable liquid. When Luftwaffe bombing attacks were imminent, the liquid was set on fire and quenched so that the steam looked like a burning town or city. This fooled the Germans into harmlessly bombing the moor instead of the nearby industrial town of Middlesbrough, which was a few miles to the north west.
