= Guisborough Town Hall =

Municipal building in Guisborough, North Yorkshire, England

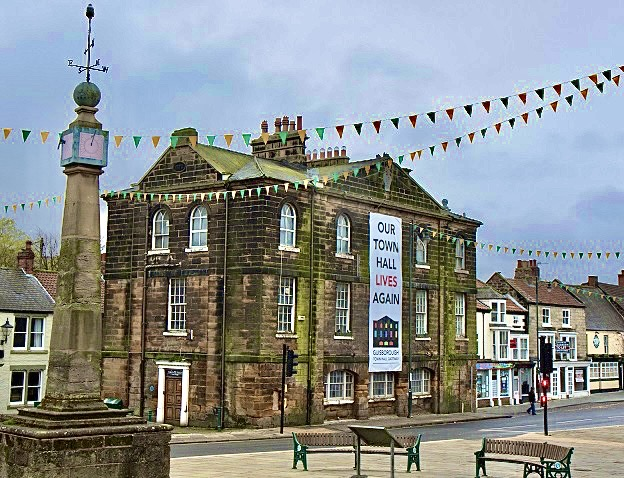
- Guisborough Town Hall in 2017

- Shown in North Yorkshire
- 54.5357°N 1.0514°W
- Location: Westgate, Guisborough

History
- Built: 1821

Site notes
- Architectural style: Neoclassical style
- Restored: 2021
- Website: Town Hall Gateway

Listed Building – Grade II
- Official name: Town Hall
- Designated: 25 April 1984
- Reference no.: 1329572

Guisborough Town Hall is a municipal building on Westgate in Guisborough, North Yorkshire, England. The structure, which has mainly been used as a venue for magistrates' court hearings, is a Grade II listed building.

== History ==
The first building on the site was a medieval tollbooth which enabled Sir Thomas Chaloner and his descendants, who were the lords of the manor, to collect tolls from pilgrims travelling to Gisborough Priory. The tollbooth was demolished in the early 19th century to make way for the current building.

The current building was designed in the neoclassical style, built in sandstone and was completed in 1821. The stone was recovered from a 16th-century manor house known as Tocketts Hall, which had been the home of General John Hale: Hale had married into the Chaloner family and the house subsequently came into the ownership of the politician, Robert Chaloner, shortly before it was demolished in the early 19th century. The town hall was initially arcaded with a shambles on the ground floor and an assembly room on the first floor; a second floor was added in 1870. The design involved a symmetrical main frontage with five bays facing onto Westgate; there were three segmental windows on the ground floor, five sash windows on the first floor and five rounded headed windows on the second floor. The central section of three bays was flanked by full-height pilasters supporting a pediment containing a cartouche with the coat of arms of the Chaloner family in the tympanum.

In the 19th century the magistrates held petty sessions in the building once a fortnight and the lord of the manor held his hearings in the building once a year. Although the area became an urban district in 1894, rather than using the town hall, the new council established itself in council offices in Fountain Street. Instead the town hall continued to be used for magistrates' court hearings and also accommodated the offices of several firms of solicitors. Ownership of the town hall subsequently passed to a pub company which got into financial difficulties: after becoming vacant in 2013, the building was acquired by Redcar and Cleveland Borough Council at auction in September 2015.

== Renovations ==
Following the award of grants of £1.1 million from the National Lottery Heritage Fund and £300,000 from the Tees Valley Combined Authority, work started on the refurbishment of the building in January 2021. The building was renovated by the Durham based firm, Hall Construction, and the local Guisborough firm, Sollet Bros: works include the conversion of the ground floor for use as a heritage and information centre and as a retail unit, and the conversion of the upper floors for use as visitor accommodation and as commercial space. The building has 479.6 square metres (5,162 sq ft) of available floor area for tenants, of which the council plans the upper floors to become accommodation to support Guisborough's tourism industry.

The building officially re-opened on 9 April 2022 – featuring a gin distillery, accommodation, and a community information and heritage centre.

== Gallery ==
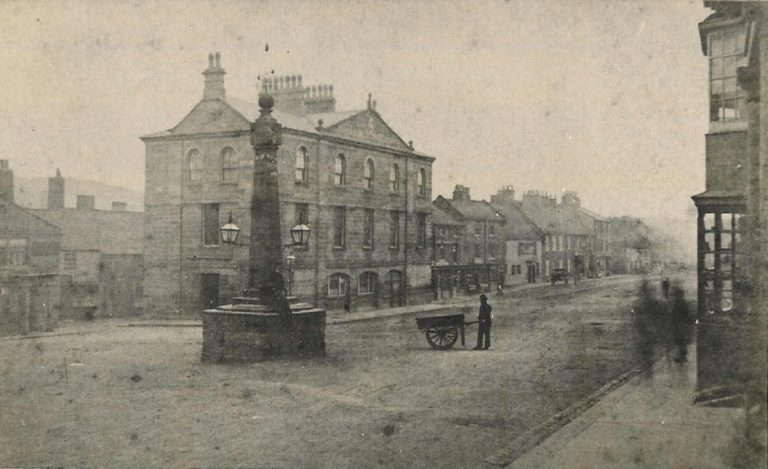
Photo of Guisborough Town Hall c. 1880.

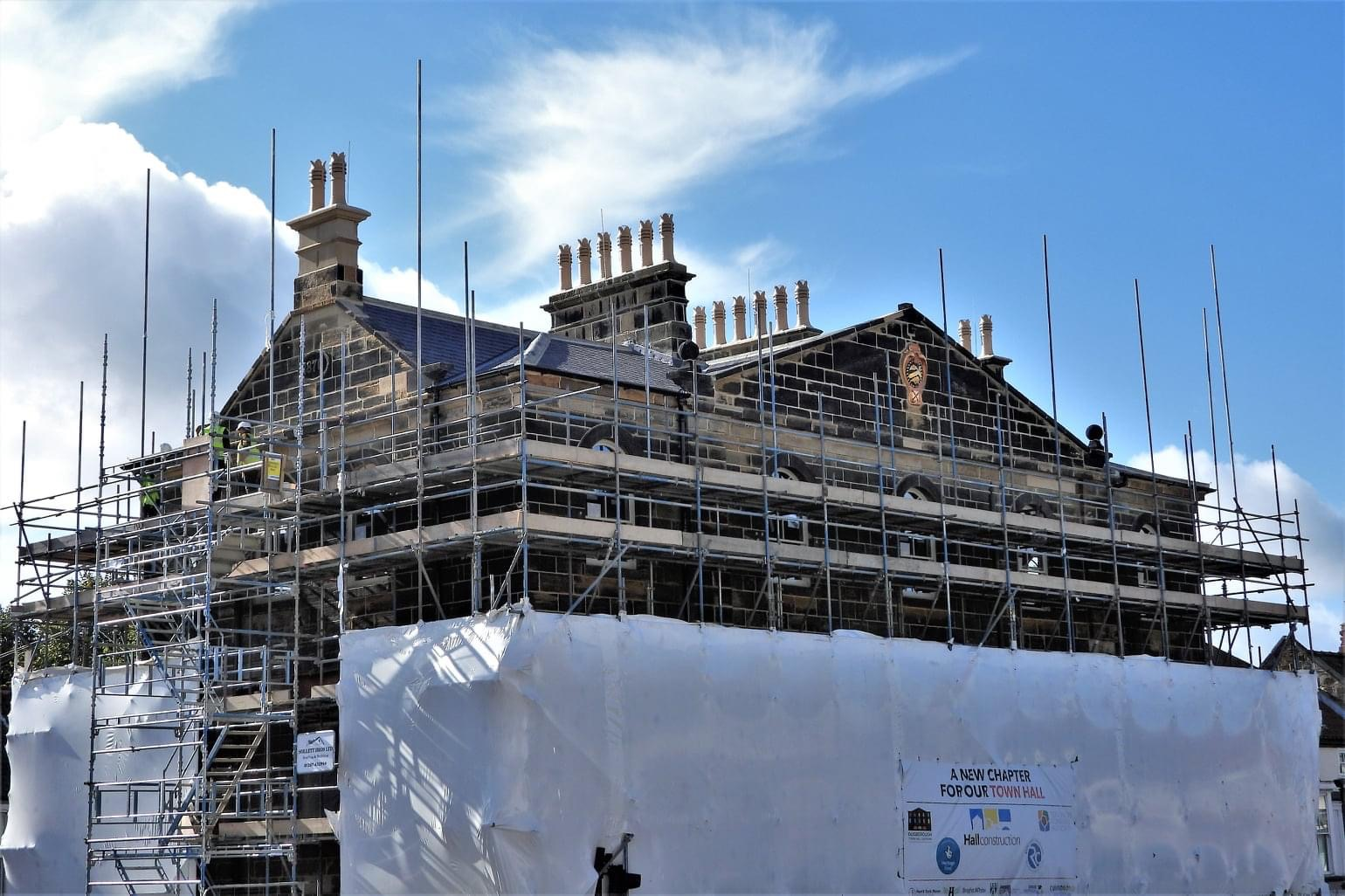
Photo of Guisborough Town Hall during renovations, 1 October 2021
