= Newton under Roseberry =

Village in North Yorkshire, England

Coordinates: 54.510°N 1.120°W

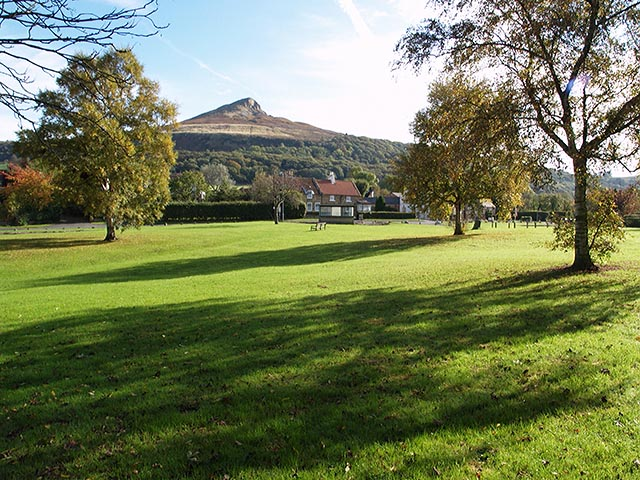
- The village green at Newton under Roseberry with Roseberry Topping in the distance

- Location within North Yorkshire
- Civil parish: Guisborough
- Unitary authority: Redcar and Cleveland
- Ceremonial county: North Yorkshire
- Region: North East
- Country: England
- Sovereign state: United Kingdom
- Police: Cleveland
- Fire: Cleveland
- Ambulance: North East

Newton under Roseberry is a village in the civil parish of Guisborough, in the borough of Redcar and Cleveland and the ceremonial county of North Yorkshire, England. It is on the A173, between Great Ayton and Guisborough and is close to the base of Roseberry Topping.

The village is situated near the edge of the North York Moors National Park, and also close to the border of Redcar and Cleveland with Middlesbrough and the North Yorkshire district.

== In popular culture ==
A reference to Newton under Roseberry was featured in the folk-rock group America's "Hat Trick" from the Hat Trick album. The exact lyric stanza is:

Newton-Under-Roseberry-Topping
And it's cold and it's wet
And you feel like you're part of all time

== Religion ==
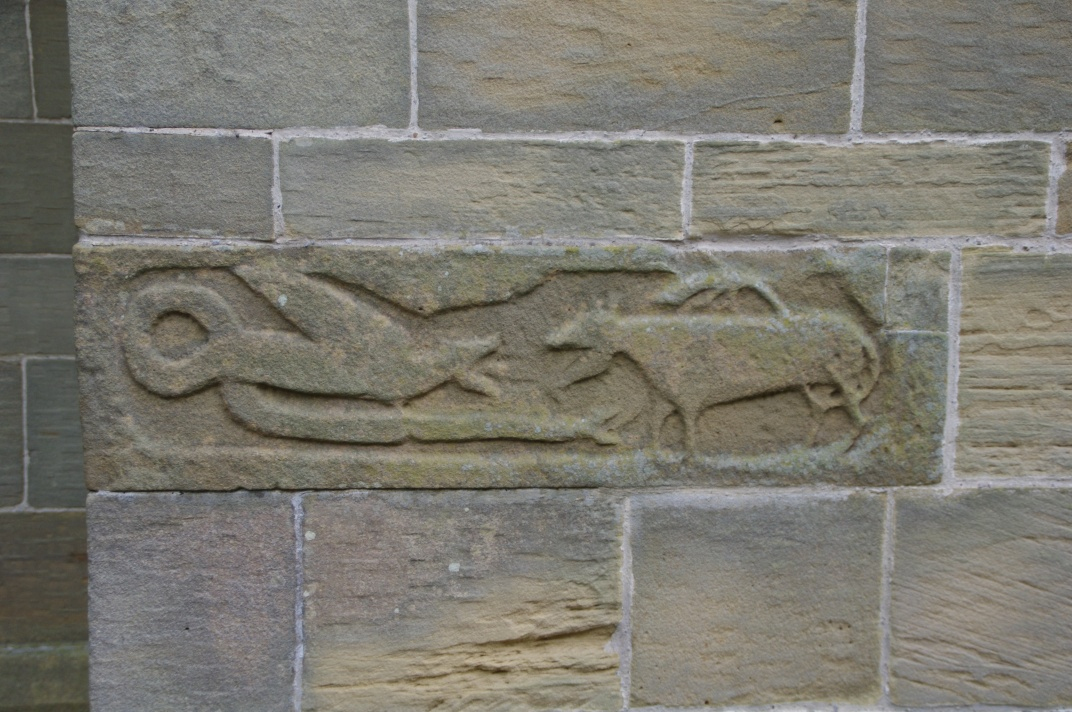
Anglo Saxon carving on St Oswald's

The Anglican church of St Oswald's is a Grade II* listed building, with an Anglo-Saxon carving.

== Demographics ==
In 1971 the parish had a population of 172.

== History ==
Newton was formerly a chapelry in the parish of Pickering, in 1866 Newton became a separate civil parish and on 1 April 1974 the parish was abolished and merged with Guisborough.
