= John Bulmer (cricketer) =

English cricketer

John Robert Leopold Bulmer (28 December 1867 – 20 January 1917) was an English first-class cricketer, who played in the 1891 Roses match at Bradford Park Avenue, for Yorkshire County Cricket Club in 1891. A right arm fast medium bowler he took one wicket for 79, and recorded a pair with the bat as Yorkshire fell to defeat by 8 wickets.

Born in Guisborough, Yorkshire, England, in present-day Redcar and Cleveland, Bulmer also played for the Yorkshire Second XI in 1897.

He died aged 49, in January 1917, in Werneth, Oldham, Lancashire.
