= Guisborough =

Market town in North Yorkshire, England

Coordinates: 54.5350°N 1.0563°W

- Town
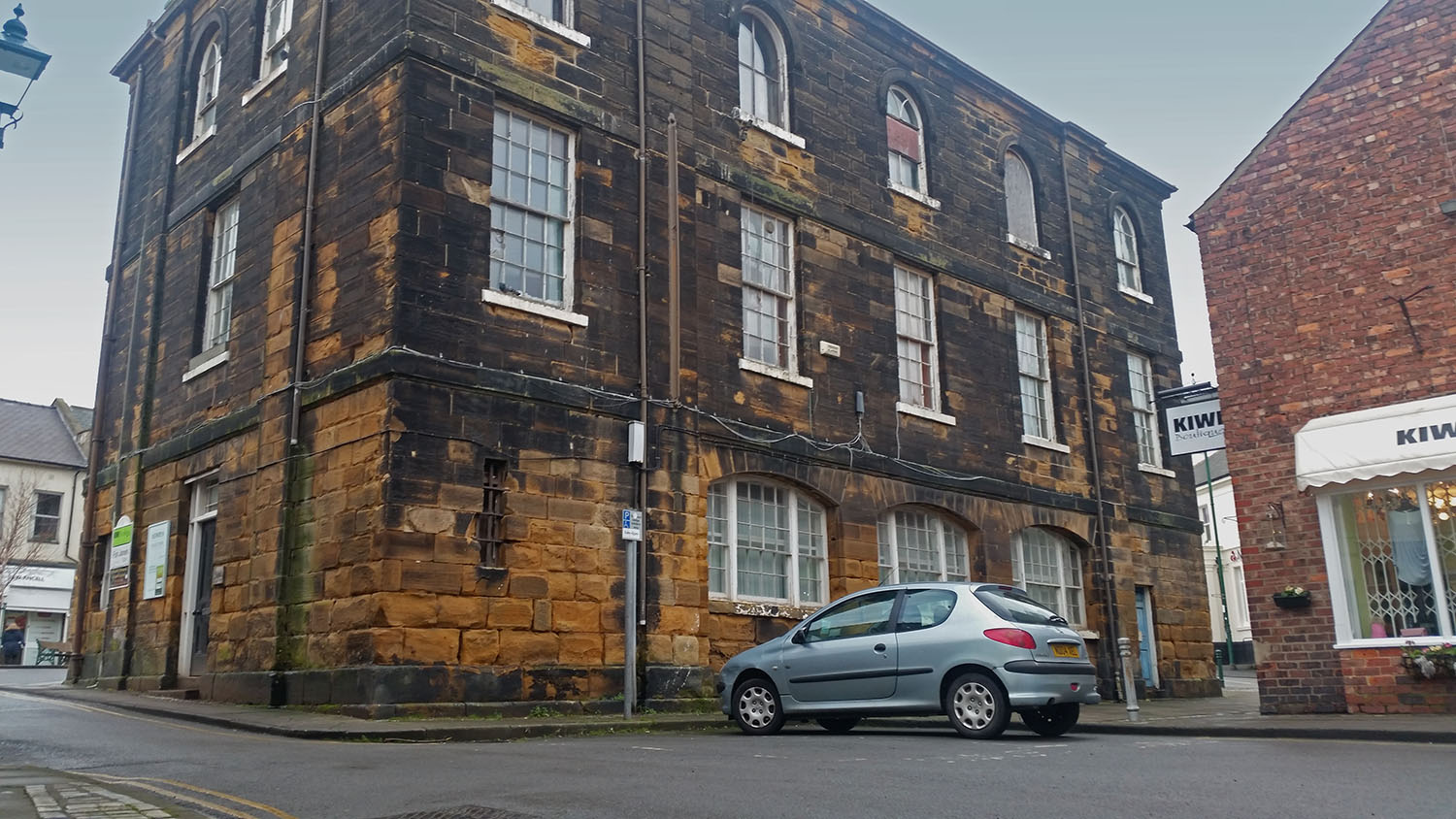
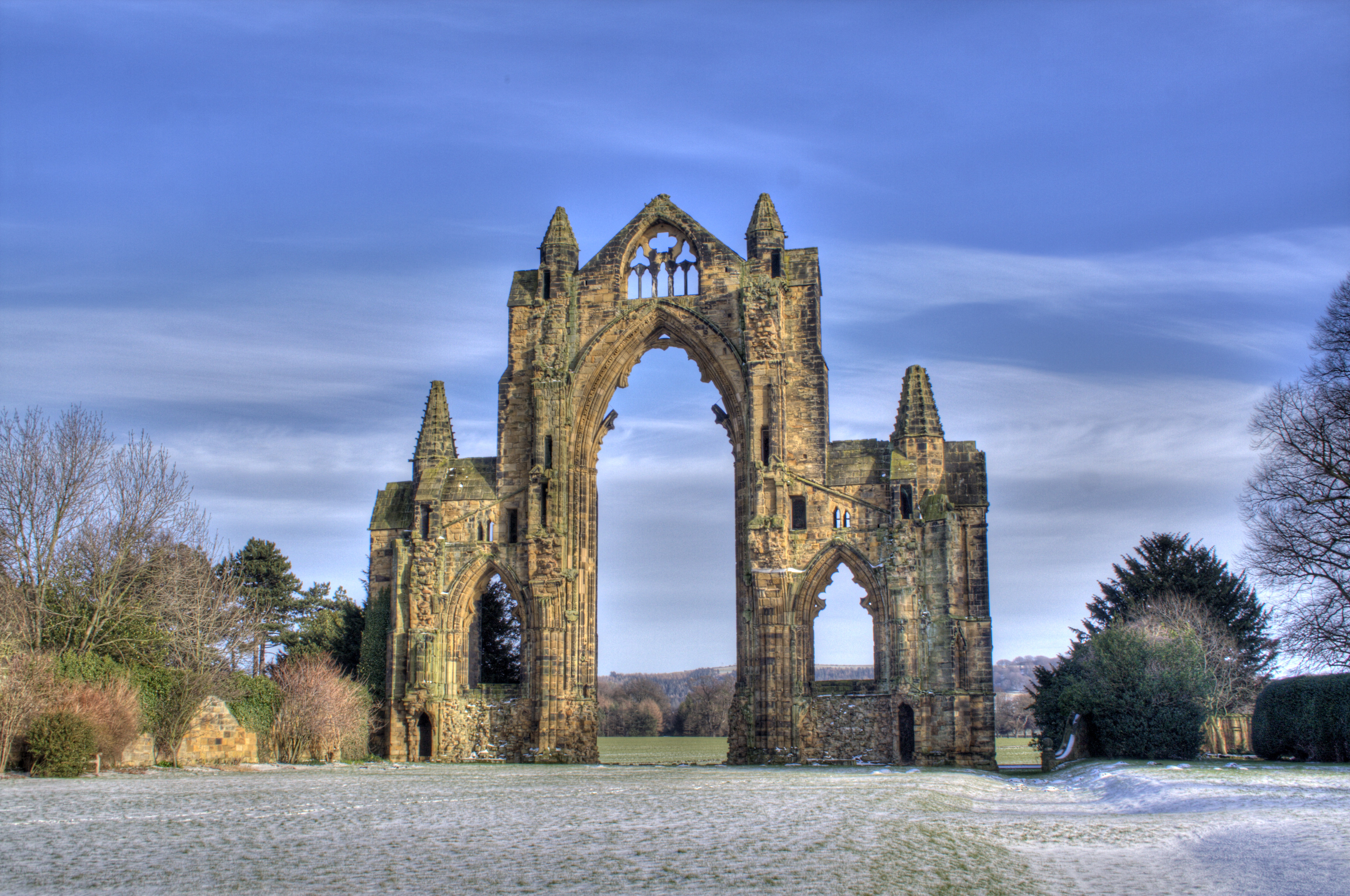
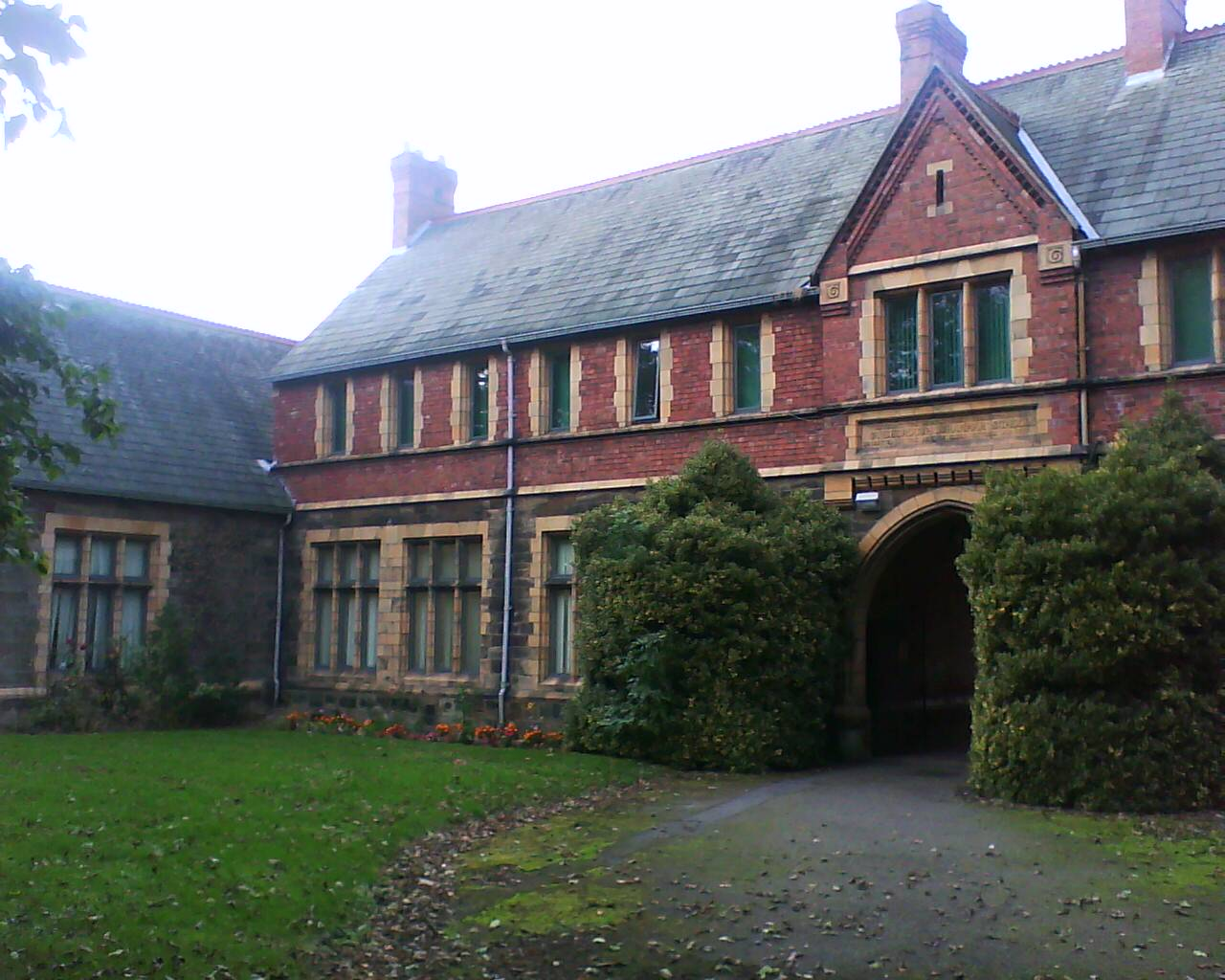
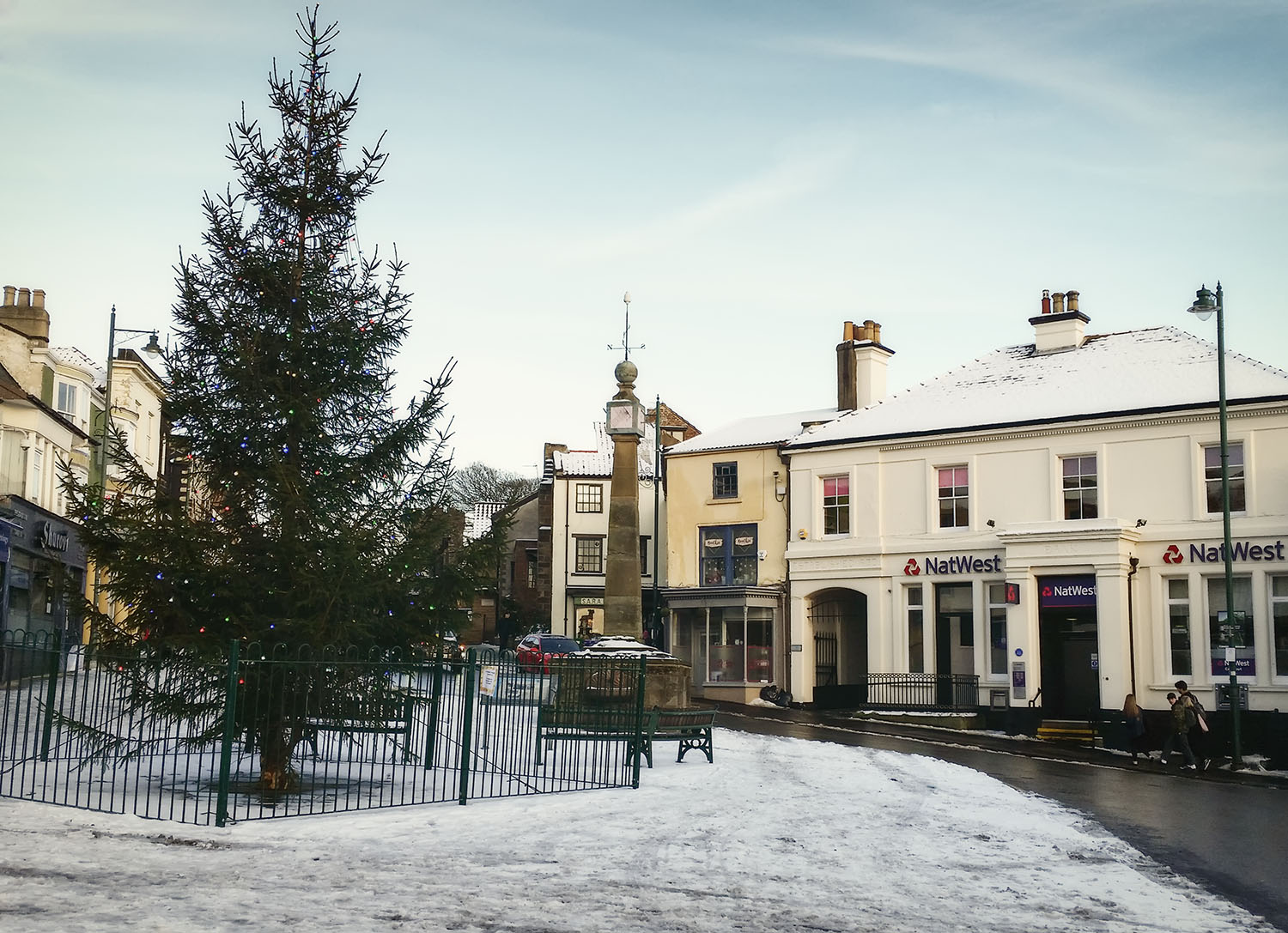
- Guisborough Town Hall Gisborough Hall Gisborough Priory Prior Pursglove College Market Cross

- Location within North Yorkshire
- Population: 16,979 (town 2011)
- OS grid reference: NZ610159
  - London: 255.1 miles
- Civil parish: Guisborough
- Unitary authority: Redcar and Cleveland
- Ceremonial county: North Yorkshire
- Region: North East
- Country: England
- Sovereign state: United Kingdom
- Post town: GUISBOROUGH
- Postcode district: TS14
- Dialling code: 01287
- Police: Cleveland
- Fire: Cleveland
- Ambulance: North East
- UK Parliament: Middlesbrough South and East Cleveland
- Website: Guisborough Town Council

Guisborough (/ˈɡɪzbərə/ GHIZ-bər-ə) is a market town and civil parish in the borough of Redcar and Cleveland, North Yorkshire, England. It lies north of the North York Moors National Park. Roseberry Topping, midway between the town and Great Ayton, is a landmark in the national park. It was governed by an urban district and rural district in the North Riding of Yorkshire.

At the 2011 census, the civil parish with outlying Upleatham, Dunsdale and Newton under Roseberry had a population of 17,777, of which 16,979 were in the town's built-up area.

== Etymology ==
Assessing the origin of the name Guisborough, Albert Hugh Smith commented that it was "difficult". From its first attestation in the Domesday Book into the 16th century, the second part sometimes derived from the originally Old English word burh ('town, fortification') and sometimes from the Old English word -burn ('stream'). It seems that the settlement was simply known by both names, the -burh/-borough forms predominate in the historical record and this survives today.

The origin of the first element is uncertain: Smith's best guess was from the Old Norse personal name Gígr in its genitive Gígs. If so, Guisborough once meant "Gígr's town". To this day the first element has a different spelling for the town from Gisborough Priory and Gisborough Hall in the town.

== History ==
=== Roman ===
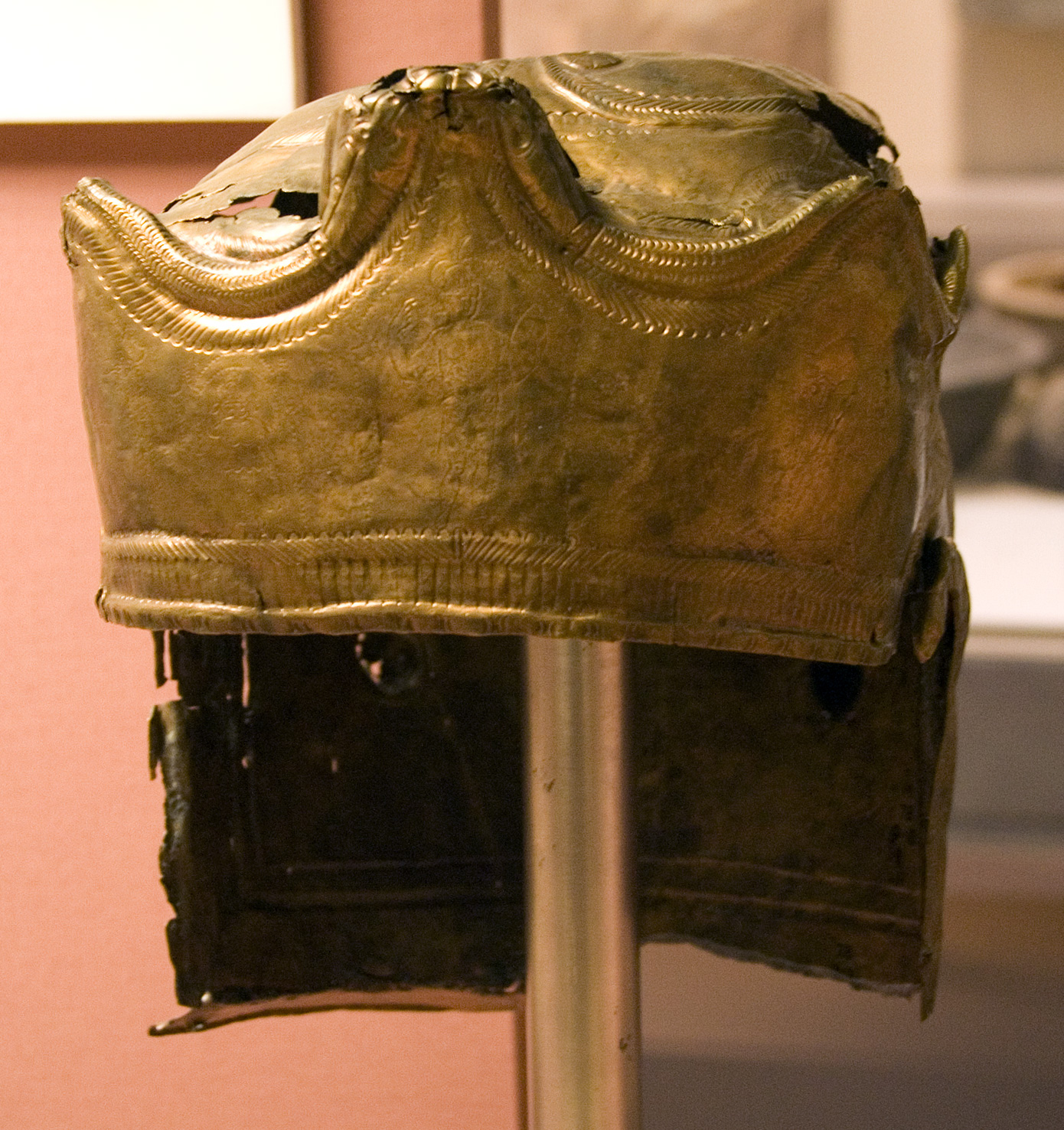
Guisborough Helmet

Some archaeologists date the town to the Roman occupation, when it may have been a military fortification. The discoveries of a few Roman artefacts such as the elaborate ceremonial Guisborough Helmet, support this but proof is still lacking.

The Guisborough Helmet is a Roman cavalry helmet found near the town in 1864. Its original protective cheek-pieces have not survived but the attachment holes can be seen in front of the helmet's ear guards. It is lavishly decorated with engraved and embossed figures indicating that it was probably used for display or cavalry tournaments, although possibly for battle as well. It was unearthed in what appears to be a carefully arranged deposition in a bed of gravel, distant from any known Roman sites. After its recovery during roadworks it was donated to the British Museum for restoration and display.

=== De Brus ===
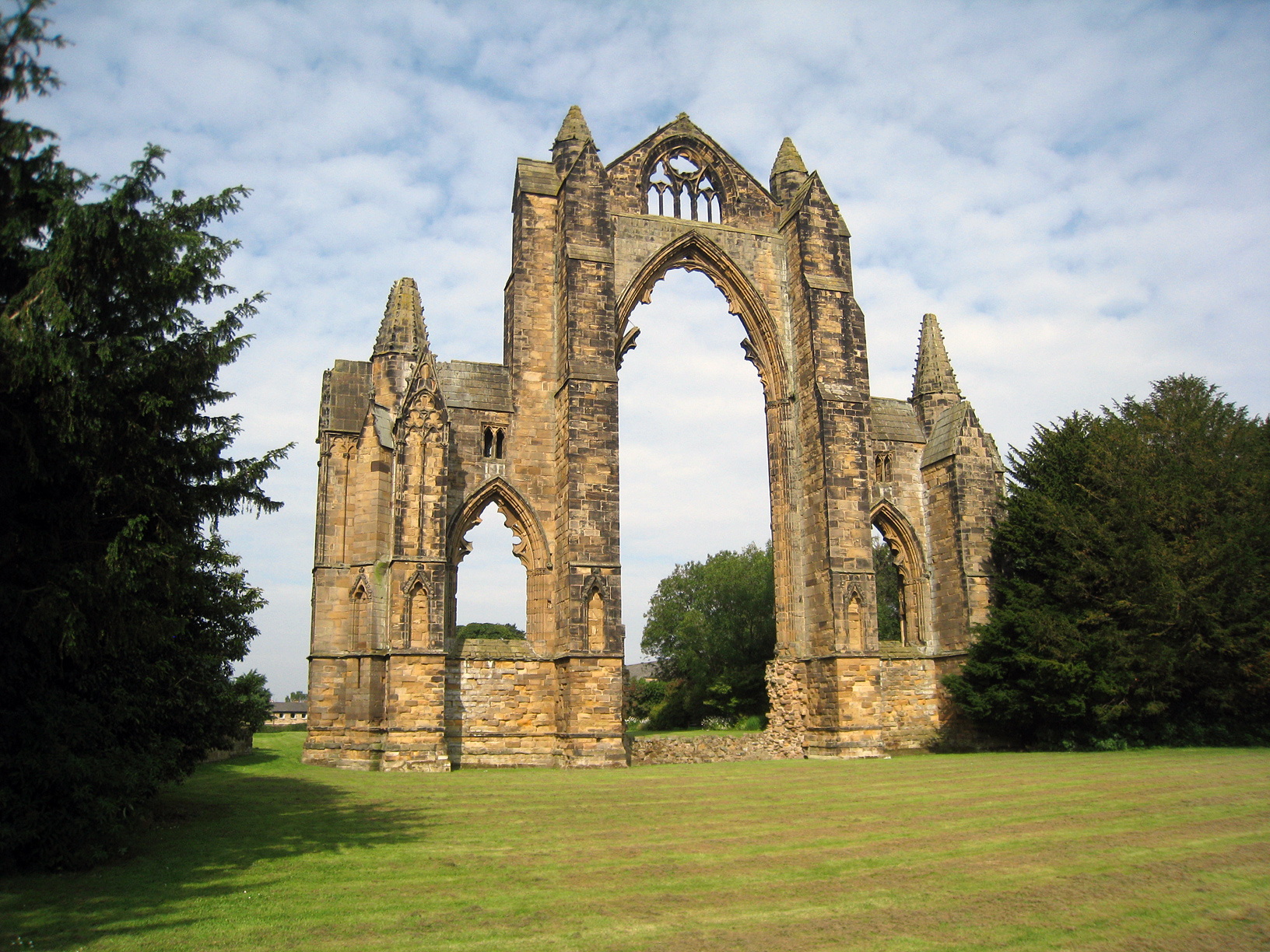
Gisborough Priory

Gighesbore is recorded in the Domesday Book in 1086 as a place within Langbaurgh Wapentake or hundred. To this day the town has two spellings, the more common spelling with a "u" and the spelling without for the priory, Gisborough Hall (16th century, demolished and rebuilt) and some other features associated with the town.

The ruined Gisborough Priory dates from the 12th century, founded by the Robert de Brus, 1st Lord of Skelton, and burial site of the lord and the next three succeeding lords of Annandale. All four ancestors of King Robert the Bruce (the seventh lord of Annandale).

=== Challoner ===
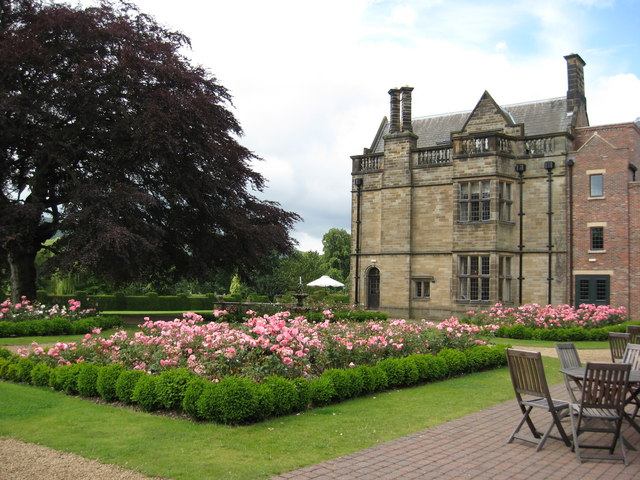
Gisborough Hall

After the dissolution of the monasteries by Henry VIII, in 1540, the lands of Gisborough Priory were given to Thomas Chaloner. The Chaloner or Challoner name continues to be associated with the town through to present day, as employers of Alum works in the 1600s, the names adoption by the Longe family as barons Gisborough and various iterations of Gisborough Hall being built. The current Gisborough Hall, a Victorian era (built in 1856) Jacobean revival style mansion. It is a Grade II listed building, during WWII it was used by the army, became a nursing home then its current use as a hotel.

Hearth Tax of 1673 in Guisborough (the town had 203 dwellings.)
# of hearths	House/s	Other information
17	1	Owned by Edward Challoner
10	1	Owned by James Lynne
7	1	Owned by Thomas Wilson
5 or 6	7	
3 or 4	28	
1 or 2	105	
1	68	below tax threshold

=== Iron ===
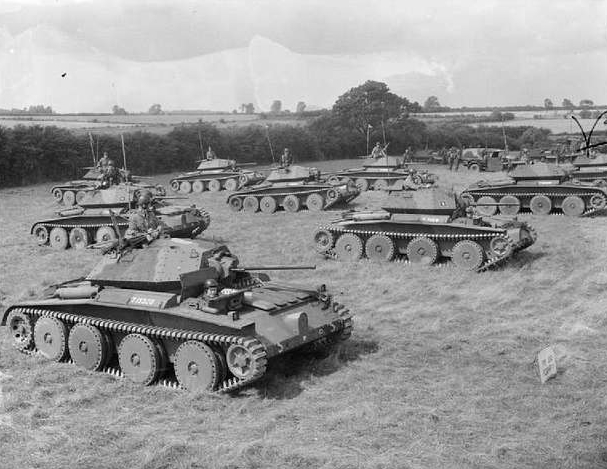
Covenanter tanks of the Fife and Forfar Yeomanry, 9th Armoured Division, on parade near the town, 19 August 1941.

The town shared in the prosperity of the Industrial Revolution by being close to the ironstone mines of the North York Moors. One of the area's ironfounders, Sir Joseph Whitwell Pease, chose as his country seat the Gothic revival Hutton Hall designed by Alfred Waterhouse, at Hutton Lowcross, near Guisborough.

Guisborough station was on the Middlesbrough–Guisborough branch of the North Eastern Railway; it closed in 1964. Extensive residential development occurred in the 1960s and 1970s, linked to the expansion of the chemical industry at Wilton and the steel industry at Redcar.

== Governance ==
Guisborough Town Council

Type
- Type: Town Council

Meeting place
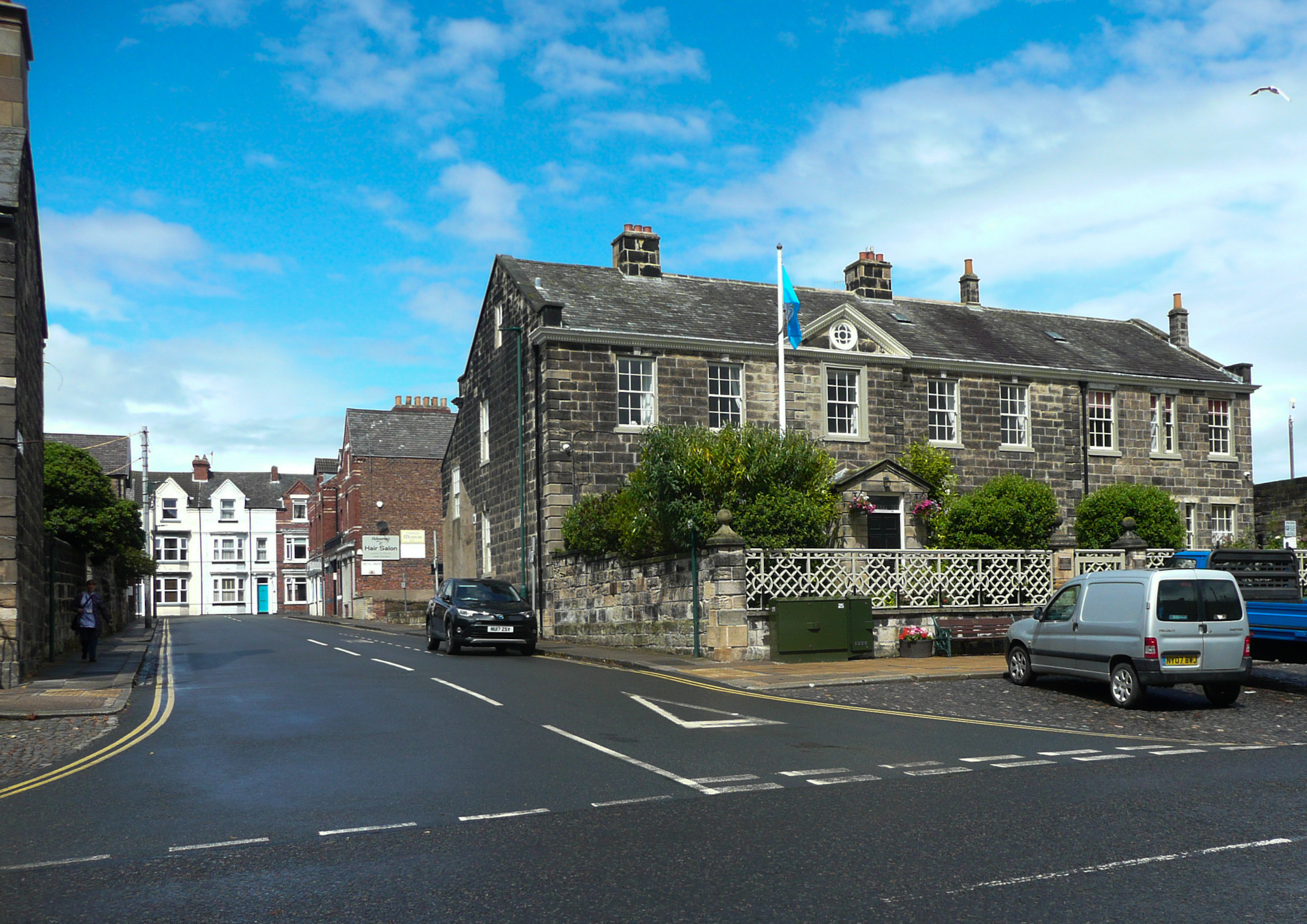
- Sunnyfield House

Website
- www.guisboroughtowncouncil.co.uk

Guisborough's county authority since 1889, the North Riding of Yorkshire, was disbanded in 1974. The town was in the county of Cleveland's Langbaurgh borough from 1974 to 1996 and is now in the Redcar and Cleveland unitary authority borough of North Yorkshire.

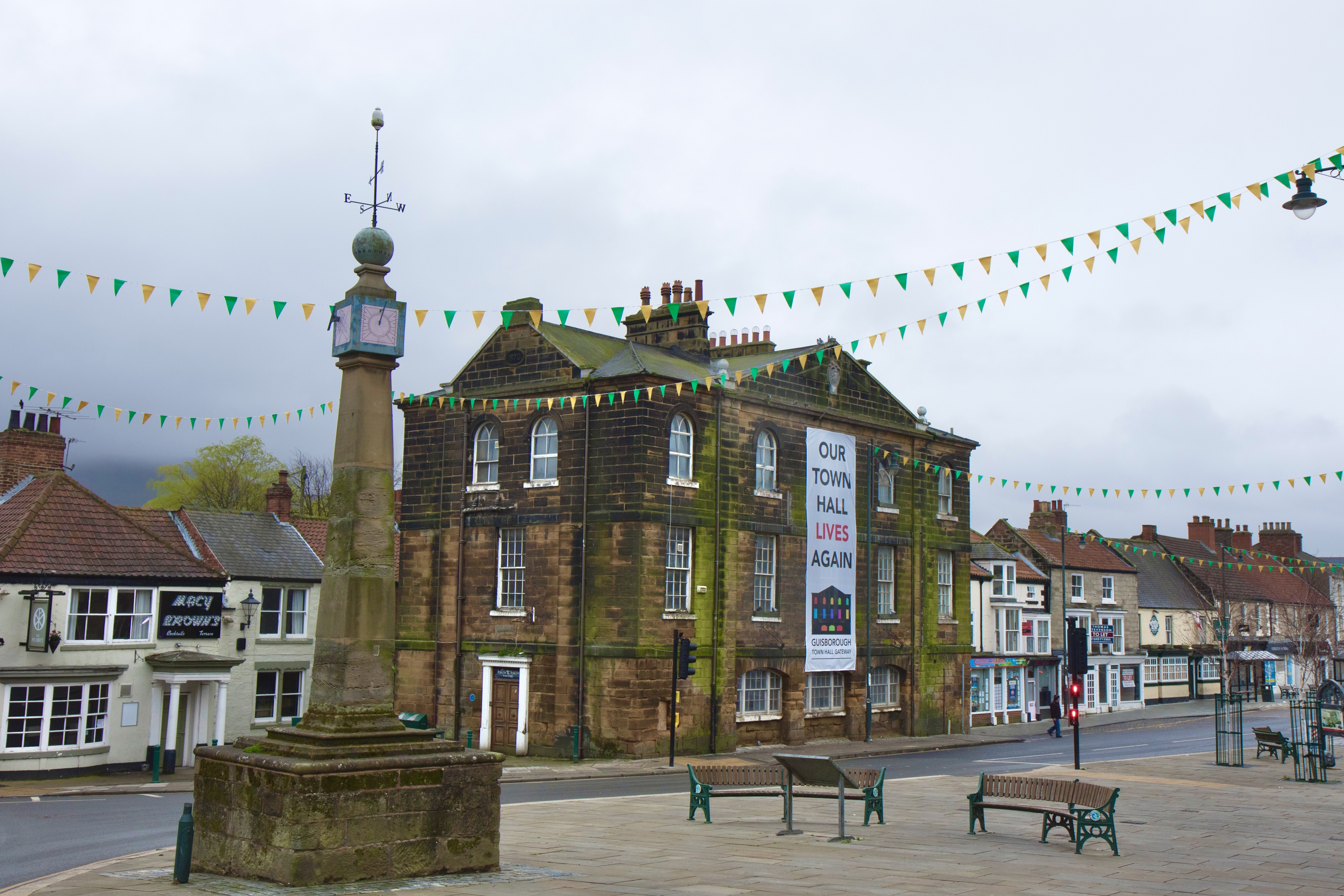
Guisborough Town Hall

Guisborough Town Hall was built on Westgate in 1821. When built, it was arcaded with shambles on the ground floor and an assembly room on the first. The two-storey building was topped with a third storey in 1870. In 2015 Redcar and Cleveland Council acquired the building at auction and subsequently announced plans to redevelop it with financial support from the National Lottery Heritage Fund and Tees Valley Combined Authority, the building reopened in April 2022. This building now hosts tea afternoons on Thursdays.

== Religion ==
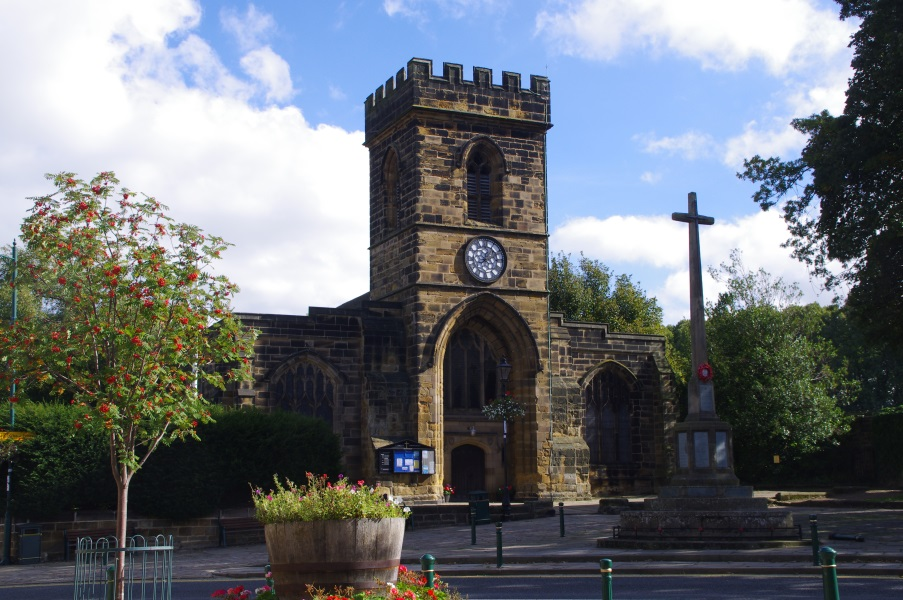
St Nicholas Church

The Anglican Church of St Nicholas houses the De Brus Cenotaph. A church may have existed here in 1290. The chancel of the present one dates from the late 15th century and the nave and interior have been altered. The church in its present form resulted from major rebuilding in 1903–1908, to a design by Temple Moore.

== Community ==
Chaloner Street

Guisborough is the home of the East Cleveland Explorer Scout Unit for those aged 14–18, affiliated to the Scout Association. Activities include work on The Duke of Edinburgh's Award, Young Leaders volunteering, and over 200 different adventure activities. It has about 30 members. The 3rd Guisborough Scout Group (The Pioneers) at Belmangate was established in 1974.

There is also a group of volunteer trail builders working to provide free mountain-bike trails in the local forest. Local musicians are catered for at an open mic/jam session every Wednesday night.

== Education ==
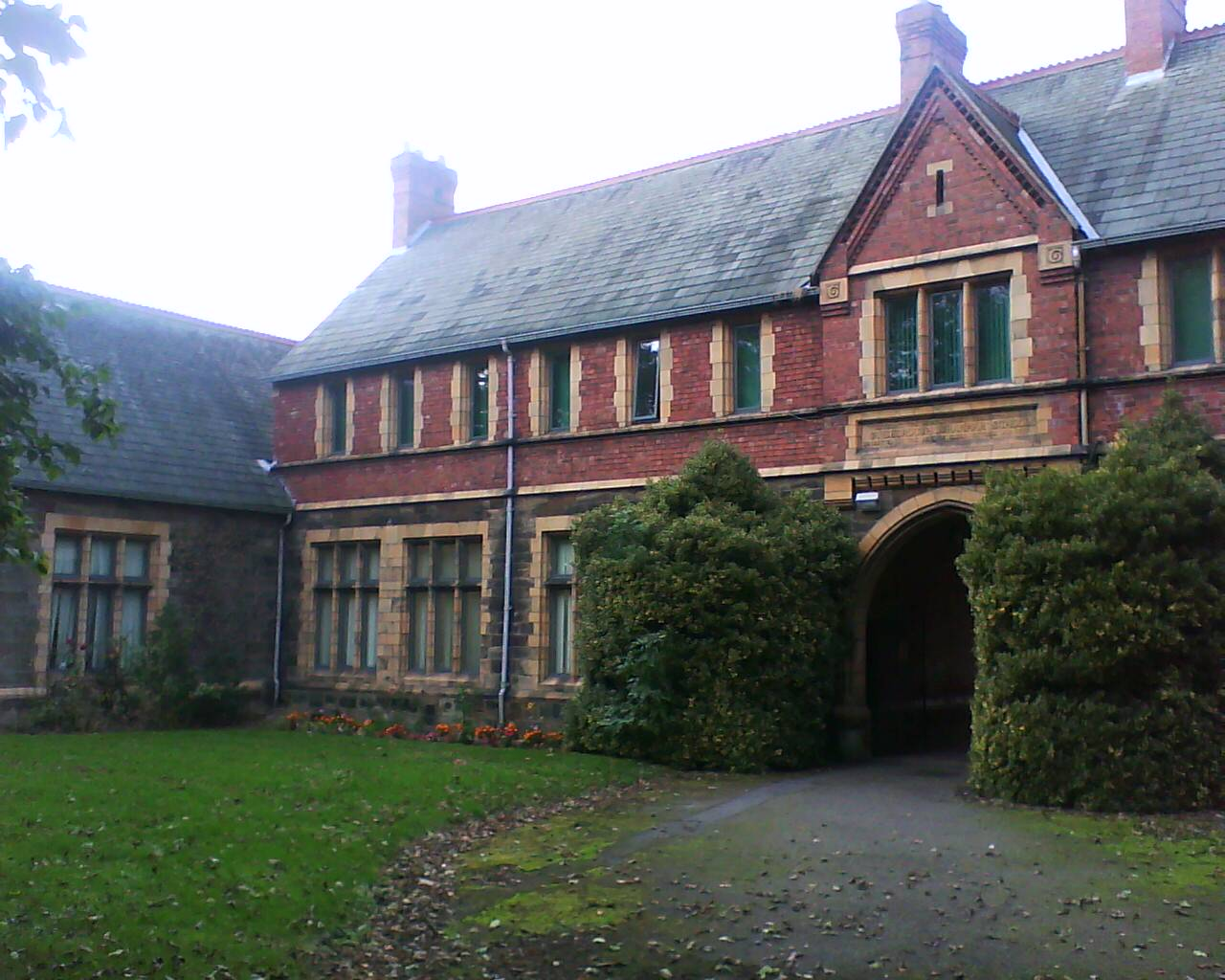
The Waterhouse Building, Prior Pursglove College

Primary education is provided at Belmont, Galley Hill, Highcliffe, St Paulinus (Roman Catholic) and Chaloner Primary which is an amalgamation of the previous Park Lane Infants & Northgate Junior School. Laurence Jackson School, situated at the eastern end of the town, is the only secondary school, and doubles as a Specialist Sports College.

Prior Pursglove College, a sixth-form college for GCSE, A level and AS level students, stands next to the parish church and priory ruins on the former site of Guisborough Grammar School, which it replaced after changes in the education system. It had been founded in 1561 by Robert Pursglove, the last Prior of Gisborough, as a charitable school for poor boys. It was accompanied by a set of almshouses for twelve pensioners.

Askham Bryan College of Agriculture operates a Guisborough Centre on the same site as Prior Pursglove College. It consists of an animal management centre and a modern building, the Priory Centre, which the two colleges share.

Former schools include the Guisborough Providence school, built by London Businessman George Venebles in 1792 and rebuilt in 1878 following the formation of a parish school board in 1873 along with the Guisborough Northgate School which was built the following year in 1879. The Guisborough Providence School operated on Providence Street (now Rectory Lane), until its closure in 1963. The building has since 1981 has been occupied by the Territorial Association Social Club. While the Guisborough Northgate School, located on Wilton Lane was closed in 2006 and then demolished in 2008, the site of which is now housing.

== Transport ==
=== Road ===
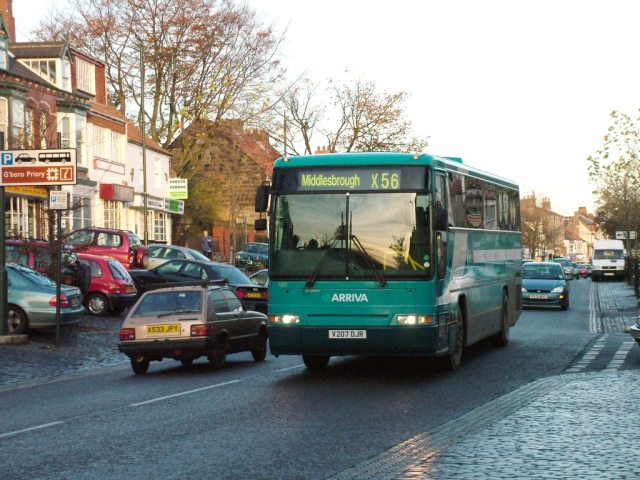
Arriva X56 Bus to Middlesbrough

Two main roads cross at Guisborough, the A171 leading west to Middlesbrough and east to Whitby, and the A173 south-west to Stokesley and north-east as far as Skelton, where it joins the A174 coast road. Before the bypass was built, the A171 ran along Westgate, the town's main street, crossing the A173 at Chapel Beck Bridge. Just beyond the bypass to the north-east, a B-road heads north from the A173 to Redcar. Another minor route out of town, Wilton Lane, is a winding, almost single-track road running north to the village of Wilton and on to the ICI Wilton chemical works. There are two other lanes that lead out of town into the hills. Hutton Lane ends at Hutton Village, built mostly for local mining, agricultural and estate workers. Belmangate is an ancient funeral route.

=== Paths ===
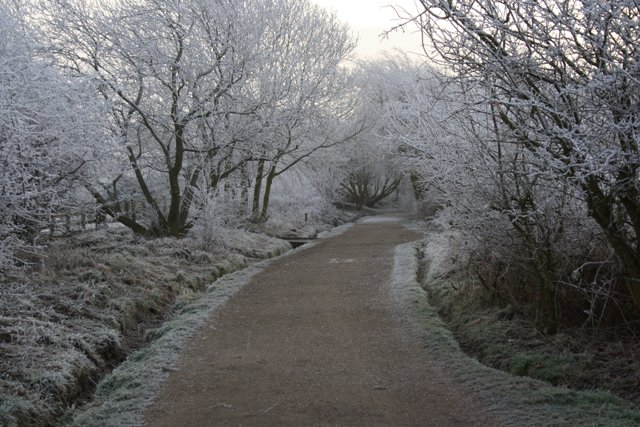
Guisborough Branch Walk, the former railway line

The south of the town is bounded by the North York Moors National Park. Guisborough Forest, which is Forestry England land, clothes the edge of the moors. Through the forest, the ground climbs sharply from the plain to the moors behind. There are several rocky outcrops on the steep slope, including Highcliff Nab and the Hanging Stone. The woods are crossed by several rights of way, including Cleveland Way, but other paths and commission tracks are also open to walkers. Beyond the woods, the ground levels out to form Gisborough Moor.

=== Railway station ===
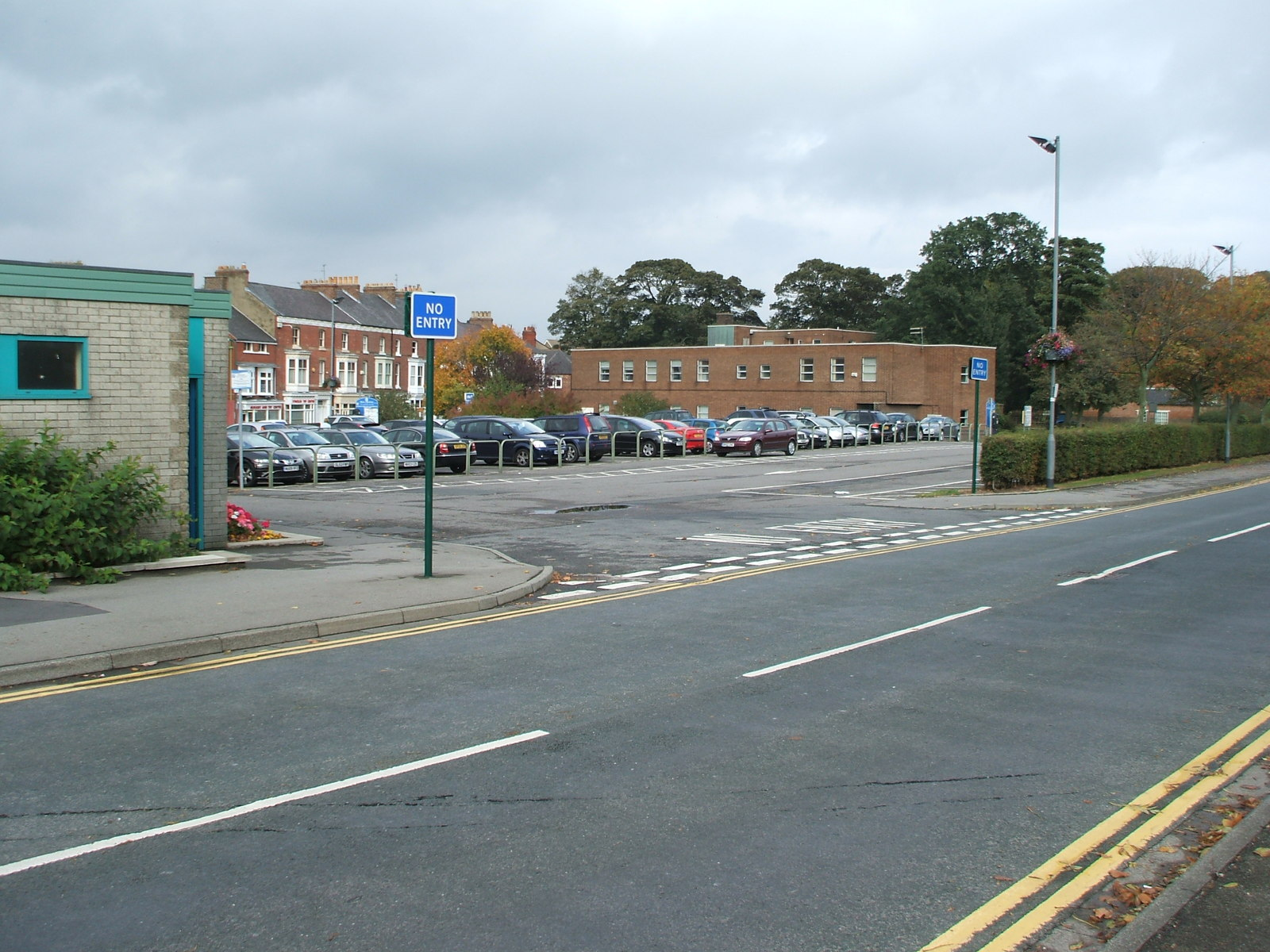
The site of the former station, now a car park

Until 1964, Guisborough was served by trains from Middlesbrough – the Middlesbrough & Guisborough Railway had its terminus at the now-demolished Guisborough station. Before 1958 it was possible to travel from Guisborough to Whitby and Scarborough, along the scenic North Yorkshire coast railway.

== Economy ==
Guisborough is a commuter town for nearby Middlesbrough and has many people working in the chemical plants around Teesside.

Guisborough market is held on Thursday and Saturday with a few stalls on Tuesday. Originally selling cattle and other livestock, the market developed into a general market for fruit and vegetables, clothing and flowers. It opens from early morning to late afternoon on the restored cobbles of Westgate, the main shopping street. Guisborough Museum, behind Westgate's Sunnyfield House, shows photographs of Guisborough's history and inhabitants.

One main employer in the town was The Shirt Factory. Towards the end of its existence it was acquired by Montague Burton of Leeds, but it closed in 1999. Other former employers were Blackett Hutton and Co., maker of medium high-integrity castings, and the civil engineering firm Henderson Campbell.

There is a fully restored, working, seventeenth-century watermill at Tocketts Mill, set within 38 acres of ancient woodland.

On 15 January 2004, Guisborough was granted Fairtrade Town status.

== Sport ==
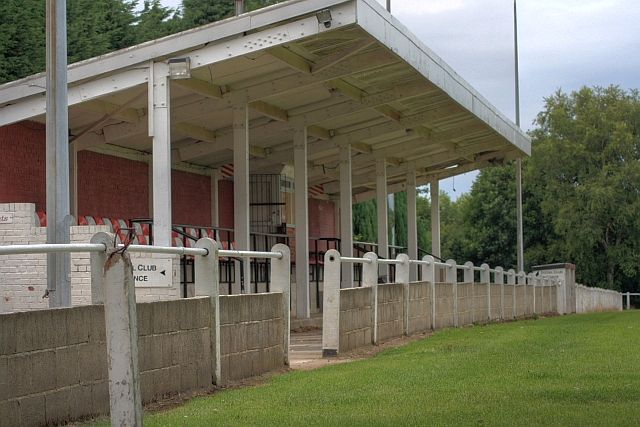
King George V Ground

Guisborough Town FC, founded in 1973, play in Northern Premier League Division One East as of the 2023-24 season. The King George V Ground, which hosts the club's home matches, is named after the king.

King George's Fields, adjacent to the football club, is a playing field with a small playground and a skate park. There is a swimming pool, built in 1968, at the fields. An eight-year campaign led by the late MP, Dr Ashok Kumar, secured the pool's refurbishment, which was completed in 2008–2009.

Guisborough Rugby Union Football club plays in Durham/Northumberland 2 division in the 2021–22 season. The area's constituent body is the Yorkshire Rugby Football Union, able to compete in the region's Silver Trophy.

Guisborough Cricket Club plays in the NYSD cricket league. In 2001–04 it equalled its record of four successive league wins. Past players have included the professionals Murray Goodwin (Sussex and Zimbabwe), Desmond Haynes and Phil Simmons (both West Indies), Imran Jan (Trinidad and Tobago), Sean Clingeleffer (Tasmania) and Greg Todd (Otago).

FIM Superbike World Championship team Shaun Muir Racing (competing under ROKiT BMW Motorrad WorldSBK Team) are based in Guisborough. The team has won the World Superbike Riders' Championship once and the British Superbike Championship twice.

== Media ==
Local news and television programmes are provided by BBC North East and Cumbria and ITV Tyne Tees. Television signals are received from the Bilsdale and the local relay TV transmitters.

Local radio stations are BBC Radio Tees, Capital North East, Smooth North East, Heart North East, and Zetland FM, a community based radio station which broadcast from its studio in Redcar.

The town is served by the local newspapers TeessideLive and The Northern Echo.

== Notable people ==
- Willie Applegarth (1890–1958), Olympic track and field athlete
- John Gilbert Baker (1836–1920), botanist
- Mark Benton (born 1965), character actor
- Robert de Brus, 1st Lord of Annandale (died before 1138), Norman baron and knight, founder of the Bruce dynasty of Scotland and England
- John Bulmer (1867–1917), first-class cricketer
- Bob Champion (born 1948), steeplechase jockey who won the 1981 Grand National, despite being recently diagnosed with cancer
- Henry Savile Clarke (1841–1893), dramatist and critic
- James Coppinger (born 1981), professional footballer with Doncaster Rovers
- Ralph Gaudie (1876–1951), professional footballer, notably with Arsenal
- Sean Gregan (born 1974), professional footballer
- Robert Holman (1952–2021), writer
- Lawry Lewin (born 1985), television actor
- Rod Liddle (born 1960), journalist, at school in Guisborough
- Katy Livingston (born 1984), Olympic modern pentathlete
- Richard Milward (born 1984), novelist
- Elinor Lyon (1921–2008), children's writer born in the town
- Alan Ramage (born 1957), cricketer
- Mark Robinson (born 1981), footballer with Guisborough Town
- Selina Scott (born 1951), head girl at Laurence Jackson School, later newsreader and presenter of The Clothes Show
- J. Denis Summers-Smith (born 1920), Scottish-born ornithologist and tribologist
- Walter of Guisborough (fl. 13th c.), medieval chronicler
- Thomas Ward (1652–1708), author who converted to Catholicism
- Joseph Whitehead (1814–1894), Canadian railway pioneer and political figure
- Will Muir, professional rugby union player
- Roger Evans, Baron Evans of Guisborough, politician and life peer.

== Climate ==
The area generally has warm summers and relatively mild winters. During the year, on average there is around 650mm of rainfall.

Climate data for Guisborough
Month	Jan	Feb	Mar	Apr	May	Jun	Jul	Aug	Sep	Oct	Nov	Dec	Year
Mean daily maximum °C (°F)	6 (43)	6 (43)	8 (46)	11 (52)	15 (59)	18 (64)	19 (66)	19 (66)	17 (63)	13 (55)	9 (48)	7 (45)	9 (48)
Mean daily minimum °C (°F)	0 (32)	0 (32)	2 (36)	3 (37)	6 (43)	9 (48)	11 (52)	11 (52)	9 (48)	6 (43)	3 (37)	1 (34)	0 (32)
Average precipitation mm (inches)	47 (1.9)	33 (1.3)	44 (1.7)	48 (1.9)	39 (1.5)	73 (2.9)	69 (2.7)	64 (2.5)	50 (2.0)	65 (2.6)	60 (2.4)	51 (2.0)	643 (25.3)
Source 1: Weather.com
Source 2: WorldWeatherOnline.com
