= Alan Ramage =

English cricketer (born 1957)

Alan Ramage (born 29 November 1957) is an English former first-class cricketer, who played for Yorkshire County Cricket Club, Northern Transvaal and the Minor Counties.

A right arm fast bowler, he took 44 wickets at 37.47 in first-class cricket, with a best of 5 for 65 and scored 219 runs, batting left-handed, at 16.84 with a top score of 52. He began his cricket as a batsman, and was picked to represent England Under 15s at the age of twelve, but developed his fast bowling as he matured. In thirty seven one day matches, he took 31 wickets at 39.90, and scored 184 runs at 18.40, with a highest score of 32 not out.

Ramage first played for Yorkshire, in the John Player League in 1975. He played seven one day games before making his first-class debut for his native county against Cambridge University in June 1979. He made sporadic appearances until his twenty third and final first-class match, against Nottinghamshire in July 1983. He bowled hostile spells, but never cemented a permanent place in a strong Yorkshire seam bowling attack, which also included Chris Old, Graham Stevenson and Arnie Sidebottom.

He played for Northern Transvaal against Natal in a one-day game in December 1982, having joined the Berea Park Club in Pretoria, South Africa, as their overseas professional, and for the Minor Counties in two Benson & Hedges Cup matches in 1984.

Ramage combined with cricket career with appearances for Middlesbrough F.C. between 1975 and 1980. He made his debut as an 18-year-old substitute at Villa Park under the management of Jack Charlton, and made a total of seventy seven appearances for the first team. He was transferred to Derby County in 1980.

He now runs a successful energy inspector business.
