= Duckhole =

Hamlet in Gloucestershire, England

Coordinates: 51.630°N 2.517°W

- Location within Gloucestershire
- OS grid reference: ST6421992532
- Unitary authority: South Gloucestershire
- Ceremonial county: Gloucestershire
- Region: South West
- Country: England
- Sovereign state: United Kingdom
- Post town: BRISTOL
- Postcode district: BS35
- Dialling code: 01454
- Police: Avon and Somerset
- Fire: Avon
- Ambulance: South Western
- UK Parliament: Thornbury and Yate

Duckhole is a hamlet in South Gloucestershire in the west of England. Historically it was located in the hundred of Lower Thornbury in the county of Gloucestershire and the name dates back at least as far as 1658, when it appeared in a parliamentary survey.

At the time of the 2011 United Kingdom census Duckhole consisted of just thirteen households with a total population of thirty-five. The hamlet lies in a rural setting a short distance to the west of Lower Morton, near the town of Thornbury and consists mainly of farmland and also a small number of cottages.
