= Dunveth =

Coordinates: 50.515°N 4.848°W

- Location within Cornwall
- OS grid reference: SW982722
- Civil parish: Wadebridge
- Unitary authority: Cornwall
- Ceremonial county: Cornwall
- Region: South West
- Country: England
- Sovereign state: United Kingdom
- Post town: Wadebridge
- Postcode district: PL27

Dunveth is a hamlet in the parish of Wadebridge, Cornwall, England, UK.
