= Dunn Street, Maidstone =

Hamlet in Kent, England

Coordinates: 51.3262°N 0.5701°E

Dunn Street
- Location within Kent
- OS grid reference: TQ792617
- Civil parish: Bredhurst
- District: Maidstone
- Shire county: Kent
- Region: South East
- Country: England
- Sovereign state: United Kingdom
- Post town: Gillingham
- Postcode district: ME7
- Police: Kent
- Fire: Kent
- Ambulance: South East Coast
- UK Parliament: Faversham and Mid Kent

Dunn Street is a hamlet near the village of Bredhurst and the M2 motorway, in Maidstone District, in the English county of Kent. It is south of the town of Gillingham.
