= John Dunstall =

English engraver and teacher

- Died: 1693
- Occupation: Engraver
- Years active: 1644–1675

John Dunstall (fl. 1644–1675; died 1693) was an English engraver and teacher.

== Life ==
He lived in Blackfriars, London, where he published drawing books on natural history and other educational subjects. (According to some accounts he lived in the Strand.)

He engraved portraits for frontispieces of books, including portraits of Charles I, Charles II, William III, Queen Mary II, Rev. John Carter (Minister of Bramford, 1644), James Ussher (1656), and Rev. Samuel Clarke (1675).

He also engraved views of Basing House, Clarendon House, London's Custom House, and St Marie Ouers in Southwark (Southwark Cathedral). His works are etched and sometimes finished with the burin in the style of Wenceslaus Hollar. A few of his works are drawings, including a view of the Bethlehem Hospital. The British Museum holds many of his works.
