= HMS Dunkirk =

Four ships of the Royal Navy have been named HMS Dunkirk, after the Channel seaport of Dunkirk, France:

- English ship Dunkirk (1656) was a 2-gun ketch captured from the French in 1656 and sold in 1660.
- HMS Dunkirk (1660) was a 48-gun fourth rate. She was launched in 1651 under the name Worcester, but she was renamed Dunkirk on the Restoration in 1660. She was rebuilt in 1704 and 1734, and was broken up in 1749.
- HMS Dunkirk (1754) was a 60-gun fourth rate launched in 1754. She was on harbour service from 1778 and was sold in 1782.
- HMS Dunkirk (D09) was a Battle-class destroyer launched in 1945 and broken up in 1965.

== See also ==
- HMS Dunkirk's Prize was a 24-gun sixth rate, previously the French privateer Le Hocquart. She was captured by HMS Dunkirk in 1705 and was wrecked in 1708.
- The French battleship Dunkerque was a French fast battleship of a similar name commissioned in 1937 and scuttled in 1942.
