= Dunslea =

Coordinates: 50.5172°N 4.43354°W

- Civil parish: Linkinhorne
- Unitary authority: Cornwall
- Ceremonial county: Cornwall
- Region: South West
- Country: England
- Sovereign state: United Kingdom

Dunslea (Dunsley on Ordnance Survey maps) is a hamlet in the parish of Linkinhorne, Cornwall, England.
