= Dungate =

Village in Kent, England

Coordinates: 51.3006°N 0.7484°E

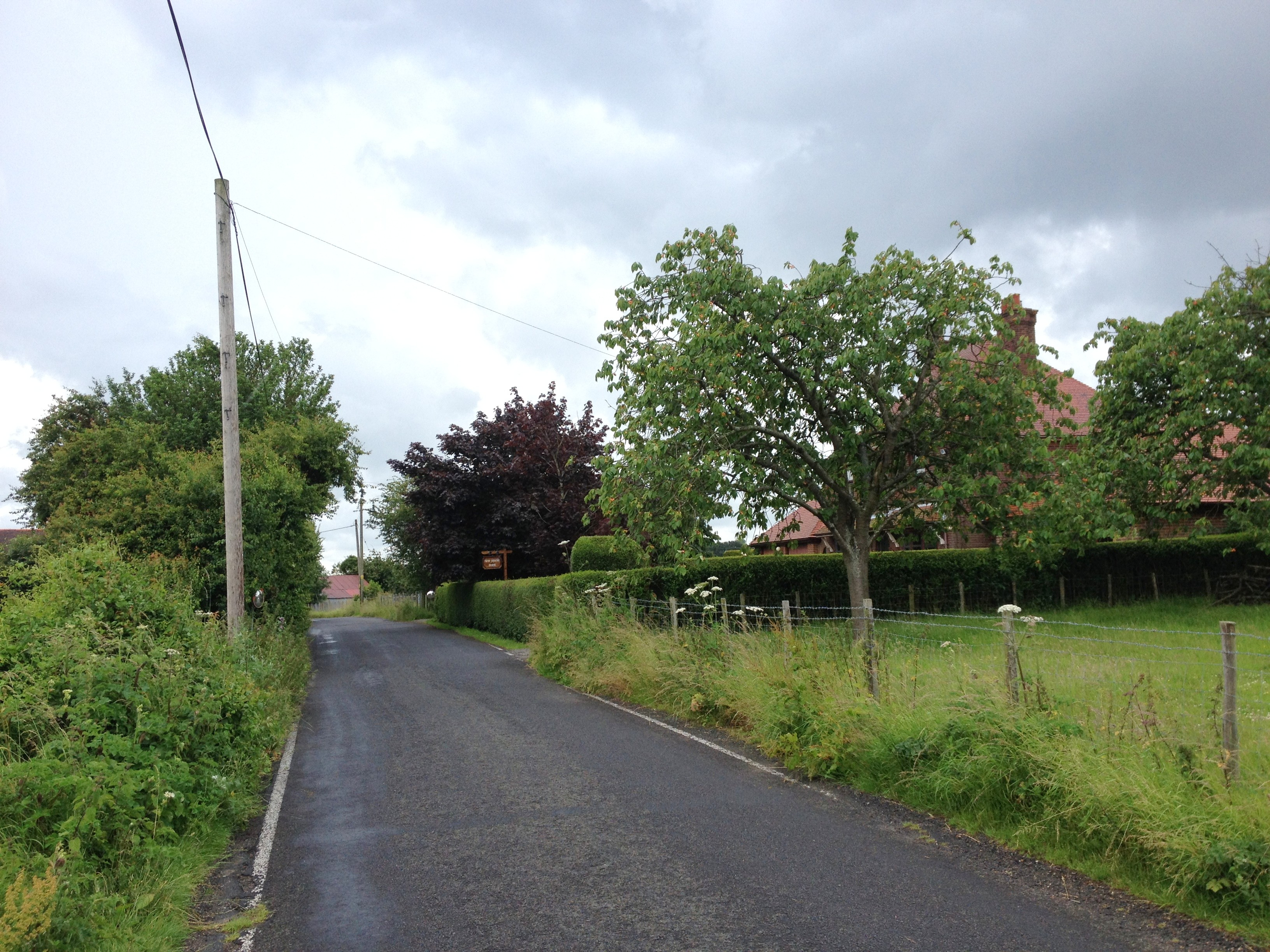
Slough Road, Dungate

Dungate is a village near the M2 motorway, in the Swale district, in the English county of Kent. It is south of the town of Sittingbourne, and on the boundary between Rodmersham and Lynsted with Kingsdown civil parishes.
