= Durley Street =

Village in Hampshire, England

Coordinates: 50.9569°N 1.2496°W

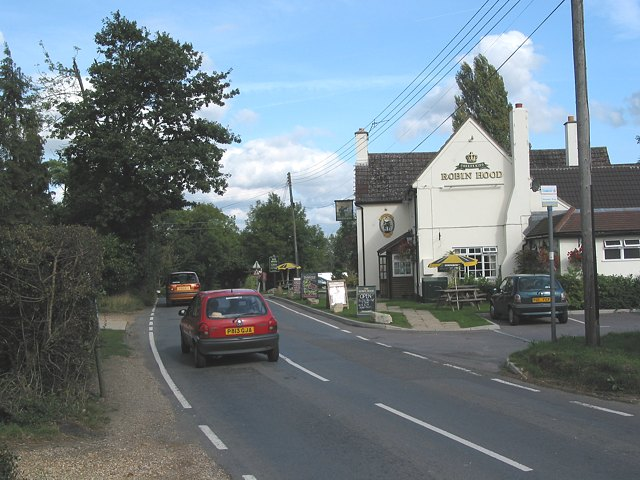
- Durley Street

- Location within Hampshire
- Civil parish: Durley
- District: Winchester
- Shire county: Hampshire
- Region: South East
- Country: England
- Sovereign state: United Kingdom
- Post town: SOUTHAMPTON
- Postcode district: SO24
- Dialling code: 01962
- Police: Hampshire and Isle of Wight
- Fire: Hampshire and Isle of Wight
- Ambulance: South Central
- UK Parliament: Winchester

Durley Street is a village in the City of Winchester district of Hampshire, England. It is located approximately 7 miles (11 km) northeast of Southampton.

== Governance ==
The village is part of the civil parish of Durley and is part of the Owslebury and Curdridge ward of the City of Winchester non-metropolitan district of Hampshire County Council.
