= Duncanston =

Coordinates: 57.581°N 4.360°W

- Location within the Ross and Cromarty area
- OS grid reference: NH589569
- Council area: Highland
- Country: Scotland
- Sovereign state: United Kingdom
- Post town: Dingwall
- Postcode district: IV7 8
- Police: Scotland
- Fire: Scottish
- Ambulance: Scottish

Duncanston is a scattered crofting and rural village, lying 3 miles east of Conon Bridge, on the Black Isle in Inverness, within the Scottish Highlands and the Scottish council area of Highland.
