= Gisborough Hall =

19th-century mansion house, now hotel, in northern England, UK

Coordinates: 54.538°N 1.036°W

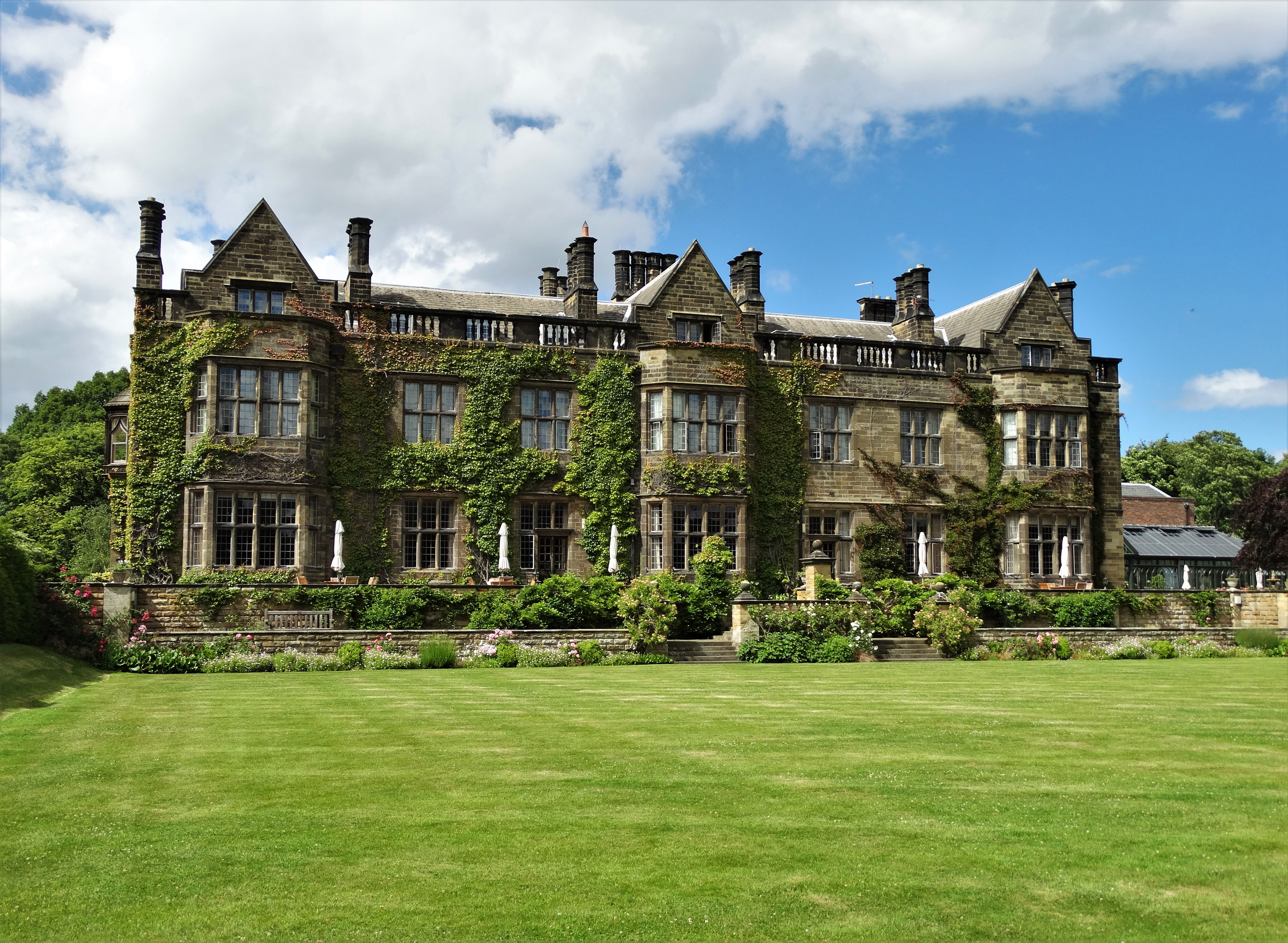
Gisborough Hall

Gisborough Hall is a 19th-century mansion house, now a hotel, at Guisborough, in the borough of Redcar and Cleveland, England, in the United Kingdom. It is a Grade II listed building.

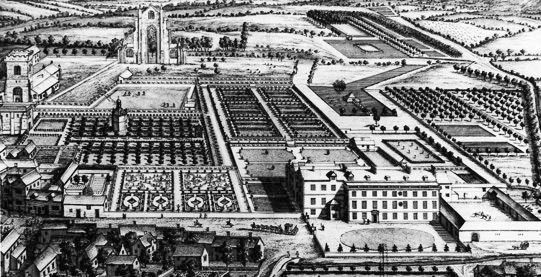
Remains of Gisborough Priory 1709

The manor of Gisborough and the site of the dissolved Priory of Gisborough were acquired after the Dissolution of the Monasteries by Sir Thomas Chaloner in about 1558. He built a new manor house adjacent to the Priory ruins. His grandson was Sir William Chaloner, Bt.

The manor house was demolished in the early 19th century when the family moved to Long Hull. In 1842 Admiral Thomas Chaloner inherited the estate and in 1856 created the present mansion house. The design of the hall is attributed to William Milford Teulon by Historic England, though his elder brother, Samuel Sanders Teulon is listed as the architect by the 1966 North Yorkshire edition of the Pevsner Architectural Guides.

The house, in Jacobean style, presents a main south front of two stories and attics behind balustrades, with seven bays, the central and two end bays being canted and gabled.

On his death without issue, the Admiral left the estate to his great-nephew Richard Godolphin Walmesley Long (younger brother of Viscount Long) who in 1888 changed his surname to Chaloner. He was created Baron Gisborough in 1917 and died at the Hall in 1938.

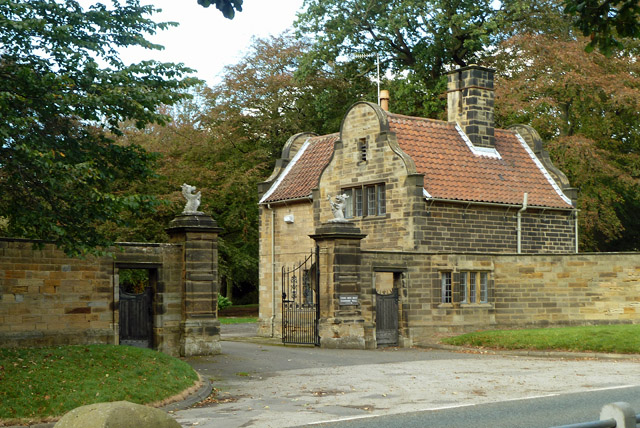
Former South Lodge

The family lived in the Hall until the Second World War when it was requisitioned by the Army. After the war, it was leased to North Riding Council as a nursing home. In 1972 it became a non-residential banqueting house and restaurant.

In 2002, it was refurbished and extended by the family and now operates as a privately owned four-star Country House Hotel and wedding and conference venue with 71 bedrooms, the award-winning Chaloner's restaurant, De Brus Bar & Grill.

The hall is Grade II listed on the National Heritage List for England as is the former stable block and its adjoining screen wall and gate piers to the west of the hall. The North and South lodges of the hall are also Grade II listed, as are the entrance gates and boundary walls to the south of the south lodge.
