= Dyffryn-bern =

Village in Ceredigion, Wales

Coordinates: 52°07′53″N 4°30′13″W

- Location within Ceredigion
- OS grid reference: SN 2873 5108
  - Cardiff: 72.4 mi (116.5 km)
  - London: 191.8 mi (308.7 km)
- Community: Penbryn
- Principal area: Ceredigion
- Country: Wales
- Sovereign state: United Kingdom
- Post town: Cardigan
- Postcode district: SA43
- Police: Dyfed-Powys
- Fire: Mid and West Wales
- Ambulance: Welsh
- UK Parliament: Ceredigion Preseli
- Senedd Cymru – Welsh Parliament: Ceredigion

Dyffryn-bern is a small village in the community of Penbryn, Ceredigion, Wales, which is 72.4 miles (116.5 km) from Cardiff and 191.8 miles (308.6 km) from London. Dyffryn-bern is represented in the Senedd by Elin Jones (Plaid Cymru) and is part of the Ceredigion Preseli constituency in the House of Commons. The names, originally, was from a farm of the same name, but is now used for the surrounding hamlet.

== See also ==
- List of localities in Wales by population
