= Dunstall Common =

Village in Worcestershire, England

Coordinates: 52.084411°N 2.171173°W

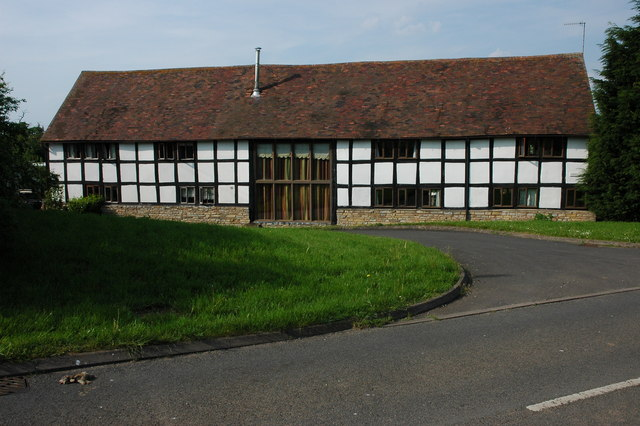
- Dunstall Barn

- Location within Worcestershire
- District: Malvern Hills
- Shire county: Worcestershire
- Region: West Midlands
- Country: England
- Sovereign state: United Kingdom
- Police: West Mercia
- Fire: Hereford and Worcester
- Ambulance: West Midlands

Dunstall Common is a village in Worcestershire, England.
