= Dunsdale =

Village in North Yorkshire, England

Coordinates: 54.562°N 1.061°W

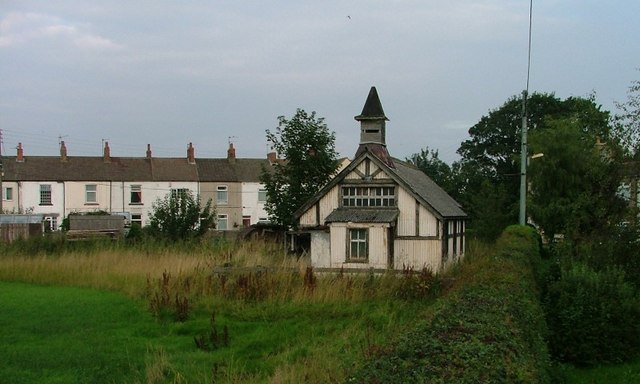
Disused timber-built, tin-roofed chapel in Dunsdale

Dunsdale is a village in the borough of Redcar and Cleveland within the civil parish of Guisborough.

== History ==
The Newcomen family, from nearby Kirkleatham, opened an ironstone mine in Dunsdale, in 1872. It exploited two pockets of ironstone left by glaciation. The two rows of cottages forming the village of Dunsdale were part of the mine property and form the major part of the village as it is today. Traces of the drift and buildings remain with parts of the railbed in the Dunsdale area leading to the top of the incline. Unfortunately, the mine was not a particular success and was abandoned on 31 December 1886, but the village still remains.
