= White Rose Walk =

Footpath in North Yorkshire, England

The White Rose Walk, also known as the White Rose Challenge Walk, is a 35-mile (56 km) trail located in North Yorkshire, England. which was devised in 1968 by the Yorkshire Wayfarers. It starts at the Kilburn White Horse (National Grid Ref SE 514 813) and is completed by touching the trig point on top of Roseberry Topping (NZ 579 126). The walk, whilst recognised by the Long Distance Walkers Association (LDWA) as a long distance walk in itself, merges and crosses with several other long distance paths including the Cleveland Way, the Coast to Coast Walk, and the Lyke Wake Walk. The route takes in the highest peaks in the area such as Live Moor, Carlton Moor, Sutton Bank, Cold Moor, the Wainstones and Urra Moor. The walk also passes Captain Cooks Monument on Easby Moor.

The walk takes in not only stunning scenery with grand views of the Vale of York but also takes the walker through Yorkshire's history, passing by Bronze Age ancient burial mounds, the site of 18th century horse racing and Hambleton Drove Road where cattle were taken to market in Yorkshire, Derbyshire and Lincolnshire by Scottish and Northumbrian drovers.

Walkers who complete the walk within a 24-hour period can claim a woven badge and a small certificate.

== Route ==
- White Horse Kilburn - 515813
- View Point Sutton Bank - 514828
- Sneck Yate Bank - 508875
- High Paradise Farm - 504887
- Whitestones - 491931
- Minor Road - 479959
- Picnic area near Moor - 470993
- Carlton Bank - 522030
- Picnic Area Hasty Bank - 572035
- Incline top - Railway - 611025
- T - Junction Kildale - 605092
- Captain Cook Monument - 590101
- Roseberry Topping - 579126
- END T - Junction at Newton - 571128
