= Cleveland Way =

Long-distance footpath in England

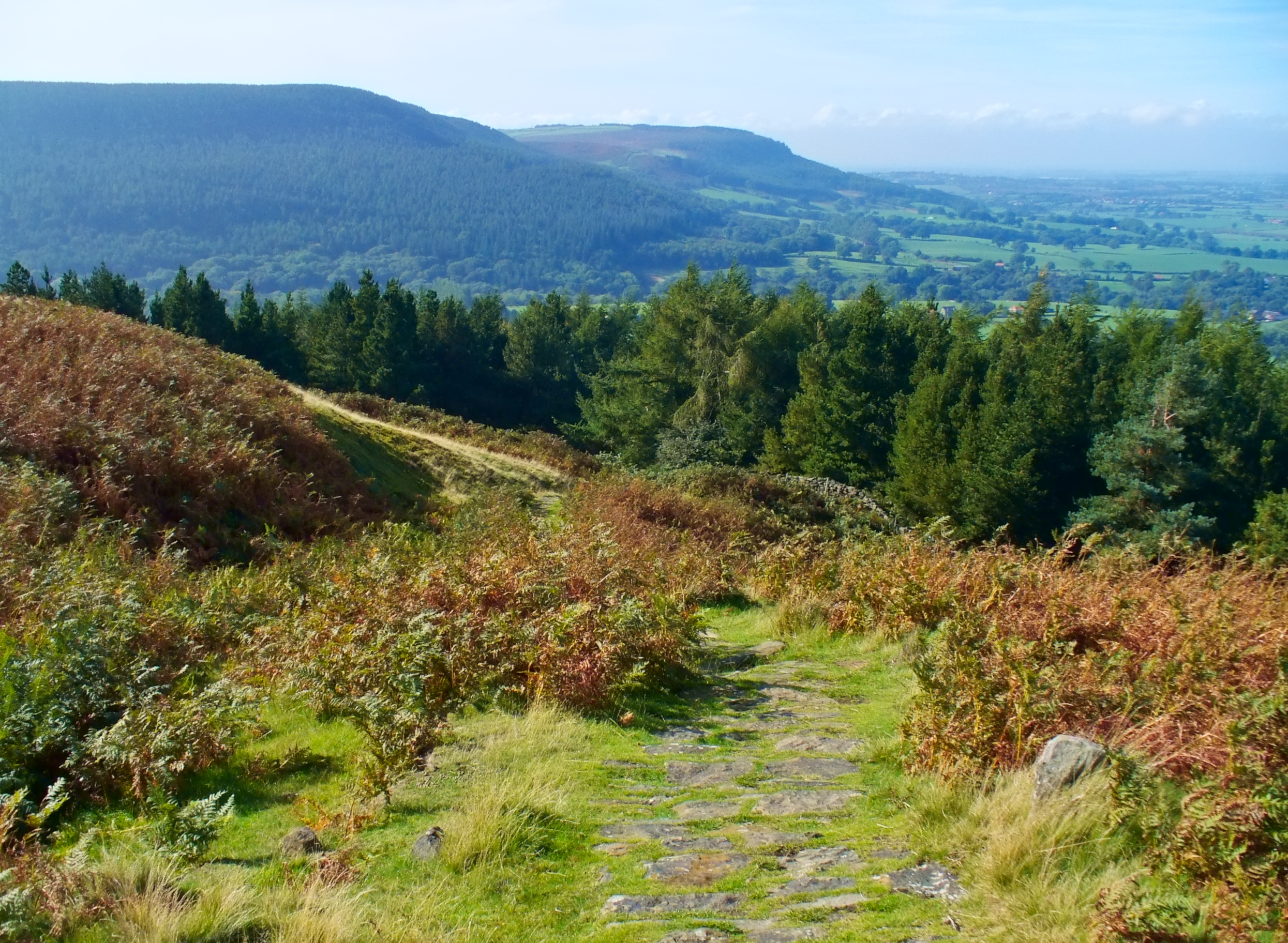
- Live Moor: the waymarked path crosses remote upland moors
- Length: 110 mi (180 km)
- Location: North Yorkshire, England
- Established: 1969
- Designation: National Trail
- Trailheads: Helmsley; Filey
- Use: Hiking
- Elevation gain/loss: 16,506 ft (5,031 m)
- Highest point: Urra Moor, 1,489 ft (454 m)
- Website: www.nationaltrail.co.uk/en_GB/trails/cleveland-way/
Trail map

The Cleveland Way is a National Trail in the historic area of Cleveland in North Yorkshire, Northern England. It runs 110 miles (177 km) between Helmsley and the Brigg at Filey, through the west, north and east of the North York Moors National Park.

== History ==
Development of the Cleveland Way began in the 1930s when the Teesside Ramblers' Association pressed for the creation of a long-distance path in the north-east of Yorkshire linking the Hambleton Drove Road, the Cleveland escarpment and footpaths on the Yorkshire coast. Subsequently, in 1953, a formal proposal to create the route was submitted to the North Riding of Yorkshire Council by the National Parks Commission. The trail was officially opened in 1969. It was the second official National Trail to be opened.

== Route ==
=== Route description ===
The trail can be walked in either direction between the trailheads of Helmsley (60 m (200 ft) above sea level) and Filey (on the coast), although most people walk the route from Helmsley to Filey. The trail is waymarked in both directions along its length using the standard National Trail acorn symbol. The trail has a horseshoe shaped configuration, following the west, north and east sides of the North York Moors, and falls into two roughly equal parts, one inland and one following the coast.

The inland part first leads west from Helmsley past Rievaulx Abbey and Cold Kirby to the Kilburn White Horse and Sutton Bank. It then turns north along the Hambleton Hills to Osmotherley and the Lady Chapel. It then heads east across the Cleveland Hills to Carlton Bank, the B1257 road at Clay Bank, its highest point at Urra Moor (454 m (1,490 ft)) and the disused Rosedale Railway at Bloworth Crossing. Here the route heads north again to Kildale and Roseberry Topping (320 m (1,050 ft)). From here it runs north-east, passing to the south of Guisborough, crossing the A171 road at Slapewath and reaching the coast at Saltburn.

From Saltburn the path follows the coast for the rest of the way, mostly running along the tops of the sea cliffs that characterise this coast. The path makes its way through the seaside settlements of Skinningrove, Staithes, Runswick Bay and Sandsend to the town of Whitby. Here it drops down from the West Cliff, passes through the town centre, crosses the harbour by the swing bridge, and climbs the steps to Whitby Abbey. It then follows the cliff tops again through the villages of Robin Hood's Bay and Ravenscar to the town of Scarborough. Here it follows the coastal promenade through the town, passing under Scarborough Castle and around the harbour. It then follows the coast to Filey, where it ends near Filey Brigg.

The trail is within the North York Moors National Park, apart from a section from Slapewath to just before Staithes, the section through Whitby, and the final section from just before Scarborough to Filey.

=== Access points ===
The path is accessible at a number of points, including the following:

Location	From Helmsley	Notes
Helmsley	-	A market town on the south western edge of the moors. Accessible by car or by regular bus service.
Rievaulx Abbey	2.8 miles (4.5 km)	A former Cistercian abbey in an isolated valley in the Hambleton Hills to the west of Helmsley. Accessible by car.
Sutton Bank	10.2 miles (16.4 km)	A hill on the Hambleton Hills with extensive views over the Vale of York and the Vale of Mowbray, with a National Park visitor centre. The Kilburn White Horse is nearby. Accessible by car.
Osmotherley	21.6 miles (34.8 km)	A village on the western edge of the moor. The Shrine of Our Lady of Mount Grace and ruined Mount Grace Priory are nearby. Accessible by car or by regular bus service.
Carlton Bank	28.8 miles (46.3 km)	A hill in the Cleveland Hills with extensive views of Teesside including Middlesbrough and Redcar, as well as the surrounding moorland. Accessible by car.
B1257 at Clay Bank	32.7 miles (52.6 km)	A road crossing, close to Urra Moor. Accessible by car.
Kildale	41.9 miles (67.4 km)	A small village on the northern flank of the moor. Accessible by train (Kildale station) and car, but with very limited parking
Slapewath	51.5 miles (82.9 km)	A hamlet where the path crosses the A171 road. Accessible by car and by regular bus service, at a stop named Charltons Fox and Hounds.
Saltburn	56.6 miles (91.1 km)	A seaside resort town, with Victorian era buildings, cliff lift and pier. Accessible by rail (Saltburn station), car and regular bus service.
Skinningrove	60.5 miles (97.4 km)	A village and former centre of ironstone mining and iron smelting. Accessible by car and by regular bus service
Staithes	65.4 miles (105.3 km)	A fishing village and tourist destination. Accessible by car and by regular bus service
Runswick Bay	68.7 miles (110.6 km)	A bay and cliffside village. Accessible by car and by regular bus service.
Sandsend	73.8 miles (118.8 km)	A small fishing village at the northern end of Whitby's extensive beach. Accessible by car and by regular bus service.
Whitby	76.9 miles (123.8 km)	A seaside town, port and tourist centre. Known for the prominent Whitby Abbey and connection with Dracula. Accessible by rail (Whitby station), car and by regular bus service.
Robin Hood's Bay	83.8 miles (134.9 km)	A village and tourist destination. The upper part of the village is accessible by car and by regular bus service, but the lower village and bay are only accessible on foot.
Ravenscar	87.2 miles (140.3 km)	A headland, with a hotel and the remains of a failed Victorian era resort town development. Accessible by car.
Scarborough	98.0 miles (157.7 km)	A large seaside town. Accessible by rail (Scarborough station), car and regular bus service.
Filey	110 miles (177 km)	A seaside town. Accessible by rail (Filey station), car and regular bus service.

== Flora and fauna ==
The moorland sections of the trail provide a habitat for species including red grouse, curlews and emperor moth caterpillars. The coastal sections may provide sightings of seabirds such as great cormorants, shags, Atlantic puffins, common guillemots and herring gulls.

== Related and connecting trails ==
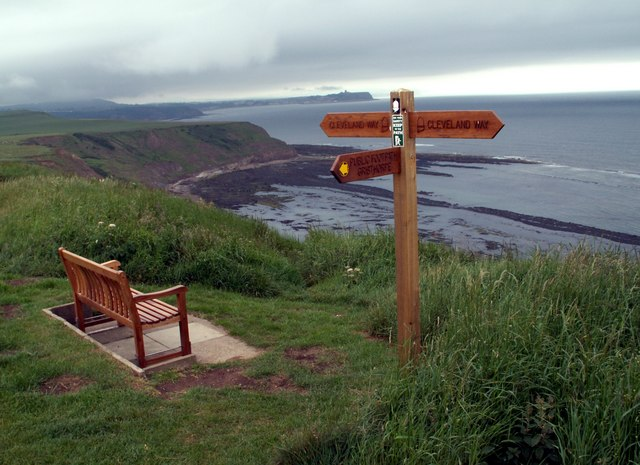
Gristhorpe

The whole coastal part of the Cleveland Way forms part of both the England Coast Path, which aspires to follow the entire coast of England, and the North Sea Trail, which follows the coast of the North Sea from the north of Scotland to the north of Norway. The inland section of the Cleveland Way, between Osmotherly and Bloworth Crossing, also forms part of the route of the Coast to Coast Walk, which meets the Cleveland Way again at Robin Hoods Bay.

The Tabular Hills Walk links Helmsley, at the western end of the Cleveland Way, to Scarborough, near the eastern end. It passes along the southern edge of the North York Moors National Park, enabling walkers to walk the complete perimeter of the park. Similarly the challenging Lyke Wake Walk takes a west to east route across the centre of the moors from Osmotherly, on the western section of the Cleveland Way, to Ravenscar, on the coastal section. The White Rose Walk takes a south to north route from Kilburn White Horse to Roseberry Topping, both also on the Cleveland Way, which it parallels and crosses at several points.

The Cinder Track (left) and Cleveland Way (right) diverge just north of Ravenscar

On the coastal section between Whitby and Scarborough, the Cleveland Way is paralleled by the Cinder Track, a multi-use walking and cycling trail. The Cinder Track uses a former railway alignment, and as a result adopts a flatter and more inland route than the largely cliff-top Cleveland Way, but the two trails do connect at Robin Hood's Bay and Ravenscar.

The Cleveland Way also connects with various other long-distance footpaths:

- The Ebor Way, from Ilkley (where it connects with the Dales Way) via York to Helmsley
- The Esk Valley Walk, from Castleton to Whitby
- The White Rose Way, from Leeds to Scarborough.
- The Yorkshire Wolds Way, from Filey to Hessle, near Hull, where it connects with the Trans Pennine Trail

== Races ==
The Hardmoors Race Series features ultramarathons, marathons and shorter races based on the Cleveland Way route. Included in the ultramarathon series are a 110 mi (180 km) race circumnavigating the entire length of the Cleveland Way, and a 55 mi (89 km) and 60 mi (97 km) race which race between Helmsley and Guisborough, and Guisborough and Filey respectively in differing directions. There are also longer routes which link up to other trails including the Yorkshire Wolds Way.

== Circular walks ==
Official circular walks along the Cleveland Way include:

- Ravenscar Round
- Great Ayton Try a Trail
- Osmotherley and the Drovers Road

== Gallery ==
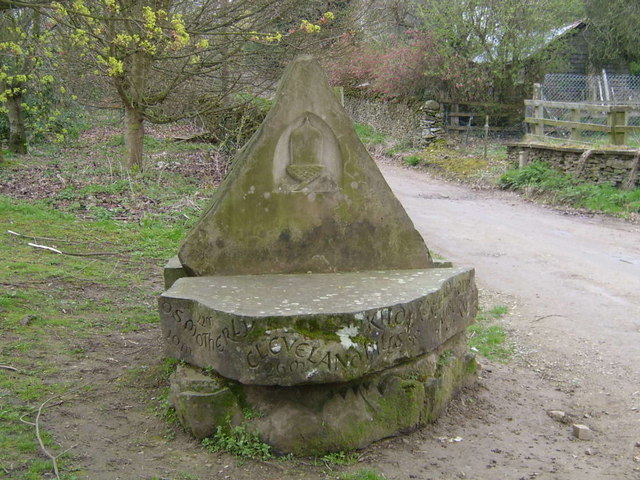
The start in Helmsley

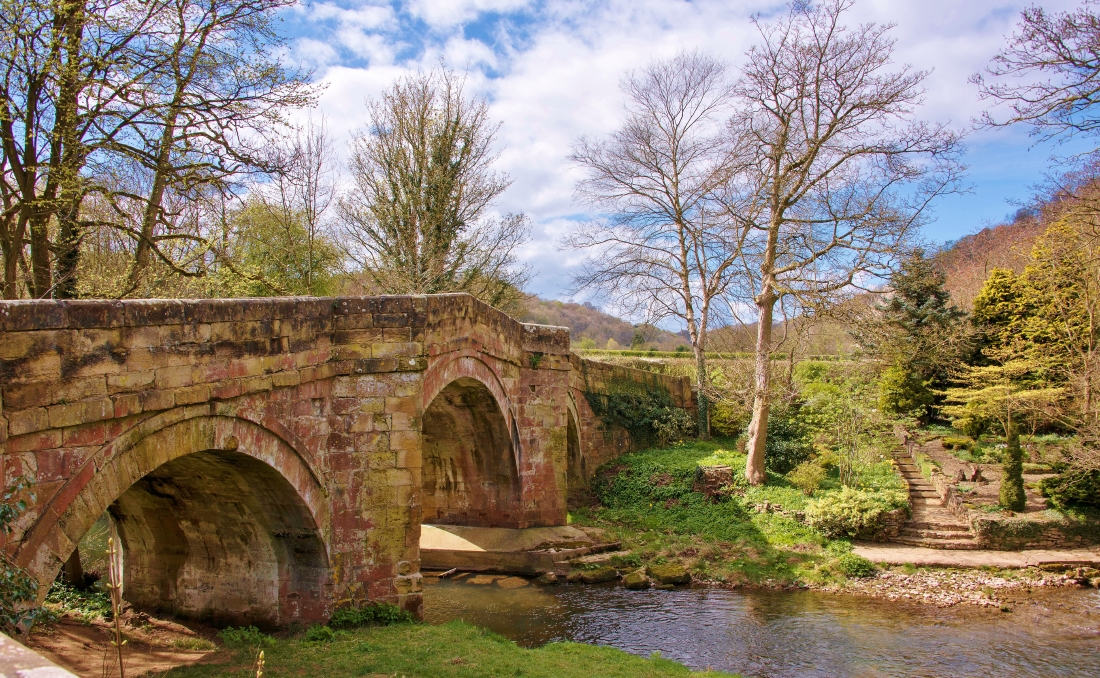
Rievaulx Bridge

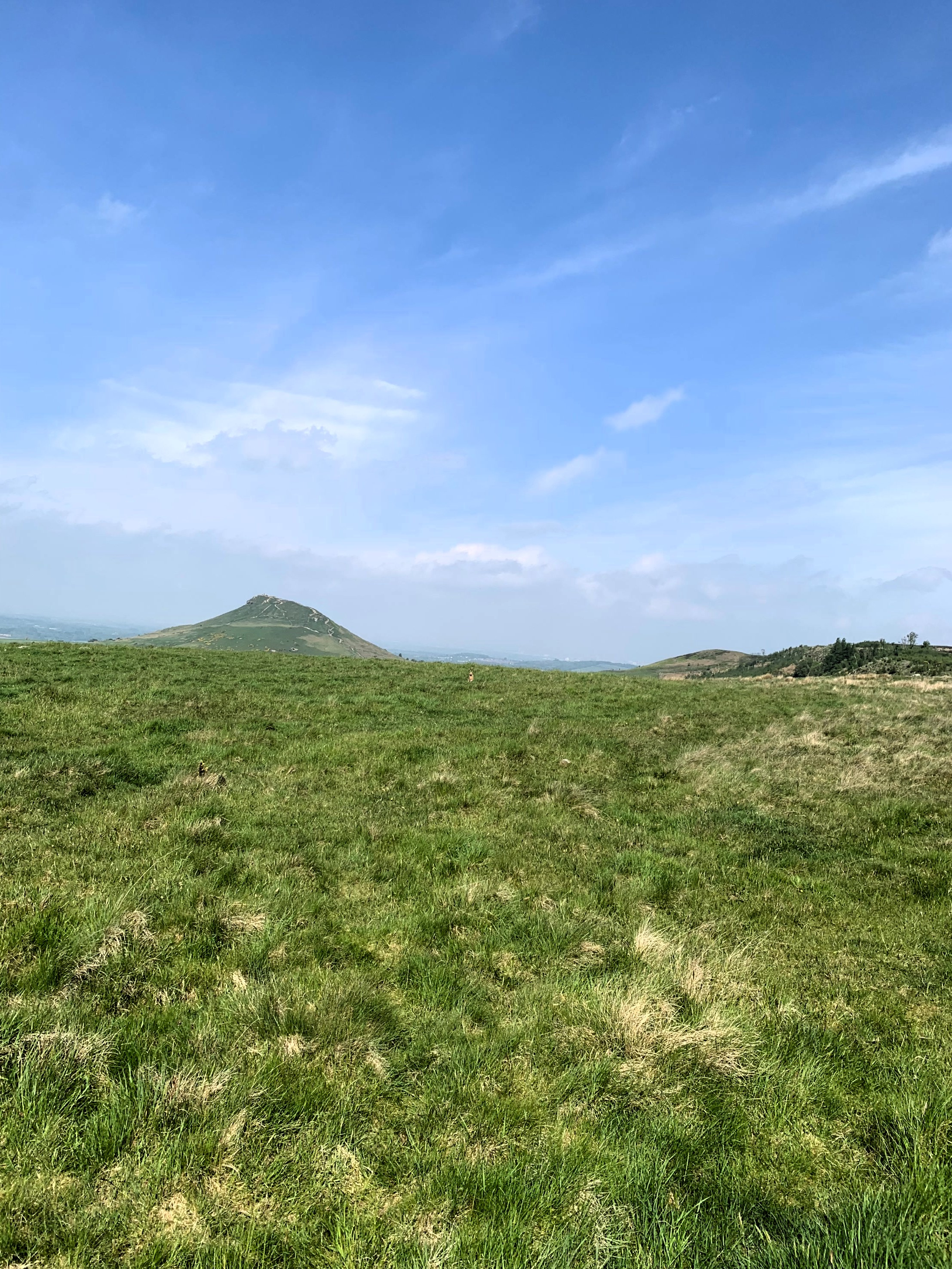
Roseberry Topping

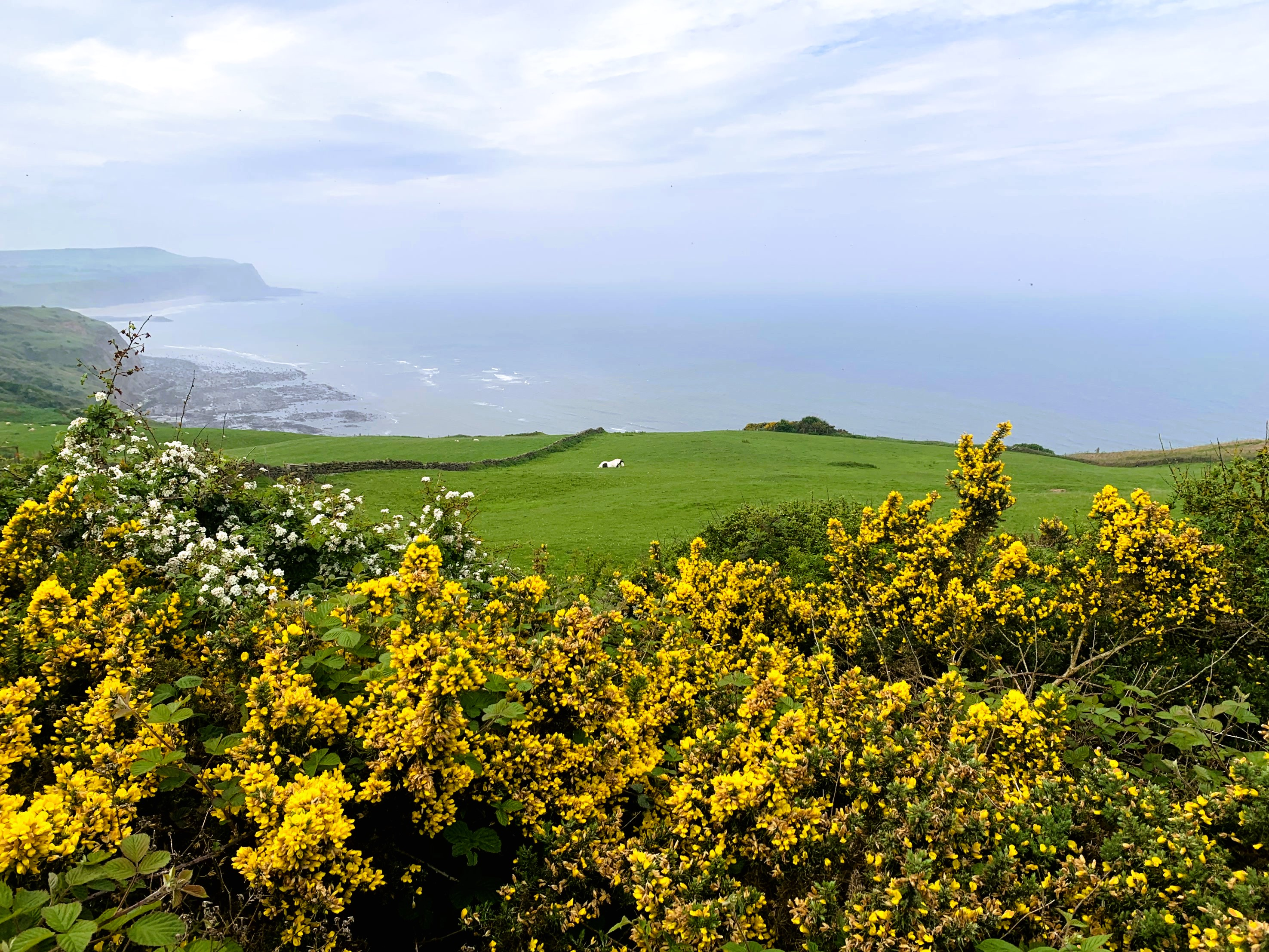
Hummersea Cliff

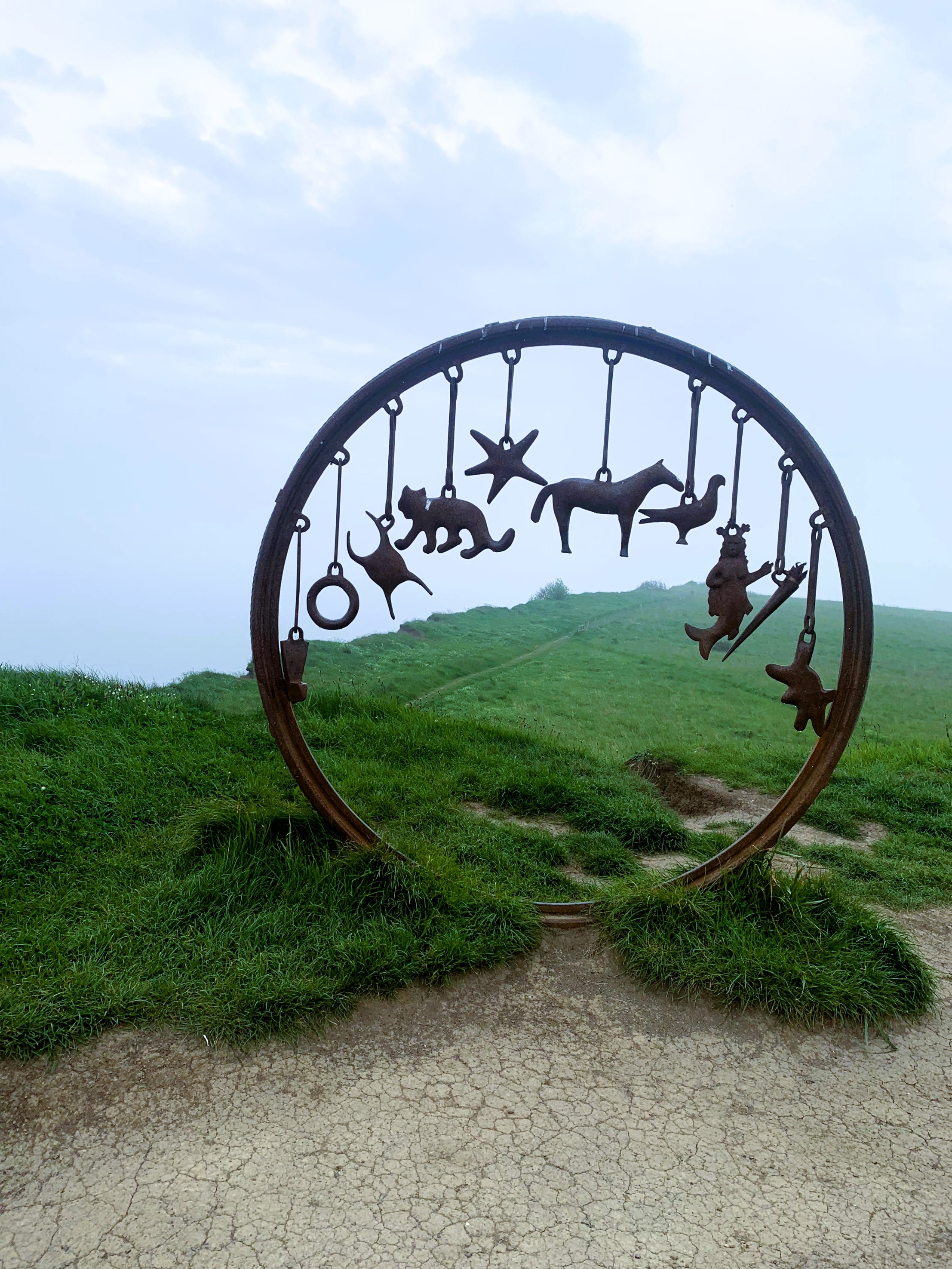
Richard Farrington's Charmed Bracelet

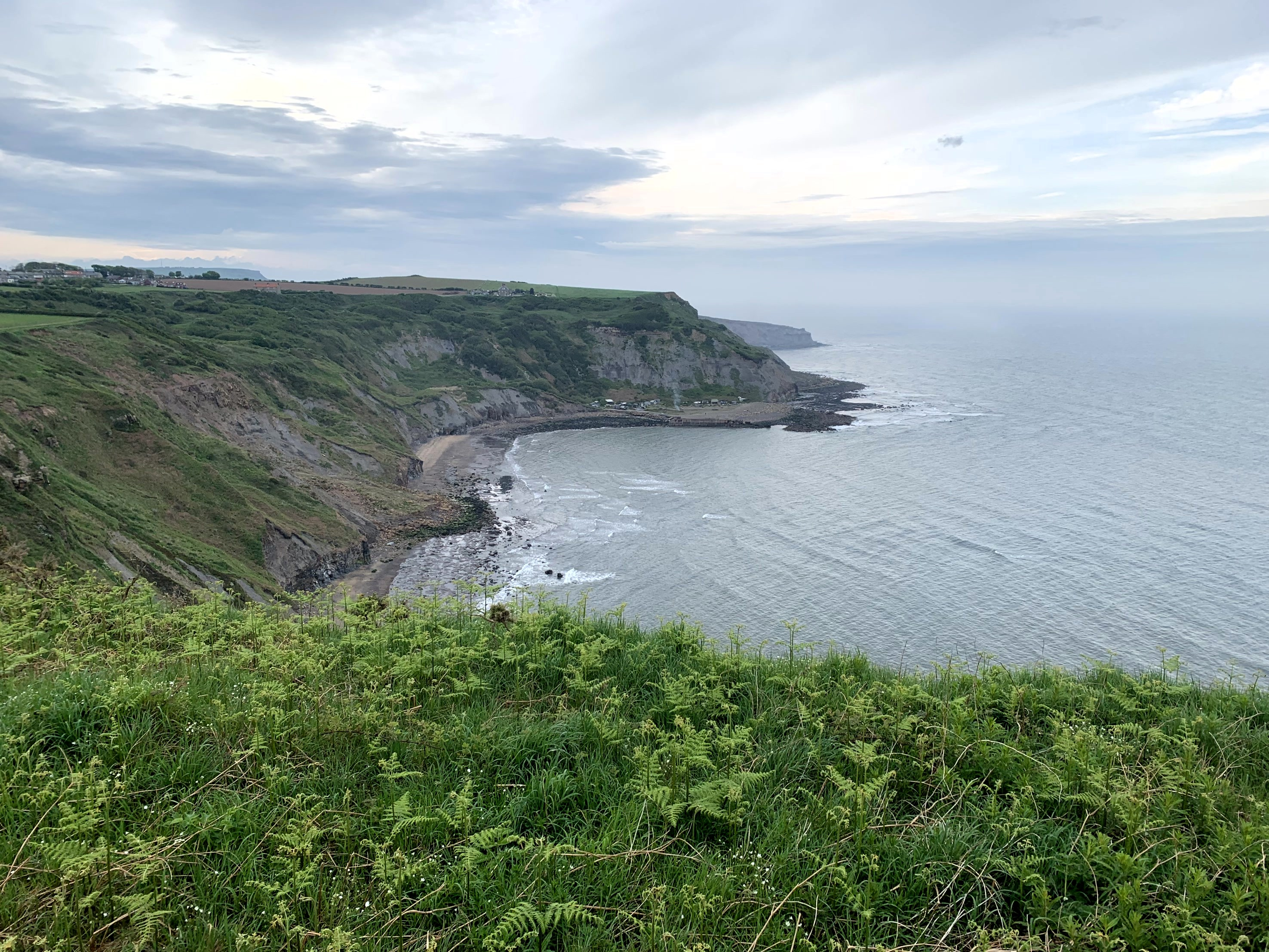
Mine Ruins at Port Mulgrave

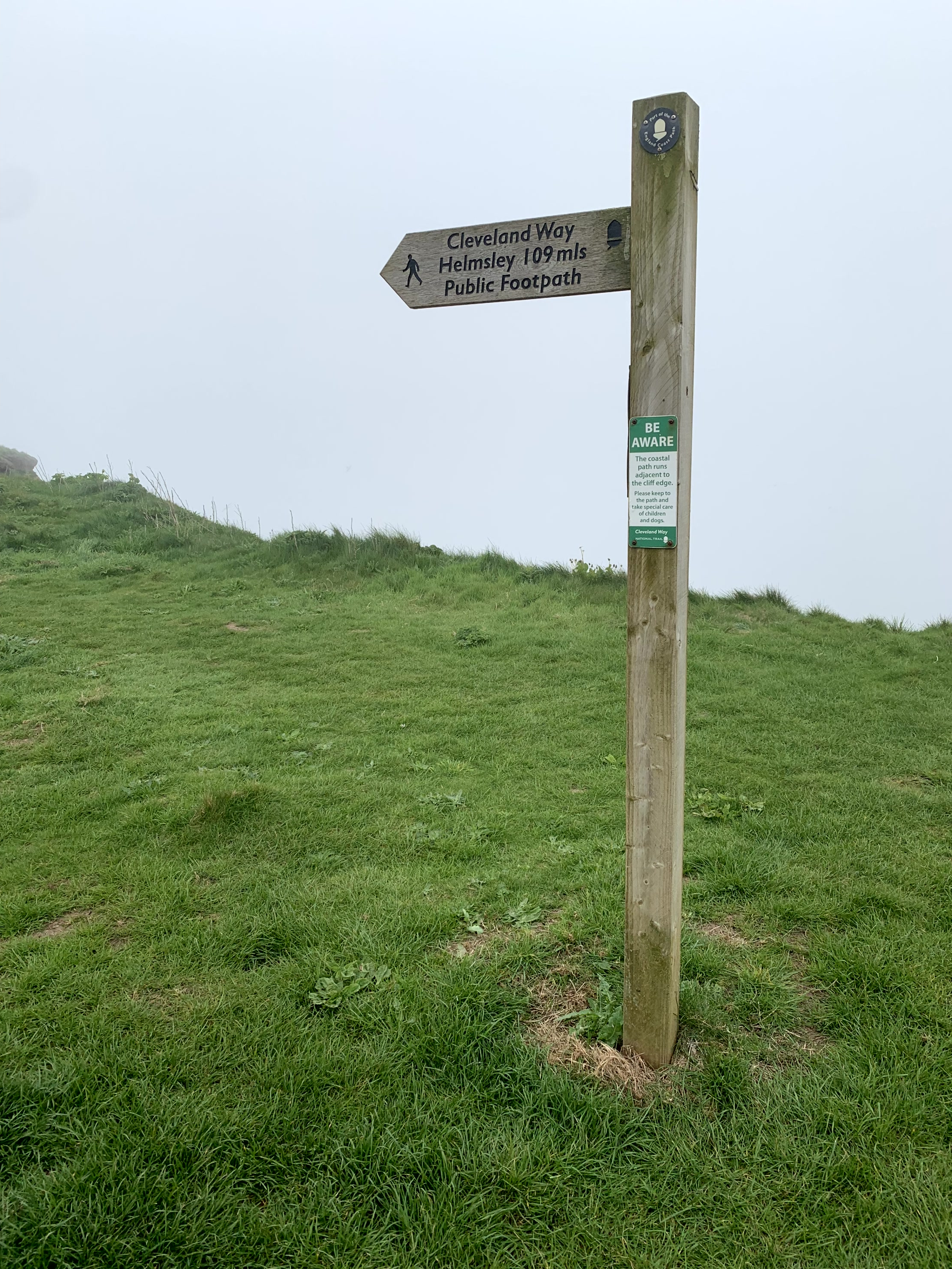
The end in Filey
