= Hambleton Hills =

Range of hills in North Yorkshire, England

Coordinates: 54.238°N 1.215°W

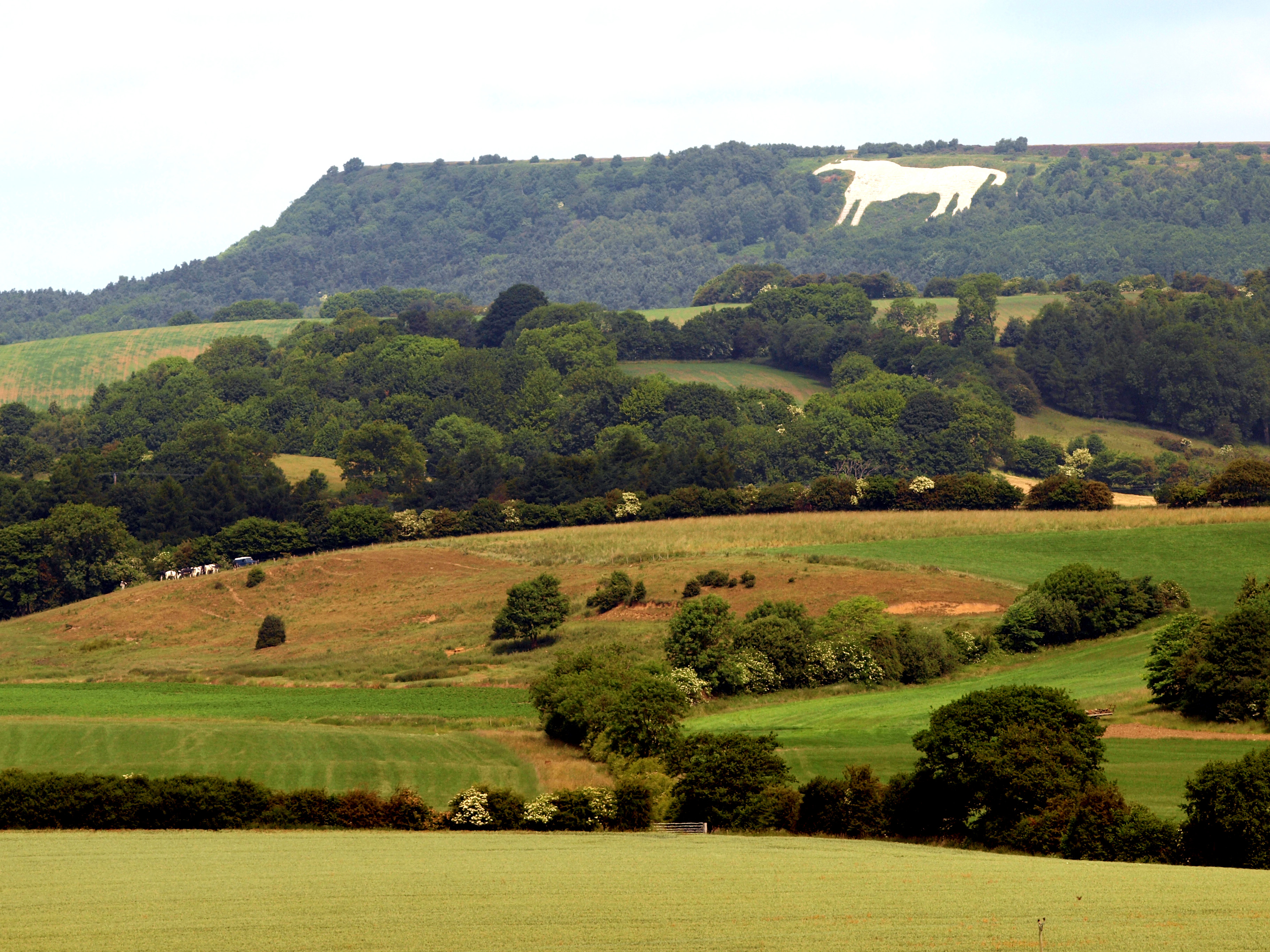
The Hambleton Hills and Kilburn White Horse from near Coxwold, North Yorkshire

The Hambleton Hills are a range of hills in North Yorkshire, England. They form the western edge of the North York Moors but are separated from the moors by the valley of the River Rye. They are the eastern boundary of the low-lying Vale of Mowbray which they abut with a precipitous escarpment.

They run in a north–south direction for about 15 miles (24 km) and merge with the Cleveland Hills in the north and Howardian Hills in the south. The entire range is within the North York Moors National Park.

The hills are made up of rocks of middle and late Jurassic age with the hard Corallian Limestone forming the cap at the highest points. The highest point is Black Hambleton which rises to 1,308 feet (399 m) at the northern end of the range. Roulston Scar reaches 919 feet (280 m) and Whitestone cliff is 1,063 feet (324 m). The Corallian Limestone also outcrops along the southern edge of the North York Moors forming the Tabular Hills which run from Black Hambleton eastwards to Scarborough, although much broken through by river valleys.

In the 12th and 13th centuries, the Hambleton Hills was the production centre for York Glazed Ware, a type of Medieval ceramic.

== Points of interest ==
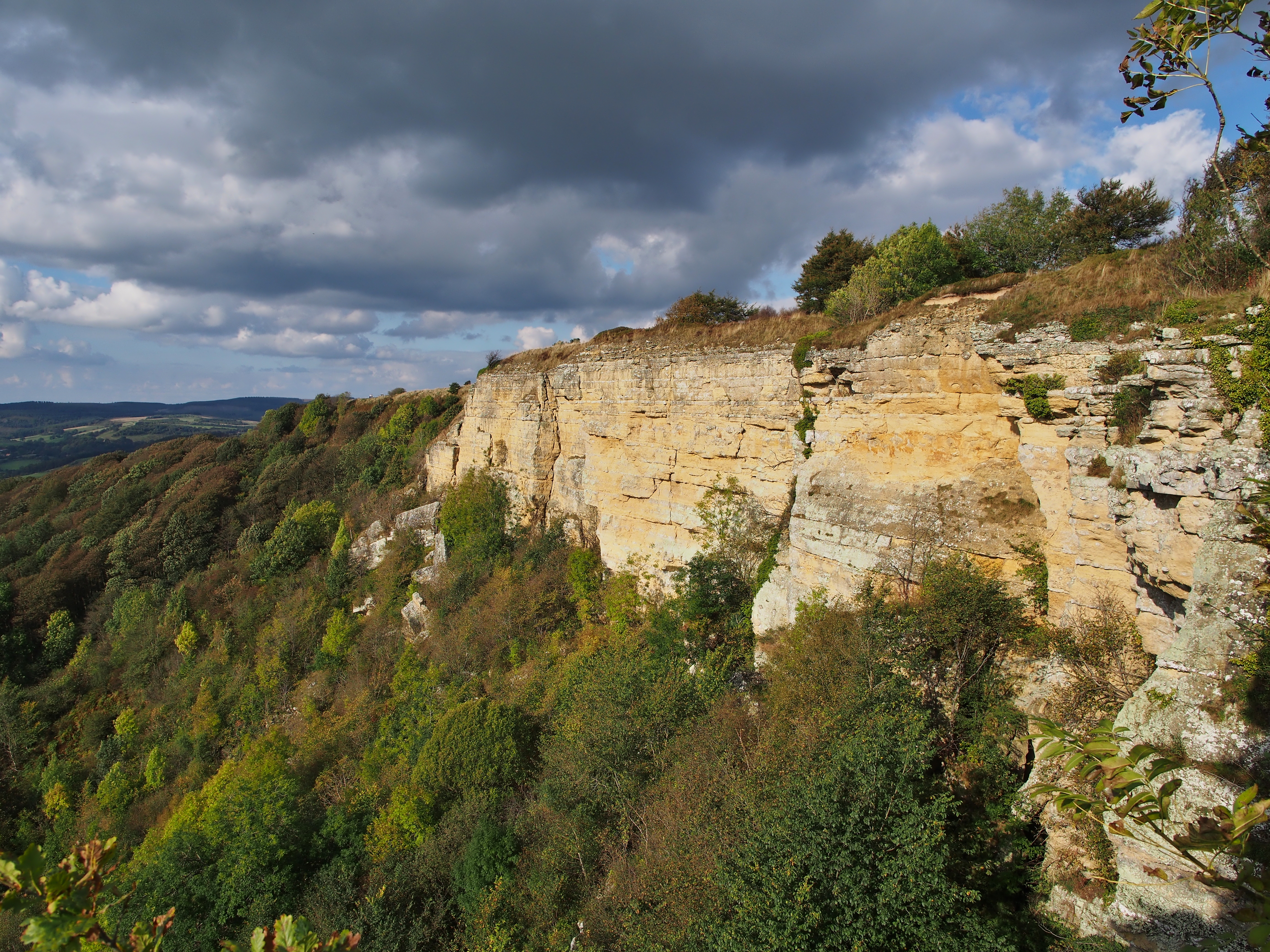
Whitestone Cliff near Sutton Bank, western slope of the Hambleton Hills

Sutton Bank (aka Roulston Scar) is a high point on the Hambleton Hills with extensive views over the Vale of York and the Vale of Mowbray. The hill is the site of one of the most important prehistoric monuments in the region, an Iron Age hill fort built in around 400 BC.

The Hambleton Drove Road runs along the summit of the hills, it is part of an ancient highway running from Scotland to the south of England. It is thought to be prehistoric and various burial grounds from the Neolithic and Bronze Ages are evident along its route. Large-scale movement of cattle from Scotland to market in England during the 18th and 19th centuries have given it the name by which it is known today.

The Pass of Byland was seized in 1322, by the invading army of Scotland's Sir James Douglas "the Good", Lord of Douglas, in the Battle of Old Byland which ended in the defeat of the English king Edward II's army.

In 1857 a Giant white horse hill figure was carved in the limestone above the village of Kilburn by the village schoolmaster John Hodgson.

The Cleveland Way long distance footpath follows the hills from the Kilburn White Horse north to Osmotherley.

== Literary references ==
On 4 October 1802 the poet William Wordsworth composed the poem entitled Composed After a Journey Across the Hambleton Hills, Yorkshire.

The vet Alf Wight whose pen name was James Herriot, famed for the All Creatures Great and Small series of books, TV programmes and films, lived and worked in the nearby market town of Thirsk, and many of his stories take place in the Hambleton Hills.

== Hambleton Royal Gold Cup ==
A horse race was run at Black Hambleton from at least the time of Queen Anne. Known as the Hambleton Royal Gold Cup, it was open to all horses 5 years or younger and was raced for over 4 miles (6.4 km), each horse carrying 10 stone (140 lb; 64 kg). The first race was won by the stallion Syphax, owned by Sir William Strickland. The race was traditionally held on the Saturday preceding the August York race meeting. The race was run until 1776 at Black Hambleton, thereafter alternately at Black Hambleton and the Knavesmire in York, and eventually, by the mid-19th century exclusively at York. The training of racehorses continued at stables at Hambleton House and the nearby hamlet of Hambleton.
