= Hambleton (Sutton Bank) =

Hamlet in North Yorkshire, England

Coordinates: 54.24073°N 1.19827°W

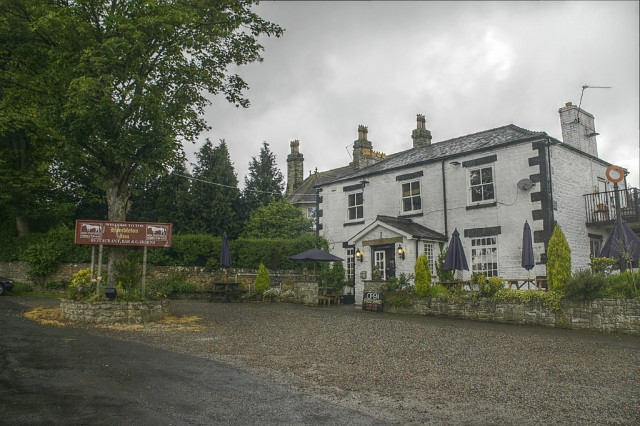
The Hambleton Inn

Hambleton is a hamlet on the A170 road between the towns of Thirsk and Pickering in the English county of North Yorkshire. It lies on the Hambleton Hills and is 1 mile (1.6 km) east of Sutton Bank.

The 1856 Ordnance Survey map shows the Hambleton Hotel (later the Hambleton Inn) at the location, but no hamlet. By 1893 the wider settlement had appeared. The location was historically associated with horse racing. Horse racing here is recorded from the early 17th century, although in 1775 races were transferred to the Knavesmire in York. Training has continued at Hambleton, associated with nearby Hambleton House. The Hambleton Inn closed in 2015.

The northern part of hamlet is in the civil parish of Cold Kirby, whilst the southern part, including the Hambleton Inn, is in the civil parish of Kilburn High and Low. Until 2023, the Cold Kirby part of the hamlet was administered by the former Ryedale District, whilst the Kilburn part was in the former Hambleton District. Since 2023, both parts have been within the North Yorkshire unitary authority area.
