= Cleveland Hills =

Range of hills in North Yorkshire, England

The Cleveland Hills
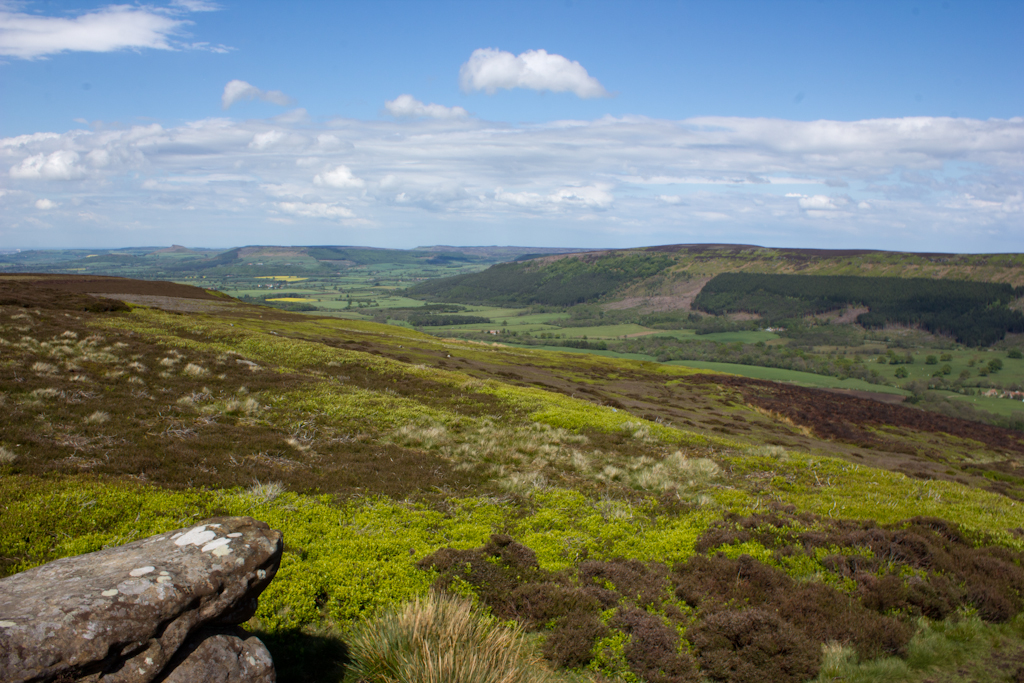
- The Cleveland Hills viewed from Urra Moor

- Location within the United Kingdom Location within North Yorkshire
- Location: North Yorkshire, England
- Nearest city: Middlesbrough, England
- Coordinates: 54°24′57.84″N 1°12′4.53″W
- Governing body: North York Moors National Park Authority
- Website: northyorkmoors.org.uk

The Cleveland Hills are a range of hills on the north-west edge of the North York Moors in North Yorkshire, England, overlooking Cleveland and Teesside. They lie entirely within the boundaries of the North York Moors National Park. Part of the 110-mile (177 km) long Cleveland Way National Trail runs along the hills, and they are also crossed by a section of Wainwright's Coast to Coast Walk. The hills, which rise abruptly from the flat Tees Valley to the north, include distinctive landmarks such as the cone-shaped peak of Roseberry Topping, near the village of Great Ayton – childhood home of Captain James Cook.

== Geology ==
The hills are formed by multiple stacked layers of Jurassic age sedimentary rocks. The scarp rises above the low ground to the north and west formed by the mudstones of the Redcar Mudstone Formation, though largely buried beneath glacial till from the last ice age. The same formation also provides the lowermost slopes of the scarp. The full sequence, presented in stratigraphic order, i.e. youngest/uppermost at the top, is:

- Ravenscar Group (Middle Jurassic)
  - Scalby Formation (including the Long Nab and Moor Grit 'members')
  - Scarborough Formation
  - Cloughton Formation
  - Eller Beck Formation
  - Saltwick Formation
  - Dogger Formation
- Lias Group (early/lower Jurassic)
  - Whitby Mudstone Formation (including the Mulgrave Shale Member)
  - Cleveland Ironstone Formation
  - Staithes Sandstone Formation
  - Redcar Mudstone Formation

Most of these formations are various combinations of sandstone, mudstone and siltstone though a couple also contain limestones and the Cleveland Ironstone and Eller Beck formations include ironstone, the former having been exploited for the ironworking industry in former times. The plateau surface is largely formed by the sandstones of the Saltwick and Cloughton formations whilst the summit of Roseberry Topping is an outlier of the Saltwick Formation separated from the main Cleveland Hills range by erosion.

The Cleveland Dyke cuts through the hills forming the Langbaurgh Ridge and Cliff Ridge, just south of Roseberry Topping, where Cliff Rigg Quarry has exploited this Palaeogene age basaltic andesite intrusion for use as roadstone.

Glaciofluvial deposits are scattered around the margins of the hills, notably in Kildale whilst peat has accumulated on the plateau surface in some areas. Landslips are common in the Lias Group rocks along the scarp face in the west and in Raisdale to the south.

== History ==
=== Early man ===
There are a number of tumuli and stone circles scattered throughout the Cleveland Hills and North York Moors, dating back to the Bronze Age, as well as many cairns that are of varied ages, some of which are relatively modern. Hundreds of flint arrowheads have been discovered during excavations in the hills and dated to the Mesolithic and Neolithic periods, indication of an active population in prehistoric times across the region.

==== Stone circles in the Cleveland Hills ====
- Commondale
- Tripsdale "Bride Stones"
- Thimbleby "Nine Stones"

=== Mining and industry ===
In 1850 ironstone was discovered by John Marley of Bolckow and Vaughan in the Eston Hills, outliers of the Cleveland Hills, leading to mining on a large scale and the rapid growth of nearby Middlesbrough. By the 1870s industry would be producing steel in vast amounts, and mining for coal, alum, jet, cement stone concretions, shale and potash from the hills, as well as employing sandstone and limestone quarries to gather raw materials. Many of the mines and quarries are still evident today.

== Hill data ==
The following heights are some of the highest or most notable in the range.

Name	Grid reference	Height	
Urra Moor (Round Hill)	NZ594015	454 m	1,490 ft
Cringle Moor	NZ537029	432 m	1,417 ft
Carlton Bank	NZ519026	408 m	1,339 ft
Cold Moor	NZ551035	402 m	1,319 ft
Hasty Bank	NZ565036	398 m	1,306 ft
Tidy Brown Hill	NZ603052	396 m	1,299 ft
Bilsdale West Moor	SE553966	395 m	1,296 ft
Warren Moor	NZ616075	335 m	1,099 ft
Gisborough Moor	NZ643123	328 m	1,076 ft
Easby Moor	NZ590101	324 m	1,063 ft
Park Nab	NZ614084	324 m	1,063 ft
Roseberry Topping	NZ579126	320 m	1,050 ft
Live Moor	NZ505013	315 m	1,033 ft
Highcliff Nab	NZ610138	310 m	1,017 ft
Codhill Heights	NZ614127	296 m	971 ft
Eston Nab	NZ561800	242 m	794 ft

== Towns and villages in the Cleveland Hills ==
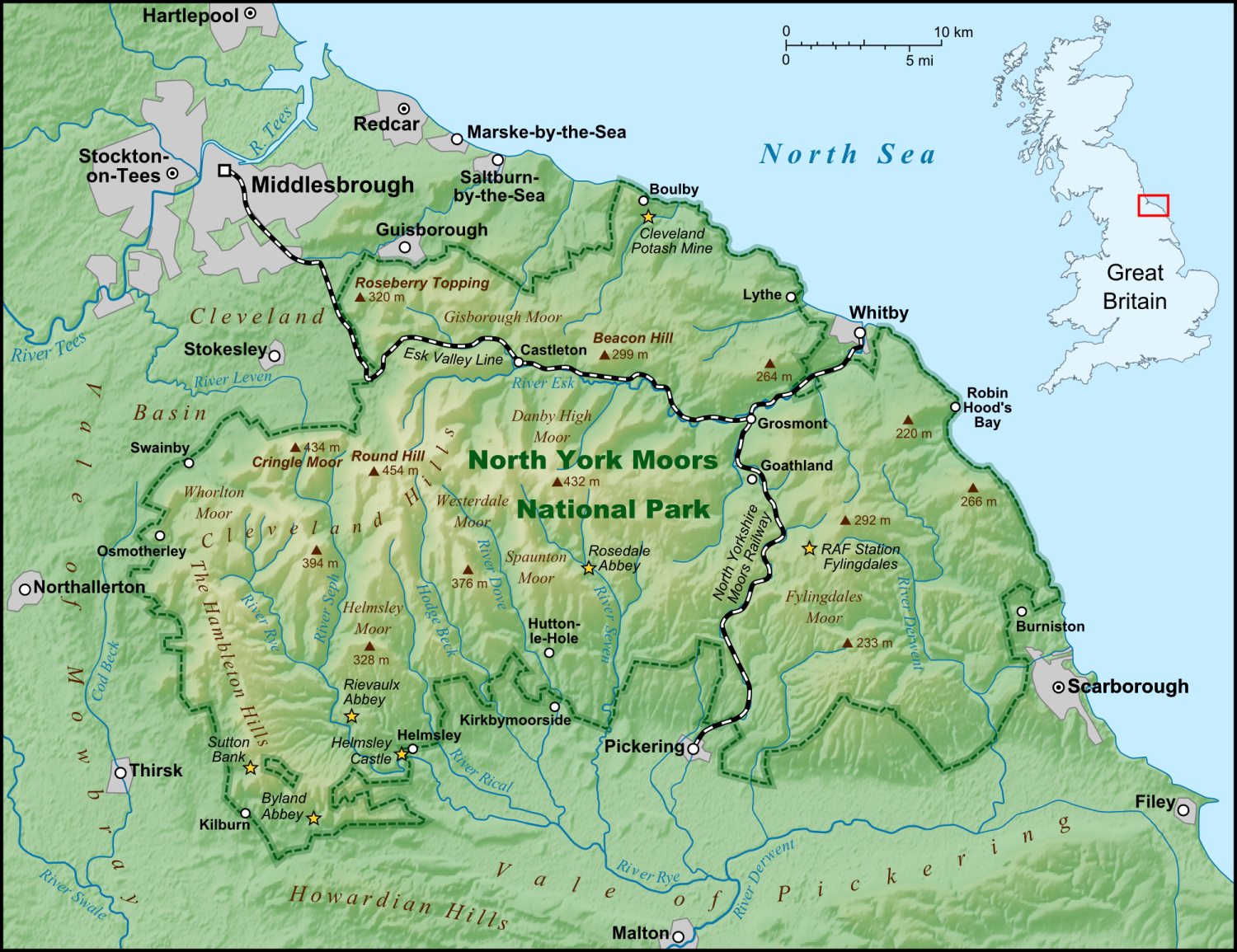
Map of the North York Moors area

There are numerous towns and villages on, or in the vicinity of, the Cleveland Hills including the following:

- Carlton-in-Cleveland
- Easby
- Great Ayton
- Great Broughton
- Guisborough
- Kildale
- Middlesbrough
- Newton under Roseberry
- Osmotherley
- Redcar
- Saltburn
- Skelton-in-Cleveland
- Slapewath
- Staithes
- Stokesley
- Swainby

== TV transmission ==
Bilsdale West Moor, situated in the Cleveland Hills, is home to the 294.6 metres (967 ft) tall Bilsdale transmitting station, providing 40–50 miles coverage of UHF transmissions for digital TV and radio in the north-east's Tyne Tees region. The digital switchover at Bilsdale was completed in two stages, on 12 and 26 September 2012, one of the last transmitters in England to complete this operation, the others being Pontop Pike and Chatton in the same region.

== Places of interest ==
- Captain Cook Birthplace Museum, Marton, Middlesbrough
- Captain Cook Monument, Easby Moor
- Captain Cook Schoolroom Museum, Great Ayton
- Roseberry Topping
- Wainstones, Hasty Bank

== See also ==
- List of Sites of Special Scientific Interest in Cleveland
- List of Sites of Special Scientific Interest in North Yorkshire
