= White Rose Way =

White Rose Way or The White Rose Way, may refer to:

- White Rose Way, Doncaster, part of the A6182 road in Doncaster, South Yorkshire, England
- White Rose Way (walking trail), a walking trail in West and North Yorkshire, England

== See also ==
- White Rose Walk, a walking trail in North Yorkshire
