= The Shrine of Our Lady of Mount Grace =

Religious site in North Yorkshire, England

Coordinates: 54.377°N 1.302°W

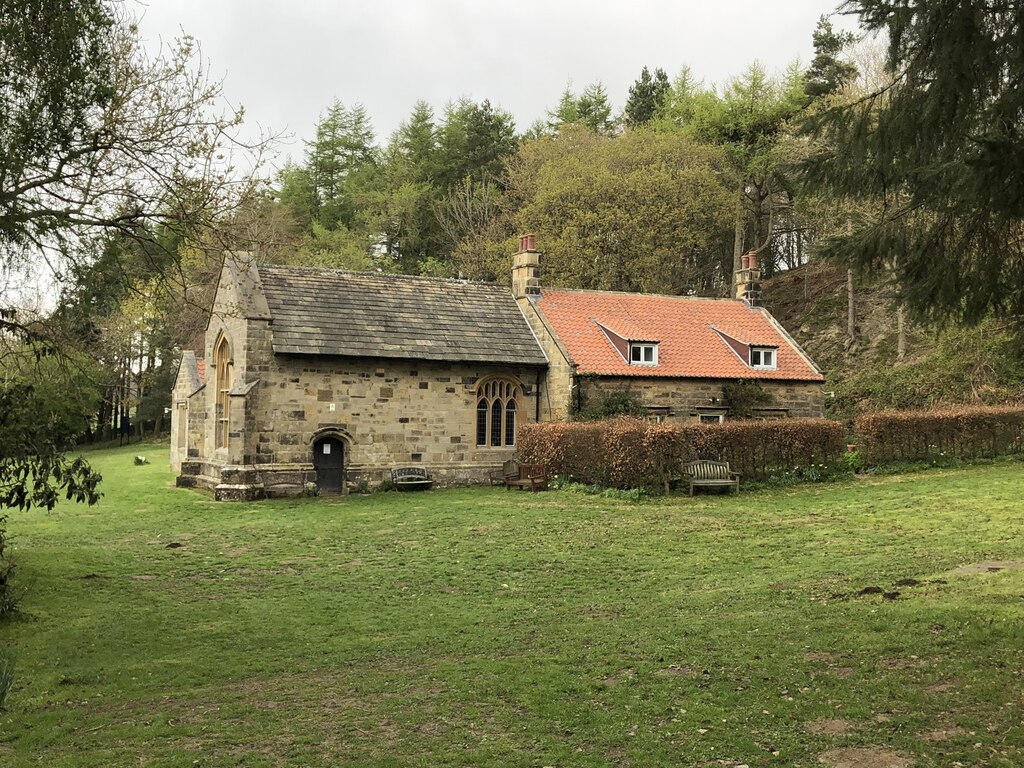
The Lady Chapel

The Shrine of Our Lady of Mount Grace is a place of Marian devotion and pilgrimage sited in the North Yorkshire village of Osmotherley. Christians have visited this small church, known as the “Lady Chapel”, for centuries and continue the tradition through an annual pilgrimage every summer on the Sunday nearest the Feast of the Assumption, 15 August.

== History ==
Its precise origins and history are unknown although records show that in 1397 John Ingelby was granted a licence for a chapel and the celebration of Mass. This mirrors the history of the nearby Mount Grace Priory when in 1398 Thomas de Holand (Thomas Holland, 1st Duke of Surrey) was granted a licence to found a Carthusian Monastery at Bordelby.

Little else is known about the Lady Chapel except that a former Franciscan, Thomas Parkinson, entered the hermitage at the Lady Chapel, provided for by Catharine of Aragon, in about 1515. He probably stayed until the 1539 dissolution of Mount Grace Priory and other religious sites. After this time, the Lady Chapel fell into a state of neglect and ruin.

Despite falling into ruin, the Lady Chapel continued to attract pilgrims and according to Fr A. J. Storey 16 people were arrested on the eve of Little Lady Day, 7 September 1614, and later confessed to praying there. Other reported visitors include the sisters from the Institute of the Blessed Virgin Mary, praying for their founder, Mary Ward, when she was seriously ill. She herself later came to the chapel to give thanks for her recovery. When John Wesley visited the area in 1745, he wrote “I saw the poor remains of the old chapel on the brow of the hill, as well as those of the Carthusian Monastery, (called Mount Grace), which lay at the foot of it.”

In the modern era, Flora Dysart describes in her book "The Pilgrims’ Way" how her grandmother, Flora Margaret Morrish, persuaded the local landowner, Sir Hugh Bell, to grant her a lease on the cottage adjoining the Lady Chapel with a view to restoration. Eventually, John Scott, 4th Earl of Eldon, and Ralph Scrope bought the Lady Chapel site. They then established a Trust to manage the rebuilding of the chapel; the adjoining cottage had been restored by Flora Margaret Morrish.

In 2025 the Cleveland Way long distance footpath was diverted to pass by the Lady Chapel.

== Restoration ==
Plans to restore the chapel were approved and planning permission was granted in 1957. The following year the Lady Chapel was recognised as a national monument and the Diocese of Middlesbrough's first Feast of the Assumption of Our Lady pilgrimage was organised. This has since become an annual event attracting hundreds of pilgrims on the Sunday closest to the 15 August feast.

Restoration started in 1959 and on the Feast of the Nativity of the Blessed Virgin Mary, 8 September 1961, William Godfrey, Cardinal Archbishop of Westminster, rededicated the chapel.

== Features ==
The chapel contains a 17th-century statue of the Madonna and Child and a carved wooden crucifix, both donated by Lady Eldon.

It also has three stained glass windows which feature the coat of arms of Queen Katharine of Aragon, the Scrope and Eldon families respectively.

== The chapel today ==
The chapel is now within the pastoral responsibilities of St Mary's Cathedral in Middlesbrough

Masses and services take place during the year, with a Vigil Mass being offered at 3 pm on Saturdays (fulfilling the Sunday obligation) and on feasts of Our Lady, and the chapel remains open at all times.

In 2016 Bishop of Middlesbrough Terence Patrick Drainey founded a group, the Friends of the Lady Chapel, with the purpose of preserving and promoting the shrine.
