= Carlton Bank =

Hill in the United Kingdom

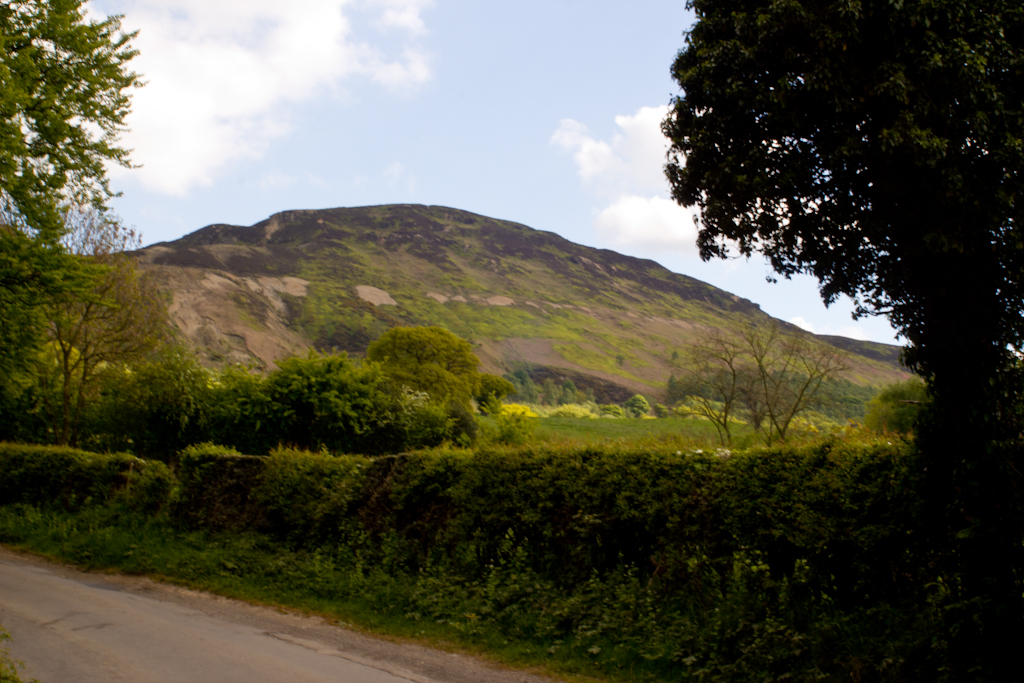
- Carlton Bank as seen from the north

Highest point
- Elevation: 408 m (1,339 ft)
- Listing: (none)
- Coordinates: 54°24′57.84″N 1°12′4.53″W

Geography
- Location: North York Moors, England
- Parent range: Cleveland Hills
- OS grid: NZ519026
- Topo map: OS Explorer OL26

Carlton Bank is a hill in the Cleveland Hills, in north-east England. It is within Carlton Moor in the North York Moors and overlooks the villages of Carlton-in-Cleveland and Faceby. The summit provides extensive views of Teesside including Middlesbrough and Redcar to the north as well as the surrounding moorland. Roseberry Topping can also be clearly seen from the summit in a north-easterly direction. The bank was host to an alum works in the 18th century.

The Cleveland Way National Trail crosses Carlton Bank and is part of Wainwright's Coast to Coast Walk.

A gliding club aerodrome was once situated approximately 500 metres (1,640 ft) south of the summit.

The rock band Mott the Hoople were photographed in the woods for the cover of their third album Wildlife in January 1971.

== Gallery ==
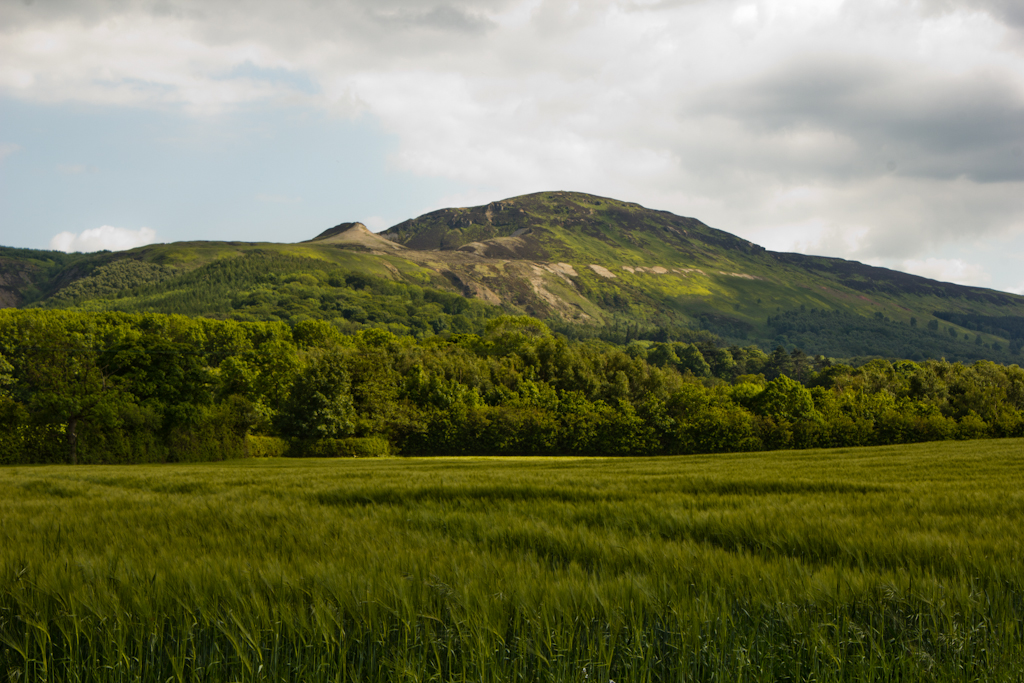
Carlton Bank from near Great Busby

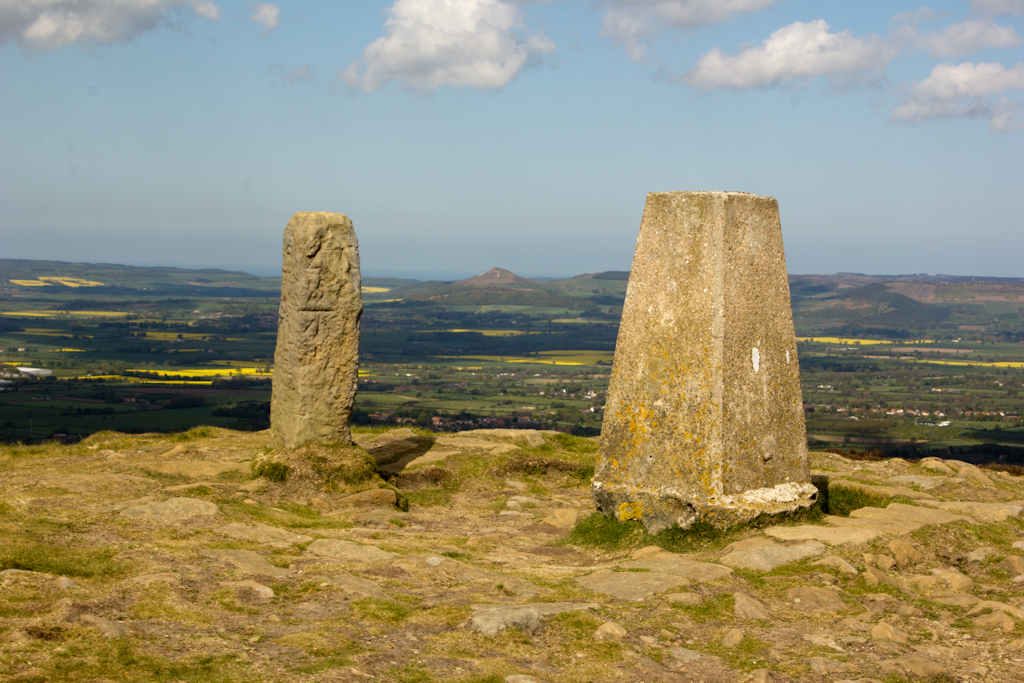
Summit of Carlton Bank

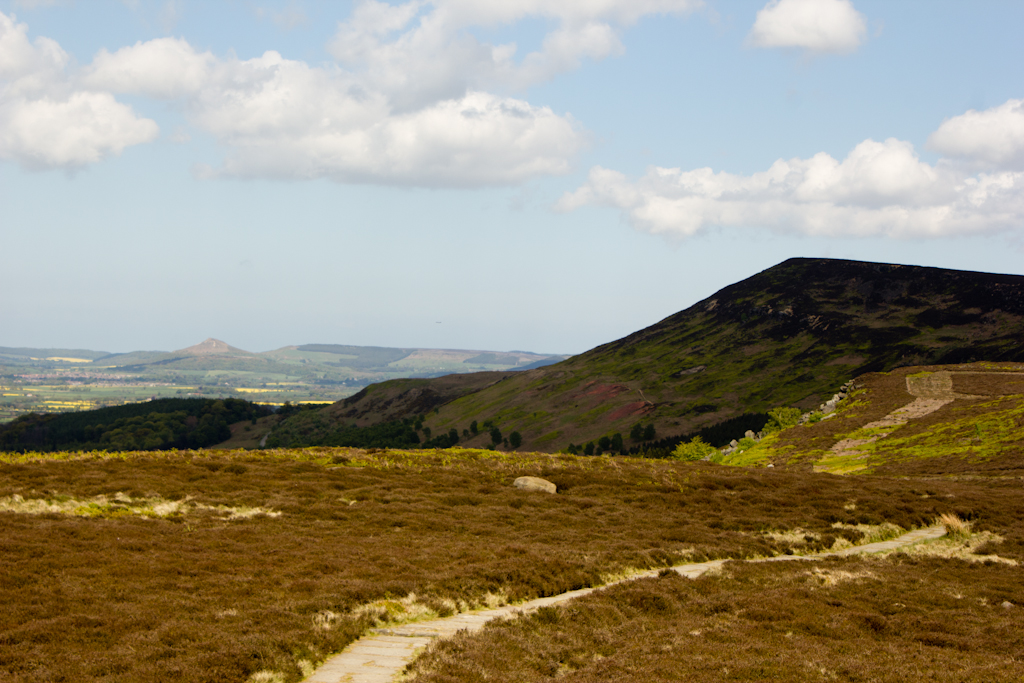
Carlton Bank from south-west

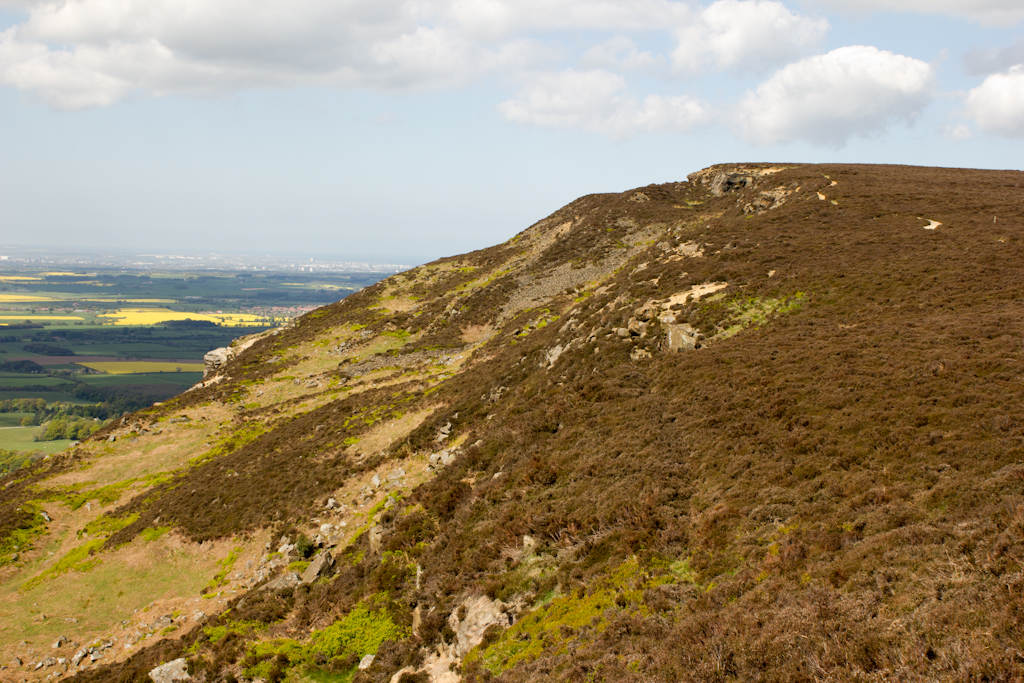
Carlton Bank's north-west face

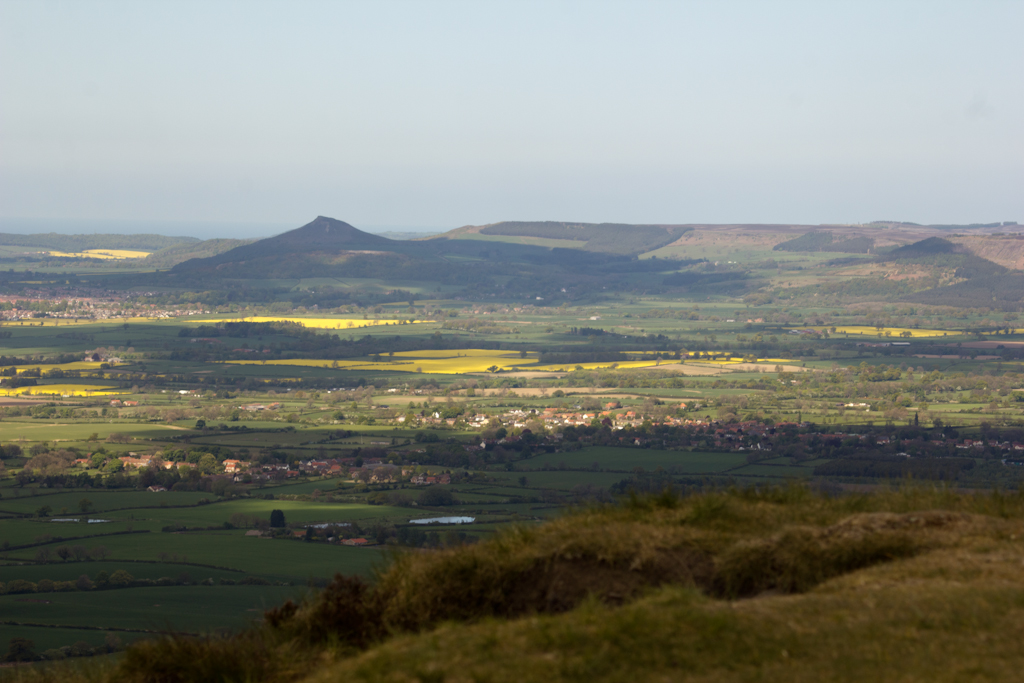
Roseberry Topping from Carlton Bank

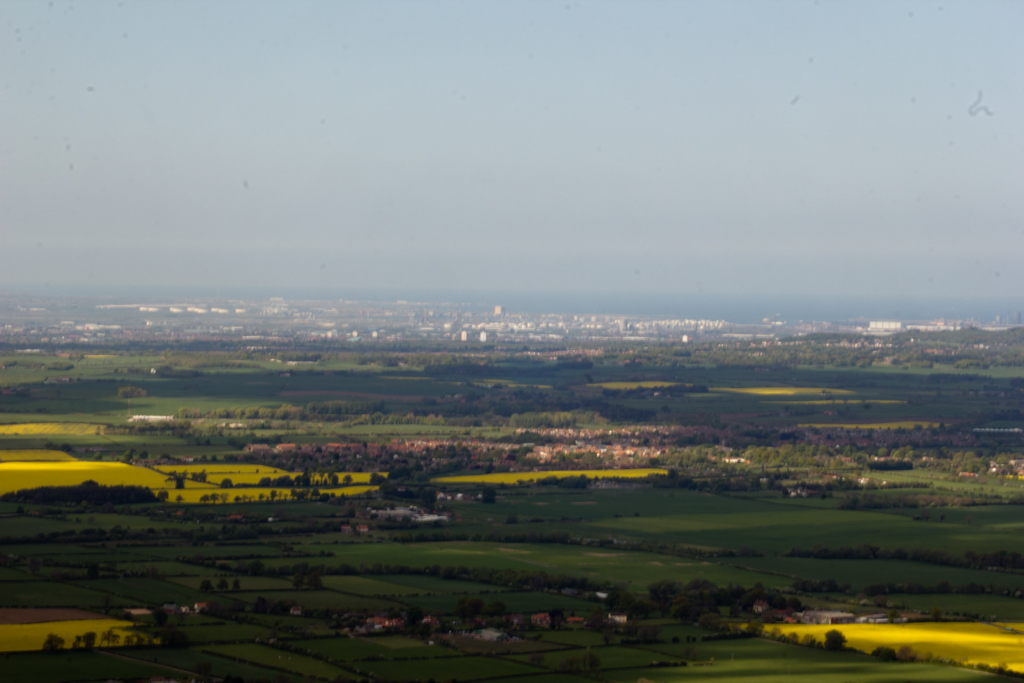
Teesside from Carlton Bank

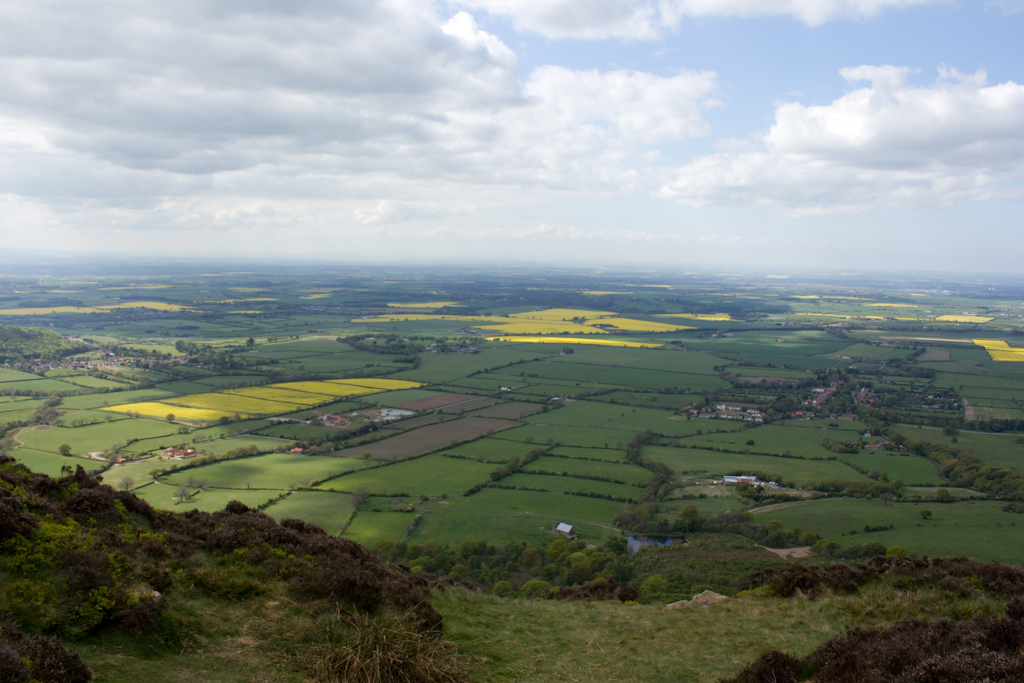
Faceby and Carlton-in-Cleveland from Carlton Bank
