= Kilburn White Horse =

Horse figure in North Yorkshire, England

Coordinates: 54°13′29.24″N 001°12′45.86″W

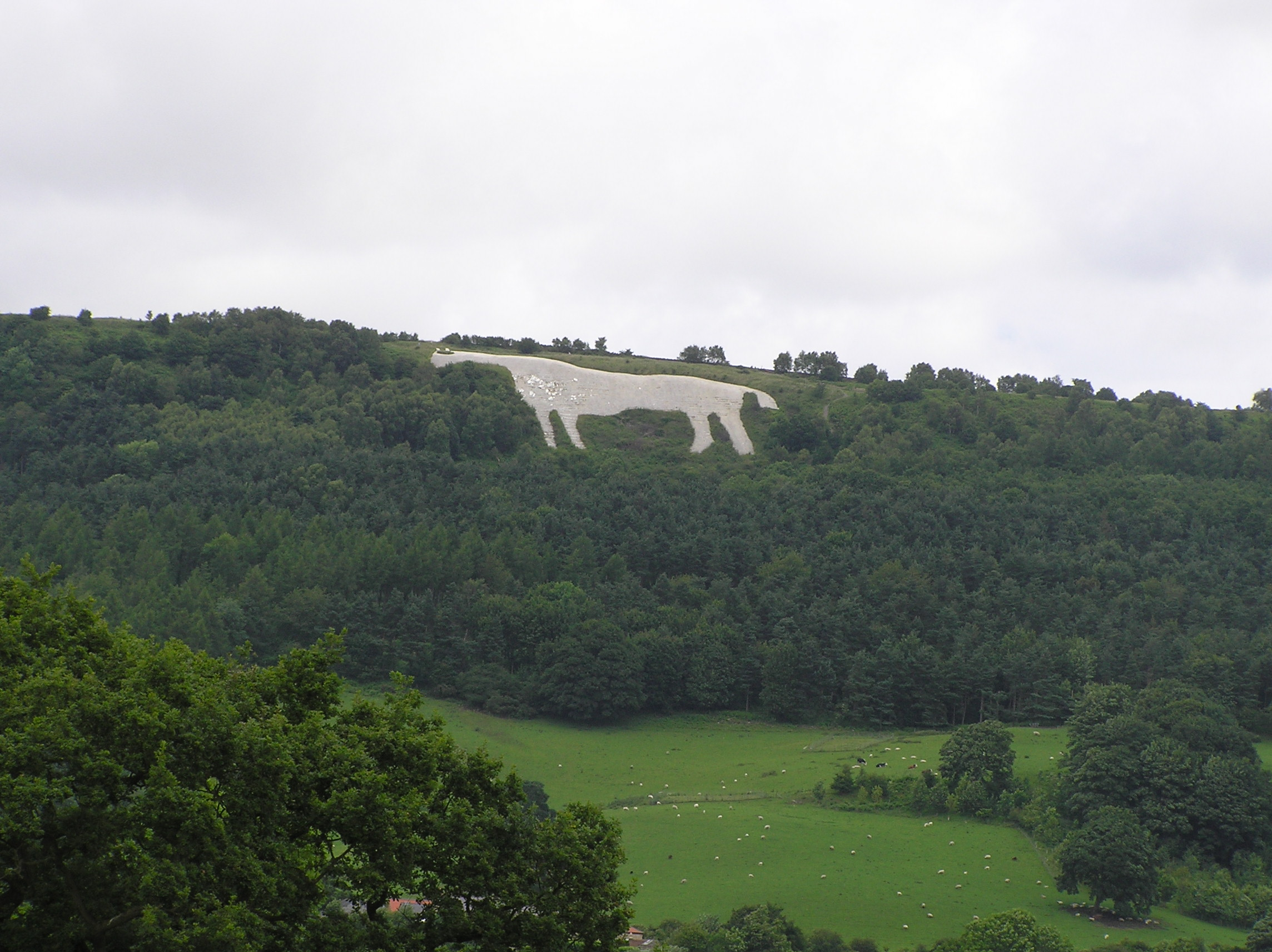
The White Horse near Kilburn - from Kilburn Village

The Kilburn White Horse is a hill figure cut into the hillside in the North York Moors National Park near Kilburn in North Yorkshire, England.

It is 318 feet (97 m) long by 220 ft (67 m) high and covers about 1.6 acres (6,475 m^{2}) and said to be the most northerly "chalk" hill figure in England.

Located on the southern flank of Sutton Bank, near Roulston Scar at the edge of the Hambleton table-land, it faces south-south-west and is visible from some distance, particularly from the East Coast Main Line railway south of Thirsk, and from the A19. On a clear day, the horse is visible from north Leeds, 28 miles (45 km) away on the higher ground to the west of the Vale of York.

Sutton Bank is formed of jurassic, limey sandstone and the horse was created by removing topsoil to expose that underlying rock, and covering it with white chalk chips.

It was created in November 1857, and some accounts state that it was done by schoolmaster John Hodgson and his pupils, together with local volunteers.

However, a tablet erected at the car park below it reads,

The Kilburn 'White Horse' -- This figure was cut in 1857 on the initiative of Thomas Taylor, a native of Kilburn. In 1925 a restoration fund was subscribed by the readers of the Yorkshire Evening Post and the residue of £100 was invested to provide for the triennial grooming of the figure.

Morris Marples in his 1949 book also gives Thomas Taylor the credit for being the prime mover: a native of Kilburn, he was a buyer for a London provision merchant. He seems to have attended celebrations at the Uffington White Horse in 1857, and he was inspired to give his home village a similar example. Thirty-three men were involved in cutting it, and 6 tons (6.1 metric tonnes) of lime were used to whiten the exposed rock.

Nowadays a car park is provided below the white horse and there is a footpath ascending past it and crossing immediately above it. The Cleveland Way long distance footpath reaches the horse from above. The image itself is now formed of off-white limestone chips, but the steep gradient of the hillside, especially at the horse's breast and forelegs, have led to slumping and retention boards have been fixed to restrain this.

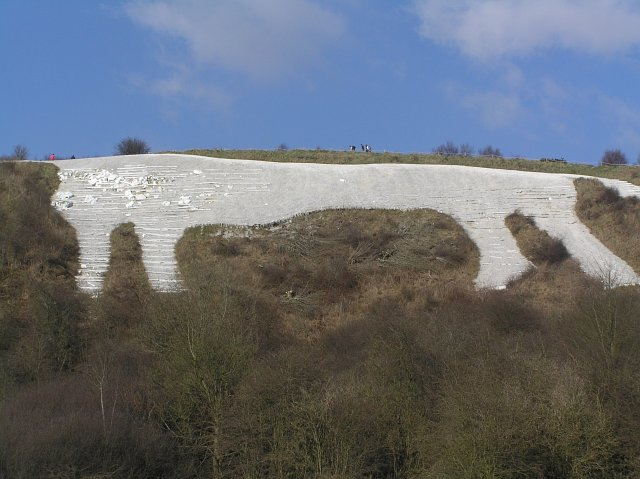
The White Horse as viewed from the car park beneath

The cutting of the current Litlington White Horse in East Sussex during 1924, was inspired by the story of the Kilburn horse.

The footpath offers a scenic view. The car park is located on a steeply graded minor road between Kilburn village and the Sutton Bank National Park Centre on the A170 road, and the best view of the white horse itself is from the Bagby road; benches are provided there to allow leisurely observation.

During World War II the horse was covered over to prevent it from becoming a conspicuous navigation landmark for enemy bombers.

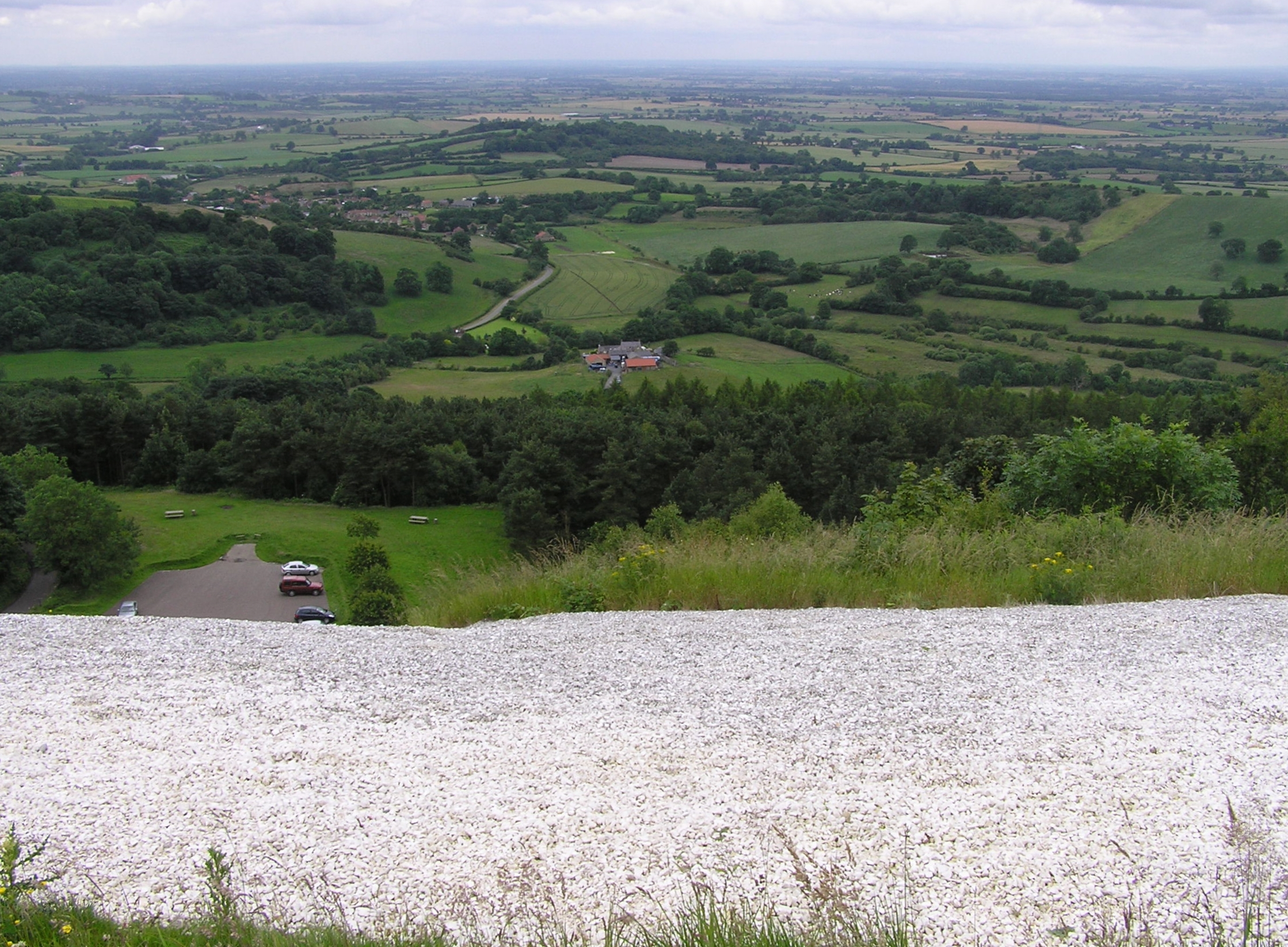
The View from the White Horse; the material forming the horse itself is at the bottom of the picture

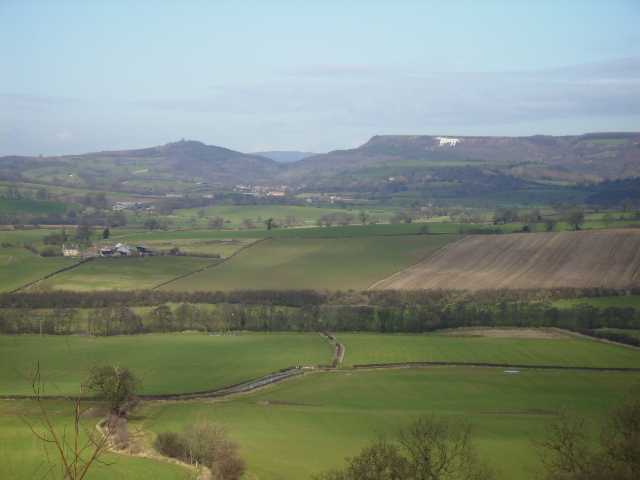
The White Horse from a distance

The horse featured in the launch video for Channel 3 North East, the rebranded version of regional ITV station Tyne Tees Television, in September 1996.

The horse was repainted in 2014. The Kilburn White Horse Association, run by volunteers, handed the site to Forestry England in 2018. In 2022, the horse was resprayed at a cost of £20,000.

== See also ==
- Cherhill White Horse
- Westbury White Horse
