= Sutton Bank =

Hill in North Yorkshire, England

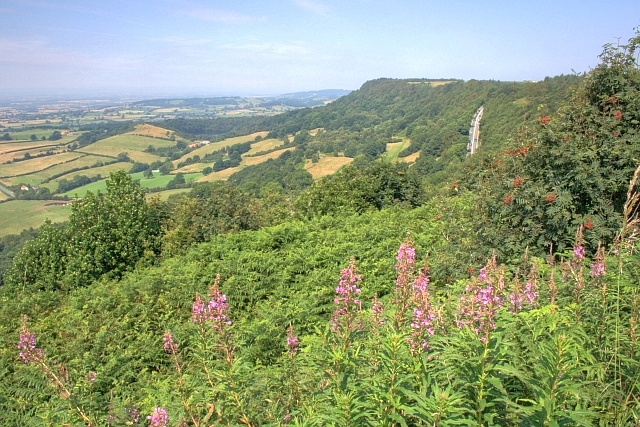
- A170 road climbing up Sutton Bank in North Yorkshire

Highest point
- Elevation: 978 ft (298 m)
- Listing: (none)
- Coordinates: 54.238°N 1.215°W

Geography
- Location: North York Moors National Park, England
- Parent range: Hambleton Hills
- OS grid: SE515815
- Topo map: OS Explorer OL26

Sutton Bank is a hill in the civil parishes of Cold Kirby and Sutton-under-Whitestonecliffe in the English county of North Yorkshire. It is a high point on the Hambleton Hills, with extensive views over the Vale of York and the Vale of Mowbray, and is in the North York Moors National Park.

The A170 road runs down the bank with a maximum gradient of 1 in 4 (25%), and including a hairpin bend. Vehicles have to keep in low gear whilst travelling up or down the bank, and caravans are banned. The village of Sutton-under-Whitestonecliffe lies on the A170 at the foot of the bank, whilst the village of Cold Kirby is on a side road at the top of the bank. Just to the south of Sutton Bank is Roulston Scar, a massive hillfort built in the Iron Age, around 400 BC.

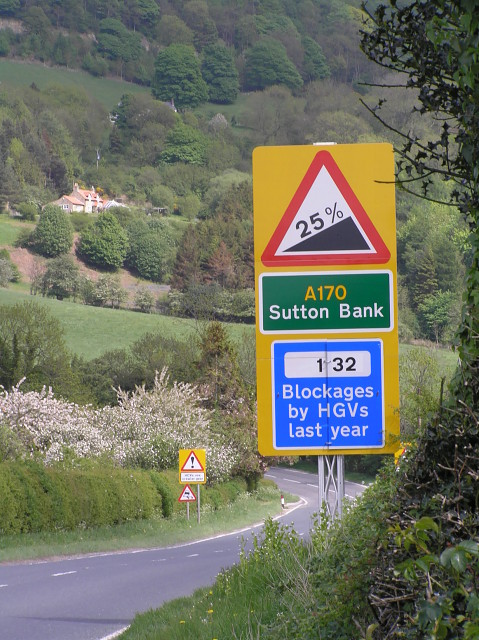
Warning signs on the approach to Sutton Bank

== History ==
Roulston Scar was the approximate location of the Battle of Old Byland, in which the Scots won a major victory over the English on 14 October 1322. King Robert the Bruce had made a forced march with his army in an attempt to surprise the English army, which was retreating from a failed invasion of Scotland. John of Brittany, Earl of Richmond, held the heights of Sutton Bank while King Edward II had withdrawn with his Queen to Rievaulx Abbey, about 16 miles (25 km) to the south-east. The Scots fought their way up the steep hillside to totally defeat the Earl, whom they took prisoner. King Edward fled ahead of Sir Walter Stewart's forces, leaving the Great Seal of England and much other treasure behind in the Abbey.

In 1981, an unidentified body was found at Sutton Bank which became known as the Nude in the Nettles.

In 2016, Sutton Bank was included on the route of the third stage of the Tour de Yorkshire cycle race.

== Recreation ==
The Yorkshire Gliding Club is based at the top of the hill. Sutton Bank bank faces the prevailing westerly winds and has been used for ridge soaring since the early 1930s.

The amateur radio repeater GB3HG is located at the Gliding club site.

Sutton Bank National Park Centre's exhibition explains how the distinctive landscape was formed by glaciers and provides views of Roulston Scar, Hood Hill, and Gormire Lake. There is a bike skills area and cycle shop. A walking route from the visitor centre takes in what author James Herriot called 'The Finest View in England'. In 2025 an accessible trail featuring four new bird-themed artworks by artist Adrian Riley was installed including poems by William Wordsworth and Ian Duhig inspired by the view. There are footpaths close by, including southwards to the White Horse of Kilburn. The 110-mile (177 km) long Cleveland Way National Trail crosses over Sutton Bank. The North York Moors National Park Authority has developed cycle trails from the visitor centre.

Sutton Bank is a designated Dark Sky Discovery Site, one of three in the North York Moors.

== See also ==
- Kilburn White Horse
