= A170 road =

Road in North Yorkshire, England

Coordinates: 54.2587°N 0.8468°W

A170

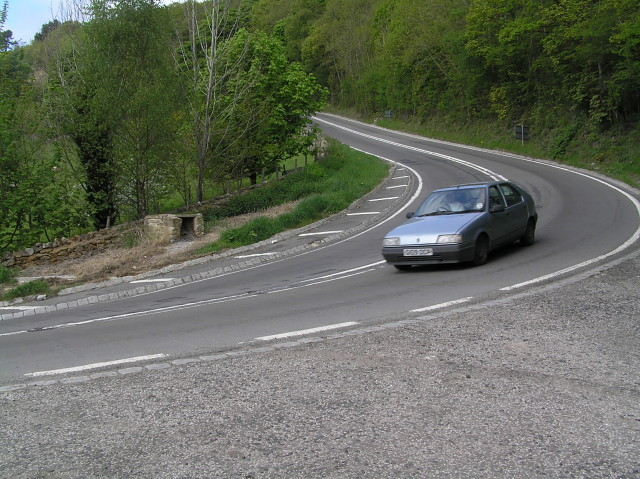
- The hairpin bend on Sutton Bank.

Route information
- Length: 43.7 mi (70.3 km)

Major junctions
- West end: Thirsk
- A19 A168 A169 A171; A64 A165
- East end: Scarborough

Location
- Country: United Kingdom

Road network
- Roads in the United Kingdom; Motorways; A and B road zones
← A169	→ A171

The A170 is an A road in North Yorkshire, England that links Thirsk with Scarborough via Sutton Bank and through Helmsley, Kirkbymoorside, and Pickering. The road is 47 miles (76 km), and a single carriageway for almost its totality.

The route has been in existence since prehistoric times and there are folk-tales about famous people from history using it. When turnpikes were installed between York and Coxwold and Ampleforth, drovers would take their cattle this way because it was wide enough and meant they avoided paying the tolls.

== Description of route ==
The road begins at Thirsk, sprouting off from the A19 road and A168 junction with a short section north into the town before turning due east and going over the dualled A19. After about 5 miles (8 km) and passing through the village of Sutton-under-Whitestonecliffe, it enters the North York Moors National Park and the Hambleton Hills and reaches the three sections of very steep (1 in 4 (25%)) gradients of Sutton Bank. This section of road also includes a hairpin bend and the road rises 520 feet (160 m) in under 1 mile (1.6 km). There is a viewpoint and North York Moors National Park visitor centre at the top of the hill.

The road continues east across Scawton Moor for 6 miles (9.7 km) before there is a 90° turn to the north and the B1257 joins from the south. Next is a short run northwards into Helmsley. Here the B1257 starts heading north-west and then north across the western edge of the moors to Stokesley. The A170 continues eastwards, following the corridor of the former railway between Helmsley and Pickering for 13 miles (21 km) through Beadlam, Nawton, Kirkbymoorside, Wrelton, Aislaby and Middleton before arriving at Pickering. Just east of Pickering town centre is the junction with the A169 Malton to Whitby road.

The road continues eastwards out of Pickering, and after just short of 1 mile (1.6 km) it leaves the North York Moors National Park. The road carries on for 18 miles (29 km) through Thornton-le-Dale, Allerston, Ebberston, Snainton, West Ayton and East Ayton, until there roughly parallel to the former Forge Valley railway, before arriving in Scarborough. It first meets the A171 from Middlesbrough then it has a junction with the A64 in the Falsgrave area of Scarborough town.

== Safety ==
The road itself has been described as High Risk. In 2001, the AA labelled the route as one of the most dangerous in Britain. Caravans have been prohibited from going either up or down Sutton Bank since May 1984 as the steep gradient and hairpin bend makes it dangerous for caravans and HGVs. There is an alternative route signposted through Coxwold and Ampleforth for banned vehicles. In an average year, 120 HGVs break down and another 400 suffer problems ascending or descending the route. New signage and the application of an anti-skid surface has improved the situation and seen a reduction of 23% of serious problems in the first year after the improvements.

Barkers Lane cross roads at Snainton is also listed as an accident blackspot.

== Buses ==
No bus services travel the length of the A170 from Thirsk to Scarborough, but East Yorkshire's route 128 uses the road, with minor diversions, from Helmsley to Scarborough. The service runs about every two hours, seven days a week.
