= Filey Brigg =

Headland in North Yorkshire, England

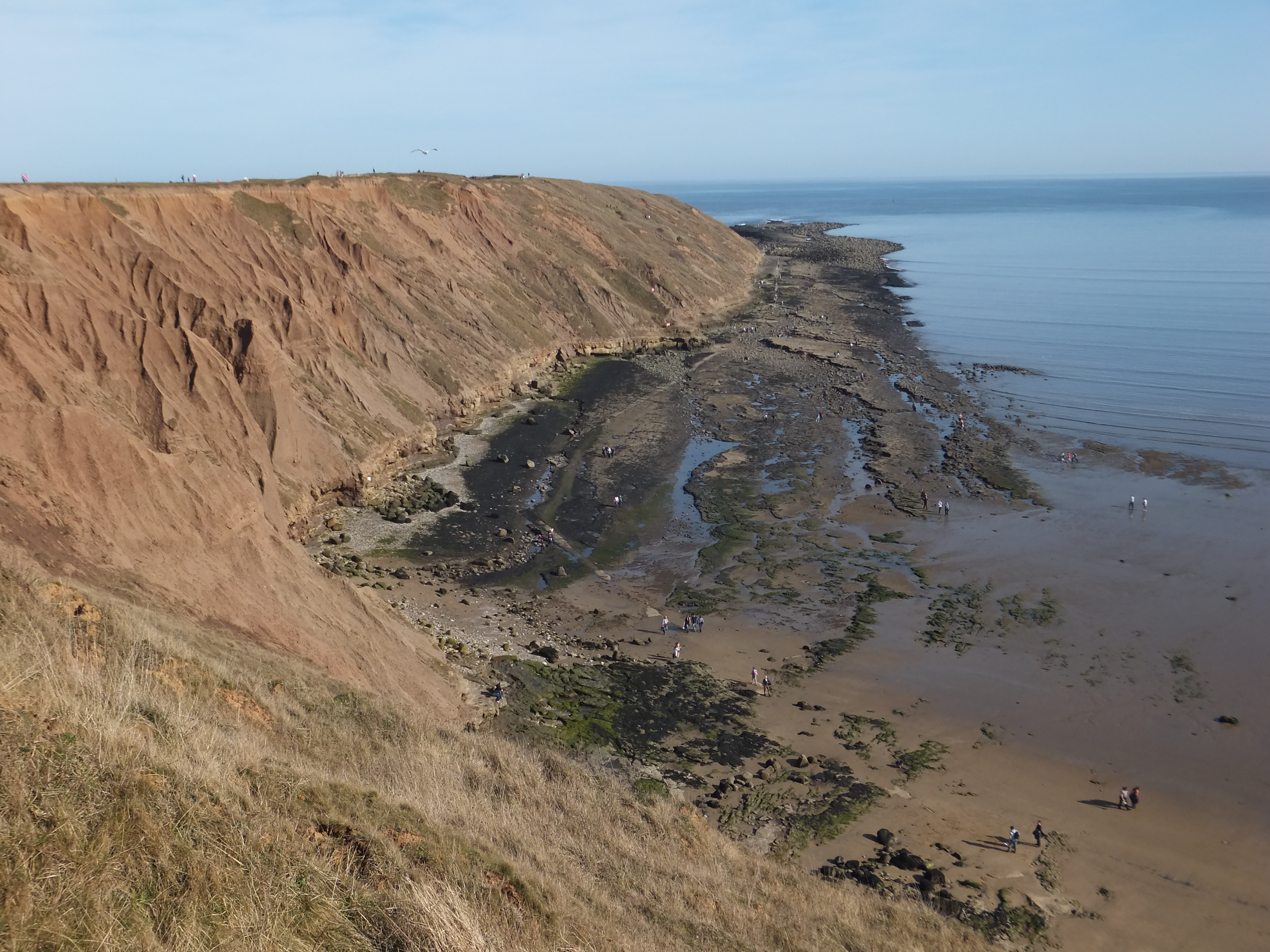
- Filey Brigg: Carr Naze seen from Filey Brigg Country Park

Highest point
- Coordinates: 54°13′03″N 0°16′09″W

Geography
- Location: North Yorkshire, England

Filey Brigg is a long narrow peninsula situated about a mile north of Filey, North Yorkshire. Its steep cliffs are 20 metres high and consist of a variety of material, from pure sandstone to pure limestone. The landward end of the peninsula is known as Carr Naze or Carr Nase, whilst the long neck of rock at the seaward end is called the Brigg. In the early 1970s the fields on top of the Brigg were turned into Filey Brigg Country Park. The biology and geology of Filey Brigg place it among Sites of Special Scientific Interest in North Yorkshire.

== Ancient history ==
The first record of Filey Brigg's ancient history was made by a local antiquarian, Dr Cortis (MD), who excavated a Roman signal station in 1857. In November that year he delivered a lecture to Filey's antiquarians in which he enumerated a number of findings made by "a painter belonging to Filey, named Wilson", who had found large quantities of Roman pottery, bones and charred wood in the area of Carr Naze on the northern side of Filey Bay. The findings encouraged more excavations, the result of which was five large stones believed to be altars or bases of pillars, a dog chasing a stag being carved on one of them. Cortis also reported that near one of the stones an inscription had been found bearing part of two lines:

CÆSAR S E
Q V A M . S P E

Further investigations conducted in 1920 resulted in the belief that the five stones found by Cortis were foundations of a wooden watchtower. However no further remains are visible nowadays because of cliff erosion. It was concluded that the signal station was erected in the late 4th century and was abandoned or plundered around 400 A.D. The five stones can now be seen in the Filey Crescent Gardens.

== Geology and wildlife ==
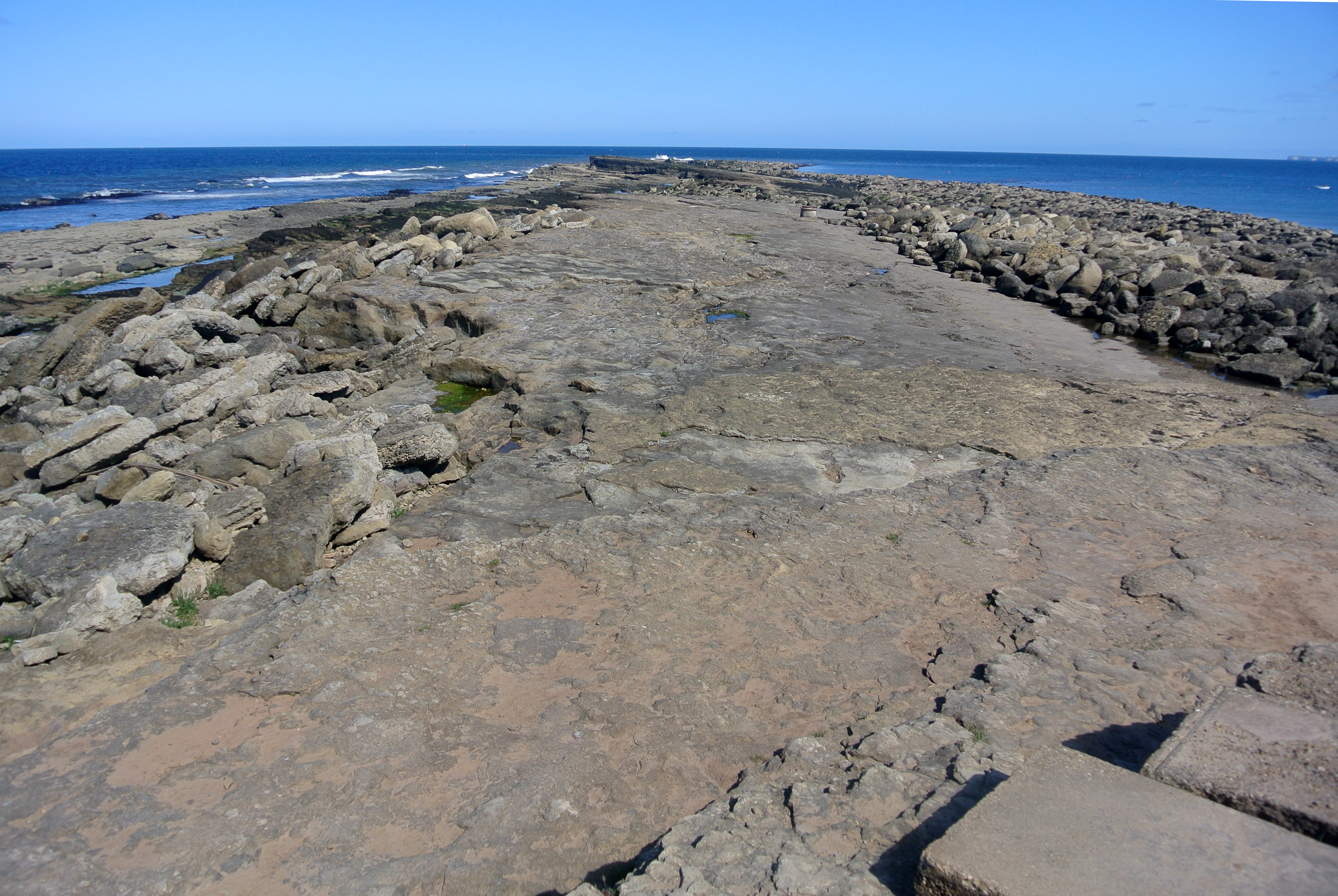
The Brigg at Filey Brigg, looking along its axis seaward.

The existence of the entire structure of Filey Bay and the Brigg is caused by the fact that the rock on the south side of the Brigg slid down, causing the overlying clay to lie either at or below the level of the sea, which eroded it to form Filey Bay. The hard rock on the northern side juts out to form the Brigg. The structure still erodes and large rock slips caused by constant rapid erosion of the clay cliffs of Carr Naze have been witnessed. The last one occurred in 1869 and took away several hundred metres of the Naze.

The rocks of Filey Brigg as well as the intertidal zone attract numerous species of birds, such as oystercatchers, redshanks and purple sandpipers, which visit the shoreline in nationally significant numbers during the winter.

== Folklore ==
There are two legends concerning the formation of the long ridge of rocks known as Filey Brigg. According to one of them it was built by the Devil, who, having lost his hammer in the sea, reached for it with his hand but caught a fish instead. The Devil exclaimed, "Hah! Dick!", which accounts for the name of the fish – haddock. Since then Filey Brigg has carried the marks of the Devil's grasp on its shoulders.

Another legend states that the rocks were the bones of a dragon, which terrorized the area but was outsmarted by the townsfolk, who drowned it when it dived into the sea to wash parkin (a Yorkshire cake) from between its teeth.
