= Roseberry Topping =

Prominent hill and landmark in North Yorkshire, England

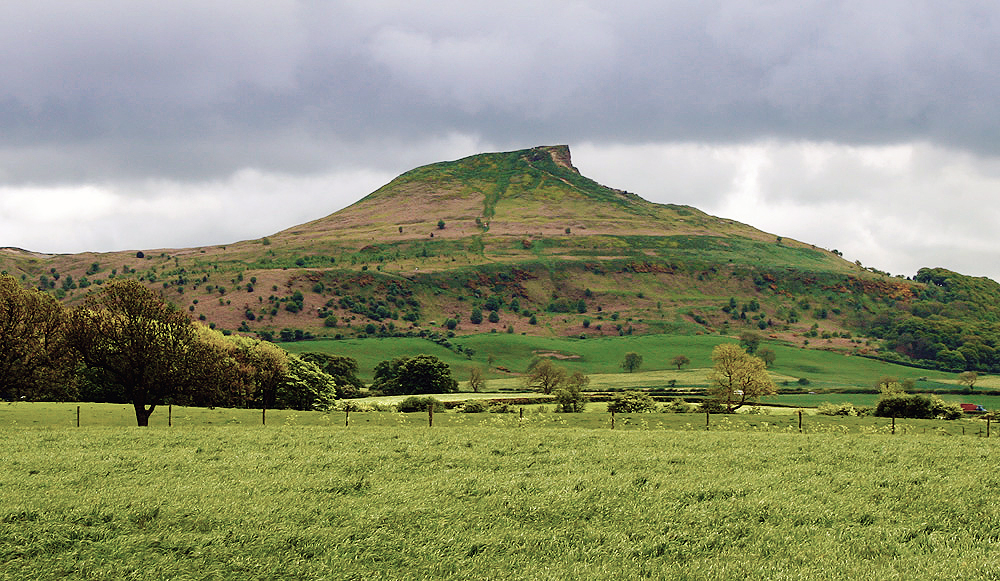
- Roseberry Topping from the north

Highest point
- Elevation: 320 m (1,050 ft)
- Prominence: 81 m (266 ft)
- Coordinates: 54°30′20″N 1°06′26″W

Geography
- Location within North Yorkshire
- Location: North York Moors, England
- OS grid: NZ579126
- Topo map: OS Landranger 193

Roseberry Topping is a distinctive hill in North Yorkshire, England. It is situated near Great Ayton and Newton under Roseberry. Its summit has a distinctive half-cone shape with a jagged cliff, which has led to many comparisons with the much higher Matterhorn in the Swiss-Italian Alps. It is a symbol of the area and features in the logo of the nearby Teesside International Airport.

At 1,049 feet (320 m), Roseberry Topping was traditionally thought to be the highest hill on the North York Moors but there are 15 higher peaks, with the nearby Urra Moor being the highest, at 1,490 feet (450 m). Roseberry Topping offers views of Captain Cook's Monument on Easby Moor and the monument on Eston Nab, previously a beacon.

== Geology ==
The hill is an outlier of the North York Moors uplands. It is formed from sandstone laid down in the Middle and Lower Jurassic periods, between 208 and 165 million years ago, which constitutes the youngest sandstone to be found in any of the national parks in England and Wales. Its distinctive conical shape is the result of the hill's hard sandstone cap protecting the underlying shales and clays from erosion by the effects of ice, wind and rain.

Until 1912 the summit resembled a sugarloaf, until a geological fault and possibly nearby alum and ironstone mining caused it to collapse. The area immediately below the summit is still extensively pitted and scarred from the former mineworks. From the summit there are magnificent views across the Cleveland plain as far as the Pennines on a clear day, some 40–50 miles (64–80 km) away.

== History ==
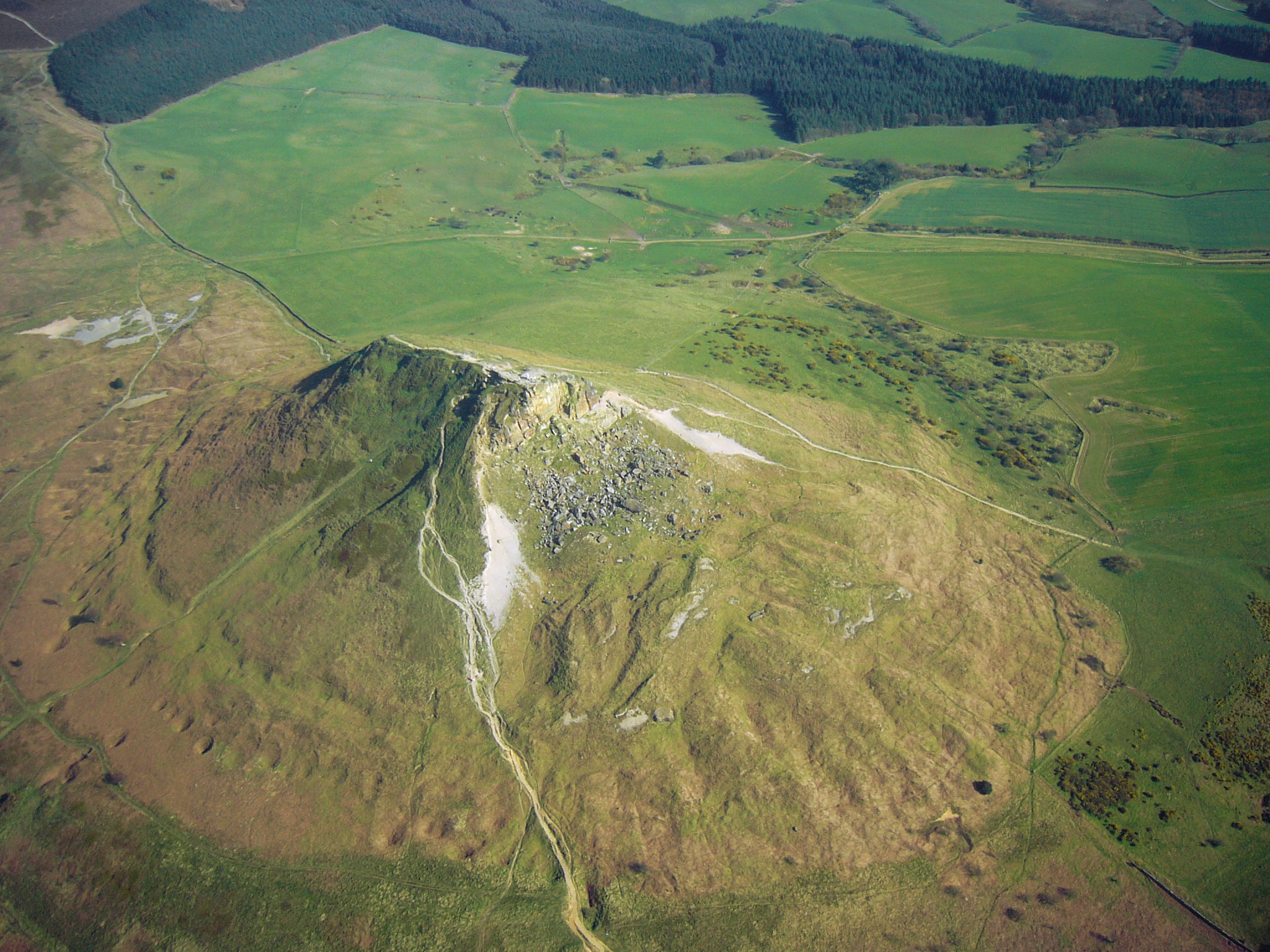
Aerial photo

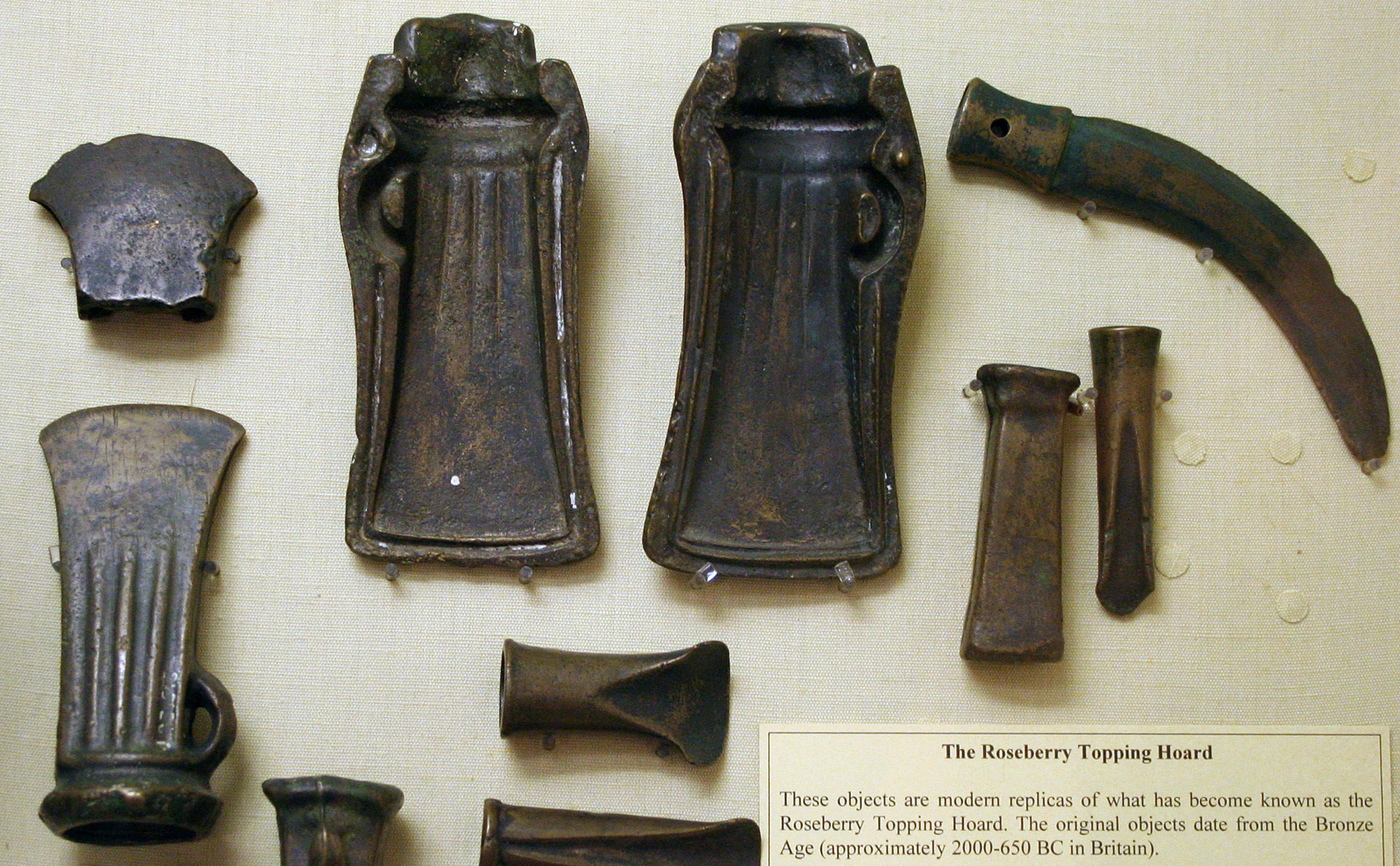
Replicas of the Bronze Age Roseberry Topping hoard

The Roseberry area has been inhabited for thousands of years and the hill has long attracted attention for its distinctive shape. A Bronze Age hoard was discovered on the slopes of the hill and is now in the Sheffield City Museum. It was occupied during the Iron Age: walled enclosures and the remains of huts dating from the period are still visible in the vicinity of the hill. During this period Jet may have been mined in the area.

The hill may have been held in special regard by the Vikings who settled in Cleveland during the early medieval period and gave the area many of its place names. They gave Roseberry Topping its present name: first attested in 1119 as Othenesberg, its second element is accepted to derive from Old Norse bjarg (rock) and the first element must be an Old Norse personal name, Authunn or Óthinn, giving 'Authunn's/Óthinn's rock'. If the latter, Roseberry Topping is one of only a handful of known pagan names in England, being named after the Norse god Odin and paralleled by the Old English name Wodnesberg, found for example in Woodnesborough, or Woden Law. The name changed successively to Othensberg, Ohenseberg, Ounsberry and Ouesberry before finally settling on Roseberry. ‘Topping’ is a Yorkshire dialectal derivation of Old English topp, top (of a hill). The naming of the hill may thus fit a well-established pattern in Continental Europe of hills and mountains being named after Odin or the Germanic equivalent, Wodan. Aelfric of Eynsham, writing in the 10th century, recorded how "the heathens made him into a celebrated god and made offerings to him at crossroads and brought oblations to high hills for him. This god was honoured among all heathens and he is called ... Othon in Danish."

In 1736, explorer James Cook's family moved to Airey Holme Farm at nearby Great Ayton. When he had time off from working on the farm with his father, young James took himself off up Roseberry Topping, which gave him his first taste for adventure and exploration, which was to stay with him for life.

Roseberry Topping can be seen from many miles away and was long used by sailors and farmers as an indicator of impending bad weather. An old rhyme commemorates this usage:

When Roseberry Topping wears a cap, let Cleveland then beware of a clap!

The hill was private property for many years, formerly being part of a game estate owned by the Cressy family. In the early 18th century, Dorothea Cressy married Archibald Primrose, who was later made Earl of Rosebery. Roseberry Topping is now managed by the National Trust and is open to the public. It is just within the North York Moors National Park, the border of which runs along the A173 road below it.

A spur of the Cleveland Way National Trail runs up to the summit. The path has been a sightseeing excursion route for centuries owing to the views of the Cleveland area from the summit: as early as 1700 travellers were recommended to visit the peak to see "the most delightful prospect upon the valleys below to the hills above."

The site was notified as a geological Site of Special Scientific Interest in 1954, with a boundary extension in 1986 bringing the designated area to 10.86 hectares. The site is listed as being of national importance in the Geological Conservation Review.

During the Napoleonic Wars, the Wensleydale volunteers responded to a false alarm when the beacon on Penhill, in Wensleydale, North Yorkshire was lit in response to a supposed lit beacon on Roseberry Topping, 40 miles distant. It turned out to be burning heather.

A number of footpaths climbing the hill have been restored during the 2020s. As of 2025, one path had been restored, surveys were underway for four other paths and funding had been confirmed for the restoration of all the paths.

== In popular culture ==
In Joseph Reed's 1761 farce The Register-Office, the character Margery Moorpout, who hails from 'Yatton', sings the praises of 'Roseberry', which she claims to be a mile and a half high:

Certainly God! ye knaw Roseberry? I thought ony Fule had knawn Roseberry!—It's t' biggest Hill in oll Yorkshire—It's aboun a Mile an a hofe high, an as coad as Ice at' top on't i't hettest Summer's Day—that it's.

In 1783, Thomas Pierson, a blacksmith, watchmaker and schoolmaster from the nearby town of Stokesley, wrote an eponymous poem about the hill. Pierson's work was much admired locally and it was republished in 1847.
