= Vale of Mowbray =

Region of North Yorkshire, England

Coordinates: 54.342°N 1.435°W

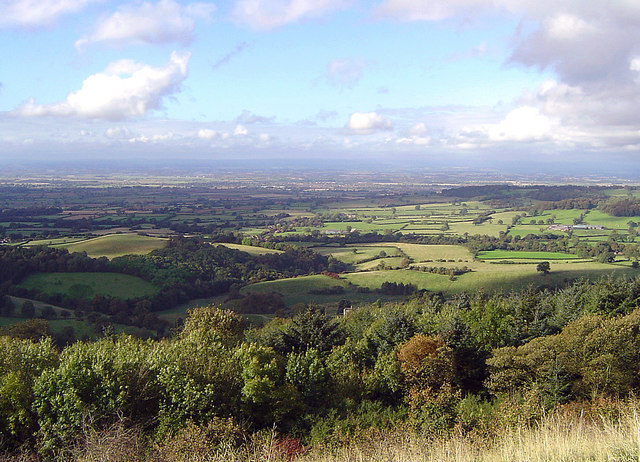
A view from the Hambleton Hills over the Vale of Mowbray, towards the Yorkshire Dales

The Vale of Mowbray is a plain in North Yorkshire, England. It is bounded by the Tees lowlands to the north, the North York Moors and the Hambleton Hills to the east, the Vale of York to the south, and the Yorkshire Dales to the west. Northallerton and Thirsk are the largest settlements within the area. The Vale of Mowbray is distinguishable from the Vale of York by its meandering rivers and more undulating landscape.

The vale is the floodplain of the River Swale and its tributaries, including the Wiske and Cod Beck. The river enters the vale from Swaledale, in the north-west, then flows in a south-easterly direction before entering the Vale of York. The underlying geology of the landscape is sandstone and mudstone, with clays and silts in the south-west.

The region is agricultural, with a mix of arable and grassland, though isolated pockets of woodland remain. The fields are medium-sized and typically bounded by hawthorn hedges. The villages are often linear, following the major through road, and the houses are generally brick built with pantile roofs. The vale is a major north-south transport corridor, containing the A1 road and the East Coast Main Line, which are respectively the main road and rail links between London and Edinburgh.

== Description ==
The vale takes its name from the family who were granted the rights to the land after the Norman Conquest of 1066. Robert de Mowbray, whose family had a stronghold at Thirsk Castle, was given the land by William the Conqueror in 1086.

The Natural England definition of the boundaries of the Vale of Mowbray are the edge of the North York Moors in the east up to the A19/A172 junction; directly across to the junction at Scotch Corner on the A1(M), then straight down the A1(M) for a western boundary and the rough line from the A168 at Dishforth to Thirsk in the east.

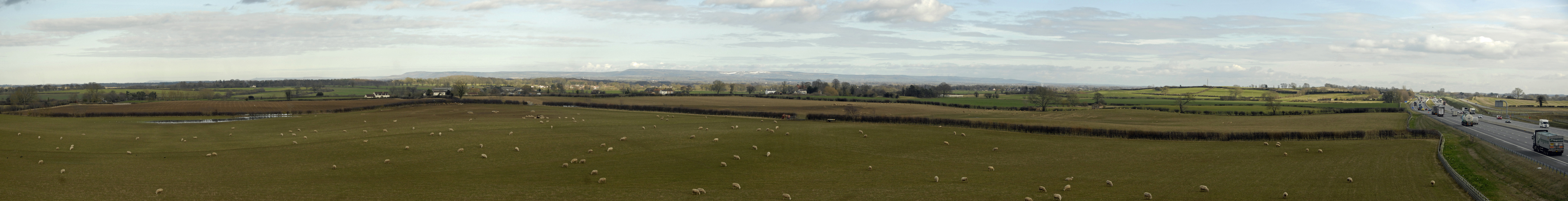
Looking south across the Vale of Mowbray in North Yorkshire. North York Moors are in the distance and the A1(M) is on the right.

Geological surveys list the Vale of Mowbray being bounded to the west by the River Ure, and in the east by the foot of the Hambleton Hills.

== Features ==
=== Settlements ===
- Bedale
- Brompton
- Catterick
- Crakehall
- East Cowton
- Kirkby Fleetham
- Kirkby Wiske
- Middleton Quernhow
- Northallerton
- Romanby
- Scorton
- Theakston
- Thirsk

=== Major roads ===
- A1(M) motorway North-South
- A19 North-South
- A167 North-South
- A684 East-West

=== Railways ===
- East Coast Main Line
- Northallerton–Eaglescliffe line
- Scruton–Redmire
- Eryholme–Richmond branch line (closed)
- Leeds–Northallerton railway (closed)

=== Rivers ===
- River Swale
- River Wiske
- Cod Beck
