= Urra Moor =

Hill in North Yorkshire, England

Coordinates: 54.406°N 1.086°W

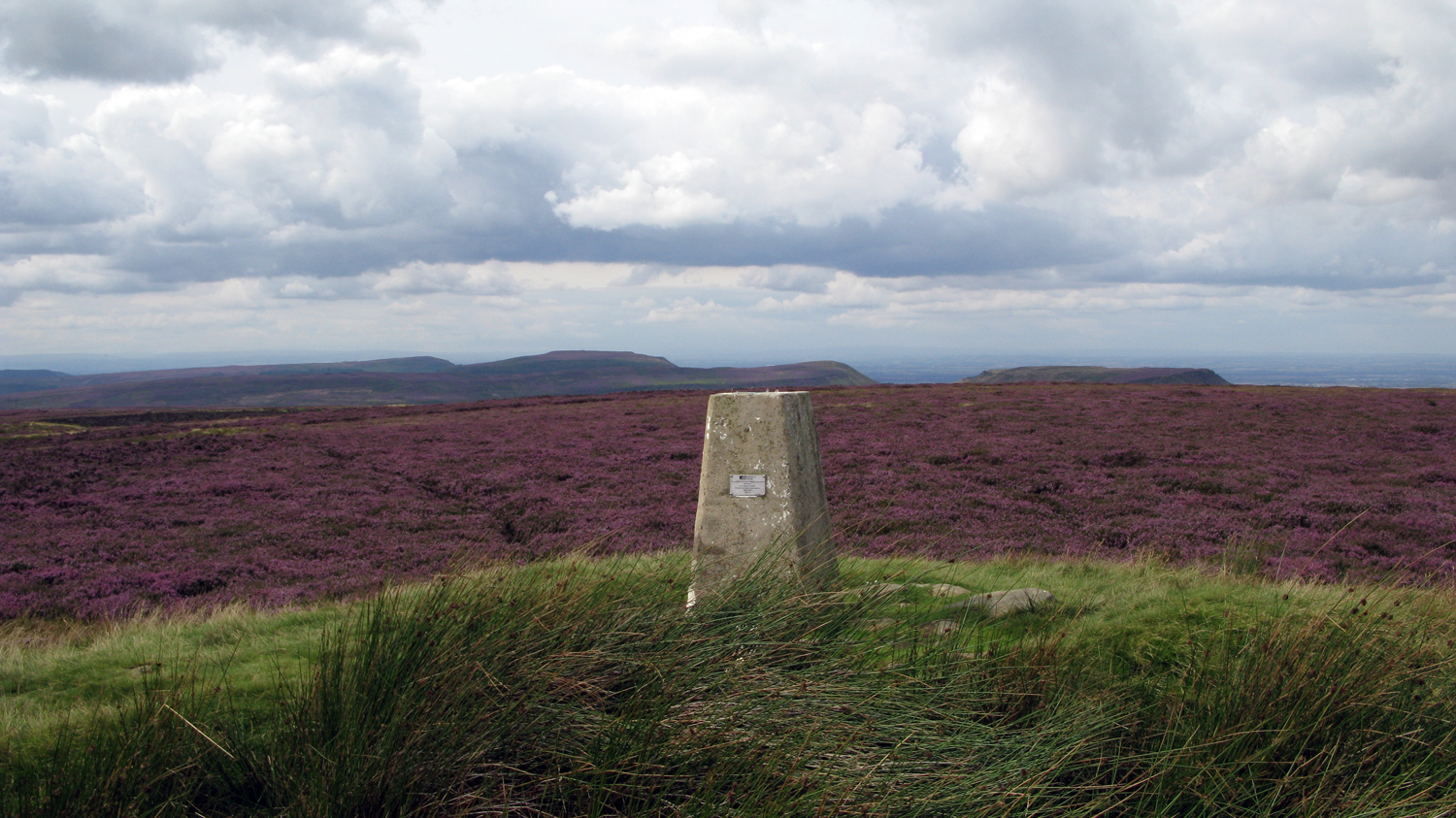
- Round Hill, the summit of Urra Moor

Highest point
- Elevation: 454 m (1,490 ft)
- Prominence: 409 m (1,342 ft)
- Listing: Marilyn

Geography
- Location: North York Moors, England
- OS grid: NZ594015
- Topo map: OS Landranger 93

Urra Moor is the highest moor in the North York Moors, North Yorkshire, England. At 1,490 feet (454 m) above sea level it is the highest point in the former Hambleton District and the North York Moors National Park, and the fourteenth most prominent hill in England. The name is a mix of Old English and Old Norse (horh and haugr) which means The Dirty Hill. The name of Urra Moor applies to the moor as a whole; the summit itself is known as Round Hill.

The summit is crowned by a trig point, and a track passes about 110 yards (100 m) to the south of this point. This track forms part of the route of both the Lyke Wake Walk and the Cleveland Way, and also forms the most commonly used route of ascent for Urra Moor. It is 1.9 miles (3 km) from the car park at Clay Bank to the summit via this route; total ascent is just under 660 feet (200 m).

Urra Moor is noted for its prehistoric remains. There are a number of barrows, and several carved rocks, including some cup and ring carvings. Probably the most striking relic is the Face Stone, a carved stone about 3 feet 3 inches (1 m) in height into which has been carved the shape of a face.

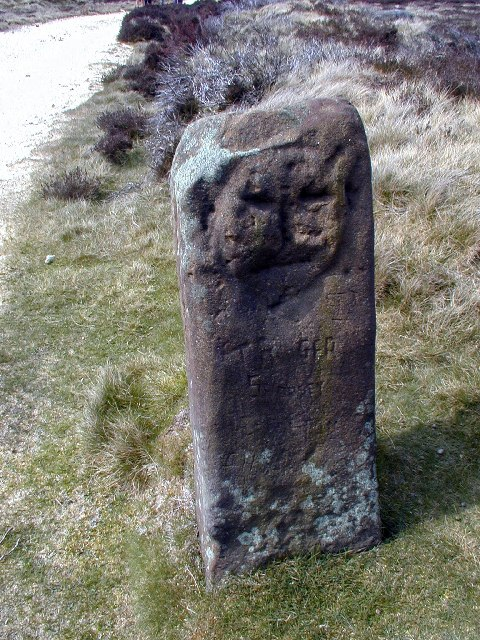
The Face Stone
