= Vale of York =

Low-lying plain in North Yorkshire, England

Coordinates: 54.04°N 1.19°W

Ordnance Survey map centred on the Vale of York (1921)

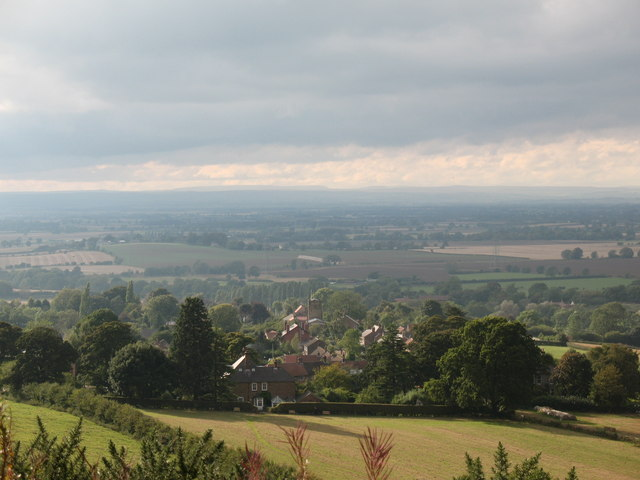
View over the vale from Husthwaite on the edge of the Howardian Hills

The Vale of York is an area of flat land in the northeast of England. The vale is a major agricultural area and serves as the main north–south transport corridor for Northern England.

The Vale of York is often supposed to stretch from the River Tees in the north to the Humber Estuary in the south. More properly it is just the central part of this area which is truly the Vale of York, with the Vale of Mowbray to its north and the Humberhead Levels to its south. It is bounded by the Howardian Hills and Yorkshire Wolds to the east and the Pennines to the west. The low-lying ridge of the Escrick moraine marks its southern boundary. York lies in the middle of the area.

== Geography ==
=== Climate ===
As part of Great Britain, the Vale of York generally has cool summers and relatively mild winters. Weather conditions vary from day to day as well as from season to season. The latitude of the area means that it is influenced by predominantly westerly winds with depressions and their associated fronts, bringing with them unsettled and windy weather, particularly in winter. Between depressions there are often small mobile anticyclones that bring periods of fair weather. In winter anticyclones bring cold dry weather. In summer the anticyclones tend to bring dry settled conditions which can lead to drought. For its latitude this area is mild in winter and cooler in summer due to the influence of the Gulf Stream in the North Atlantic. Air temperature varies on a daily and seasonal basis. The temperature is usually lower at night and January is the coldest time of the year. The vale is in the rain shadow of the Pennines so has a lower rainfall total than areas to the west. It is also subject to more fog and frosts in winter than other areas because of the tendency of cold air to drain into the vale from surrounding higher ground.

=== Geology ===
Beneath the drift deposits of the Vale of York lie Triassic sandstone and mudstone, and lower Jurassic mudstone but these are completely masked by the surface deposits. These deposits include glacial till, sand and gravel and both terminal and recessional moraines left by receding ice sheets at the end of the last ice age. The Escrick moraine extends across the vale from west to east and the York moraine, 8 miles further north, forms a similar curving ridge from York eastwards to Sand Hutton. To the north of these ridges are deposits of clay, sand and gravel left by a glacial lake. There are also areas of river alluvium consisting of clay, silt and sand deposited by the main rivers and streams.

=== Drainage ===
The Vale of York is drained southwards by the River Ouse and its tributaries, the Ure, the Nidd and the Foss. To the east of the area the River Derwent drains southwards into the Ouse. There are also frequent stream courses and drainage channels which link with the main rivers crossing the vale. Many of these watercourses are maintained and managed by local internal drainage boards to ensure sustainable water levels are kept across the vale.

== Natural history ==
The landscape is generally low-lying and flat although minor ridges and glacial moraines provide some variations in topography. Where there are dry sandy soils there are remnants of historic heathlands and ancient semi natural woodlands. There are some large areas of conifer plantation, mainly Scots Pine, on the infertile sandy areas.

Arable fields dominate the land cover of the area and grasslands are infrequent. There are very few flood meadows left along the river valleys although some significant areas remain on the lower reaches of the River Derwent.

== History ==
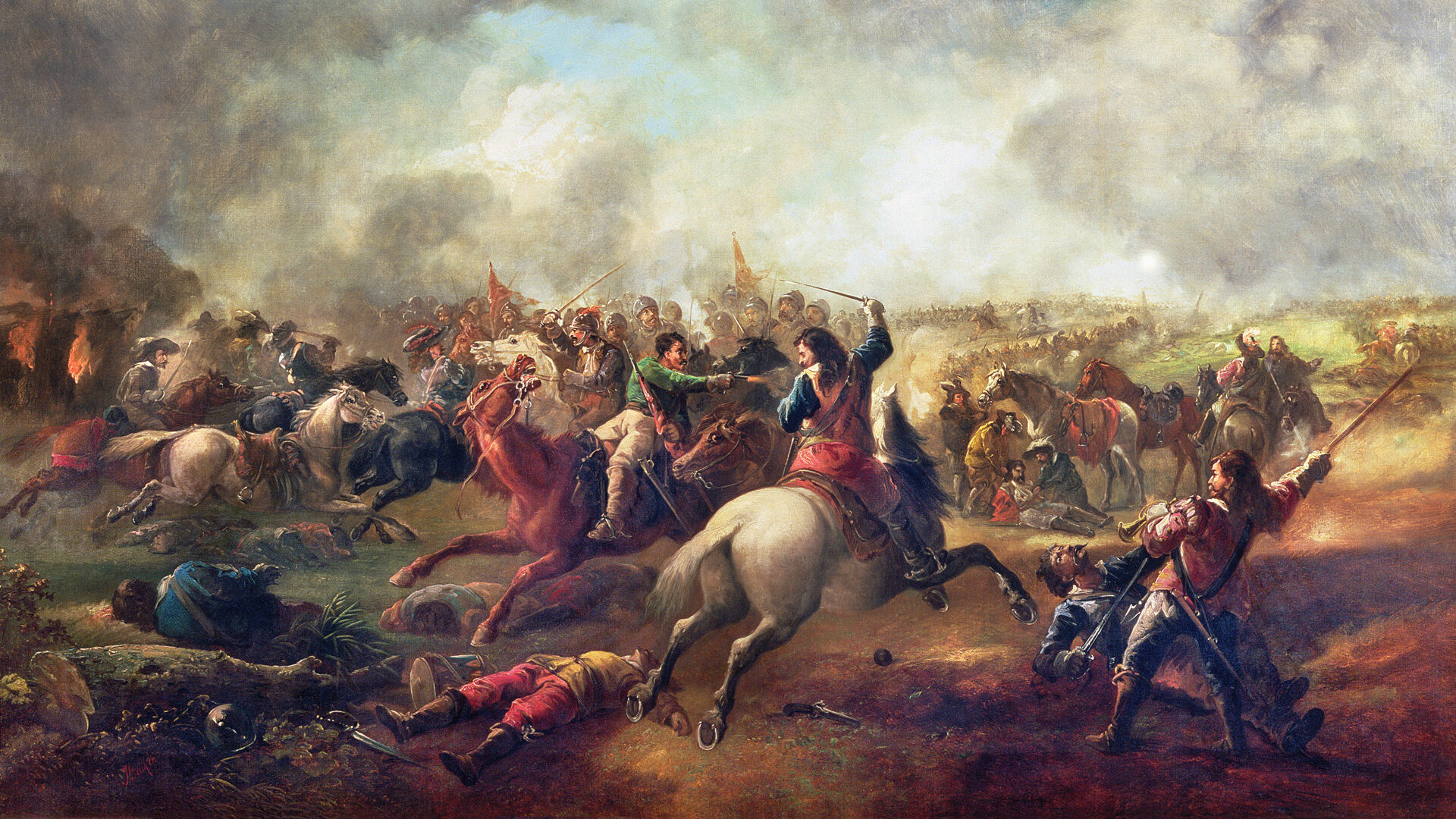
The Battle of Marston Moor

The drier land in the Vale of York, away from the river valleys, would have been extensively cleared for pastoral farming and small scale cropping before the Roman era. The area around York was significantly influenced by the Romans who established their legionary fortress of Eboracum there. There is evidence of villas, forts, signal stations and roads constructed by them.

The vale suffered badly from the Harrying of the North when King William I devastated the northern counties of England to punish the population for their resistance to his conquest. Later, in the English Medieval period, manors and villages were established with open fields, some of which survived until the inclosure acts of the 18th century. During the English Civil War, between Royalists and Parliamentarians, the Battle of Marston Moor was fought on land to the west of York.

== Economy ==
The soils, formed from glacial till, sand and gravel are generally fertile and nearly all the land is in arable use growing large areas of wheat, sugar beet and potatoes. There is a steady move away from livestock rearing and dairy farming.

The city of York tends to dominate the vale economically and is a centre for tourism, retail, commerce, light engineering and food processing. The University of York and its associated science park are also major economic assets.

== Transport ==
The A1 and A19 trunk roads pass through the vale carrying traffic in a north–south direction and a number of other major roads radiate from York. The East Coast Main Line railway connecting London with Edinburgh traverses the vale from north to south and there are a number of east–west rail links to Leeds, Harrogate and Scarborough.

== Places of interest ==
=== Settlements ===
The largest settlement in the vale, apart from York, is Haxby. Other villages typically exhibit a linear form with houses of mottled pink brick and pantiled roofs facing each other on either side of a main street.
