= Langbaurgh =

Langbaurgh (/ˈlæŋbɑːrθ/) may refer to

- Langbaurgh, North Yorkshire, a hamlet near Great Ayton, North Yorkshire, England
- Langbaurgh (district), a local government district in Cleveland, England from 1974 to 1988, renamed Langbaurgh-on-Tees from 1988 to 1996
- Langbaurgh Wapentake, a historic subdivision of the North Riding of Yorkshire, England
  - Langbaurgh East
  - Langbaurgh West
- Langbaurgh (UK Parliament constituency), from 1983 to 1997

== See also ==
- Langbaurgh Ridge
