= Langbaurgh West =

Ancient division of the North Riding, Yorkshire, England

- Wapentake
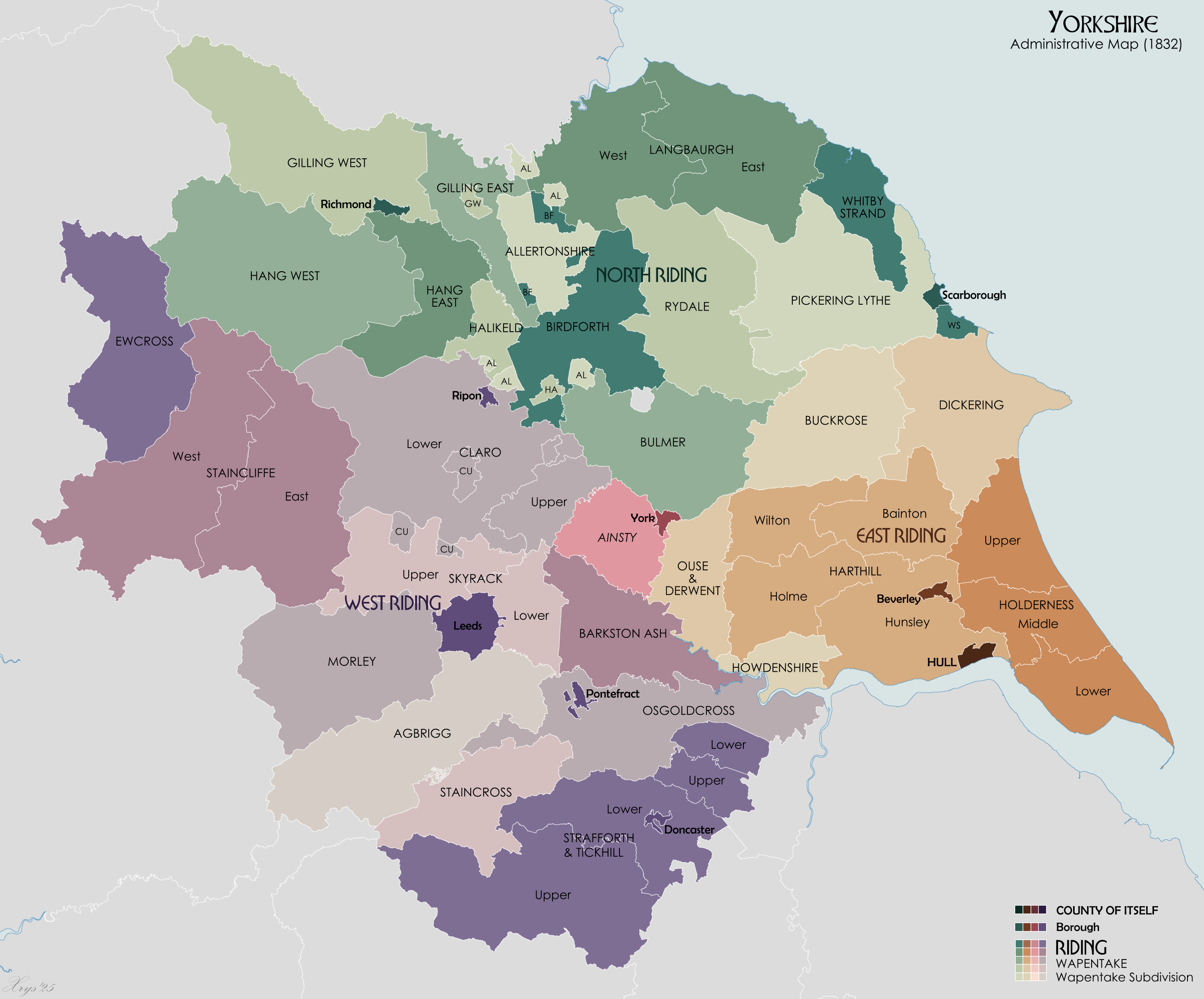
- Wapentakes of North Yorkshire. Langbaurgh West is a dark green colour on the top centre.
- History
  - Preceded by: Langbaurgh Wapentake

Langbaurgh West was a division of the wapentake of Langbaurgh in the North Riding of the ancient county of Yorkshire. The area along with Langbaurgh East forms the Anglo-Saxon baronial Liberty of Cleveland (not to be confused with the later County of Cleveland of 1974 to 1996) and roughly covers the modern districts of Middlesbrough, the western, urbanised portion of Redcar & Cleveland, the southern portion of Stockton-on-Tees, the northern parts of Hambleton (Great Ayton, Stokesley) and the northern parts of the Borough of Scarborough.

From the most northwesterly point, the West Wapentake's approximate boundary started from Yarm across to Eston (and the modern Grangetown area), following south the boundary of Lanbaurgh East, then southwest past Stokesley and back up to Craven and Yarm.

== Modern administration ==
The West Wapentake covered roughly the area of modern-day: Middlesbrough; Hambleton District of North Yorkshire County (Northern parts); Borough of Stockton-on-Tees (Southern parts) councils.

Some of the places listed below are settlements within the former wapentake of Langbaugh West that have since disappeared, merged with other areas, split from or lessened in importance since the wapentake was divided into what is present day borough and county councils:

=== North Yorkshire County’s Hambleton District ===
- Appleton Wiske
- Ingleby Arncliffe
- Great Ayton
- Little Ayton
- Carlton
- Crathorne
- Ingleby Greenhow
- Kildale
- Kirkby
- Newton under Roseberry
- Rudby
- Seamer
- Stokesley
- Whorlton

=== Borough of Middlesbrough ===
- Acklam
- Marton
- Ormesby(part)
- Stainsby
- Stainton
- Thornton
- Tollesby

=== Borough of Redcar & Cleveland (Western part only) ===
- Eston
- Grangetown
- Normanby
- Ormesby
- Teesville

=== Borough of Stockton-on-Tees ===
- Hilton
- Ingleby Barwick
- Kirkleavington
- Maltby
- Thornaby
- Yarm
