= Drummer Hill Farm =

Farm in North Yorkshire, England

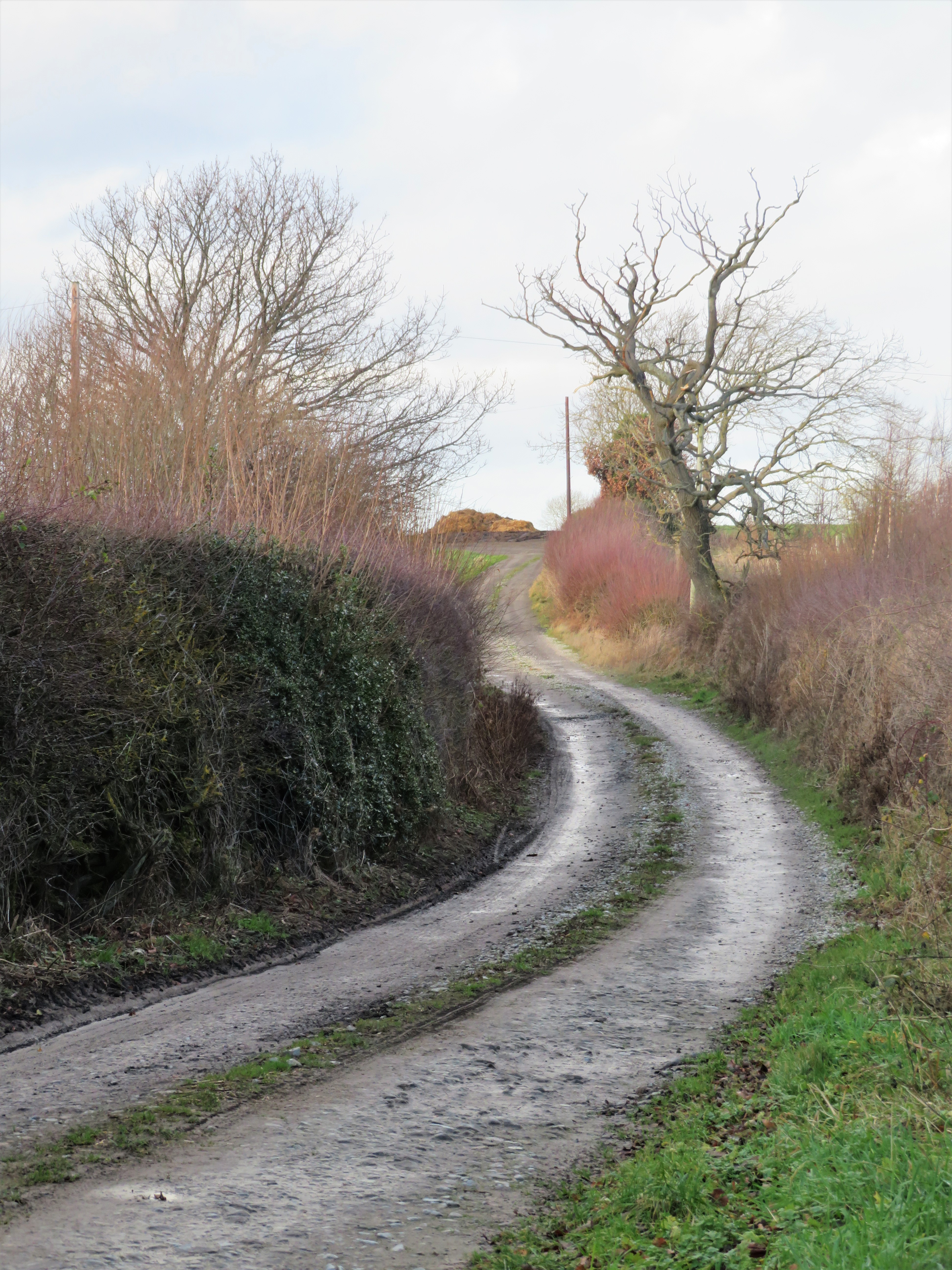
- The track to Drummer Hill Farm, with buildings visible in the distance

General information
- Status: Intact
- Architectural style: Vernacular agricultural
- Location: Ingleby Greenhow, North Yorkshire, England, Drummer Hill Farm, Ingleby Greenhow, TS9 6RL
- Coordinates: 54°27′37″N 1°07′21″W
- Construction started: Early 19th century
- Completed: Mid-19th century
- Owner: Private

Height
- Roof: Pantile with stone ridge and coping

Technical details
- Structural system: Masonry (stone and red brick)

Listed Building – Grade II*
- Official name: Barn with engine house and attached cart lodge with loft over, at north-west end of Drummer Hill Farmhouse
- Designated: 3 December 1990
- Reference no.: 1294490

Drummer Hill Farm is a farmsteading near Ingleby Greenhow in North Yorkshire, England. A mid-19th-century horse engine house, barn, and attached cart lodge at the farm were designated a Grade II* listed building on 3 December 1990.

== History ==
The steading at Drummer Hill was built in the early 19th century. The early 19th-century cart lodge initially contained an upper granary, which was later converted into a hay loft. In the mid-19th century, a horse-powered engine house was added to the main barn to operate mechanical threshing machinery.

Historians Marie Hartley and Joan Ingilby highlighted the engine house in their 1990 survey of the region as an example of a horse wheel house retaining its original internal machinery in situ. The range received Grade II* listed status later that year.

In May 2023, 66-acre (27 ha) of agricultural land and modern farm buildings associated with Drummer Hill Farm were put up for sale by land agents Robin Jessop with a guide price of £850,000.

== Architecture ==
=== Barn and cart lodge ===
The farm range is built from local sandstone ashlar and coursed rubble, with red brick interior linings and pantile roofs with stone copings.

The main barn has a three-bay layout, double timber barn doors under flat stone arches, ventilation slits, and upper pitch holes. Attached to the north-west end is a two-storey cart lodge with open segmental arches on the ground floor and an upper loft reached by an external stone staircase.

=== Horse engine house ===
A semi-circular, single-storey horse engine house (locally called a gin gang) extends from the north side of the main barn. It is constructed with stone piers supporting a conical pantile roof. The open-sided structure allowed horses to walk in a circle to turn an internal vertical axle.

The interior retains its 19th-century timber gear wheel and drive shaft, which passes through the barn wall to connect to the threshing mechanism inside.

== See also ==
- Grade II* listed buildings in North Yorkshire (district)
- Listed buildings in Ingleby Greenhow
