= Easby Moor =

Hill in North Yorkshire, England

Coordinates: 54.483271°N 1.090097°W

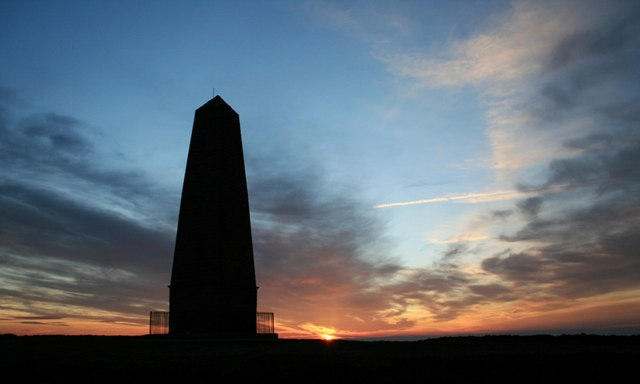
- Captain Cook's monument on Easby Moor

Highest point
- Elevation: 324 m (1,063 ft)
- Prominence: 104 m (341 ft)

Geography
- Location: North York Moors, England
- Parent range: Cleveland Hills
- OS grid: NZ590101
- Topo map: OS Landranger 93

Easby Moor is a hill located in the civil parish of Little Ayton in the North York Moors national park within the Cleveland Hills, North Yorkshire, England. At the peak, 324 metres (1,063 ft) above sea level, is a monument to Captain James Cook, who was native to the area. The Cleveland Way runs over the moor. The moor overlooks the villages of Easby and Great Ayton and Little Ayton.

== Air crash ==
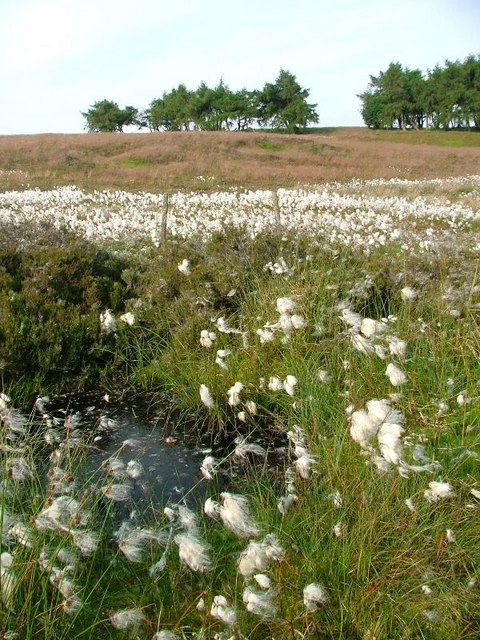
Aircraft crash site

The moor was the scene of an air crash during the Second World War. At 4:10 a.m. on 11 February 1940, a Hudson aircraft took off from Thornaby airfield, to search for German minesweepers operating off the Danish coast. Five minutes later the plane crashed on Easby Moor, killing three of the four crewmen and injuring the fourth. As ice had formed on the wings, the aircraft failed to gain sufficient height to clear the hill. The aircraft ploughed through a larch plantation before coming to rest. The gap in the plantation corresponds exactly with the Hudson's wingspan of 65.5 feet.

The aircrew who died were Flying Officer Tom Parker, Sergeant Harold Berksley and Corporal Norman Drury. Leading Aircraftman Athol Barker survived but was later shot down whilst flying over Germany. The four unexploded bombs that the Hudson carried were later detonated by the RAF, resulting in a pond.

== Captain Cook's Monument ==
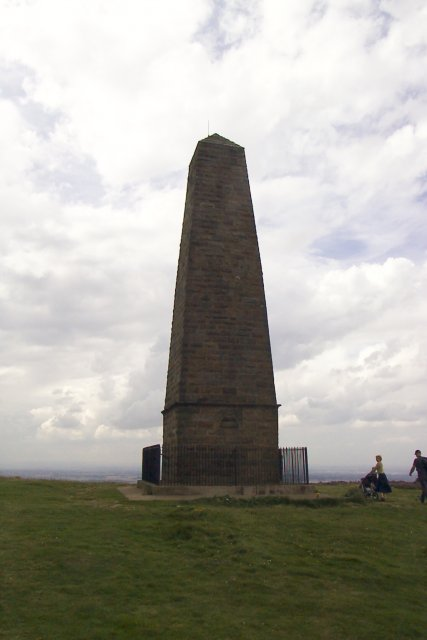
Captain Cook's Monument

Erected on Easby Moor in 1827 by Robert Campion, a Whitby banker, the 60 ft (18 m) high monument bears a plaque with the following inscription:

In memory of the celebrated circumnavigator Captain James Cook F.R.S. A man of nautical knowledge inferior to none, in zeal prudence and energy, superior to most. Regardless of danger he opened an intercourse with the Friendly Isles and other parts of the Southern Hemisphere. He was born at Marton Oct. 27th 1728 and massacred at Owytee Feb. 14th 1779 to the inexpressible grief of his countrymen. While the art of navigation shall be cultivated among men, whilst the spirit of enterprise, commerce and philanthropy shall animate the sons of Britain, while it shall be deemed the honour of a Christian Nation to spread civilisation and the blessings of the Christian faith among pagan and savage tribes, so long will the name of Captain Cook stand out amongst the most celebrated and most admired benefactors of the human race.

This inscription was added later and written by George Young, a Presbyterian minister also from Whitby. Young died in 1848 so the current inscription must have been placed on the monument between 1827 and 1848. Campion died in 1866 so would have approved the new inscription. The original inscription read:

The foundation stone of this Monument was laid by Robert Campion esq of Whitby lord of the manor of Easby on the 12th day of July 1827 being his birthday in commemoration of that celebrated circumnavigator Captain James Cook who was born at Naston (sic) in the neighbourhood October 27 1728 and who served his apprenticeship to sea from Whitby

=== Restoration ===
In 1895 after a campaign by the North-Eastern Daily Gazette the monument was fully restored by repointing and the fitting of a lightning conductor. The monument's lightning conductor was stolen, and in 1960 the monument was struck by lightning occasioning severe damage, splitting it the height of the stonework. Work was quickly carried out to restore the monument.

== See also ==
- Listed buildings in Easby, Hambleton
