= Great Ayton Quaker Meeting House =

Building in Great Ayton, North Yorkshire, England

Coordinates: 54.4879°N 1.1322°W

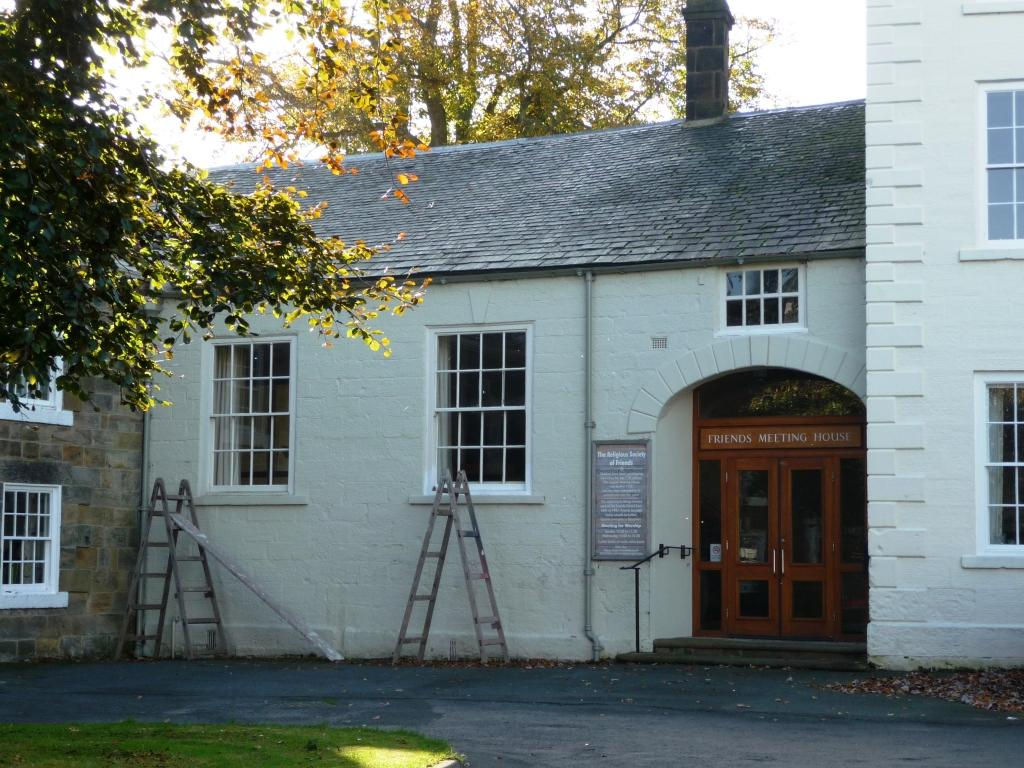
The building, in 2010

Great Ayton Quaker Meeting House is a historic religious building in Great Ayton, a village in North Yorkshire, in England.

The first Quaker meeting in Great Ayton was established in 1698, and in 1700 the worshippers purchased a house to use for meetings. By 1721, it had been demolished and replaced with a purpose-built meeting house, its garden converted into a burial ground. In 1841, the Great Ayton Friends' School was established next door. In 1967, the meeting house was extended to the east, to add a performance space, and the internal partitions were removed. The building was refurbished in 2001, with an upper floor inserted at the west end. The building has been grade II listed since 1969.

The building is constructed of sandstone and red brick, and has a hipped Lakeland slate roof. There is a single storey and a rectangular plan. On the right of the north front is an elliptical arch containing a recessed entrance, and sash windows. The south front contains various openings, including sash windows, and at the east end is a weatherboarded extension.

Quaker meetings are still held here every Sunday and Wednesday.

== See also ==
- Listed buildings in Great Ayton
