= Ayton Hall =

House in Great Ayton, North Yorkshire, England

Coordinates: 54°29′23″N 1°08′39″W

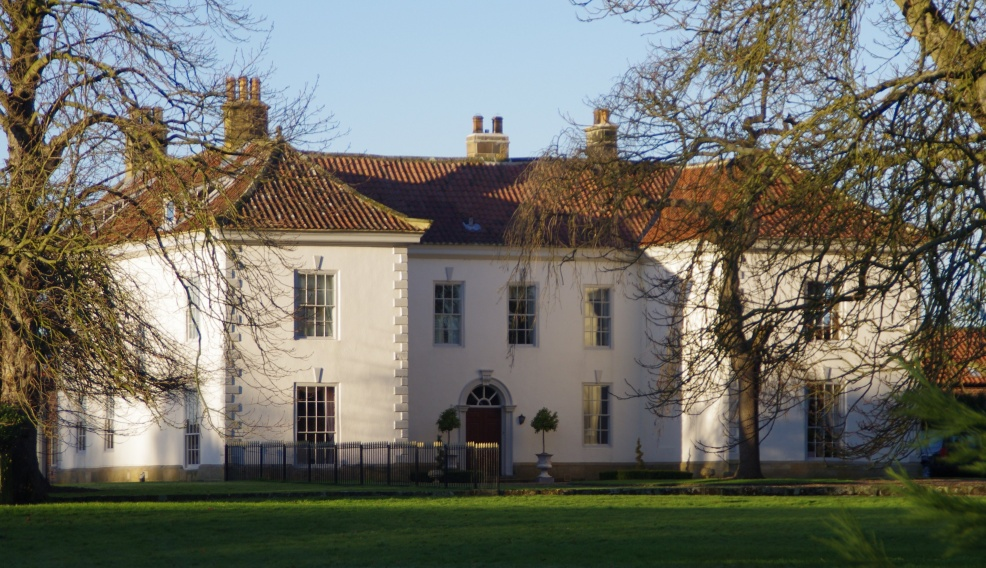
The building, in 2013

Ayton Hall is a historic building in Great Ayton, a village in North Yorkshire, in England.

The hall was first recorded in the 1280s, when it was owned by the Earl of Westmorland. The current house was built in about 1690, and it was altered and extended over the ensuing centuries. Much of the interior dates from the 18th and 19th centuries. In the late 20th century, the hall served as a hotel. It was grade II* listed in 1966.

The hall has rendered walls, a stone plinth, a deep eaves cornice, and pantile roofs with stone copings and kneelers; the roofs on the wings are hipped with ball finials. There are two storeys and a U-shaped plan, consisting of a main range of four bays, projecting single-bay wings, and a rear wing. In the centre is a doorway with pilasters, impost blocks, a radial fanlight, and an archivolt with a keystone on consoles. The windows are sashes with keystones. The rear wing is in brick and stone and has two storeys and four wide bays. It contains a doorway with a chamfered surround, and door with a flattened Tudor arched head.

== See also ==
- Grade II* listed buildings in North Yorkshire (district)
- Listed buildings in Great Ayton
