= Listed buildings in Great Ayton =

Great Ayton is a civil parish in the county of North Yorkshire, England. It contains 64 listed buildings that are recorded in the National Heritage List for England. Of these, one is listed at Grade I, the highest of the three grades, one is at Grade II*, the middle grade, and the others are at Grade II, the lowest grade. The parish contains the village of Great Ayton, the smaller settlement of Langbaurgh, and the surrounding countryside and moorland. Most of the listed buildings are houses, cottages and associated structures, farmhouses and farm buildings. The others include churches and items in a churchyard, a former chapel, a shooting box, boundary stones, schools, a police station, a memorial and a telephone kiosk.

== Key ==
Grade	Criteria
I	Buildings of exceptional interest, sometimes considered to be internationally important
II*	Particularly important buildings of more than special interest
II	Buildings of national importance and special interest

== Buildings ==
Name and location	Photograph	Date	Notes	Grade
All Saints' Church; 54.48974°N 1.14300°W		12th century	The church has been altered and extended through the centuries. It is built in sandstone with a green slate roof, and consists of a nave with a south porch, and a lower narrower chancel with a north vestry. The nave has an eaves corbel table with various carvings. The porch has a stone coped gable on sloped footstones, a stepped plinth, and a wide shouldered arch, and within are side benches. The inner doorway is Norman, and has two orders, the inner with roll-moulding and the outer with chevrons, and shafts on plinths with worn capitals. The blocked north doorway is also Norman.	I
Hope Cottage; 54.48775°N 1.13345°W	—	Late 17th century	A house, divided into two, in stone, the upper part in pinkish-yellow brick, with a stepped eaves cornice, and a pantile roof with stone copings. There are two storeys and six bays, and a single-storey rear extension. The doorway and the windows, which are casements, have alternating block surrounds.	II
Ayton Hall; 54.48987°N 1.14413°W		c. 1690	A large house, later a hotel, with rendered walls, a stone plinth, a deep eaves cornice, and pantile roofs with stone copings and kneelers; the roofs on the wings are hipped with ball finials. There are two storeys and a U-shaped plan, consisting of a main range of four bays, projecting single-bay wings, and a rear wing. In the centre is a doorway with pilasters, impost blocks, a radial fanlight, and an archivolt with a keystone on consoles. The windows are sashes with keystones. The rear wing is in brick and stone and has two storeys and four wide bays. It contains a doorway with a chamfered surround, and door with a flattened Tudor arched head.	II*
Langton House and outbuilding 54.48858°N 1.14219°W	—	c. 1700	The house is in rendered brick, with stone dressings, a moulded eaves cornice, sprocketed eaves, and a pantile roof with stone copings, kneelers, and a stepped pointed finial on the left kneeler. There are two storeys and three wide bays. The doorway is in the centre, to its right is a square bay window, to the left is a tripartite window, and the upper floor contains horizontally-sliding sashes. The outbuilding to the left is in stone, and has two storeys and two bays. In the left bay is a segmental carriage archway with impost blocks and a keystone.	II
The Royal Oak Hotel; 54.48850°N 1.13284°W		1721	The hotel, which was extended in the early 19th century, is in colourwashed stone, and has a roof of clay tile and a terracotta ridge. The main block has two storeys and an attic, two wide bays and a mansard roof, and the extension to the left is lower with two storeys and two bays. In the centre of the main block is a prostyle porch with an entablature flanked by canted bay windows. In the upper floor are sash windows in architraves and between them is a dated and inscribed sundial. The roof contains two large dormers. In the extension is a bay window with a doorway to the left and sash windows above.	II
11, 12 and 12A High Green; 54.48784°N 1.13390°W	—	Early 18th century	A house, later a terrace of small houses, in stone with a pantile roof, and a square kneeler and coping on the left. There are two storeys and four irregular bays. On the front are doorways and casement windows.	II
Acorn; 54.48814°N 1.13227°W	—	Early 18th century	A house in yellowish-brown brick on a stone plinth, with stone dressings and a pantile roof. There are two storeys and two bays. In the centre is a doorway with alternating block jambs and a plain lintel. The windows are sashes with flat gauged brick arches and keystones, and projecting stone sills.	II
Farm buildings north of Ayton Hall; 54.49013°N 1.14404°W	—	Early 18th century	The farm buildings and stables are in brick with stone dressings, moulded brick eaves, and roofs of pantile and metal sheet, with stone coped gables and kneelers. There are two storeys and four ranges around a courtyard. In the main range is a round-arched entrance with a keystone, doorways, windows and loft openings. On the roof is an octagonal cupola with a bell, a canted lead roof and a weathervane.	II
Gazebo northwest of Ayton Hall; 54.48989°N 1.14432°W	—	Early 18th century	The gazebo is a small square building in brick, with a stepped eaves cornice, and a swept pyramidal pantile roof with angle copings, prominent moulded diagonal kneelers, and a ball finial. On the north side is a flight of steps with a ramped wall leading up to a doorway with a small side light. On the west side is a sash window.	II
Captain Cook's Schoolroom; 54.48863°N 1.13444°W		Early 18th century	A pair of houses and a cottage on the left, the cottage at one time a schoolroom for Captain Cook, all the buildings later used for other purposes. They are in sandstone on a plinth, with swept pantile roofs and stone copings, and two storeys. The former cottage has three bays, on the front is a shop window and an inscribed bronze plaque, and at the rear are external steps to a doorway and an inscribed plaque. The two houses have four bays, and contain a doorway with a plain surround. The windows in all parts are horizontally-sliding sashes.	II
Ivy Cottage and Nutshell; 54.48802°N 1.13221°W	—	Early 18th century	A house and a cottage in sandstone, with a moulded eaves cornice, and a swept pantile roof with stone copings and square kneelers. There are two storeys and attics, and three bays. The doorways have plain surrounds, the windows are sashes, two with raised alternating block surrounds, and there are three dormers.	II
Garden wall north of Manor House; 54.48863°N 1.14582°W	—	Early 18th century (probable)	The boundary wall to the north of the garden and yard is in sandstone with chamfered coping. In the centre is a pair of square gate piers with five-stepped tops.	II
Quaker Meeting House; 54.48791°N 1.13226°W		Early 18th century	The meeting house, which was extended in 1967, is in sandstone and red brick, and has a hipped Lakeland slate roof. There is a single storey and a rectangular plan. On the right of the north front is an elliptical arch containing a recessed entrance, and sash windows. The south front contains various openings, including sash windows, and at the east end is a weatherboarded extension.	II
Orchard House; 54.48769°N 1.13379°W	—	Early 18th century	The house is in brick and stone, it is colourwashed, and has a pantile roof with stone coping and a square kneeler on the left gable. The doorway has pilasters and an entablature. To its left is a square bay window, above which is a tripartite window, and to the right is a two-light window with a segmental head.	II
Winley Hill Farmhouse and wall 54.47744°N 1.16891°W	—	Early 18th century	The farmhouse is in pinkish brick, with stepped eaves courses, and a tile roof with stone copings and kneelers. There are two storeys and four bays.. The windows are small-paned casements with gauged brick arches, keystones and stone sills. The garden walls have stone gabled coping.	II
7 Low Green; 54.48896°N 1.14265°W		1730	The house is in stone with a Welsh slate roof. There are two storeys and five bays, and a rear wing on the left. The right bay contains a round-arched wagon entrance. In the centre of the other bays is a doorway, and the windows are sashes, those in the ground floor with keyed lintels.	II
Farm buildings and walls southwest of Airyholme Farmhouse; 54.49631°N 1.10784°W		Early to mid 18th century	The barn and byre are in sandstone and have pantile roofs with stone copings and square kneelers. The buildings are in two parts, one higher, each with two bays. The openings include doorways and a stable door, and in the gable ends are owl and pigeon holes and a loading door. Attached to the buildings are various walls, including one enclosing a garden.	II
Outbuilding east of Manor House; 54.48865°N 1.14526°W	—	Early to mid 18th century	A former coach house, stable and byre with living accommodation, in red brick with stone dressings, partly on a stone plinth, with quoins, and a pantile roof hipped on the right. There is a single storey and an L-shaped plan. The building contains varied doors and windows, some with alternate block surrounds and others with flat brick arches.	II
5 Levenside; 54.48860°N 1.14245°W	—	18th century	Two houses combined into one, in sandstone, with a pantile roof, stone coping and a square kneeler. There are two storeys and three irregular bays. One doorway has a shouldered lintel, and the other doorway is blocked. The windows are sashes, those in the upper floor horizontally-sliding.	II
Wall, gates, piers and fences, All Saints' Church; 54.48962°N 1.14340°W		18th century (probable)	The wall enclosing the churchyard is in sandstone with sloped coping, and has a roughly rectangular plan. At the southeast corner are single and double wooden gates with plain monolith stone piers. These are flanked by fencing, on which is an inscribed plaque.	II
Archway Cottage; 54.48819°N 1.13413°W	—	18th century	The house is in stone, with a pantile roof, two storeys and four bays. In the second bay is a segmental carriage arch with a keystone. The windows in the left bay are sashes, and elsewhere they are top-pivoted casements.	II
Cook Headstone; 54.48976°N 1.14277°W		Mid 18th century	The headstone is in the churchyard of All Saints' Church, to the east of the church, and commemorates members of the family of Captain Cook. It is in sandstone, and has a shaped top with a central medallion containing a primitive winged angel head, flanked by leafy scrolls. There are inscriptions on the front and the rear.	II
Langbaurgh Cottage and barn 54.49773°N 1.13964°W	—	Mid 18th century	The house is in rendered brick, and has a pantile roof with stone gable copings and kneelers. There are two storeys and five bays, and a single-storey extension to the west. The house contains a doorway with a fanlight, and the windows are horizontally-sliding sashes. The barn forms an L-shaped plan, and has two storeys and four bays. It contains windows, and on the north return are external stone stairs to a doorway.	II
Barn north of Langbaurgh Cottage; 54.49792°N 1.13961°W	—	Mid 18th century	A threshing barn in stone, with a pantile roof, stone copings and square kneelers. There are three bays, and the barn contains opposed central wagon doors, the south one with a segmental arch, raised voussoirs, impost blocks and a keystone, loading doors and vents.	II
Barn and sheds west of Langbaurgh Farm; 54.49660°N 1.13891°W	—	Mid 18th century	The threshing barn and sheds are in stone with some brick, and a pantile roof with stone copings and square kneelers. The buildings form an L-shaped plan with a main range of three bays. It contains opposed central wagon doors, one with a segmental arch, raised voussoirs, impost blocks and a keystone, above which are loading doors. The other openings include doorways, windows and vents.	II
Manor House; 54.48857°N 1.14570°W	—	Mid 18th century	The house is rendered, and has a pantile roof with stone copings. There are two storeys, two bays, and a lower single-bay extension on the right. The doorway has a fanlight and side lights, and the windows are tripartite sashes. At the rear is a stair Venetian window.	II
Gate piers and garden walls, Manor House; 54.48830°N 1.14527°W	—	18th century	Flanking the entrance to the drive is a pair of rusticated stone gate piers, each with a plinth, a cornice, and a ball finial on a swept base. There is a similar, smaller pair of piers nearer the house. The older of the walls enclosing the garden is in pinkish brick with flat stone coping, and it contains a round-arched gateway. The later wall is in stone with sloped coping.	II
Seaton House; 54.48710°N 1.12927°W	—	Mid 18th century (probable)	The house is in sandstone, and has a pantile roof with a stone ridge, copings and kneelers. There are two storeys and two bays. The central doorway has pilasters, a fanlight and a bracketed cornice hood, and the windows are sashes with extended lintels and keystones.	II
The White House and walls 54.49071°N 1.11043°W		Mid 18th century	The house, which was later extended, is in painted roughcast, and has pantile roofs with coped gables and moulded kneelers. There are two storeys, the main block has two bays, with recessed two bays recessed at the left and one bay recessed on the right. On the right is a projecting porch hood with decorative bargeboards on a chamfered wood post. The windows are sashes, those in the ground floor with keystones. To the south is a conservatory with curved bargeboards and a finial. Also to the south is a stone wall with a fence, and coped and ramped side walls. In front of the house is a stone plinth with wooden fencing, containing round-topped gate piers.	II
Crown Cottage and Marwood Cottage; 54.48944°N 1.14167°W	—	Mid to late 18th century	A pair of cottages in pinkish brick, Marwood Cottage painted, with a pantile roof. There are two storeys, and each cottage has three bays. The doorways have fanlights, and the windows are horizontally-sliding sashes.	II
Former Congregational chapel 54.48882°N 1.13991°W	—	1769	The former chapel is in sandstone, and has a pantile roof with stone copings and kneelers. In the north, east and south faces are round-arched sash windows with voussoirs and radial heads, and there is a small inserted doorway.	II
39–43 Bridge Street; 54.48825°N 1.14146°W	—	Late 18th century	Three stone houses, with pantile roofs, and stone copings and kneelers on the right. There are two storeys and four bays, the left bay lower. In the second bay is an arched cart entrance, inside which is a doorway, The other doorways are on the front, and the windows are sashes.	II
63 High Street and wall 54.48888°N 1.13843°W	—	Late 18th century	The house is in sandstone, and has a slate roof with stone copings and kneelers. There are two storeys and two wide bays. The central doorway has a lintel with a keystone, and the windows are a mix of sashes and casements, all with keystones. In front is a low stone wall with four central steps and wrought iron handrails.	II
13 and 15 Station Road; 54.48813°N 1.13098°W		Late 18th century	A cottage and a workshop in sandstone, with a pantile roof, stone gable copings and square kneelers. There are two storeys and four bays. On the front are two doorways, to the right is a large window with an elliptical head and voussoirs, and the other windows on the front are sashes in architraves. Also on the front is a large inscribed wooden signboard with a curved head, and on the right return is a square oriel window.	II
Airyholme Farmhouse and outbuilding 54.49649°N 1.10761°W		Late 18th century	The farmhouse and outbuilding are in sandstone. The house has a Welsh slate roof with a tile ridge, and stone coping and kneelers. There are two storeys and the house is in two parts. The left part is taller, with three bays, and it contains a doorway with a fanlight, and a frieze with paterae, and the right part has two bays. In both parts most windows are sashes, in the right part is a casement window, and at the rear is a round-headed stair window. The outbuilding to the southeast has a pantile roof with moulded eaves, stone coping and block kneelers, and it contains a stable door.	II
The Shooting Box at Roseberry Topping; 54.50289°N 1.1101°W		Late 18th century	The shooting box is in stone on a plinth, with a moulded eaves cornice, and an ogee dome with a ball finial, There is a single storey and a square plan. The west front contains a doorway, and each of the other fronts has a window.	II
Beech Grove; 54.48905°N 1.13768°W	—	1779	The house is in stone, and has a Lakeland slate roof with stone copings and kneelers. There are two storeys and four bays. The doorway has pilasters, an entablature and a fanlight. To its left is a canted bay window with pilasters, an entablature and a blocking course, and the other windows are sashes in architraves with keystones, one dated.	II
East Central Building, Friends' School; 54.48789°N 1.13253°W		c. 1800	The house, at one time a school, is in stone on a plinth, with alternating quoins, a moulded eaves cornice, and a Lakeland slate roof with stone gables and kneelers. There are three storeys and attics, and five bays. In the centre is a Roman Doric porch, distyle in antis. The windows are sashes, in the attic are three gabled dormers, and at the rear is a stair Venetian window.	II
2, 4 and 6 Bridge Street, wall and outhouse 54.48880°N 1.14162°W	—	Late 18th to early 19th century	A row of stone houses, partly on a plinth, with pantile roofs, stone coping and kneelers. There are two storeys, and each house has two bays, the left house with a gable. On the front are two doorways, the left with a fanlight, and between them is a passage door. To the right is a canted bay window, and the other windows are sashes. The left house has a canted bay window in the ground floor, above it is a two-light mullioned window and a single light, and in the gable is a small window. At the rear is a round-arched stair window, and a wall leading to an outhouse.	II
8 and 10 Park Square; 54.48899°N 1.13297°W	—	Late 18th to early 19th century	Four houses, later combined into two, in sandstone, with a swept pantile roof, stone copings and moulded kneelers. There are two storeys and four bays. The two doorways have plain surrounds, to the right is a canted bay window, and the other windows are sashes.	II
2 and 3 Race Terrace; 54.48811°N 1.14197°W	—	Late 18th to early 19th century	Two houses in sandstone, each with two storeys and two bays, the left with a Welsh slate roof, the right wider with a pantile roof. Each house has a doorway with a fanlight, sash windows, and stone coping and a kneeler at the left end of the roof.	II
6 and 8 Station Road and wall 54.48795°N 1.13110°W	—	Late 18th to early 19th century	A row of cottages, at one time a school lodge, in sandstone, with a Welsh slate roof and stone gable copings. There are two storeys and six bays. The windows are sashes, most horizontally-sliding. The entrance at the rear has a stone arch, and above it is an outshut.	II
10 and 12 Yarm Lane; 54.48663°N 1.14652°W	—	Late 18th to early 19th century	A farmhouse and a cottage, later two houses, in sandstone, with a pantile roof, and stone gable copings and kneelers. There are two storeys and five bays. Each doorway has pilasters, an entablature and a fanlight, to the right is a canted bay window, and most of the other windows are sashes in architraves.	II
Barn and cartshed north of Winley Hill Farmhouse; 54.47771°N 1.16921°W	—	Late 18th or early 19th century	The barn and cartshed are in stone and brick, and have roofs of concrete tile with stone ridge coping. The barn has an L-shaped plan, and at the south end is a pigsty with a pantile roof and arched feeding chutes. The cartshed to the west has six bays with segmental arches, the arches partly filled.	II
25 and 27 Bridge Street; 54.48854°N 1.14119°W	—	Early 19th century (probable)	A house divided into two, in stone, with a pantile roof and stone coping and a kneeler on the right. There are two storeys and two bays, and a lower two-storey one-bay extension on the left. One doorway has a fanlight, and the windows are sashes in architraves, the window in the extension horizontally-sliding.	II
14–16 High Green; 54.48793°N 1.13394°W		Early 19th century	A terrace of three small stone houses with a moulded eaves cornice and a pantile roof. There are two storeys and each house has one bays. The doorways have fanlights, and the windows are sashes in wooden architraves with stone sills.	II
Entrance gateway, Ayton Hall; 54.48882°N 1.14292°W		Early 19th century (probable)	The entrance is flanked by square rusticated stone gate piers, each on a plinth, with a cornice and a pyramidal finial on a stepped base with a neck. They are flanked by quadrant walls with sloped copings, ending in square piers with flattened pyramidal caps.	II
Boundary stone 54.50408°N 1.08142°W		Early 19th century	The boundary stone consists of a roughly dressed limestone shaft, about 75 centimetres (30 in) high, with sides of about 40 centimetres (16 in) and 37 centimetres (15 in). It is inscribed on the north face with initials and a date.	II
Two boundary stones 54.50366°N 1.08799°W	—	Early 19th century	Each boundary stone consists of a roughly dressed limestone shaft carved with initials and a number or a date.	II
Rosehill and Rosehill Lodge; 54.49002°N 1.13215°W	—	Early 19th century	A house with an extension, later divided into two, in stone, with a moulded eaves cornice, and a Welsh slate roof with stone gable coping. There are two storeys and an L-shaped plan, with a south front of five bays, and a single-storey extension on the left. The doorway has pilasters, an entablature and a patterned fanlight, and the windows are sashes in architraves. The east front has three bays, and contains a similar doorway and windows, and two square bay windows.	II
Wynford House; 54.48938°N 1.14137°W	—	Early 19th century	The house is in sandstone with a pantile roof, two storeys and two bays. The central doorway has pilasters, an entablature and a patterned fanlight. It is flanked by canted bay windows, and in the upper floor are sash windows.	II
Langbaurgh Hall; 54.49745°N 1.13641°W	—	1830	A house in stone, with a plinth band, quoins, a floor band, a cornice and blocking course, and a hipped pantile roof. There are two storeys and a front of three bays. In the centre is a Roman Doric doorcase with pilasters and an entablature, and the windows are sashes in architraves. At the left on the rear is a wing forming an L-shaped plan, and on the left return is a lead pump with the date.	II
Stable block northwest of Langbaurgh Hall; 54.49768°N 1.13667°W	—	c. 1830	The stable and coach house are in sandstone, and have a Welsh slate roof with stone coping and moulded kneelers on the left. There are two storeys and five bays. The building contains two large elliptical-arched carriage entrances, doors, small windows and a central pitching opening. On the roof is a cupola with a clock, and in the left gable end is a loading door. To the left is an extension with a single storey and a loft.	II
1, 2 and 3 High Green; 54.48826°N 1.13232°W	—	Early to mid 19th century	A terrace of three houses in sandstone, with a Welsh slate roof stone coped on the left. There are two storeys and six bays. On the front are three doorways, each with pilasters, an entablature, a fanlight and a bracketed cornice. There are two square bay windows, the other windows are sashes, and in the roof are five gabled dormers.	II
17 and 18 High Green; 54.48807°N 1.13405°W	—	Early to mid 19th century	A pair of houses, one at one time a bank, in stone on a plinth, the left house painted, with a pantile roof, stone copings and curved kneelers. There are two storeys and four bays. The left house has a doorway with a plain surround and a fanlight, and the doorway of the right house has pilasters, a decorative fanlight, and an entablature with a cornice. The windows in both houses are sashes.	II
Wall and stable buildings, Cleveland Lodge; 54.49141°N 1.12606°W	—	Early to mid 19th century	The stable and coach house are in sandstone, and have Welsh slate roofs with stone copings and kneelers. There are two storeys and seven bays., and they contain stable and carriage doors. The attached wall runs a complicated course, and contains four corniced piers, and a pair of plain piers with pyramidal caps. In the north angle are two single-storey buildings, and the stable yard is cobbled, and contains two kennels.	II
West Central Building, Friends' School; 54.48775°N 1.13267°W		1842	The school was designed by John Middleton, and later converted for residential use. It is in stone on a plinth, with sill bands, a bracketed eaves gutter, and a Lakeland slate roof. There are three storeys and six bays. On the right is a doorway with a fanlight, and the windows are sashes, all with segmental heads. In the centre is a raised shaped parapet with a clock face and a date panel, above which is a square bellcote with a ball finial.	II
Cleveland Lodge; 54.49111°N 1.12680°W		1844–45	A large house designed by John Middleton, and extended in 1860 by Alfred Waterhouse. It is in stone on a plinth, with a ground floor frieze and cornice, an upper floor sill band, a modillion eaves course and a blocking course, and a hipped green slate roof. There are two storeys and fronts of five and three bays. On the entrance front is a porch with paired square columns and a doorway with a fanlight. The windows are sashes in architraves, with panels under the ground floor windows. In the garden front is a single-storey bow window, the north return has a bellcote, tripartite windows and a tower, and at the rear is a round-arched stair window. To the east is a three-bay wing with two recessed single-bay extensions.	II
Marwood School; 54.48918°N 1.14199°W		1851	The school and master's house is in sandstone, and has a Welsh slate roof with stone gable copings and carved kneelers. There is a single storey and a U-shaped plan, consisting of a central three -bay range and flanking gabled wings, the right wing part of the master's house. In the left bay of the main range is a Gothic-style porch, and the windows are mullioned and transomed. The left wing contains a larger mullioned and transomed window with a pointed head and a hood mould, and above it is a clock face. In the right return, the entrance to the house has a Tudor arched head, and the windows in the upper floor are in gabled half-dormers with finials.	II
47 and 49 High Street; 54.48907°N 1.13935°W		Late 19th century	A house and a shop in stone, with a deep boarded eaves cornice, and a Welsh slate roof. There are two storeys and an attic, and two bays. On the left is a round-arched doorway with a fanlight, to its right is a double shop front with a central doorway and flanking windows, each with three arched lights and transoms. These are all framed by four part-reeded pilasters with leafy capitals, and a corniced fascia. The upper floor contains a tripartite sash window to the left, to the right is a canted oriel window on console brackets, and in the roof are two pedimented dormers with side pilasters.	II
Christ Church; 54.48995°N 1.14168°W		1876	The church is in sandstone with a Welsh slate roof, and is in Decorated style. It has a cruciform plan, consisting of a nave, a west narthex, north and south aisles, a south porch, a north transept steeple, and a chancel. The steeple has a tower with two stages, angle buttresses, traceried bell openings, and a broach spire with bands of red sandstone and lucarnes.	II
Police Station; 54.48965°N 1.14099°W	—	c. 1903–04	The police station, designed by Walter Brierley, is in sandstone, with shaped eaves brackets, and a Lakeland slate roof with stone gable copings and kneelers. There are two storeys and three bays. At each end is a doorway with a chamfered and alternate-block surround, and a lobed lintel. Above the left door is a royal coat of arms. The windows are mullioned, those in the ground floor also transomed.	II
Captain Cook Memorial; 54.48803°N 1.14137°W		1934	The memorial is on the site of the cottage in which Captain Cook lived during his earlier life, and is in rusticated granite. The stones were taken from Point Hicks, Victoria, Australia, and it is a facsimile of a memorial erected there. The memorial consists of a low obelisk on a base of two square steps, and on the obelisk are two inscribed bronze plaques.	II
Telephone kiosk 54.48835°N 1.13392°W	—	1935	The K6 type telephone kiosk in High Street was designed by Giles Gilbert Scott. Constructed in cast iron with a square plan and a dome, it has three unperforated crowns in the top panels.	II
