= The Royal Oak Hotel, Great Ayton =

Hotel in Great Ayton, North Yorkshire, England

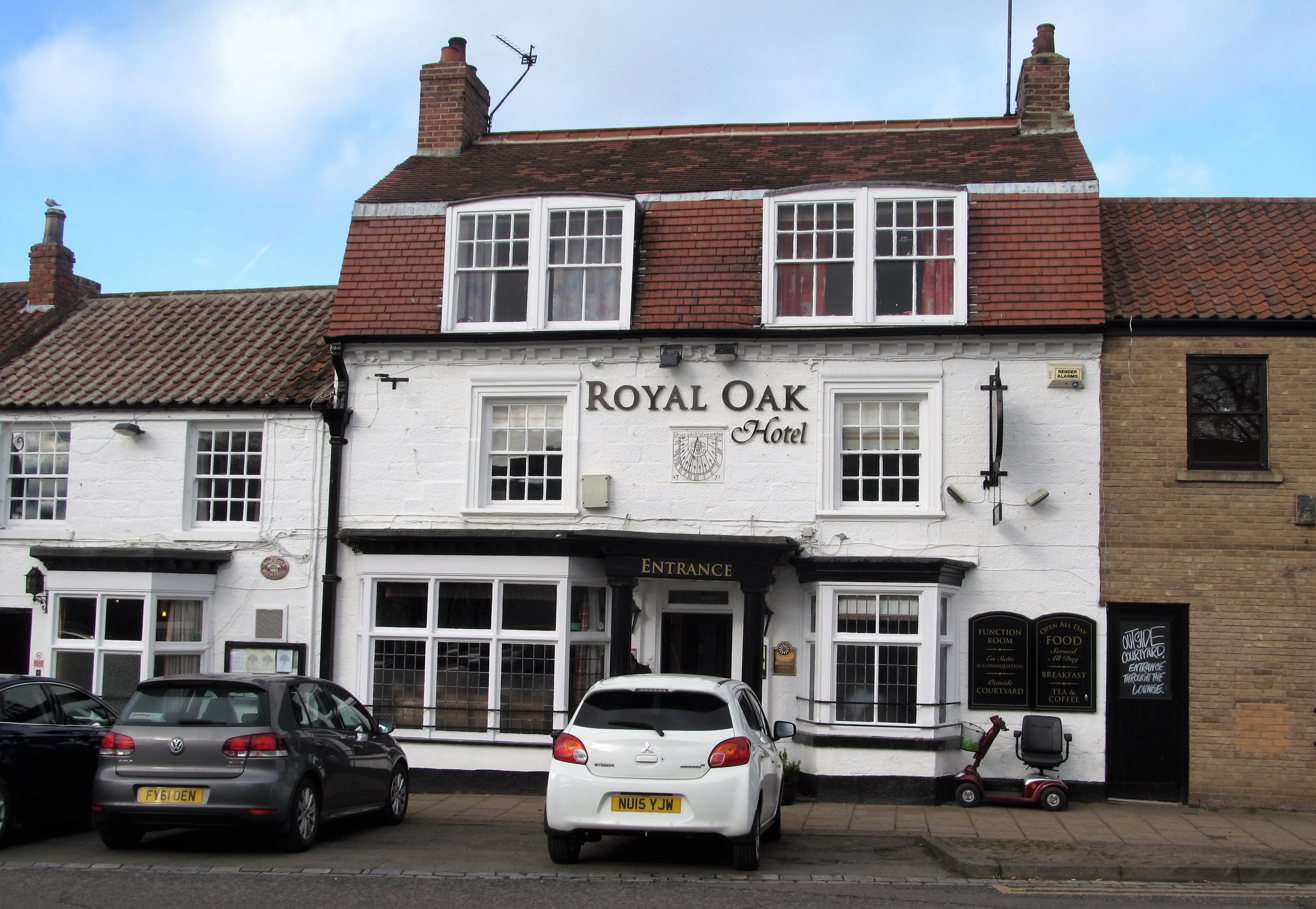
The pub, in 2017

The Royal Oak Hotel is a historic pub in Great Ayton, a village in North Yorkshire, in England.

The hotel was constructed in 1721 as a coaching inn, and was extended in the early 19th century. The pub has log fires and beamed ceilings, and serves food while also providing accommodation. The building was grade II listed in 1989.

The pub is built of colourwashed stone, and has a roof of clay tile and a terracotta ridge. The main block has two storeys and an attic, two wide bays and a mansard roof, and the extension to the left is lower with two storeys and two bays. In the centre of the main block is a prostyle porch with an entablature flanked by canted bay windows. In the upper floor are sash windows in architraves and between them is a dated and inscribed sundial. The roof contains two large dormers. In the extension is a bay window with a doorway to the left and sash windows above.

== See also ==
- Listed buildings in Great Ayton
