= St Andrew's Church, Ingleby Greenhow =

Church in Ingleby Greenhow, North Yorkshire, England

Coordinates: 54.4486°N 1.1057°W

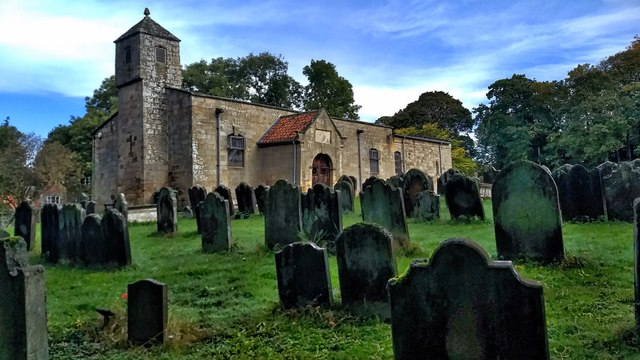
The church, in 2019

St Andrew's Church is a parish church in Ingleby Greenhow, a village in North Yorkshire, in England.

The church was originally built in the late 12th century, from which period the chancel arch, arcade in the nave, and lower part of the tower survive. The chancel was rebuilt in the 13th century, and the remainder of the church was rebuilt in 1741. A vestry was added in 1906, to a design by Temple Moore. The building was grade I listed in 1966.

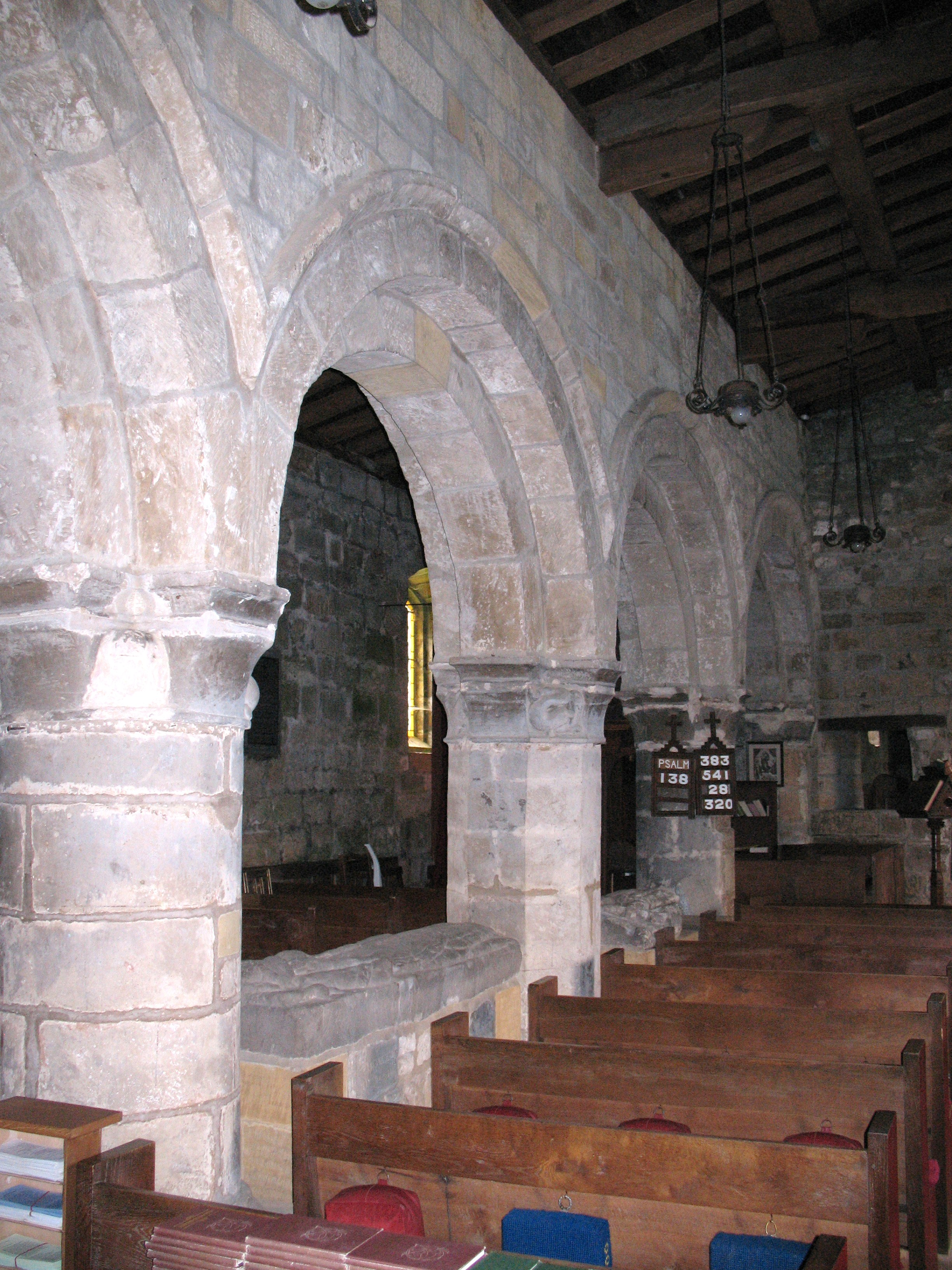
The arcade

The church is built of stone, and consists of a west turret, a nave, a north aisle, a south porch, a chancel and a north vestry. The turret has contains a slit window on the west side, the bell stage is corbelled out on the west side and has louvred bell openings, above which is a coved cornice, and a pyramidal roof with a pyramidal finial. The porch is gabled, and the inner doorway has a round arch with imposts and a keystone. The chancel has a 12th-century door on the south side, while most of the windows date from 1741. Inside, there is an effigy of Willimus Wrelton, a priest who died in about 1300, and one of a knight, which is probably 15th century. There is a 12th-century tub font on what is probably a 13th-century base.

== See also ==
- Grade I listed buildings in North Yorkshire (district)
- Listed buildings in Ingleby Greenhow
