= St Margaret Clitherow's Church, Great Ayton =

Church in Great Ayton, North Yorkshire, England

Coordinates: 54°29′16″N 1°08′31″W

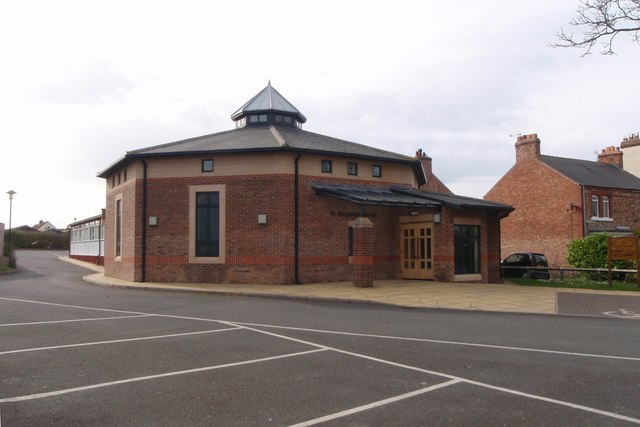
The church, in 2009

St Margaret Clitherow's Church is a Catholic church in Great Ayton, a village in North Yorkshire, in England.

Until the 1960s, Catholics in Great Ayton worshipped at St Joseph's Church, Stokesley. In 1966, a Sunday mass was instituted in the ambulance station in the village. In 1970, a purpose-built timber-framed church was opened on Race Terrace, and in 1971 it was dedicated to Margaret Clitherow, becoming the first church in the world dedicated to the recently canonised saint. In 2002, part of the church was demolished, and a new octagonal building was constructed, the remainder of the old building being retained as a church hall. The new church was designed by DKS Architects and is in red brick with stone details, and a grey tile roof. Two stained glass windows were installed, with designs by Kyme Studios.
