= Langbaurgh Ridge =

Geological site in North Yorkshire, England

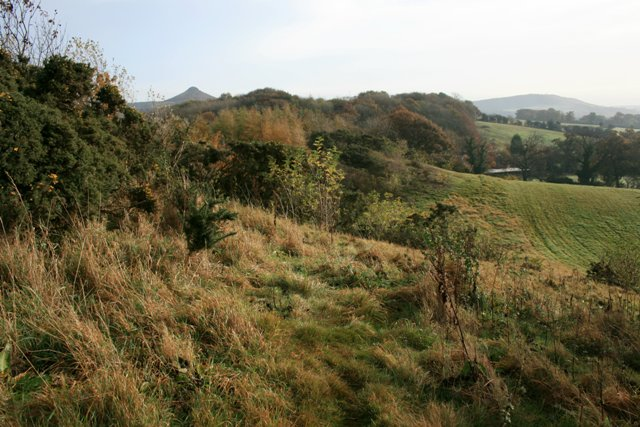

- Location within North Yorkshire
- Location: Redcar and Cleveland and North Yorkshire (district), North Yorkshire, England
- Coordinates: 54°30′5″N 1°8′4″W
- Area: 7.0 ha (17 acres)
- Established: 1986
- Governing body: Natural England
- Website: Map of site

Langbaurgh Ridge (grid reference NZ560121) is an 8.0 hectare geological Site of Special Scientific Interest near the hamlet of Langbaurgh in North Yorkshire, England, notified in 1986. The site crosses the boundary of the Redcar and Cleveland district and the area covered by the North Yorkshire unitary authority.

The site is identified as being of national importance in the Geological Conservation Review for its exposure of the Cleveland Dyke, a Palaeogene intrusion associated with the Mull central volcanic complex.

== Land ownership ==
All land within Langbaurgh Ridge SSSI is owned by the local authority.

== Sources ==
- English Nature citation sheet for the site (accessed 5 August 2006)
