= Little Ayton =

Village in North Yorkshire, England

Coordinates: 54.4842°N 1.1226°W

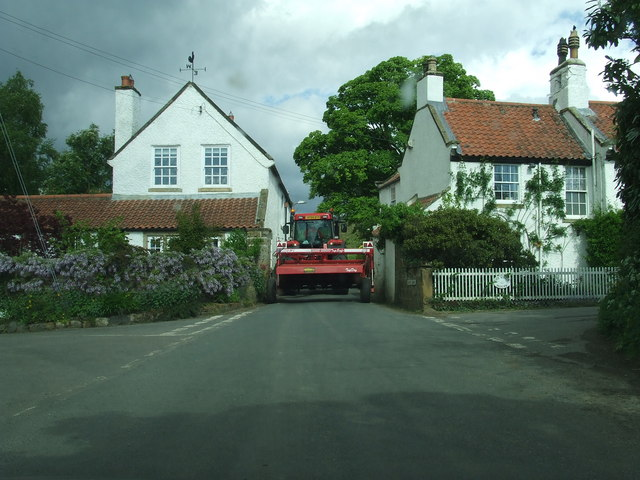
- Street in Little Ayton

- Location within North Yorkshire
- OS grid reference: NZ569102
- Unitary authority: North Yorkshire
- Ceremonial county: North Yorkshire
- Region: Yorkshire and the Humber
- Country: England
- Sovereign state: United Kingdom
- Post town: Great Ayton
- Postcode district: TS9
- Police: North Yorkshire
- Fire: North Yorkshire
- Ambulance: Yorkshire
- UK Parliament: Richmond and Northallerton

Little Ayton is a village and civil parish in the county of North Yorkshire, England and lies immediately south of Great Ayton. The population of this civil parish taken at the 2011 Census was less than 100. Details are included in the civil parish of Easby, Hambleton.

From 1974 to 2023 it was part of the Hambleton District, it is now administered by the unitary North Yorkshire Council.

Captain Cook's Monument, a stone obelisk is above the village, within the civil parish, on Easby Moor.

Little Ayton's name derives from the Old English Ea-tun, meaning 'river farm'. The river flowing through Little Ayton is the Leven, a tributary of the River Tees.
