= The Dudley Arms =

Pub in Ingleby Greenhow, North Yorkshire, England

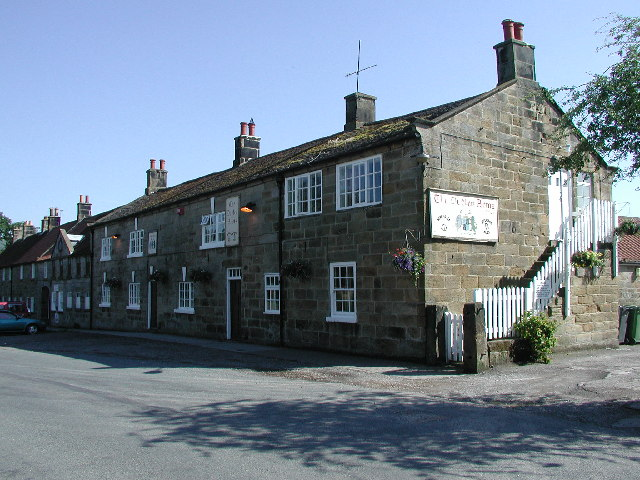
The pub, in 2005

The Dudley Arms is a historic pub in Ingleby Greenhow, a village in North Yorkshire, England.

The pub was built in the second half of the 18th century, and was extended in the early or mid 19th century. Additions were made to the rear in the 20th century. In the 1960s, its dining room was decorated in a style inspired by the Mediaeval period, with vaulted ceilings and tapestries. The pub is known for its "Flowering Onion" dish, an onion sliced and opened out to resemble a flower, then battered and deep fried.

The building was grade II listed in 1966. It is built of stone, with an eaves band, and a tile roof with a stone ridge and coping. It has two storeys, three bays and a two-bay extension on the right. On the front are two doorways, the right with a fanlight. The windows are a mix of sashes, most horizontally-sliding, and 20th-century small-paned windows. The openings in the left three bays have long lintels and tall raised keystones. On the right return are external steps.

== See also ==
- Listed buildings in Ingleby Greenhow
