= Ingleby Manor =

Historic building in North Yorkshire, England

Coordinates: 54°26′39″N 1°05′53″W

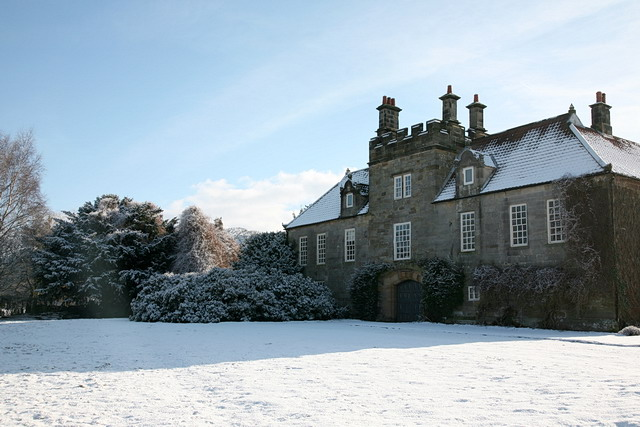
The building, in 2010

Ingleby Manor is a historic building in Ingleby Greenhow, a village in North Yorkshire, in England.

The manor house was built in about 1540 for William Eure. In 1608, the family sold it to Sir David Foulis. It was extended in the 17th century, the work including a cellar, and dormer windows. It was altered in the 18th century, and then greatly changed in the 19th century, this work including changes to all the elevations, and complete remodelling of the upper floor. The building was grade II* listed in 1952.

The house is built of stone, with a rectangular double courtyard plan, and a hipped Roman tile roof with stone ridges, coping and moulded kneelers, and fronts of seven and twelve bays. The northwest front has a central three-storey tower and flanking two storey three-bay wings. The tower contains a four-centred arched doorway, above which is a tripartite window, a two-light mullioned window with a hood mould, a string course, and an embattled parapet. The wings contain sash windows with chamfered surrounds, and in the bays flanking the tower are attic dormers with shaped pediments containing relief busts in the tympana.

== See also ==
- Grade II* listed buildings in North Yorkshire (district)
- Listed buildings in Ingleby Greenhow
