= Christ Church, Great Ayton =

Church in North Yorkshire, England

Coordinates: 54°29′24″N 1°08′30″W

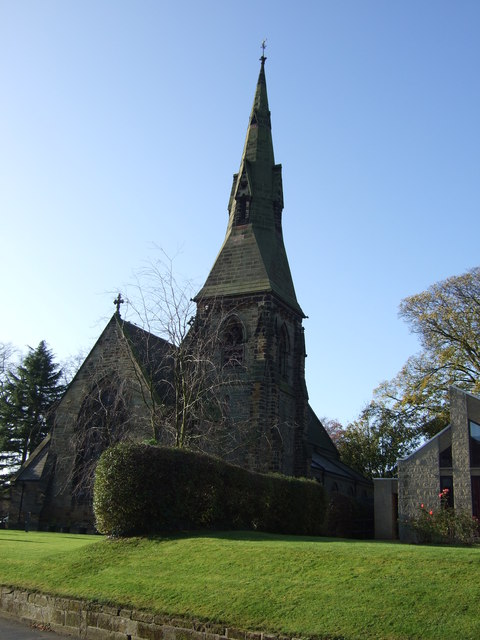
The church, in 2011

Christ Church is the parish church of Great Ayton, a village in North Yorkshire, in England.

From the Saxon period to the early 19th century, All Saints' Church, Great Ayton was the local parish church. Between 1876 and 1877, a replacement was built on a new site, with All Saints becoming a mortuary chapel. It was designed by John Ross and Robert Lamb, in a 14th-century Gothic style. Nikolaus Pevsner describes the building as "restless composition, and an uninteresting interior". It was grade II listed in 1966.

The church is built of sandstone with a Welsh slate roof, and is in Decorated style. It has a cruciform plan, consisting of a nave, a west narthex, north and south aisles, a south porch, a north transept steeple, and a chancel. The steeple has a tower with two stages, angle buttresses, traceried bell openings, and a broach spire with bands of red sandstone and lucarnes. Inside are preserved three pre-Conquest stones, brought from All Saints.

== See also ==
- Listed buildings in Great Ayton
