= Captain Cook Schoolroom Museum =

Museum in Great Ayton, North Yorkshire, England

Coordinates: 54°29′19″N 1°08′04″W

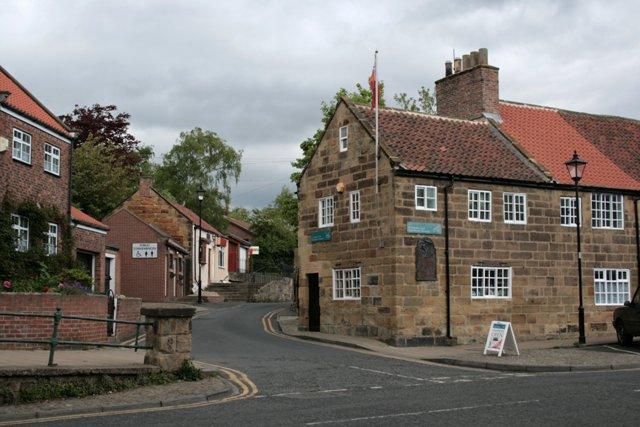
The museum, in 2007

The Captain Cook Schoolroom Museum is a museum in Great Ayton, a village in North Yorkshire, in England.

The building was constructed as a school, on the initiative of Michael Postgate. It was completed in 1704, and was extended and partly rebuilt in 1785. Captain James Cook was educated at the school. The school was later converted to serve as the headquarters of the parish council. In the late 20th century, it was converted into a museum, focusing on the life of Cook, and including a reconstruction of a schoolroom as it would have been in the mid 18th century. The building was grade II listed in 1969.

The building comprises a pair of houses with the schoolroom on the left. They are built of sandstone on a plinth, with swept pantile roofs and stone copings, and two storeys. The former cottage has three bays, on the front is a shop window and an inscribed bronze plaque, and at the rear are external steps to a doorway and an inscribed plaque. The two houses have four bays, and contain a doorway with a plain surround. The windows in all parts are horizontally-sliding sashes.

== See also ==
- Listed buildings in Great Ayton
