= Listed buildings in Easby, Hambleton =

Easby is a civil parish in the county of North Yorkshire, England. It contains eleven listed buildings that are recorded in the National Heritage List for England. All the listed buildings are designated at Grade II, the lowest of the three grades, which is applied to "buildings of national importance and special interest". The parish contains the village of Easby and the surrounding countryside and moorland, including Easby Moor to the east. The listed buildings in the moor consist of a memorial obelisk and two boundary stones. In the village are a small country house and its private chapel, houses, cottages, farmhouses and associated structures, and a chapel.

== Buildings ==
Name and location	Photograph	Date	Notes
Holly Farmhouse and barn 54.47192°N 1.12171°W	—	18th century	The farmhouse and barn are in stone, and have pantile roofs with stone copings and kneelers. The house has two storeys and an L-shaped plan, with a front of two bays and a one-bay extension at right angles. On the front is a porch, and the windows are sashes. The barn to the left has a single storey and a loft, and contains a sliding wagon door, a plain door, a loading door and a small window.
Forge Cottage and stable 54.46962°N 1.11233°W		Late 18th century	The house and stable are in stone, the house has a pantile roof with stone copings and curved kneelers, and the stable roof is in Welsh slate. The house has two storeys and a basement, and two bays. Steps lead up to the doorway, and the windows are horizontally-sliding sashes. The stable projects at the northeast corner.
Grove Farmhouse and barn 54.47395°N 1.10673°W		Late 18th century	The farmhouse and barn are in sandstone and have a pantile roof with copings and square keelers, and some asbestos on the barn. The house has two storeys and two bays, and a single-storey single-bay wing on the right. The windows are sashes in architraves. The stable to the right contains doorways, vents, and a round-arched cart entrance.
Mill Cottages; 54.47352°N 1.10915°W		Late 18th century	A house with flanking cottages in stone, with some brick, and pantile roofs with stone copings and kneelers. There are two storeys, the middle house higher, each with two bays. On the front are porches, and the windows are sashes, some in architraves.
Wesleyan Methodist Church; 54.46954°N 1.11228°W		Late 18th century (probable)	The chapel is in stone, and has a Welsh slate roof with a stone ridge, copings and finials. On the front is a doorway with a pointed arch, in the right return are two fixed windows with pointed arches, and at the rear are two cross-casement windows.
Easby Hall; 54.47072°N 1.10845°W	—	Early 19th century	A small country house in sandstone with a Welsh slate roof. There are two storeys, a U-shaped plan, and a main front with five bays. The middle three bays project and have fluted bands, and the central bay projects further, with giant fluted pilasters, and a Roman Doric tetrastyle porch with a fluted frieze, and a wrought iron balcony. Above is a dentilled cornice, and a relief-balustraded parapet with a small central pediment holding an oval panel with floral carving. The windows are sashes, the middle window in the upper floor with a floral surround. At the rear is a stair tower.
Garden wall, Holly Farmhouse; 54.47197°N 1.12155°W	—	Early 19th century	The wall is in red brick with stone coping, with a U-shaped plan around the garden. It is a tall wall, and ramps down in a sweeping curve to the south.
Captain Cook Monument; 54.48305°N 1.09083°W		1827	The monument, which was restored in 1895, commemorates Captain James Cook. It is in rock-faced rusticated sandstone. It consists of a tapering obelisk about 50 feet (15 m) high with a coved string course and a pyramidal cap. On the column is an inscribed polished granite plaque.
St Agatha's Chapel; 54.47026°N 1.10991°W		1881	The private chapel to Easby Hall, designed by James Fowler in Early English style, is in sandstone with tile roofs. It consists of a continuous nave and chancel, a north vestry, an octagonal mausoleum at the east end, and a west steeple. The steeple has a tower containing a west doorway with a pointed arch and a moulded surround. Above it is a timber bell stage, and a shingled broach spire with an iron crown and weathervane. The windows on the body of the church are lancets, and the mausoleum has pointed blank arcading with foliate capitals, and a pointed roof.
Boundary stone (east); 54.48495°N 1.08885°W		Undated	The boundary stone to the east of the path to the Captain Cook Monument has a round top, and is about 0.6 metres (2 ft 0 in) high. The north face is inscribed "T H R G A 14", and the south face is inscribed "E".
Boundary stone (west); 54.48421°N 1.09117°W		Undated	The boundary stone to the west of the path to the Captain Cook Monument has a round top, and is about 0.6 metres (2 ft 0 in) high. The north face is inscribed "T H R G A 15", and the south face is inscribed "E".
