= Acklington Dyke =

The Acklington Dyke is an igneous intrusion which extends from northwest of Hawick in southern Scotland east-southeastwards through the Borders region towards the North Sea coast of Northumberland in northern England.The dyke is associated with volcanism which took place at the Isle of Mull igneous centre in western Scotland during the early Palaeogene Period at a time of regional crustal tension associated with the opening of the north Atlantic Ocean and which resulted in the intrusion of innumerable dykes. The similar Cleveland Dyke has been dated to 55.8+/- 0.9 Ma. The dyke is composed of tholeiitic microgabbro and basalt Though generally thinner, it is up to 30 m wide in places. It is one of the most significant of a swarm of such intrusions associated with the Mull centre which extend southeastwards through this region, the others being the Cleveland Dyke and the Blyth and Sunderland subswarms of Northumberland and Tyne and Wear. They are grouped as part of the Mull Dyke Swarm which in turn is a part of the North Britain Palaeogene Dyke Suite

The dyke has been worked for roadstone at Acklington in Northumberland.
