= Church of All Saints, Great Ayton =

Anglican Church in North Yorkshire, England

Church of All Saints
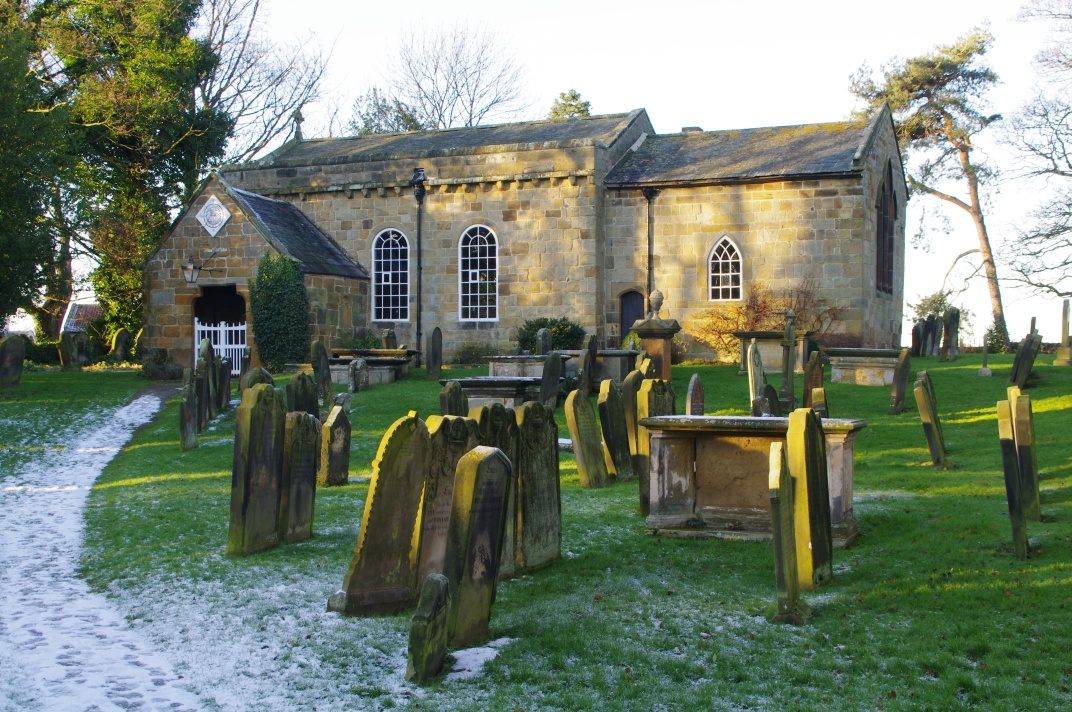
- The church and graveyard
- Church of All Saints
- 54.4897°N 1.1430°W
- OS grid reference: NZ 55616 10824
- Location: Great Ayton, North Yorkshire
- Country: England
- Denomination: Church of England
- Website: Official webpage

Architecture
- Functional status: Redundant
- Years built: c. 1175–1200
- Closed: 1877

Listed Building – Grade I
- Designated: 23 June 1966
- Reference no.: 1150650

The Church of All Saints is a grade I listed building and former parish church for Great Ayton, North Yorkshire, England. The churchyard is known to contain several graves to family members of Captain Cook, a noted seafarer.

All Saints was replaced as the main parish church in the 1870s by Christ Church, Great Ayton. The entire western end of the church, including its tower, was removed in 1880. All Saints is still open for people to be able to visit at certain times of the year.

== History ==
Elements of the present church of All Saints date back to the 8th century, and a church in Great Ayton (Atun), was mentioned in the Domesday survey of 1086. In the early part of the 12th century, Robert de Meynell is recorded as having given the church at Great Ayton to Whitby Abbey. The structure of the present church dates back to sometime after 1175, being recorded as being built "in the last quarter of the 12th century". The chancel measures 19 feet (5.8 m) by 14 feet 6 inches (4.42 m), the nave 32 feet 6 inches (9.91 m) by 18 feet 10 inches (5.74 m), and a south porch 9 feet 10 inches (3 m) by 11 feet 4 inches (3.45 m). The porch is believed to be a 13th-century addition to the old Norman doorway into the church. Renovations in the late 18th century (1788–1789) saw the roof stripped of its lead to pay for the tower to be rebuilt, only for it, and the a large western section of the church, to be pulled down in 1880. At the same time, despite the church not being publicly used, some of the windows were replaced in the church.

All Saints was replaced by a newer church, closer to the main road through Great Ayton in 1876. The building of Christ Church was precipitated by the state of the All Saints structure, and the increase in the population, related to the boom in ironstone mining in the area. However, the graveyard was still used routinely until 1881, before a new one was opened on the north side of the village. Some burials continued at All Saints; a report from November 1886 recalls the burial there of a Dr William Augustus Loy.

The church was grade I listed in 1966, notable being its Georgian pulpit, Tudor windows and late-Medieval king post roof. In modern times, the church is open for visits, special events, midweek Communion and celebratory services on Captain Cook's birthday. The church does not have any heating, or electric lighting. Candles are used to provide light.

== Clergy ==
Vicars of the Church of All Saints, Great Ayton
Year	Incumbent	Year	Incumbent	Year	Incumbent
c. 1300	Ralph (the Deacon of Ayton)	1662	Cornelius Cockburne	1727	Ralph Jackson
1577	Richard Stonley♦	1679	Richard Slinger†	1747	George Metcalfe
1601	Thomas Aldus†	1681	William Stephenson†	1756	Anthony Hastwell
1631	Thomas Hardye	1705	George Spencer	1794	Thomas Deason
1639	Thomas Kennington	1707	Maurice Lisle†	1795	William Deason
1646	Thomas Edwards†	1715	Peter Moon	1827	Joseph Ibbetson
1661	George Eubanke	1719	Thomas Morley		

- †Died in office
- ♦Interregnum between incumbent and previous when dates are incorrect, period appears too long or records are incomplete.

After 1877, All Saints was closed, and Christ Church in the village was used instead.

== Churchyard ==
Several members of Captain Cook's family are buried in the churchyard. Their burial plot is marked by a grade II listed headstone made from sandstone. Cook's father, also called James, is believed to have carved many of the Cook family headstones in the churchyard.

== See also ==
- Grade I listed buildings in North Yorkshire (district)
- Listed buildings in Great Ayton
