= Langbaurgh Wapentake =

Former administrative division of Yorkshire, England

Coordinates: 54.57923°N 1.03409°W

Langbaurgh
- Wapentake
- Wapentakes of the North Riding of Yorkshire, in yellow. Langbaurgh is in red.
  - Type: 41 Parishes
- Subdivisions
  - Type: Western and Eastern

Langbaurgh /lɑːŋɡbɑːrθ/ was a liberty or wapentake of the North Riding of Yorkshire. It covered an area of the shire's north-eastern tip. The wapentake took its name from Langbaurgh hamlet, in present-day Great Ayton parish.

The name was re-used for the non-metropolitan district of Langbaurgh, later Langbaurgh-on-Tees, created in 1974, which covered the area of the eastern division. It has been known since 1996 as the unitary authority of Redcar and Cleveland.

== Extent ==
The northern extent covering the south of the Tees from Low Worsall to South Gare. The south eastern extent varied: 1068 the area covered three of four parishes (excluding Hackness) of what came to be the Whitby Strand. Dunsley beck later formed the eastern coastal boundary with the Whitby Strand wapentake. The south western extent varied around the Tees basin into the Yorkshire Moors.

== Ancient Parishes ==
Langbaurgh West: Acklam; Ayton; Carlton; Crathorne; Ingleby Arncliffe; Ingleby Greenhow; Kildale; Kirkby; Kirk Leavington; Marton; Ormesby; Rudby; Smeaton; Stainton; Stokesley; Whorlton and Yarm.

Langbaurgh East: Brotton; Danby; Easington; Egton; Glaisdale; Guisborough; Hinderwell; Kirkleatham; Liverton; Loftus; Lythe; Marske; Skelton; Upleatham and Westerdale.
