= St Agatha's Chapel, Easby =

Church in Easby, North Yorkshire, England

Coordinates: 54°28′13″N 1°06′36″W

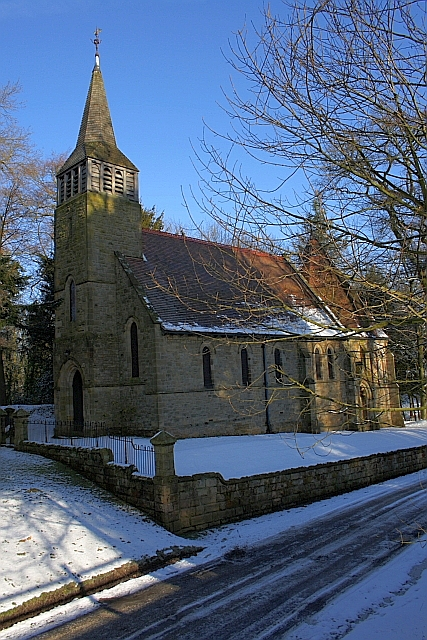
The church, in 2010

St Agatha's Chapel is a private Anglican chapel in Easby, a village near Stokesley in North Yorkshire, in England.

A chapel was dedicated in Easby in the 14th century, but it appears to have been dissolved by the reign of Edward VI. In 1881, a new private chapel was built on the initiative of James Emerson of Easby Hall. It was designed by James Fowler in the Early English style and incorporated a mausoleum. The stained glass was designed by Powell Brothers. The church was grade II listed in 1966.

The chapel consists of a continuous two-bay nave and chancel, a north vestry, an octagonal mausoleum at the east end, and a west steeple. The steeple has a tower containing a west doorway with a pointed arch and a moulded surround. Above it is a timber bell stage, and a shingled broach spire with an iron crown and weathervane. The windows on the body of the church are lancets, and the mausoleum has pointed blank arcading with foliate capitals, and a pointed roof. Inside, there is a staircase to a small west gallery, and a stone reredos and pulpit.

== See also ==
- Listed buildings in Easby, Hambleton
