= Listed buildings in Ingleby Greenhow =

Ingleby Greenhow is a civil parish in the county of North Yorkshire, England. It contains 37 listed buildings that are recorded in the National Heritage List for England. Of these, one is listed at Grade I, the highest of the three grades, two are at Grade II*, the middle grade, and the others are at Grade II, the lowest grade. The parish contains the villages of Ingleby Greenhow and Battersby, and the surrounding countryside and moorland. Most of the listed buildings are houses, cottages and associated structures, farmhouses and farm buildings. The others include a church, tombs in the churchyard and the churchyard wall, a public house, bridges, and a boundary stone.

== Key ==
Grade	Criteria
I	Buildings of exceptional interest, sometimes considered to be internationally important
II*	Particularly important buildings of more than special interest
II	Buildings of national importance and special interest

== Buildings ==
Name and location	Photograph	Date	Notes	Grade
St Andrew's Church; 54.44860°N 1.10570°W		12th century	The church has been altered and extended through the centuries, it was almost completely rebuilt in 1741, and the vestry was added in 1905 by Temple Moore. It is built in stone, and consists of a west turret, a nave, a north aisle, a south porch, a chancel and a north vestry. The turret has a 12th-century base, and contains a slit window on the west side, the bell stage is corbelled out on the west side and has louvred bell openings, above which is a coved cornice, and a pyramidal roof with a pyramidal finial. The porch is gabled, and the inner doorway has a round arch with imposts and a keystone.	I
Ingleby Manor; 54.44414°N 1.09815°W		16th century	A manor house that has been altered and extended, it is in stone, with a rectangular double courtyard plan, and a hipped Roman tile roof with stone ridges, coping and moulded kneelers, and fronts of seven and twelve bays. The northwest front has a central three-storey tower and flanking two storey three-bay wings. The tower contains a four-centred arched doorway, above which is a tripartite window, a two-light mullioned window with a hood mould, a string course, and an embattled parapet. The wings contain sash windows with chamfered surrounds, and in the bays flanking the tower are attic dormers with shaped pediments containing relief busts in the tympana.	II*
Walls and gate piers, Ingleby Manor; 54.44838°N 1.10521°W	—	Late 16th to early 17th century	The estate walls and gate piers are in limestone, the walls with saddleback coping, and they contain carriage and pedestrian entrances. The piers at the carriage entrance are channelled and rusticated, on narrow plinths, and have moulded cornices and pyramidal finials. In the pedestrian gateway is a wrought iron gate with an overthrow, and the path is cobbled.	II
The Old Hall; 54.45935°N 1.08286°W	—	17th century	The house, which was extended in the 19th century, is in stone, the original part has a Welsh slate roof, and the extension has a pantile roof, with stone ridges, coping and block kneelers. The early part has two storeys and an attic, and three bays, on a chamfered plinth. The doorway has a chamfered surround and a deep lintel. The windows on the front are casements, with a continuous moulded hood mould over the ground floor windows, and at the rear are chamfered mullioned windows. The extension has two storeys and two bays, and the windows are horizontally-sliding sashes.	II
Ripley chest tomb 54.44851°N 1.10587°W	—	Late 17th century	The chest tomb is in the churchyard of St Andrew's Church, to the southwest of the church. It is in stone, and has a deep cornice under a chamfered lid with cusped corners and an inscription.	II
Atkinson Wood Farmhouse and outbuildings 54.46768°N 1.09754°W		Early 18th century	The farmhouse and outbuildings are in sandstone, and have pantile roofs with stone ridges, copings and kneelers. The range consists of the farmhouse with two storeys and three bays, to the right is a byre with a granary above and three bays, and two single-storey buildings with two bays each. The house has a plinth and contains windows of various types. The byre has external steps with a dog kennel beneath.	II
Chest tomb southwest of the porch 54.44852°N 1.10571°W	—	Early 18th century (probable)	The chest tomb in the churchyard of St Andrew's Church is in stone. The lid has a chamfered arris and worn lettering.	II
Pear Tree Cottage and The Nook; 54.44951°N 1.10263°W	—	Early 18th century	A house, later a house and a cottage, in stone on a plinth, with a moulded eaves band, and a pantile roof with a stone ridge and copings, and moulded kneelers. There are two storeys and three bays. On the front are two doorways with deep lintels, and the windows are sashes, one horizontally-sliding. Inside, there is an inglenook fireplace.	II
Chest tomb south of the chancel south-east window 54.44860°N 1.10532°W	—	c.1732	The chest tomb in the churchyard of St Andrew's Church is in stone. The lid has a moulded edge and a worn inscription.	II
High Farmhouse and farm building 54.45874°N 1.08103°W	—	Early to mid 18th century	The buildings are in stone, and have pantile roofs with stone ridges and coping. The house has two storeys and three bays, and a moulded eaves band. Some windows have chamfered mullions with chamfered sills and lintels, and others are horizontally-sliding sashes. The farm building to the north has two bays, and an open ground floor with a central stone pier, and in the upper floor are casement windows.	II
Holme Farmhouse and outbuilding 54.46056°N 1.08025°W		Early to mid 18th century	The buildings are in stone, and have pantile roofs with stone coping. The house has two storeys and four bays, a plinth and a moulded eaves band. On the front is a gabled porch, and the windows are sashes, those in the ground floor with tripartite lintels. The outbuilding to the left has a single storey and four bays, and contains a garage door.	II
Chest tomb south of the porch 54.44849°N 1.10564°W	—	18th century	The chest tomb in the churchyard of St Andrew's Church is in stone. The lid has a moulded arris and worn lettering, and the base has a moulded band.	II
Chest tomb south of the nave 54.44843°N 1.10554°W	—	18th century	The chest tomb in the churchyard of St Andrew's Church is in stone. The lid has a rounded edge, and a raised panel with a worn inscription.	II
Former cowhouse, Keepers Lodge and Delisle Cottage; 54.44128°N 1.09935°W	—	18th century	The former cowhouse is in stone on a plinth, with a moulded eaves band, and a pantile roof with a stone ridge and moulded coping. There is one storey and three bays, and it contains a stable door and vents.	II
Former Ingleby Greenhow Post Office; 54.44943°N 1.10501°W		18th century	A house and three cottages, at one time a post office and a shop, later two houses, in stone with an eaves band and a pantile roof with a stone ridge, copings and block kneelers. There are two storeys and six bays, and most of the windows are horizontally-sliding sashes.	II
Coach house and stables, Manor House Farm; 54.44393°N 1.09733°W	—	18th century	The coach house and stables are in stone with an eaves band and pantile roofs. There is one storey, and a central tower with a hipped roof. The tower has a round-arched doorway, and above it is a round-arched window in an architrave with a decorated keystone, and a coat of arms.	II
The Old Vicarage; 54.44929°N 1.10328°W	—	Mid 18th century	The vicarage, later a private house, is in stone, with an eaves band, and a tile roof with a stone ridge, coping and shaped kneelers. There are two storeys and an attic, and three bays. On the front is a doorway, and the windows are horizontally-sliding sashes with raised surrounds and keystones.	II
Farm buildings and engine house northwest of Centre Farmhouse; 54.46064°N 1.08192°W	—	Mid to late 18th century	The farm buildings are in stone, the engine house is in red brick on a stone plinth, and the roofs are in pantile with stone ridges and coping. The buildings consist of two byres, a cart lodge, and an engine house, which is gabled, and contains two segmental-arched openings, and a blind oculus in the gable.	II
Farm buildings west of Holme Farmhouse; 54.46042°N 1.08065°W		Mid to late 18th century	The cart lodge and byre with a loft above are in stone, with a holl0w-moulded eaves band. The roof is of pantile at the front and tile at the rear, with stone ridges and coping, a shaped kneeler to the right and block kneelers on the left. There are two storeys and three bays, and a single-storey outbuilding on the left. To the left is a segmental-arched cart entry, to its right are external steps to a loft door, and further to the right are doors and windows.	II
Shepherds Close; 54.41617°N 1.08702°W		Mid to late 18th century	A farmhouse that was later extended, it is in stone on a partial plinth, with a moulded eaves band, and a pantile roof with a stone ridge, coping and shaped kneelers. There are four bays, the left two with two storeys and the others with one. The windows are mixed, some are casements and the others are sashes, most horizontally-sliding.	II
The Dudley Arms Public House; 54.44960°N 1.10542°W		Late 18th century	The public house is in stone, with an eaves band, and a tile roof with a stone ridge and coping. There are two storeys, three bays and a two-bay extension on the right. On the front are two doorways, the right with a fanlight. The windows are a mix of sashes, most horizontally-sliding, and 20th-century small-paned windows. The openings in the left three bays have long lintels and tall raised keystones. On the right return are external steps.	II
Outbuilding, Manor House Farm; 54.44420°N 1.09718°W	—	Late 18th century	The outbuilding and coach house are in stone, and have an eaves band, and a hipped roof of Welsh slate and stone slate, with stone ridges and coping. There are two storeys and an L-shaped plan, with ranges of six and two bays. The openings include a doorway with imposts, and a doorway with a fanlight. The windows are sashes, and all the openings have lintels with keystones.	II
Outbuilding and pigsty, Shepherds Close; 54.41635°N 1.08695°W	—	Late 18th century (probable)	The outbuilding, with the lower pigsty on the right, is in stone, with eaves bands, and pantile roofs with stone ridges, copings and block kneelers. There is a single storey and three bays, and it contains doorways. In the yard wall is a gateway and a trough chute.	II
West Wood Farmhouse; 54.43018°N 1.10880°W	—	Late 18th century	The farmhouse, later a private house, is in stone on a plinth, with a moulded eaves band, and a pantile roof with stone coping and shaped kneelers. There are two storeys, three bays, and a rear wing on the right. In the centre is a gabled porch containing an elliptical-headed doorway with a keystone. The windows are sash windows, those in the outer bays tripartite, with long lintels and tall raised keystones.	II
Ingleby Bridge; 54.45015°N 1.10853°W	—	c. 1800	The bridge, which carries Marsh Lane over a stream, is in stone, and consists of a single segmental arch with a moulded hood band. The parapet has chamfered coping, and at the ends are drum piers with rectangular bases and stepped domed capstones.	II
Byre range, Shepherds Close; 54.41598°N 1.08689°W		Late 18th to early 19th century	The byres are in stone, with an eaves band, and a pantile roof with a stone ridge, coping and block kneelers. There are two storeys and four bays, the left two bays lower. The openings include a stable door.	II
Bridge northeast of The Old Hall; 54.45992°N 1.08263°W		18th to early 19th century	The footbridge over a small stream is in stone. The side walls, canted on the upstream side, carry three monolithic slabs, and on the downstream side is a parapet.	II
Farm buildings, West Wood Farm; 54.43003°N 1.10828°W	—	Late 18th to early 19th century	The farm buildings are in stone, and have pantile roofs with stone ridges, coping, and moulded kneelers. They consist of a barn with a loft and five bays, and to the right is a byre with four bays.	II
Farm building, pigsties and privies, Atkinson Wood Farm; 54.46775°N 1.09786°W	—	Early 19th century	The buildings to the northwest of the farmhouse are in stone and have pantile roofs with stone ridges, coping, and block kneelers. The byre/barn has two storeys, three bays, a lower four-bay range to the left, and attached pigsties and privies. The openings include sable doors and vents.	II
Former butcher's shop 54.44950°N 1.10514°W	—	Early 19th century	A stable, later a butcher's shop, in stone, with an eaves band, and a pantile roof with a stone ridge and coping. There are two storeys and six bays. In the left bay is an elliptical carriage arch, and above the three bays to the right is a gable containing a clock in an architrave. In the ground floor are sash windows and a blocked doorway, and the upper floor contains windows with slatted lower parts. At the rear are external steps and a dormer.	II
Farm buildings and engine house, Drummer Hill Farm; 54.46024°N 1.12254°W	—	Early 19th century	The buildings are in stone and some red brick, with an eaves band, and a pantile roof with a stone ridge and coping. They consist of a four-bay barn with a gabled engine house, and a three-bay cart lodge with a loft. On the front are external steps, and the openings include two elliptical arched entrances, slit vents and a stable door.	II*
Barn and engine house, Gilder Tofts; 54.45538°N 1.11656°W		Early 19th century	The barn is in stone, with an eaves band, and a pantile roof with a stone ridge, coping and block kneelers. There is one storey and a loft, and six bays. It contains a stable door, vents, and wooden steps leading to a loft door. At the rear is an apsidal engine house.	II
Churchyard wall and gateways, St Andrew's Church; 54.44845°N 1.10541°W		Early 19th century (probable)	The churchyard wall is in stone and about 2 metres (6 ft 7 in) high, with saddleback coping. There are two gateways with piers, the east round-topped, and the west with a pyramidal top. The overthrows are in iron, and have central lanterns and scrolled finials.	II
Foulis Cottage; 54.44950°N 1.10244°W	—	Early to mid 19th century	The house is in stone on a chamfered plinth, with a floor band, an eaves cornice, and a pantile roof with a stone ridge, coping, and hollow-moulded kneelers. There are two storeys and an attic, and three bays. Steps lead up to the central doorway that has a fanlight, and the windows are sashes.	II
Jenny Bradley Stone; 54.41254°N 1.05951°W		1838 or earlier	The parish boundary stone consists of a roughly tooled monolith about 2.5 metres (8 ft 2 in) high. On the south side is a date, and the north side has an inscribed name.	II
Hay barn, Manor House Farm; 54.44395°N 1.09684°W	—	Mid 19th century	The haybarn is in stone with some weatherboarding, and has a double Roman tile roof. There are fronts of one and four bays. Originally open-sided, there is partial infill, and the square piers have chamfered offsets.	II
Mounting block, The Old Vicarage; 54.44939°N 1.10329°W	—	19th century (probable)	The mounting block at the entrance to the garden is in stone. On the house side, steps lead up to the top platform.	II
