= Cleveland Dyke =

Geological feature across England and Scotland

The Cleveland Dyke (or Armathwaite Dyke, Cleveland-Armathwaite Dyke or Armathwaite-Cleveland Dyke) is an igneous intrusion which extends from Galloway in southern Scotland through Cumbria and County Durham in northern England to the North York Moors in North Yorkshire.

The dyke is associated with volcanism which took place at the Isle of Mull igneous centre in western Scotland during the early Palaeogene Period at a time of regional crustal tension associated with the opening of the north Atlantic Ocean and which resulted in the intrusion of innumerable dykes. The Cleveland Dyke has been dated to 55.8+/- 0.9 Ma. Though generally from 22 to 28 m wide, in places it is up to 30 metres (98 ft) wide and has been mapped over a distance of 430 kilometres (270 mi). It is the most significant of a swarm of such intrusions associated with the Mull centre which extend southeastwards through this region, the others being the Acklington Dyke and the Blyth and Sunderland subswarms of Northumberland and Tyne and Wear.

It was thought traditionally that the entire dyke comprising some 85 cubic kilometres (20 cu mi) of rock was emplaced as a single pulse of magma over a few days, moving southeastwards from Mull but also rising vertically through the country rock, this mechanism leading in places to the development of en echelon segments of dyke. However, more recent work suggests that vertical emplacement as a series of thin blades of magma from a series of high level chambers within the crust is more likely. Offsets of the alignment occur within Scotland where the dyke crosses Caledonide fault systems. The dyke is composed of basaltic andesite which is amygdaloidal in places.

The dyke has been worked for roadstone at numerous localities including Barrock Fell near Armathwaite in Cumbria and at both Cockfield Fell and Bolam in County Durham. Setts for road construction were made from the dyke at Langbaurgh.
