= Great Ayton Friends' School =

Former school in North Yorkshire, England

Coordinates: 54.48785°N 1.13265°W

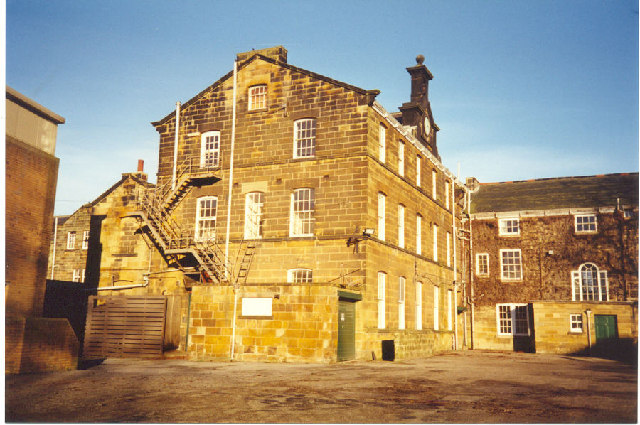

Information
- Established: 1841
- Closed: 1997

Great Ayton Friends' School (1841–1997) in Great Ayton, North Yorkshire, England, was a private, co-educational, agricultural boarding school, run by the Religious Society of Friends (the Quakers).

The school was situated on High Green on an estate of around 70 acres (280,000 m^{2}). The River Leven (a tributary of the River Tees), ran through the school grounds and was bridged in several places.

== History ==
In the early 1800s, County Durham Quakers searched for a suitable site for an agricultural school. This was for the children of disowned Quakers who were not eligible for Quaker education, Unable to find a site in the preferred area of Bishop Auckland, Durham Friends sought the assistance of Thomas Richardson, a Quaker from Darlington who had come to live in Great Ayton on his retirement in 1830.

In 1841 the school was established "for the maintenance of 36 boys and the same number of girls belonging to or connected with the Society of Friends; others are admitted at a charge representing about the average cost of each child per annum. There was now accommodation for 80 boarders. The course of instruction embraces Latin, French, Euclid, Geometry, Algebra, and various scientific subjects: Agriculture, Chemistry, Physiology, Botany, etc. The girls are trained either for domestic work or a higher sphere of life". George Dixon was the first superintendent of the Quaker School, he also started a botanical class in the village for local residents, including lichenologist William A. Mudd, (1829-1879).

An estate of nearly 70 acres (280,000 m^{2}) was purchased for the purposes of the school, and many additions were made to the premises.

Disownment for 'marrying out' ended in 1854, and the school changed with the times, becoming the Friends' School.

From 1935 to 1942, the school hosted nearly 40 refugees from the Nazi regime.

The school gradually attracted greater numbers of pupils until there was no room large enough to contain all of the 300 pupils. In 1968 the Meeting House was enlarged to accommodate the complete student body.

In 1991, the school adopted a more commercial approach. It dropped its named association with the Quakers and adopted the new name 'Ayton School'. It appointed a marketing manager to promote the school's facilities to the general public.

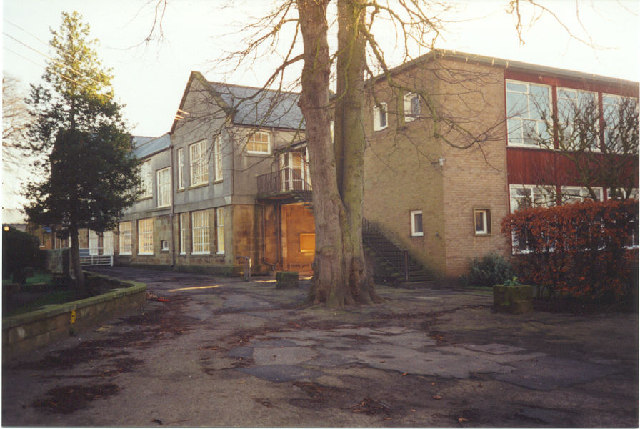
The Friends School in 1998

The school closed in 1997. Dwindling pupil numbers had given the trustees no other option but to close the school at the end of the term.

The school's 50 teachers and other staff lost their jobs and the school's grade II listed building and its 30-acre (120,000 m^{2}) estate were put up for sale.

During its 157-year history the school was attended by almost 7,500 pupils and employed 550 staff.

== Present ==
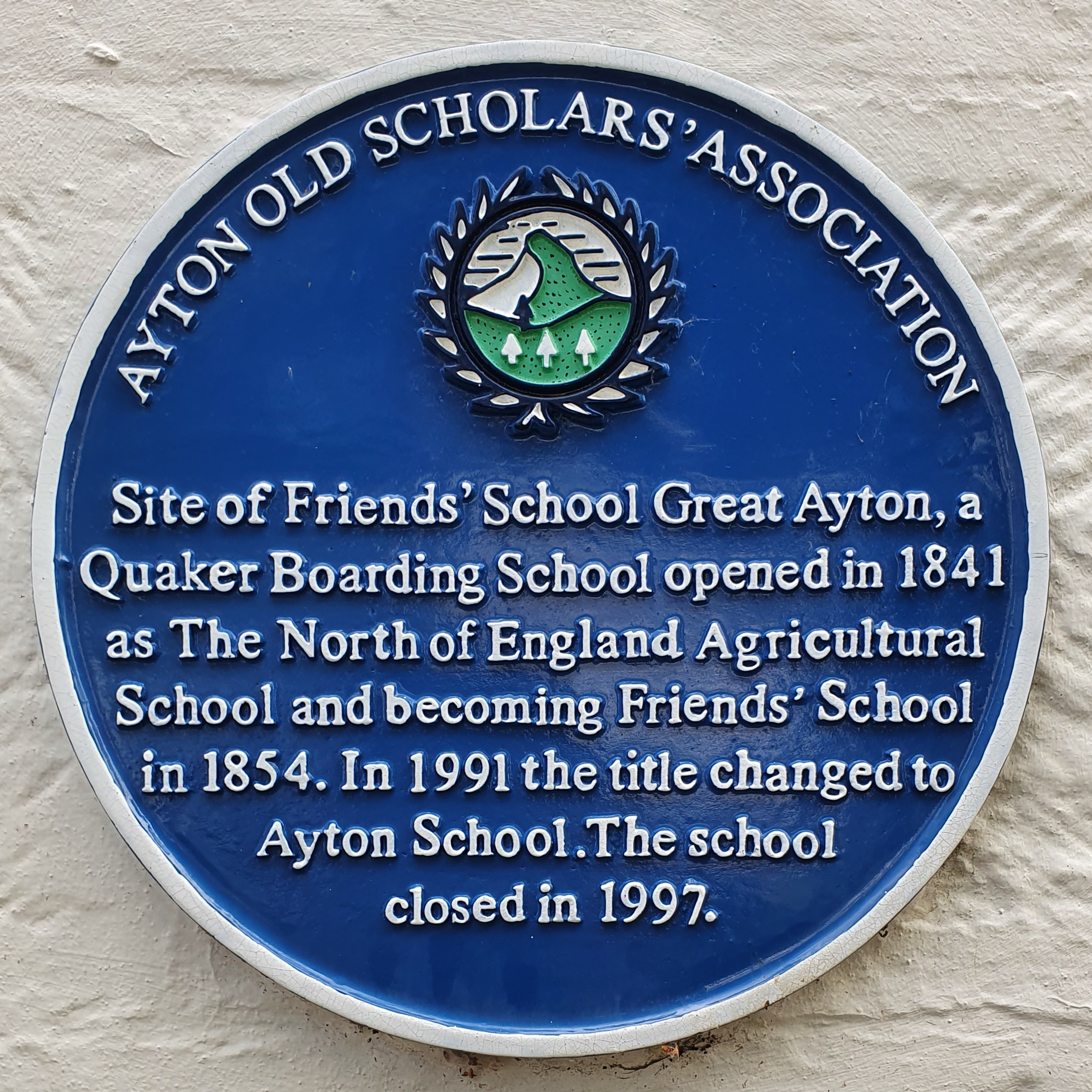
Blue plaque at the old entrance to the school, located at High Green

The Friends school estate was sold to Wimpey Homes. Working with English Heritage and The Georgian Society, the company established a development with attempted sympathy to the local style and to the surrounding architecture. Many of the school's original features have been retained and the local wildlife and landscapes have been carefully managed.

Wimpey built 63 properties on the grounds. The styles vary from the farmhouse family homes, to cottages and traditional three-storey town houses.

In the Richardson School Hall, 21 apartments were sold. The Quakers in Great Ayton set aside part of the meeting house as an 'Old Scholars' room containing items selected by Old Scholars to be retained as mementoes of the School. The War Memorial plaque from the School dining room was placed there while the memorial benches remained in the meeting room.

== See also ==
- Listed buildings in Great Ayton
