= Langbaurgh, North Yorkshire =

Hamlet in North Yorkshire, England

Coordinates: 54.500°N 1.145°W

Langbaurgh
- Location within North Yorkshire
- OS grid reference: NZ557118
- Civil parish: Great Ayton
- Unitary authority: North Yorkshire
- Ceremonial county: North Yorkshire
- Region: Yorkshire and the Humber
- Country: England
- Sovereign state: United Kingdom
- Post town: Middlesbrough
- Postcode district: TS9
- Dialling code: 01642
- Police: North Yorkshire
- Fire: North Yorkshire
- Ambulance: Yorkshire
- UK Parliament: Richmond and Northallerton

Langbaurgh is a hamlet in the civil parish of Great Ayton in North Yorkshire, England. The place gave its name to the Langbaurgh Wapentake.

Langbaurgh Hall is a Grade II listed building, dating from 1830.

North of the hamlet is the Langbaurgh Ridge, part of the Cleveland Dyke, where stone was quarried to make setts for road construction.

== See also ==
- Listed buildings in Great Ayton
