= Easby, Hambleton =

Village and civil parish in North Yorkshire, England

Coordinates: 54°28′14″N 1°06′35″W

Easby
- Location within North Yorkshire
- Population: 197 (Including Little Ayton. 2011 census)
- OS grid reference: NZ577086
- Civil parish: Easby
- Unitary authority: North Yorkshire
- Ceremonial county: North Yorkshire
- Region: Yorkshire and the Humber
- Country: England
- Sovereign state: United Kingdom
- Post town: MIDDLESBROUGH
- Postcode district: TS9
- Police: North Yorkshire
- Fire: North Yorkshire
- Ambulance: Yorkshire

Easby is a village and civil parish in the county of North Yorkshire, England. It lies approximately 2 miles (3.2 km) south-east of Great Ayton. The larger village of Low Easby lies 0.3 miles (480 m) down the road, but neither have any amenities, only a postbox.

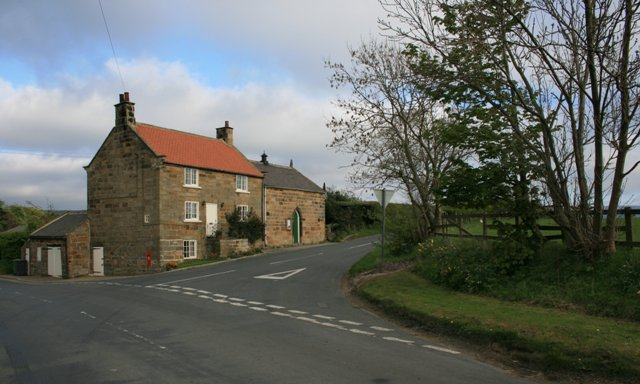
The Methodist chapel of Easby

The name Easby comes from Old Norse and means farmstead or village of a man called Esa.

From 1974 to 2023 it was part of the Hambleton District, it is now administered by the unitary North Yorkshire Council.

St Agatha's Chapel lies in the village.

== See also ==
- Listed buildings in Easby, Hambleton
