= Langbaurgh East =

Ancient division of North Yorkshire, England

Coordinates: 54.581°N 0.977°W

- Wapentake
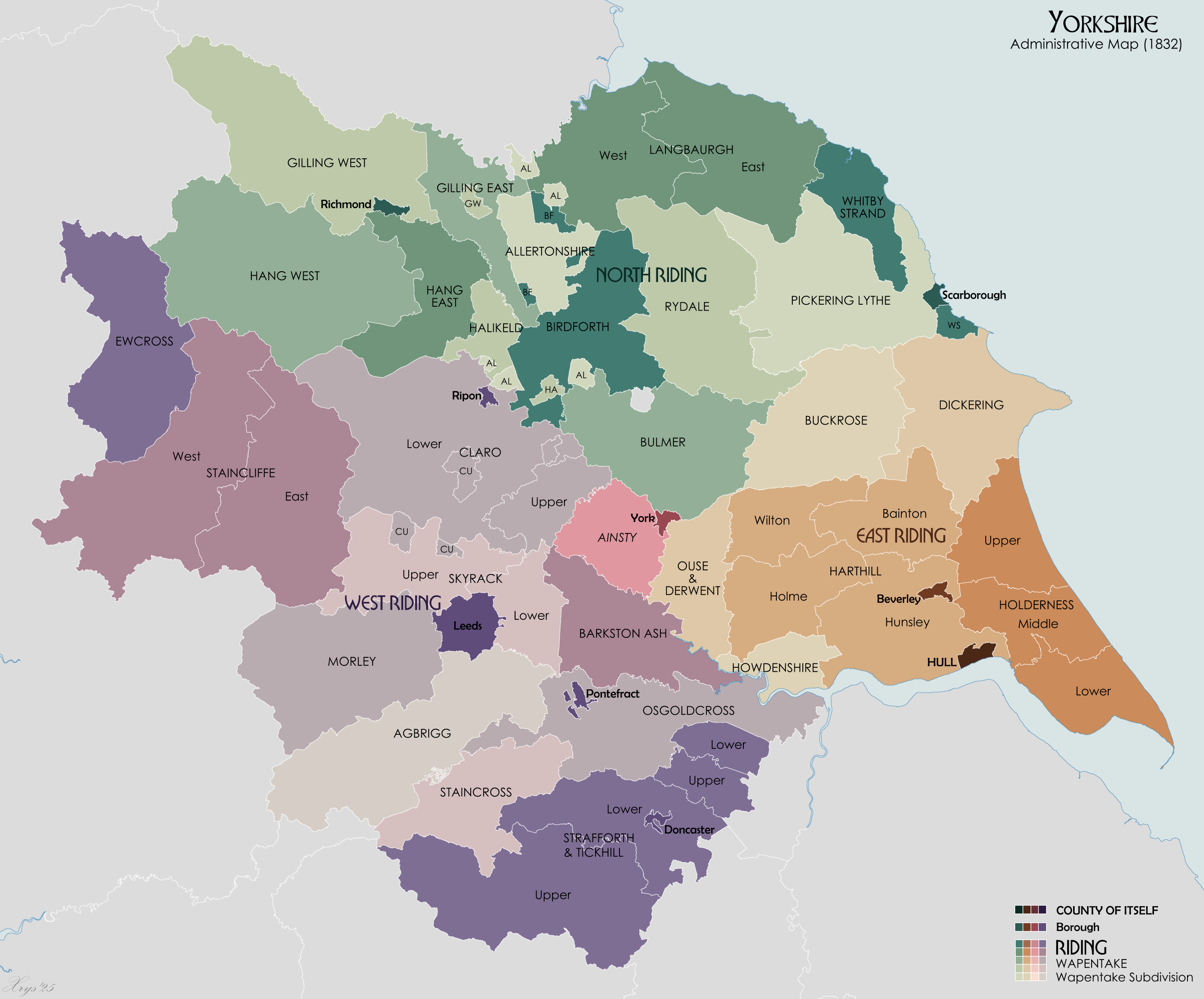
- Wapentakes of North Yorkshire. Langbaurgh East is a dark green colour on the top centre right.
- History
  - Preceded by: Langbaurgh Wapentake

Langbaurgh East was a wapentake of the North Riding of Yorkshire, the eastern division of Langbaurgh, England. The name is now (as of 1 April 2005) in use as a local justice area (formerly a petty sessional division), consisting of the eastern and mostly rural part of the borough of Redcar and Cleveland.

The eastern Wapentake in particular covered roughly the area of modern-day Redcar and Cleveland and the northernmost parts of the former Scarborough district within North Yorkshire. The boundary roughly follows from Wilton along to Redcar in the north and all the way down to Whitby in the south, across to Danby, west of Whitby, and then back up along the Cleveland Hills to Wilton.
