= Ingleby Greenhow =

Village and civil parish in North Yorkshire, England

Coordinates: 54°26′59″N 1°06′17″W

- Location within North Yorkshire
- Population: 370 (2011 census)
- OS grid reference: NZ581063
- Civil parish: Ingleby Greenhow
- Unitary authority: North Yorkshire
- Ceremonial county: North Yorkshire
- Region: Yorkshire and the Humber
- Country: England
- Sovereign state: United Kingdom
- Post town: MIDDLESBROUGH
- Postcode district: TS9
- Police: North Yorkshire
- Fire: North Yorkshire
- Ambulance: Yorkshire

Ingleby Greenhow is a village and civil parish in the county of North Yorkshire, England. It is on the border of the North York Moors and 3 miles (4.8 km) south of Great Ayton.

From 1974 to 2023 it was part of the Hambleton District. It is now administered by the unitary North Yorkshire Council.

The parish of Ingleby Greenhow has records of a John Thomasson de Grenehow, a member of the clergy, who in 1376 "had to appear before a Commission appointed to be tried with several others for either poaching or cutting down timber, or destroying property belonging to Peter de Malo Luca the 6th, of Mulgrave Castle".

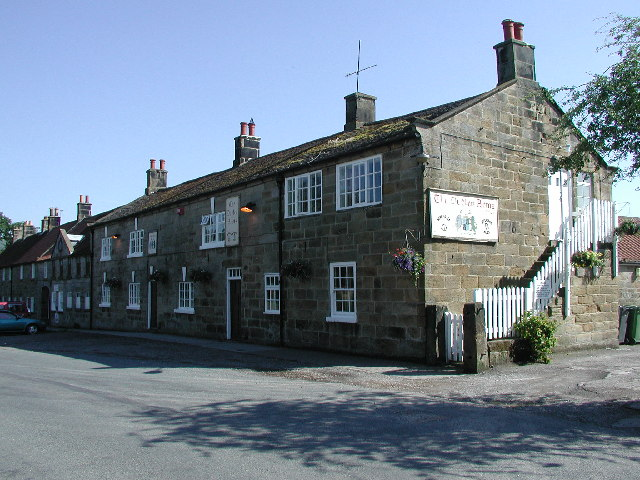
The Dudley Arms, Ingleby Greenhow

The name may derive from the Saxon for "Englishman's green hill". "How", derived from the Old Norse word haugr, means hill or mound. Ingleby Manor was bought by a Scottish courtier David Foulis in 1608. St Andrew's Church was almost entirely rebuilt in 1741, but has a Norman chancel arch inside.

In 1931, British altitude and distance records for gliders were established over the moors near here, as recounted by the novelist, pilot, and aeronautical engineer Nevil Shute in his memoir, Slide Rule. The glider, a Tern produced by Shute's company, Airspeed Ltd. was flown by a skilled German sailplane pilot, Carl Magersuppe, who had been hired by Airspeed.

== Sport ==
Ingleby Greenhow Cricket Club has a history dating back to the mid nineteenth century. It once featured in a calendar comprising England's most picturesque cricket pitches. The club's ground is situated half a kilometre west of the village, on the north side of Marsh Lane. The club have two senior teams: a Saturday 1st XI, who compete in the Langbaurgh Cricket League, and a Midweek Senior XI in the Esk Valley Evening League.

== See also ==
- Listed buildings in Ingleby Greenhow
