= Great Ayton =

Village and civil parish in North Yorkshire, England

Coordinates: 54°29′24″N 1°08′13″W

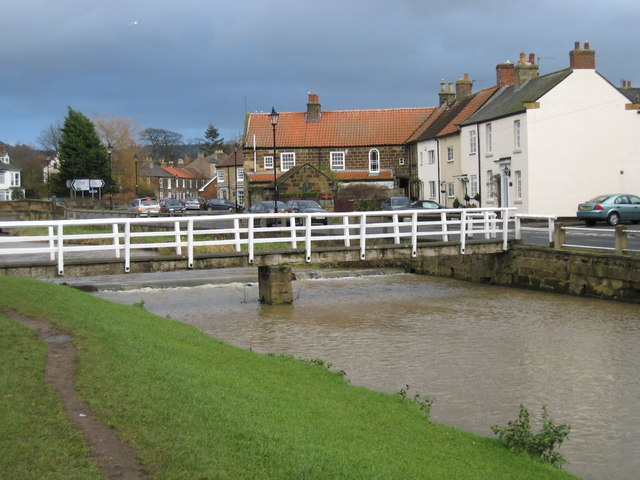
- Footbridge over the River Leven in Low Green

- Location within North Yorkshire
- Population: 4,346 (2021 census)
- OS grid reference: NZ565115
- Civil parish: Great Ayton
- Unitary authority: North Yorkshire
- Ceremonial county: North Yorkshire
- Region: Yorkshire and the Humber
- Country: England
- Sovereign state: United Kingdom
- Post town: Middlesbrough
- Postcode district: TS9
- Dialling code: 01642
- Police: North Yorkshire
- Fire: North Yorkshire
- Ambulance: Yorkshire
- UK Parliament: Richmond and Northallerton
- Website: Parish council website

Great Ayton is a village and civil parish in North Yorkshire, England. The River Leven (a tributary of the River Tees) flows through the village, which lies just north of the North York Moors. According to the 2021 Census, the parish has a population of 4,346.

== Etymology ==
Great Ayton's name derives from Old English Ea-tun, meaning 'river farm'. The river flowing through Great Ayton is the Leven, a tributary of the River Tees. A later addition of the word 'great' differentiates the village from nearby Little Ayton.

== History ==
In the 18th and 19th centuries Great Ayton was a centre for the industries of weaving, tanning, brewing, and tile making. Subsequently, whinstone for road surfacing was also quarried from the Cleveland Dyke along with ironstone, jet and alum from the Cleveland Hills.

Great Ayton was home to the Great Ayton Friends' School run by the Quakers, from 1841 until it closed in 1997.

The village serves as the base for Cleveland Mountain Rescue Team.

From 1974 to 2023 it was part of the Hambleton District; it is now administered by the unitary North Yorkshire Council.

== Geography ==
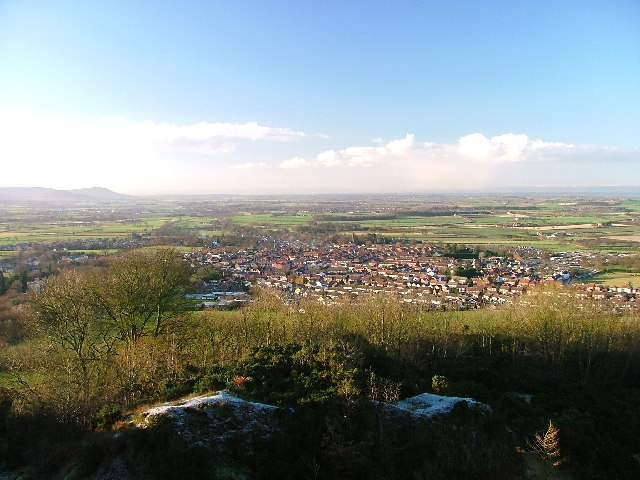
Looking south-west to Great Ayton from Cliff Ridge

Great Ayton is at the foot of the Cleveland Hills beneath Easby Moor and the distinctively-shaped Roseberry Topping. The River Leven, a tributary of the River Tees, flows through the village and links its two centres, High Green and Low Green. The Cleveland Dyke, a narrow band of hard whinstone rock that runs for about 31 miles between Robin Hood's Bay and Eaglescliffe lies to the north-east of the village.

The village lies near Middlesbrough's built-up area, south-east by less than 3 miles (4.8 km), 7 miles (11.3 km) from its centre. It is also 3 miles (4.8 km) north-east of Stokesley and 5 miles (8 km) from Guisborough. From 1894 to 1974, it was in the Stokesley Rural District of the North Riding of Yorkshire. The centre is 3/4 mile (1.2 km) from the nexus of Redcar and Cleveland, borough of Middlesbrough and the Hambleton districts. This is in keeping with the Langbaurgh hamlet as a historic meeting place of the Langbaurgh Wapentake.

An electoral ward of the same name stretches east to Kildale with a population of 4,973 at the 2011 census .

== Transport ==
The village is served by Great Ayton railway station on the Esk Valley Line.

== Landmarks ==
The village landmarks below all relate to Captain Cook.

- A granite obelisk now marks the original site of the Cook family cottage in Great Ayton. 'Cooks' Cottage' is now to be found in Fitzroy Gardens in Melbourne, Australia, having been dismantled in England and rebuilt in Australia in 1934. The obelisk is constructed from granite taken from Point Hicks, the first land sighted by Cook in Australia.
- The Captain Cook Schoolroom Museum is within a former charity school, founded in 1704 by landowner Michael Postgate. James Cook received his early education here from 1736 to 1740.
- Unveiled on 12 May 1997 on High Green is a statue depicting James Cook at the age of 16 looking towards Staithes where, according to tradition, he first felt the lure of the sea. This was commissioned by Hambleton District Council and is the work of sculptor Nicholas Dimbleby.
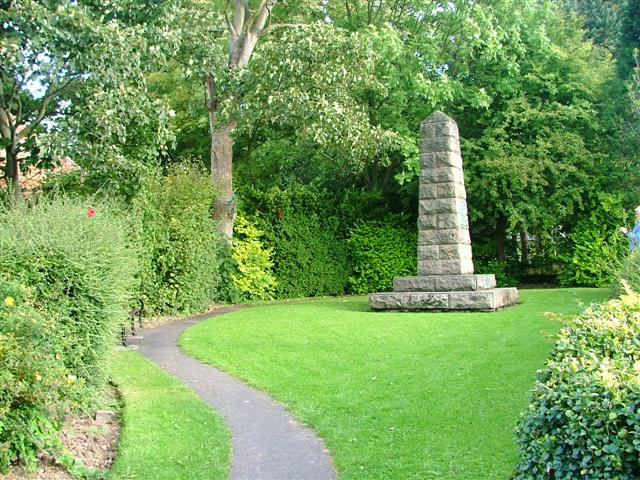
Cook family's Cottage obelisk

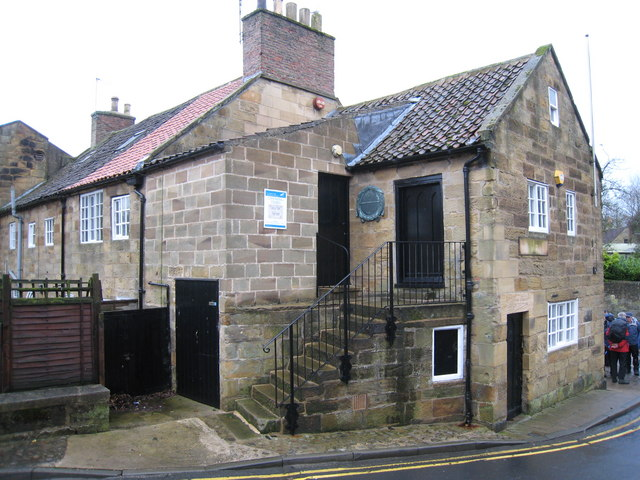
Captain Cook Schoolroom Museum

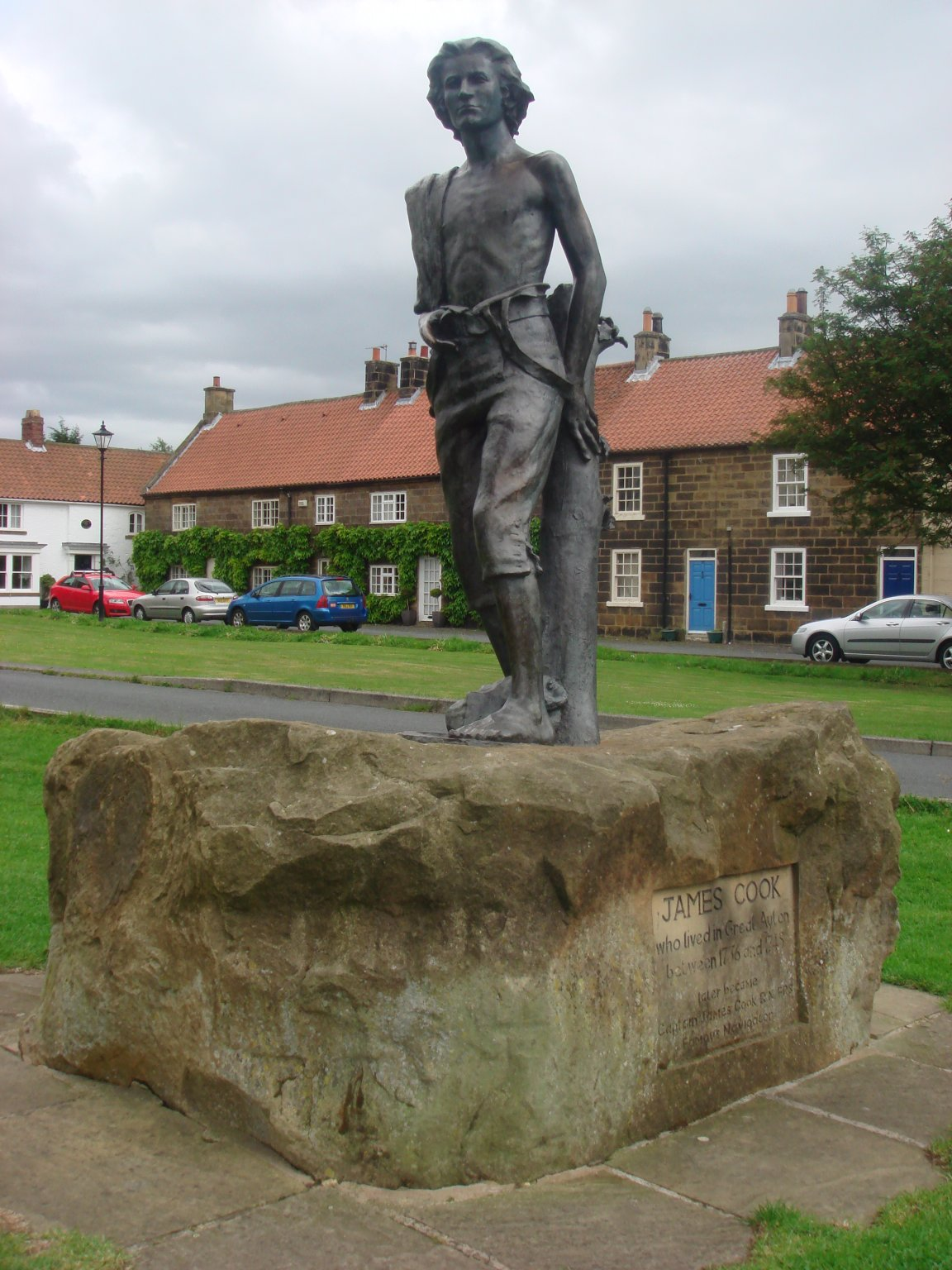
Statue of James Cook as a youth

== Religion ==
=== Anglican ===
The Church of England parish church of Christ Church was built in 1876 and now designated a Grade II listed building. It holds a number of services during the day that attract a total attendance of about 200. In the summer months, the evening service takes place in All Saints' Church, Great Ayton, the former parish church, which dates back to the 12th century. The church has an organ built by James Jepson Binns.

James Cook's mother and siblings are buried in the churchyard of All Saints' Church.

=== Methodist ===
The Methodist Church opened over one hundred years ago and has seen many developments over the years. In the 1960s, the ‘youth hall’ was built providing the church with facilities for events, activities, meetings and catering. The kitchen was improved to allow the preparation of full meals and later still a great deal of work was done to modernise and improve access to the building.

In September 2024, Easby Methodist Chapel and Great Ayton Methodist Church formally became one church on two sites under minister Rev Rob Weir.

=== Catholic ===
St Margaret Clitherow's Church is a chapel of ease served from St Joseph's Church, Stokesley. Until the 1960s, Catholics in Great Ayton worshipped at St Joseph's Church, Stokesley. In 1966, a Sunday mass was instituted in the ambulance station in the village. In 1970, a purpose-built timber-framed church was opened on Race Terrace, and in 1971 it was dedicated to Margaret Clitherow, becoming the first church in the world dedicated to the recently canonised saint. In 2002, part of the church was demolished, and a new octagonal building was constructed, the remainder of the old building being retained as a church hall. The new church was designed by DKS Architects and is in red brick with stone details, and a grey tile roof. Two stained glass windows were installed, with designs by Kyme Studios.

=== Society of Friends ===
The Society of Friends meets at the Quaker Meeting House, which is on High Green.

Meetings take place each Sunday at 10:30 am, as well as each Wednesday, 10-10:30 am followed by refreshments. A monthly half-hour silent contemplative meeting is held in Guisborough. See above for the Friends' former school.

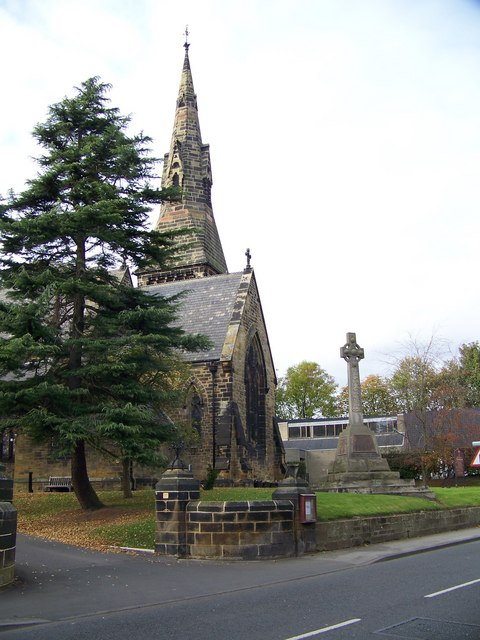
Christ Church

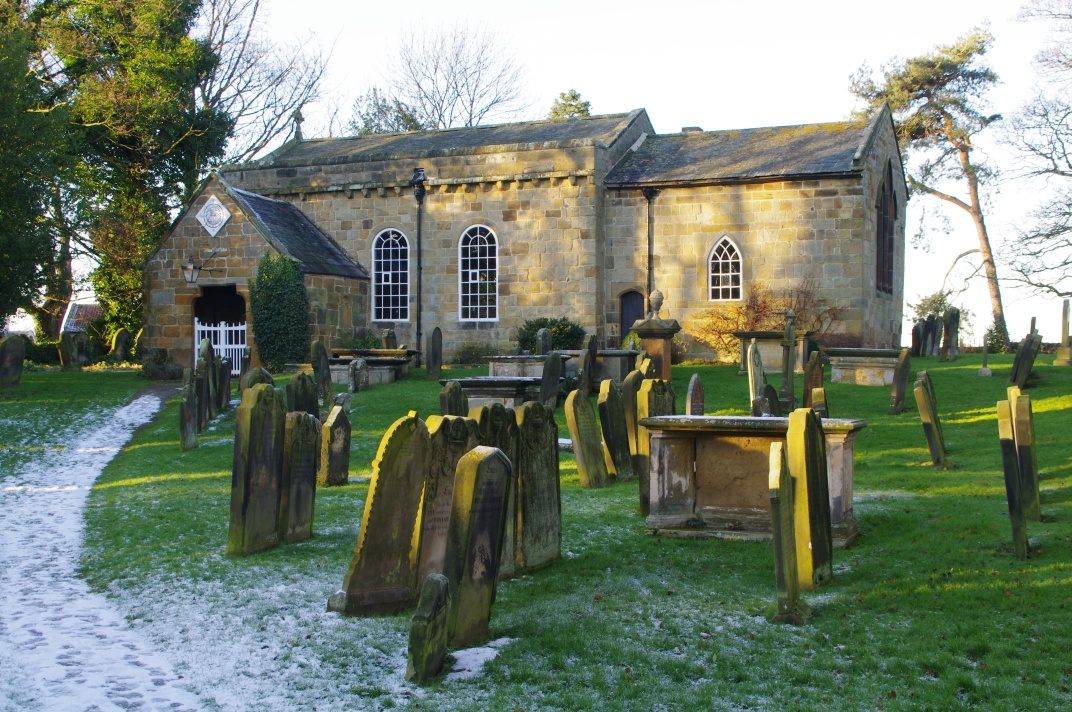
Church of All Saints

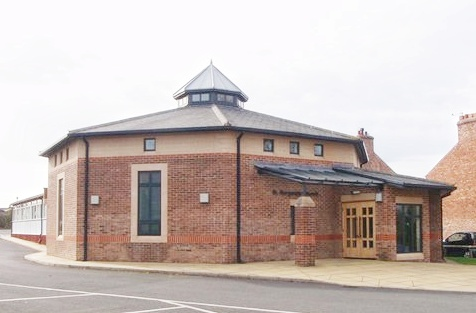
St Margaret's Church, Great Ayton

== Notable people ==
The village was the boyhood home of Captain Cook, the British explorer and navigator, who was born in nearby Marton. James Cook and his family moved to the village when he was eight years old and lived there until he was sixteen. The Cook family home on Bridge Street was built by James' father in 1755. The cottage was dismantled in 1934 to be shipped to Australia. Each stone was numbered so that the cottage could be reconstructed exactly in its new home in the Fitzroy Gardens in Melbourne.

Commodore William Wilson retired to Great Ayton in 1762, after a varied maritime career with the East India Company He lived there for over 30 years, and became friends with James Cook, who maintained his ties with the area.

Cyclist brothers Harry and Charlie Tanfield, were born in the village. They share a birthday, 17 November, 1994 and 1996 respectively.
