= Wainstones =

The wainstones may mean

- rocks at Hasty Bank in the Cleveland Hills
- rocks on the Bleaklow plateau in Derbyshire
