= 2025 Langdale Moor wildfire =

Wildfire in Yorkshire, England

Langdale Moor wildfire
- Part of 2025 United Kingdom wildfires
- Date: 11 August 2025 – 23 September 2025; 18:30 – (GMT)
- Location: Langdale Moor, North Yorkshire, England
- Coordinates: 54.35°N 0.65°W

Statistics
- Land use: Moorland

Ignition
- Cause: Unknown

Map
- Location of the fire

On the evening of 11 August 2025, a wildfire started on Langdale Moor near RAF Fylingdales in North Yorkshire, England. The fire continued to spread over the following days, with resources for fighting the fire pulled in from across the county and with support from neighbouring fire and rescue services. Smoke was detected up to 130 kilometres (80 mi) from the moors. An investigation revealed that the cause was most likely either a campfire or gas burner.

== Event ==
North Yorkshire Fire & Rescue Service (NYFRS) were first called out to the scene of the fire at 18:30 on 11 August 2025. The fire crews created a firebreak, but by Tuesday morning (the 12 August), they found the fire had jumped the firebreak and covered an area of 300 square metres (3,200 sq ft), which by the afternoon of the same day, covered an area of 1-square-kilometre (0.39 sq mi). By 13 August, the fire covered an estimated area of 5 square kilometres (1.9 sq mi) with 20 fire crews were in attendance; the fire was declared a major incident. Local residents were advised to close their windows due to smoke and the general public were asked to stay away from the area. Crews from the NYFRS attended from stations across the service area, some of which are a considerable distance from the scene, such as Tadcaster, Bedale, and Bentham, which is 166 kilometres (103 mi) from Langdale.

As the fire carried on into its fourth day, NYFRS announced that explosions may be heard in the area as the site was an old military training range, and the fire may detonate old munitions (the fire is near to the RAF base at Fylingdales, which was built on the old training area). A British Army explosive ordnance disposal (EOD) team were in attendance because of the unexploded ordnance, and a ban on live ammunition firing is in effect at Catterick Training Area due to a similar risk of moorland fires. A helicopter and a drone were used to survey the fire; the drone was supplied by the Humberside Fire and Rescue Service. The aerial footage allowed the fire crews to work out a containment procedure due to the threat of explosions, and local farmers assisted by spraying slurry onto the peatland to create firebreaks. (Note: The correct term for military explosives and ammunition is ordnance; some references within the article use the term ordinance which is a misnomer.) The helicopters were used to drop water on the fire.

The North York Moors Railway, which passes to the west of the seat of the fire, announced that they would not run steam trains along their line because of the risk of igniting another fire at their lineside which would further stretch the resources of the NYFRS. The fire also closed a campsite, necessitated some evacuations, and diverted coast-to-coast walkers away from the affected area.

On 14 August, NYFRS stated that they expected the fire to burn for "a number of days". By 15 August, the smell of smoke could be detected in York some 56 kilometres (35 mi) away, and the following day, it had reached Skipton which is 80 miles (130 km) distant from the fire. The fire has destroyed an area of special scientific interest (SSSI), and one expert stated that the moor could take "many decades, centuries or even thousands of years" to recover. On 21 August, the NYFRS predicted the fire would burn for another two weeks, and by the morning of 24 August, the fire's reach covered an estimated 20 kilometres (12 mi). During the night of 25 August, the fire spread northwards, and as a result, most of the staff working at Woodsmith Mine were evacuated and heavy smoke was affecting a section of the A171 road near to the Robin Hood's Bay turnoff.

By 27 August, the fire covered an area of 25 square kilometres (9.7 sq mi) with 60 firefighters and ten appliances deployed in an effort to combat the fire. NYFRS had announced that there has been at least 18 explosions of buried ammunition in the moor that has been detonated by the fire.

Alongside crews from NYFRS, assistance was required from fire and rescue services (FRS) across the UK to aid with fighting the fire. The FRSs which assisted NYFRS were Cleveland Fire Brigade, Greater Manchester Fire & Rescue Service, Humberside Fire & Rescue Service, Merseyside Fire & Rescue Service, Derbyshire Fire & Rescue Service, West Yorkshire Fire & Rescue Service, London Fire Brigade, Cumbria Fire & Rescue Service, Gloucestershire Fire & Rescue Service, Staffordshire Fire & Rescue Service, South Wales Fire & Rescue Service, Hereford & Worcester Fire & Rescue Service and Tyne & Wear Fire & Rescue Service.

The National Resilience crews which attended from other FRSs were released back to their own service areas from 4 September, and the major incident status of the fire was removed on 23 September 2025. However, in November 2025, access to large swathes of Fylingdales Moor was still restricted, and the fire service warned that areas of moorland would still be smouldering. Much of the moorland, including the long-distance paths (Cleveland Way and Lyke Wake Walk) were re-opened to the public in December 2025. It was noted that the fire had destroyed a significant amount of peat and had revealed more military ordnance left behind on the moor from previous training activity.

In February 2026, the North Yorkshire Fire and Rescue Service determined that the cause of the fire was either a campfire or a gas burner. The NYFRS stated that "the location of the original fire in June was "isolated", 90 minutes from any road and requiring specialist vehicles to attend." Firefighters had to use off-road vehicles and then walk 30 minutes to the seat of the fire.
