= Lyke Wake Walk =

Challenge walk in North Yorkshire, England

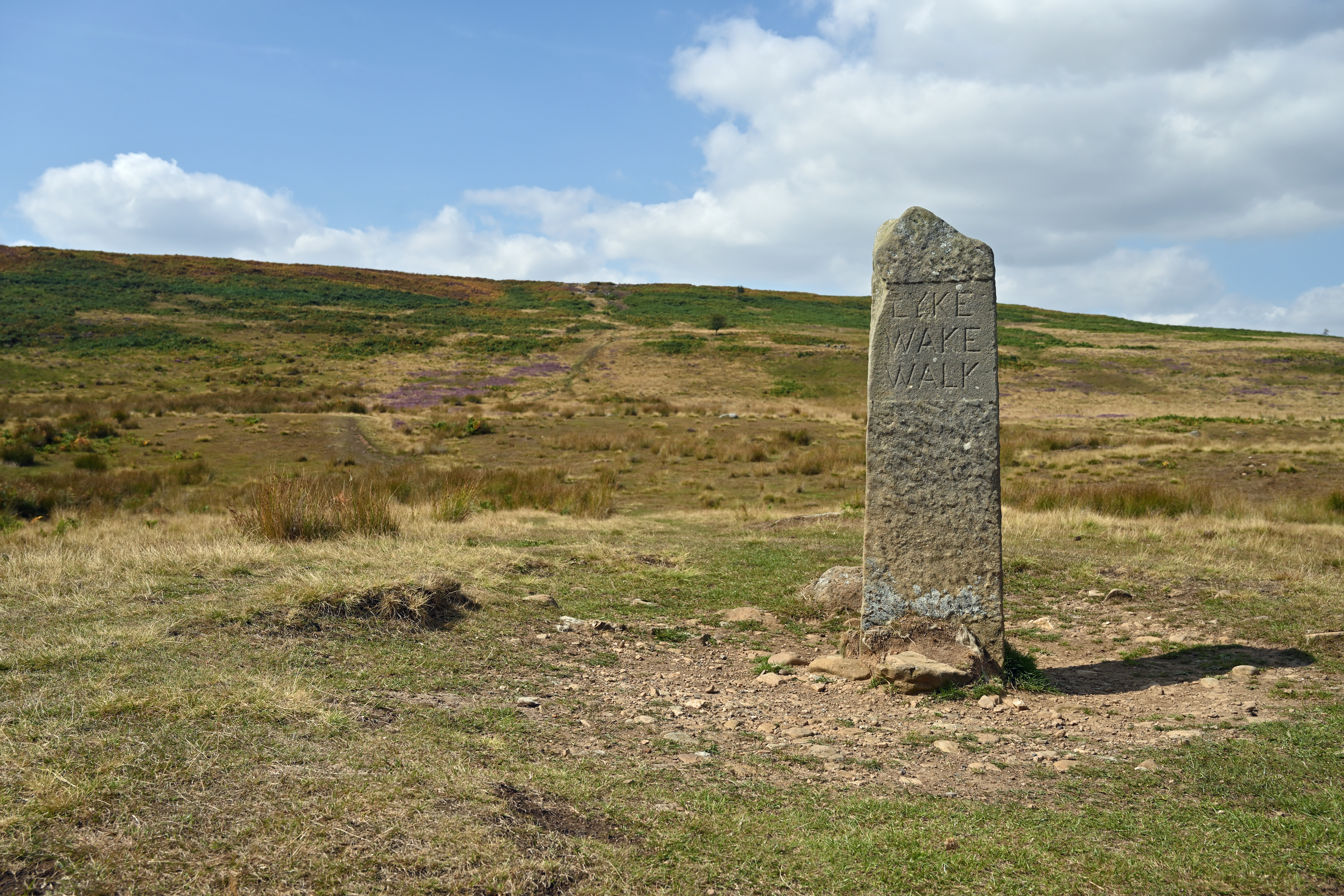
- Lyke Wake Walk stone at Sheepwash
- Length: 40 mi (64 km)
- Location: North Yorkshire, England
- Designation: Long-distance footpath
- Trailheads: Scarth Wood Moor, Osmotherley Beacon Howes/Ravenscar
- Use: Hiking
- Highest point: Botton Head, Urra Moor, 1,489 ft (454 m)
- Lowest point: Scugdale Beck, 410 ft (120 m)
- Difficulty: Moderate to strenuous
- Season: Year round
- Hazards: Bad weather

The Lyke Wake Walk is a 40-mile (64 km) challenge walk across the highest and widest part of the North York Moors National Park in North Yorkshire, England. The route is named after the "Lyke-Wake Dirge" and commemorates the many corpses carried over the moors on various old coffin routes and the ancient burial mounds encountered on the way. The name derives from a lyke, the corpse, and the wake, the watch over the deceased. Its associated club has a social structure, culture and rituals based on the walk and Christian and folklore traditions from the area through which it passes.

== History ==
The idea of a walk originated from an article in the Dalesman magazine in August 1955. Its author, Bill Cowley, described a 40 miles (64 km) walk across the North York Moors from east to west (or vice versa) on heather all the way except for when crossing one or two roads. Given the remoteness of the area, a lone walker might not encounter another during the one-to-two-day journey. Cowley issued a challenge to see if anyone could walk from Scarth Wood Moor at the western extremity of the moors to Ravenscar on the coast, keeping on or close to the main watershed of the moorland, in twenty-four hours. The first crossing was completed shortly afterwards, on 1 and 2 October 1955. Cowley was in the party that made the crossing in 23 hours and he wrote a book, Lyke Wake Walk, which he kept up to date by frequent revision. The book ran to twelve editions in the author's lifetime and sold many thousands of copies. It was revised in 2001 by Paul Sherwood.

Cowley's idea developed over the years before he issued the challenge in 1955. He wrote a poem, originally dated 1937, Storm Longing, describing walking on the moors and mentioning a number of the walk's landmarks (after the walk was established, he adapted the poem slightly to fit the actual Lyke Wake Walk better). His early contributions to the Dalesman appear, in retrospect, to hint at the idea of the walk drawing on his appreciation of the works of the archaeologist Frank Elgee, antiquarian and folklore expert Canon John Christopher Atkinson and author and rambler Alfred J. Brown.

== Route ==
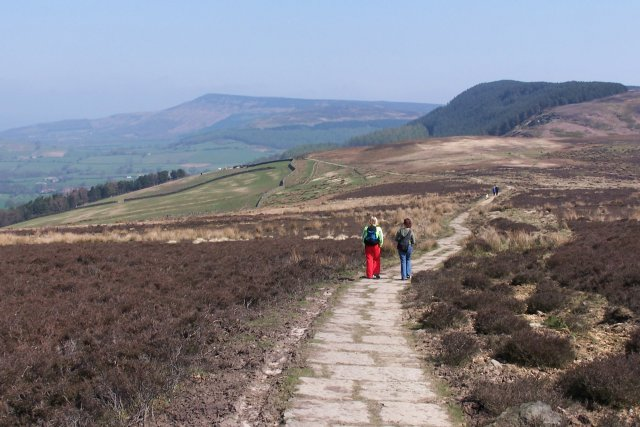
Scarth Wood Moor

The walk is usually done from west to east although it can be done in either direction. A successful crossing must be completed within 24 hours. There is no exact route but the Lyke Wake Club and its successor have rules regarding what can be considered a successful crossing. For record purposes the walk starts at its original departure point, the Ordnance Survey Trig point on Scarth Wood Moor, near Osmotherley (NGR: SE 459 997) and finishes in the bar of the Raven Hall Hotel in Ravenscar (NGR: NZ 981 018). For practical purposes the acceptable end points are the Lyke Wake Stone adjacent to Sheep Wash car park at Cod Beck Reservoir at the western end (NGR: SE 467 992) and Beacon Howes car park where there is a second Lyke Wake Stone at the eastern end (NGR: NZ 969 012). Successful crossings must stick to the moorland summits as far as practicable and walkers straying into Eskdale are disqualified. The route crosses the Stokesley-Helmsley road (B1257) between Point 842 (Clay Bank Top) and Point 503 (Orterley Lane end), the Whitby-Pickering road (A169) between Point 945 (Sil Howe) and Point 701 (near Saltergate) and the Scarborough-Whitby road (A171) between Point 538 (Evan Howe) and Point 579 (Falcon Inn). Point numbers are the height in feet above sea level as given on the one inch Ordnance Survey Tourist Map of the North York Moors (1970 edition); the metric equivalents are identified on the Landranger and Explorer Series maps.

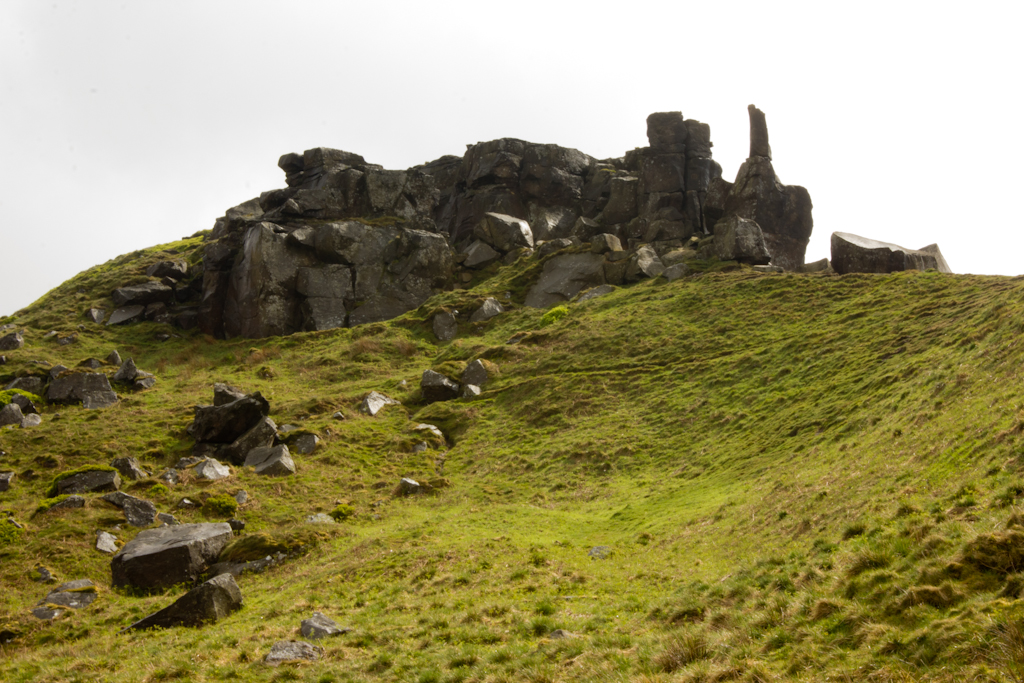
The Wainstones on Hasty Bank

The original route began at Scarth Wood Moor trig point, followed the Alum/Jet Miners Track from Live Moor to Hasty Bank, then to Smuggler's Trod, Bloworth, Ironstone Railway, Esklets, White Cross (Fat Betty), Shunner Howe, Hamer, Blue Man-i'-th'-Moss, Wheeldale Stepping Stones, Fen House, Tom Cross Rigg, Snod Hill, Lilla Howe, Jugger Howe ravine, Helwath, Pye Howe Rigg, to Ravenscar (Raven Hall Hotel). This route is no longer possible as a section is within the Ministry of Defence controlled area at RAF Fylingdales Early Warning Radar Station.

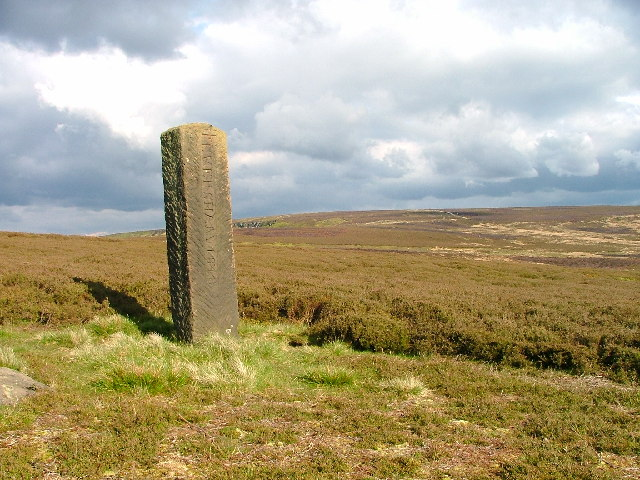
Boundary Stone, Urra Moor

Most crossings now follow the classic route, a variation of the original. It begins at Scarth Wood Moor trig point or the western Lyke Wake Stone in Sheepwash car park, follows the summit track from Live Moor over Carlton Moor, Cringle Moor, Cold Moor and Hasty Bank, Smuggler's Trod, Bloworth, Ironstone Railway, Esklets or South Flat Howe or Lion Inn, White Cross (Fat Betty), Shunner Howe, Hamer, Blue Man-i'-th'-Moss, Wheeldale Stepping Stones, Fen Bogs, Eller Beck, Lilla Howe, Jugger Howe ravine, Stony Marl Moor, to the eastern Lyke Wake Stone at Beacon Howes or Ravenscar. A summary description of the classic route with photographs is described by Richard Gilbert in his book, The Big Walks and a guidebook is available. A detailed illustrated description of the western half of the walk is given in Alfred Wainwright's A Coast to Coast Walk. The classic route and the main alternatives are shown in the map.

Map of the Lyke Wake Walk. There is no defined route; this map shows what is usually described as the classic route, and the main alternatives.

Most crossings are done west to east. The original challenge, crossing towards the sea in an easterly direction is thought to be easier because of the prevailing wind from the west making it easier to walk with the wind on one's back and with the heather lying away from the walker. On a west to east crossing, the major ascents and descents occur in the first ten miles when the walker is relatively fresh. A traverse of the Lyke Wake Walk route is referred to as a crossing and the act of participating in the walk is known as dirging.

In the first few years, the walk followed a difficult route requiring endeavour and physical endurance as there was no track over most of its length. From the mid-1970s the walk was re-thought because the numbers of people attempting it had, in places, eroded the ground surface, and disturbance to game birds, sheep and wildlife by walkers and their support parties at all times of day and night, particularly in Osmotherley, Ravenscar and at remote farms. Footpath erosion was compounded by the walk sharing long stretches of its route with the Cleveland Way and Wainwright's Coast to Coast Walk. Other users, some legal, some illegal, including mountain bikes, motor cycles, quad bikes and agricultural and moorland management vehicles exacerbated the problem. Alternative routes are possible and the walk club works with the National Park authority to try to limit environmental damage.

The Ordnance Survey no longer marks the walk route on maps at the recommendation of the National Park Authority, as a measure to discourage large numbers undertaking a crossing and the walk was not mentioned in National Park Authority publication for a number of years.

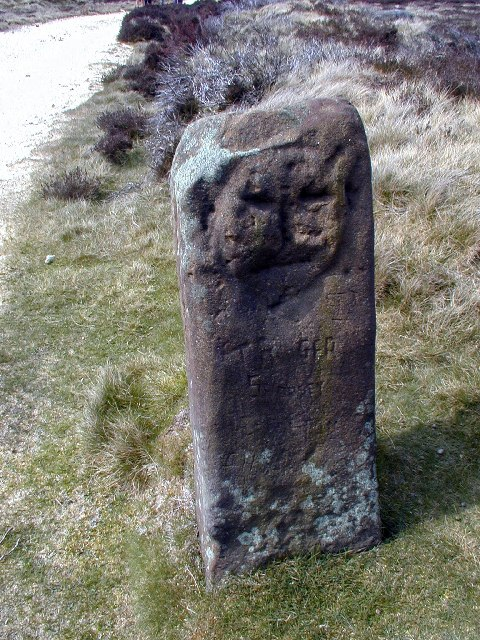
The Face Stone, on Urra Moor

=== Other long-distance walks in the area ===
Alternative challenge walks and trails include the Hambleton Hobble, the Shepherd's Round, the White Rose Walk, the Lyke Wake Way, the Monk's Trod, the Rail Trail, Hambleton Drove Road, the Crosses Walk and the long distance trails. A walk from west to east across the North York Moors around ten miles south of the Lyke Wake Walk from Gormire Lake to Cloughton Wyke termed, in a play on words, the Lake Wyke Walk has been suggested.

The Lyke Wake Way is a non-challenge alternative from Osmotherley to Ravenscar on public rights of way via locations where accommodation and other facilities are available. It entails 50 to 60 miles (80 to 97 km) of walking depending on the route taken and can be completed over two or three days.

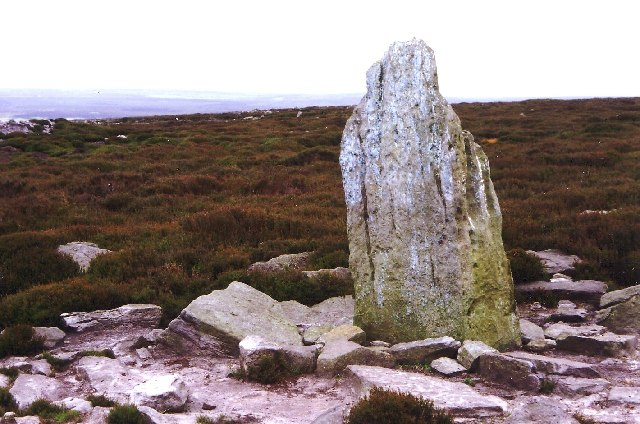
Blue Man i' th' Moss, Wheeldale Moor

Alfred Wainwright suggested the walk could form an acceptable finish to his Coast to Coast Walk but did not specify if he recommends doing the 40 miles (64 km) in a single push. There is no record of Wainwright completing the walk. There are no constraints on doing the walk in a more leisurely manner and a guide to doing the walk over four days has been published.

== Lyke Wake Clubs ==
The first Lyke Wake Club was formed immediately on completion of the first crossing. Those completing the first crossing were its foundation members.

The walk takes its name from the "Lyke-Wake Dirge", probably Yorkshire's oldest surviving dialect verse, which is about watching over the wake of the corpse (lyke). Cowley proposed linking the walk and the dirge before the first crossing had been completed. The song tells of the soul's passage through the afterlife. The walk does not follow a specific corpse road, although it has been suggested it does, though there is no historical or archaeological evidence for it. The physical challenge, possibility of bad weather and difficult conditions make the dirge an appropriate club song.

The club established its own culture and developed traditions based around the dirge, aspects of Cleveland history, superstitions and folklore, and rituals associated with suffering, death, funerals and the after-life that are broadly Yorkshire, northern English and Christian in character, with an acknowledgement of local folklore and the pagan forebears who originally inhabited the moorlands. Club meetings were termed "wakes" and the club badge was coffin shaped and decorated with the Ordnance Survey symbol for a tumulus (burial mound), many of which are found along the route. Its culture is of solemnity regarding issues of ritual, folklore and mortality but with light-hearted aspects relating to the self-inflicted suffering of participants undertaking the 40-mile (64 km) walk. Club membership was/is granted on submission of a written report of a successful crossing and entitles successful walkers to a membership card in the form of a black-edged condolence card bearing the club crest, a black coffin. Many crossing reports are humorous and in various forms including prose, poetry, maps, post-mortem reports, last wills and testaments, plays, etc., some of which are quoted in the many editions of Cowley's Lyke Wake Walk book and in a separate volume devoted to literature and artwork contributed by members. Female members are termed "Witches", males are "Dirgers".

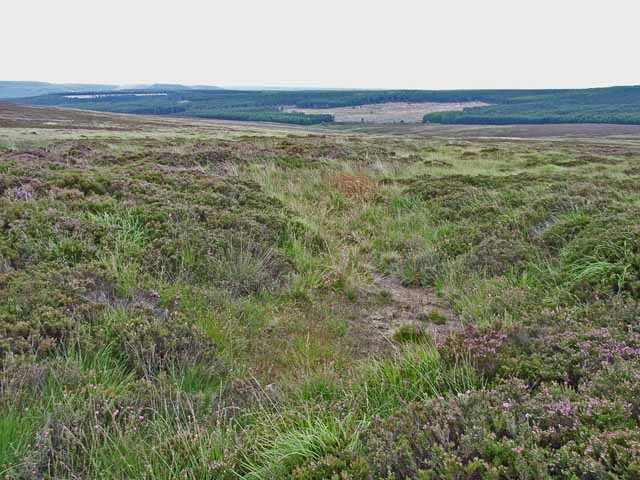
Typical Lyke Wake Walk terrain, Fylingdales Moor

The walk emerged when outdoor challenges and sponsored fund-raising events were becoming a feature of national life. It became popular and was considered a "rite of passage" for outdoor enthusiasts in Yorkshire in particular and across the north of England. It became a challenge for fundraisers for good causes. Reliable estimates, based on club records, put the number of people having completed a crossing at more than 250,000. Possibly more than 30,000 made more than one crossing, a significant number have completed it more than ten times and a handful have made more than a hundred. One estimate put the total number of crossings up to 1994 at one million, but this is not supported by records. The club celebrates walkers who have undertaken multiple crossings with awards called degrees acknowledging their knowledge of the route, the moorland and its culture. The club designated Cowley as "Chief Dirger" and other officers included a Melancholy Mace Bearer, Harassed Archivists, Melodious Minstrels, a Cheerless Chaplain, a Horrible Horn-blower and an Anxious Almoner. Degrees conferred include Master/Mistress of Misery, Doctor of Dolefulness and Past Master/Mistress. Walkers who completed more than one hundred crossings are referred to as Senile Centenarians and as of March 2016, four people have achieved this landmark.) The requirements for degrees are:

Degree	Crossings	Notes
Master/Mistress of Misery	3 (minimum)	Must have done the walk in both directions entitling the recipient to wear a black neckband at wakes and other functions.
Doctor of Dolefulness	7 (minimum)	Must have done walk in both directions including an unsupported crossing and a winter crossing in December, January or February. Must present a thesis at a wake on a subject relating to the walk or club, entitling the recipient to wear a purple neckband at wakes and other functions.
Past Master/Mistress	15 (minimum)	In addition to the requirements for Doctor status, the recipient must have performed "great services to the club" and be capable of "finding the way across any moor by day or night, whether drunk or sober without map or compass" entitling him/her to wear a purple & black boutonniere at wakes and other functions. It is awarded on an honorary basis by the club and cannot be applied for.

The New Lyke Wake Club has instituted the degree of "Purveyor of Purgatory" for leaders who have successfully, and without mishap, conducted three (or more) parties on the walk. It can be awarded in absentia but the other degrees are only awarded when the recipient is in attendance at a wake.

The walk's popularity owes much to Cowley's book which gives insights into the history, archaeology, geography, natural history, and folklore of the moors. The book describes the club and its culture in a tongue-in-cheek humorous style. Its first edition contained a list of the successful crossings up to October 1958. The possibility of inclusion in future editions together with the use of quotes from some crossing reports became an incentive to those taking on the challenge and inspired correspondents to be inventive and "attain literary heights".

Cowley died on 14 August 1994. The Lyke Wake Club which he founded closed in October 2005, the walk's 50th anniversary. A new club has been established – not without controversy – to preserve the traditions established by Cowley and take over the old club's functions of recording crossings, holding wakes and liaising with public authorities. The New Lyke Wake Club's activities have included donating funds to the North York Moors National Park young explorers conservation group, Cleveland Search and Rescue Team, and a short story competition for schools within the National Park. The new club maintains up-to-date route information on its website, funds footpath repairs and removes litter along the route, and gives grants to young club members for educational and outdoor pursuits purposes.

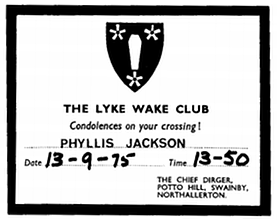
Lyke Wake Club Condolence Card

Both the original and new clubs' criterion for membership is the completion of a crossing within 24 hours, and there are no honorary, associate or corporate members. A concession is that anyone can claim an extra 12 hours for every five years over the age of 65 but, although there have been crossings by older walkers, some over eighty years old, there are only limited instances on record of any of them claiming the concession. In earlier years signing in/out books were kept at the Queen Catherine Hotel in Osmotherley and at Pollard Cafe in Ravenscar. The Lyke Wake Clubs have not monitored individual crossings for compliance with the rules, as Cowley stated "No one who is going to do this Walk is going to cheat, the satisfactions of crossing successfully are entirely for the individual".

== Lyke Wake Race ==
Once the route became established as a clear track, the Lyke Wake Club considered the possibility of holding a race. The first Lyke Wake Race was held in 1964 and was held annually on the nearest Saturday to 10 July (except 2001 when it was cancelled because of an outbreak of foot-and-mouth disease) until 2014, its 50th anniversary when the organisers ceased to be involved. In 2015, the race continued with the organisation undertaken by the Quakers Running Club. It has been held every July since, until the 2020 edition was cancelled due to the COVID-19 pandemic, resuming in 2022.

The first race was organised to coincide with the Osmotherley Summer Games. It started at Beacon Howes with the finishing line in Osmotherley. Both events were organised on the same date for a number of years. In the early years the Puckrin brothers, Arthur, Philip and Richard, were prominent amongst the leading runners with the first two brothers winning nine of the first ten races between them. Other winners have included prominent athletes/fell runners such as Joss Naylor. A history of the race up to 1981 has been given by Bill Smith. Since the Quakers took over the race, it has been held in an eastern direction, starting at Sheepwash and finishing in Ravenscar.

The tradition of the Lyke Wake Walk and Lyke Wake Race is that crossing times are rounded to next whole minute; seconds are not recorded.

The race is held under a handicap basis, with runners estimating their time beforehand and being given a different starting time on the estimation that all runners finish at the same time. Prizes are awarded for first male and female finishers and fastest male and female runners.

The race was first held in 1964, running from Ravenscar Beacon to Osmotherley. In 1976, due to moorland fires, the race was run out-and-back, starting in Osmotherley and taking in the first half of the traditional route. By 1998, the race was run from Sheepwash to Ravenscar, and in 2001 was cancelled entirely due to foot-and-mouth disease.

== Additional information ==
The walk has attracted media interest with television coverage, radio programmes and print articles. In its 60th anniversary year, 2015, the BBC Radio 4 feature Ramblings, hosted by Clare Balding, dedicated an episode to the Lyke Wake Walk with broadcast dates 4 June and 6 June 2015.

The archives, records and artefacts of the original Lyke Wake Club have been deposited in the North Yorkshire County Archives in Northallerton and Ryedale Folk Museum, Hutton-le-Hole.

The Lyke Wake Dirge has been set to music. One notable setting is part of the Serenade for Tenor, Horn and Strings by Benjamin Britten.
