= Fylingdales Moor =

Moorland in Yorkshire, England

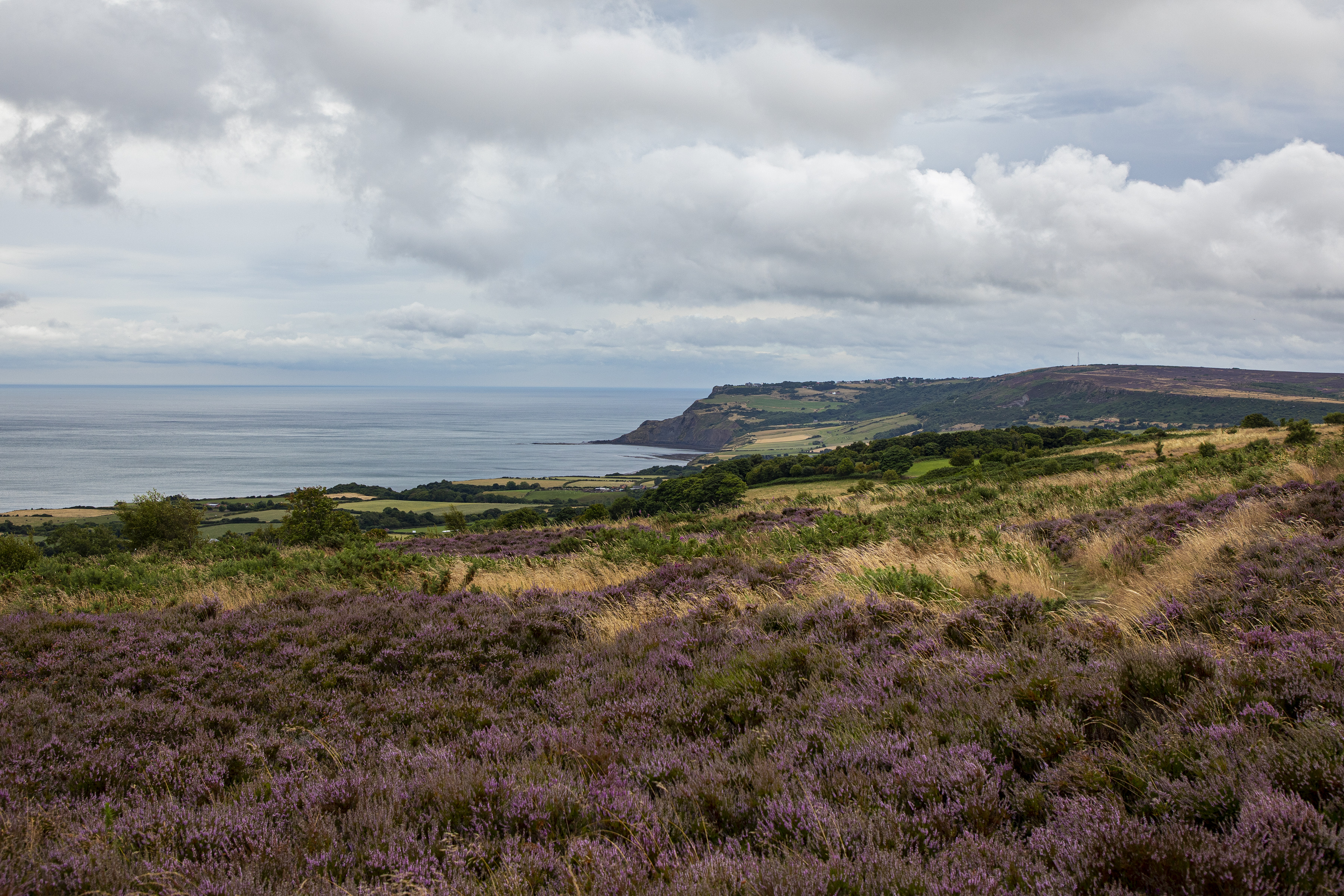
- Ravenscar from Fylingdales Moor

Highest point
- Peak: Stony Leas
- Elevation: 950 ft (290 m)
- Coordinates: 54.376°N 0.632°W

Dimensions
- Area: 6,700 acres (2,700 ha)

Naming
- Defining authority: North York Moors National Park Authority

Geography
- Country: England
- County: North Yorkshire
- OS grid: SE8898

Fylingdales Moor is part of the North York Moors in England. The moorland extends from the coast at Robin Hood's Bay, westwards inland to the military base of RAF Fylingdales and Goathland, northwards to Whitby, and in the south, Allerston Forest. Part of the moorland is also home to ancient bogland, such as May Moss which is 9,000 years old and has peat to a depth of 6 metres (20 ft). The highest point on the moor is at Stony Leas, 950 feet (290 m) above sea level.

== History ==
Fylingdales Moor extends westwards from Robin Hood's Bay and the coast south of there, across to Goathland and RAF Fylingdales, with the A169 providing a western border. The southern border has been traditionally seen as Allerston Forest, effectively with the River Derwent as a dividing line and across to Harwood Dale. The moorland covers an area of 6,700 acres (2,700 ha), and it forms the eastern edge of the wider North York Moors area. Historically, the moorland was part of several parishes, most notably Lands Common to Fylingdales and Haswker-cum-Stainsacre, and it was in the Wapentake of Whitby Strand in the North Riding of Yorkshire. The highest point above sea level to which Fylingdales Moor rises is at Stony Leas, some 950 feet (290 m).

The name Fylingdales first appears in 1086 in the Domesday Book referring to the settlement of Fylingdales and means the Settlement of the Fygela's people.

When the base of RAF Fylingdales was opened in 1963, 4 square miles (10 km^{2}) of moorland was lost to the station environs, but this in turn has protected some rare species of plant. The necessity for taking so much land was not to afford the space for buildings on the base, but because there needed to be a 1.2-mile (2 km) radiation hazard area spreading eastwards from the base; westwards was not an option as the A169 road was too close. The base has come in for a lot of criticism since it was built; some in terms of the role it undertakes with peace activists protesting outside the camp, but also under an aesthetic complaint in the three huge "golf ball" radomes that dominated the site. Paradoxically, the three golfballs "inspired some affection" and their replacement with the pyramidical SSPAR building led to another outcry. Nikolaus Pevsner described the three golfballs as "..three perfect white globes of great size on three perfect black plinths in the grandiose undulating silence of the moor."

Parts of the moorland used to come under the civil parish of Lands Common to Fylingdales and Haswker-cum-Stainsacre, (Note: Lands Common was an unusual term used only for Fylingdales Moor, Hamsterley Common and an area of Dartmoor.) which in 2015 had an estimated population of ten. Though many historical acts and enclosures have partitioned and given ownership of land, much of the moor was classified as waste, and so was left as common land. By 2021, the civil parish was simply titled Fylingdales and Haswker-cum-Stainsacre. Some of the moorland is owned and managed by the Strickland Estate, and general upkeep of the moorland is maintained by a court leet.

The moorland has a plethora of rock art stones scattered across both sides of the A171 road. Many of these have been documented, especially after a large moorland fire in 2003 (see below), which revealed Bronze Age stones, suggesting that human habitation on the moor stretches back over 4,000 years. The fire had some detrimental effects in that it damaged some of the rocks, either by moisture expanding in the stones from the intense heat, or the heat cracking thin layers of rock. Some damage may have also been down to water jets being sprayed directly onto the red-hot stone. However, a survey conducted after the fire, eventually revealed up to 200 rocks or cairn sites that were previously unknown to researchers. Other notable ancient effects are the many dykes that criss-cross the moor; a cross dyke at Grey Heugh Slack is 2,560 feet (780 m) long and 130 feet (40 m) wide, and Green Dyke, which is 9.8 feet (3 m) wide and 4,040 feet (1,230 m) long, but the most significant is the Cleveland Dyke, which extends across the moor from north-west to south-east and ends on Fylingdales Moor. The dyke is a whinstone ridge that, along with other places on the 270-mile (430 km) dyke, has been quarried for stone use across the moors. Most of the moorland is of sandstone overlain with "..soils [that] are too poor and the climate too cool for improvement to be worthwhile."

Crosses are present across Fylingdales Moor, as well as the wider North York Moors, but the most notable on Fylingdales Moor is Lilla Cross, which has been there since at least the 10th century, and it is the oldest type of cross on the North York Moors.

The River Derwent rises on Fylingdales Moor, and despite coming within 2 miles (3.2 km) of the North Sea, it meanders south and westwards to fall into the River Ouse, and thereby the Humber estuary. Many other smaller watercourses rise on the moor, with some eroding the peat and heather to reveal the sandstone, or the moorland grit underneath. Some of the tributaries of the Murk Esk rise on Fylingdales Moor, finding their way to the North Sea via the River Esk.

=== Military history ===
A large swathe of Fylingdales Moor was requisitioned for military training during the First World War, and again, in the Second World War, the moorland was used as a training area, and also included a decoy site for enemy bombers, as well as a bombing practise range. Walkers have been reminded over the years not to touch any metal objects they find on the moor. The amount of land used in the military training area was reduced by 950 acres (380 ha) to 28,190 acres (11,410 ha) in 1949. RAF Fylingdales covers an area of 2,000 acres (800 ha) of moorland, and the land falls within several areas of protection including SSSI, SAC and SPA. Before RAF Fylingdales could be built, the site needed to be cleared of ordnance; in 1958, two soldiers died in an explosion after one soldier picked up a shell on the ground during an exercise.

During the Second World War, the army and the RAF operated a radar station at Bent Rigg to the south of Ravenscar.

== Economic history ==
The main industry using the moor has been for grazing sheep, but other industries, such as grouse shooting have also taken place. In the Medieval period, ironstone was dug from the Upper Estuarine Series on the moor. Ironstone mining was largely confined to areas to the west and the north of the moor but quarrying was actively undertaken, particularly of the whinstone dyke which runs along the moor from the north-west to the south-east. In the 20th century, options were explored for a potash mine in the Hawsker area, but this was shelved in favour of a mine at Boulby further up the coast. However, in the 21st century, a mining venture for polyhalite was launched in the Sneatonthorpe area which became the Woodsmith Mine owned by Anglo-American.

== Transport and paths ==
The Old Salt Road, a path used by panniermen to carry goods from Robin Hood's Bay to the Saltersgate Inn on the A169 road on the western edge of Fylingdales Moor. The A171 between Scarborough and Whitby traverses the eastern edge of the moor close to the coast in places. The A169 has a public bus service, The Coastliner, which runs to and from Whitby five times a day in summer, and the A171 has a regular service connecting Scarborough with Whitby and Middlesbrough. Numerous holloways across Fylingdales Moor were uncovered after the Langdale Moor wildfire devasted parts of the moorland. These holloways were used until the turnpike was opened in 1760.

The Lyke Wake Walk crosses the moor, from Eller Beck bridge, just north of RAF Fylingdales, across Burn Howe Rigg, Jugger Howe Moor, and then Stony Marl Moor into Ravenscar.

The Coast to Coast path also crosses the moor at its northern end, going via Littlebeck, Sneathonthorpe, Hawsker and onto the Cleveland Way south into Robin Hood's Bay.

Two railways fringed the moorland; the Whitby & Pickering Railway ran along the western side of the moors near the A169 road, and is now preserved as the North Yorkshire Moors Railway. A second railway between Scarborough and Whitby stayed close to the coast, but curved inland through the moor between Ravenscar and Robin Hood's Bay.

== Flora and fauna ==
May Moss covers an area of 420 acres (170 ha) between RAF Fylingdales and Langdale Forest. The bog is over 9,000 years old and possesses peat to a depth of 20 feet (6 m). Typical moorland plants exist on Fylingdales Moor, such as calluna vulgaris and erica cinerea, with moorland pools being surrounded by juncus effusus. The moorland pools show evidence of heavy metal pollution, which is attributed to the moor's location near to the industries of Teesside and the former Aire Valley power stations. A survey on the former 'golf balls' area of RAF Fylingdales determined that the area has breeding populations of adders, slow worms and common lizards, as well as common toads.

=== Climate ===
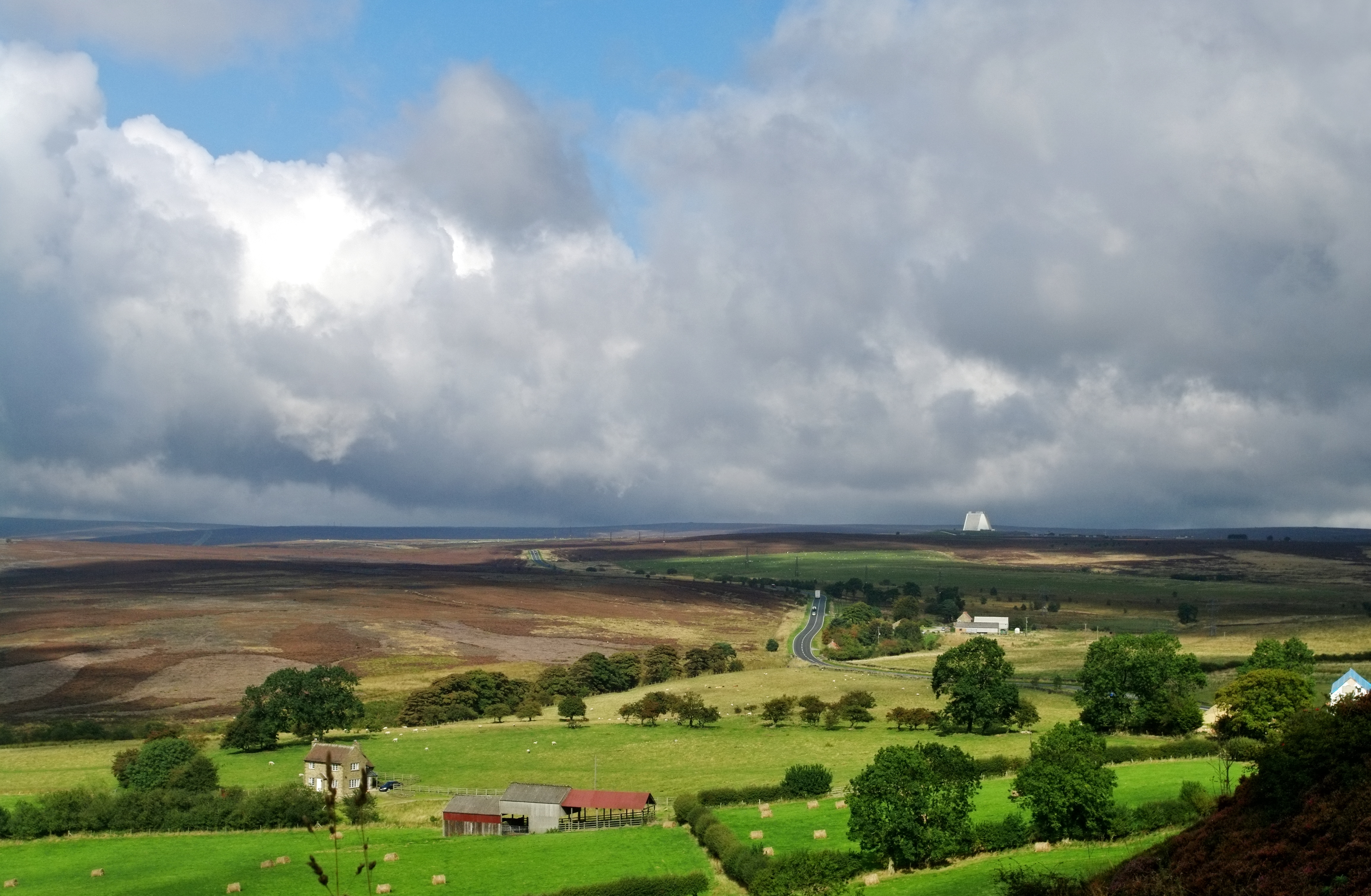
Fylingdales Moor and the BMEWS site at RAF Fylingdales

Climate data for Fylingdales (North Yorkshire): elevation: 262 m (860 ft) Average maximum and minimum temperatures, and average rainfall recorded between 1991 and 2020 by the Met Office. Sunshine hours are for Scarborough, as no data has been recorded at Fylingdales.
| Month | Jan | Feb | Mar | Apr | May | Jun | Jul | Aug | Sep | Oct | Nov | Dec | Year |
|---|---|---|---|---|---|---|---|---|---|---|---|---|---|
| Mean daily maximum °C (°F) | 5.1 (41.2) | 5.7 (42.3) | 7.9 (46.2) | 10.6 (51.1) | 13.6 (56.5) | 16.3 (61.3) | 18.7 (65.7) | 18.3 (64.9) | 15.6 (60.1) | 11.8 (53.2) | 8.0 (46.4) | 5.5 (41.9) | 11.5 (52.7) |
| Mean daily minimum °C (°F) | 0.4 (32.7) | 0.3 (32.5) | 1.9 (35.4) | 3.2 (37.8) | 5.7 (42.3) | 8.5 (47.3) | 10.6 (51.1) | 10.6 (51.1) | 8.8 (47.8) | 6.1 (43.0) | 3.0 (37.4) | 0.7 (33.3) | 4.96 (40.93) |
| Average precipitation mm (inches) | 85.3 (3.36) | 74.7 (2.94) | 66.6 (2.62) | 69.2 (2.72) | 55.6 (2.19) | 86.1 (3.39) | 66.0 (2.60) | 82.8 (3.26) | 81.2 (3.20) | 96.3 (3.79) | 119.0 (4.69) | 97.0 (3.82) | 979.7 (38.57) |
| Average precipitation days (≥ 1.0 mm) | 14.9 | 13.3 | 11.4 | 10.8 | 10.1 | 11.5 | 10.5 | 11.8 | 11.6 | 14.6 | 15.7 | 15.1 | 151.3 |
| Mean monthly sunshine hours | 56.3 | 83.5 | 117.9 | 164.8 | 213.8 | 189.3 | 201.3 | 188.5 | 142.5 | 101.9 | 64.9 | 54.2 | 1,578.8 |
Source 1: Met Office
Source 2: Met Office

In June 2007, 4.4 inches (111 mm) of rain fell at Fylingdales recording station. June has an average of 3.39 inches (86.1 mm).

== Fires ==
Deliberate fires are set alight on the moor under controlled burning programmes, though an order in the Middle Ages preventing the burning of thatche linge is possibly down to strands of heather that could be used for thatching. Part of the conditions for the major fire in 2003, is that the moorland had not been grazed since the Second World War, this allowed the heather to grow to knee height, and controlled burning off of the heather had not been undertaken for some time.

=== Wildfires ===
- April 1946 – around 4 miles (6.4 km) of moorland was on fire near Robin Hood's Bay
- September 2003 – an area of 5 square miles (13 km^{2}) was on fire requiring 100 firefighters. The fire lasted for two days.
- July 2006 – a blaze covering 163 acres (66 ha) closed the A171 and the B road to Ruswarp.
- March 2010 – an area of 74 acres (30 ha) of moorland was on fire, requiring 14 fire engines and sixty personnel to extinguish the fire.
- August to September 2025 - The Langdale Moor wildfire which at its height covered nearly 25 square kilometres (9.7 sq mi).
