= Lilla Cross =

Ancient cross in North Yorkshire, England

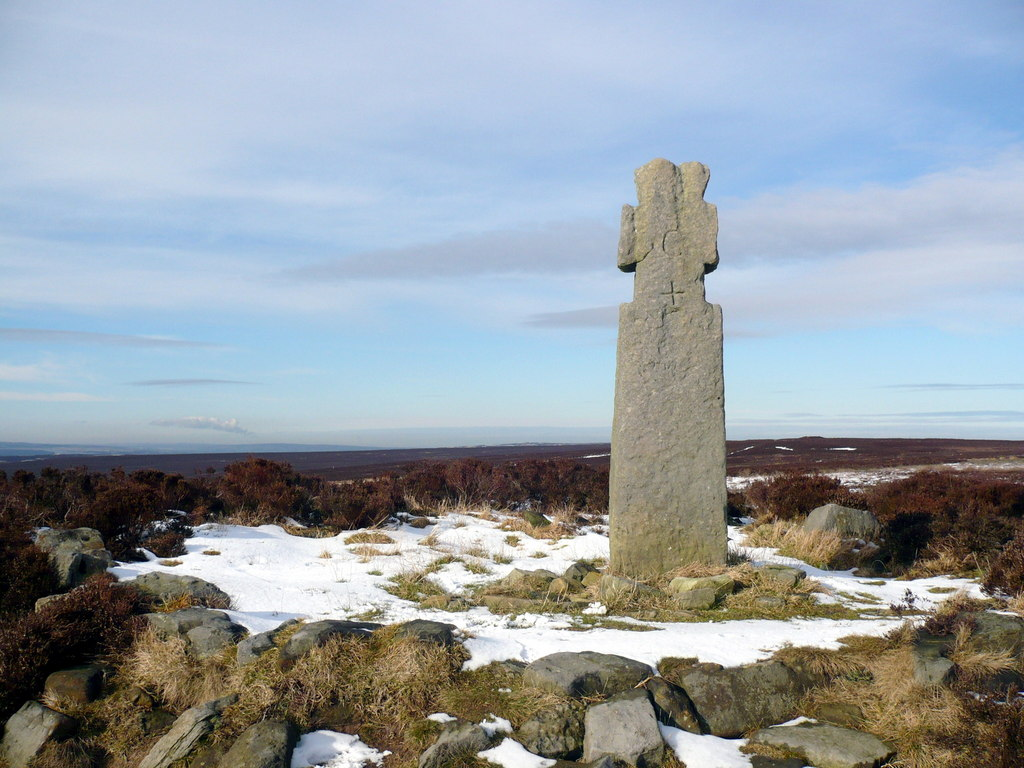
- The Lilla Cross

- Location within North Yorkshire
- 54.375°N 0.632°W
- Type: Stone cross
- Location: Fylingdales Moor, Goathland, North Yorkshire, England
- OS grid reference: SE889987

Site notes
- Elevation: 959 feet (292 m)
- Height: 7.5 feet (2.3 m)

Scheduled monument
- Designated: 23 February 1933
- Reference no.: 1010076

The Lilla Cross is a marker stone on Lilla's Howe, Fylingdales Moor, in North Yorkshire, England. King Edwin of Northumbria is said to have placed the cross there to mark the grave of Lilla, one of his thegns who saved his life during an assassination attempt. Whilst the current cross is believed to date to the 10th century, the original was placed there in 626. The Lilla Cross is the oldest marker of its type on the North York Moors. It marks the intersection of pathways across the moor, the edges of four parishes and is also a waymarker on the Lyke Wake Walk.

== History ==
The cross is located is on a hilltop known as Lilla's Howe, 959 feet (292 m) above sea level. This is a burial mound beside an old track known as Old Wife's Trod. Several paths met at Lilla Howe as the cross became a waymarker, especially for those trying to get overland from Whitby and Robin Hood's Bay to Pickering, (the path of the A169 road not being built until 1759). The Old Salt Road, and the Pannierman's Way both intersected at the cross, and the cross marked the meeting point of four ancient parishes, and the edge of ownership of Whitby Abbey. Currently, the Lyke Wake Walk goes past the site of the cross, but the amount of walkers undermines the peat, destabilising the cross, and both the cross and the walk need regular maintenance.

The origin story for the cross, and hence its name, is that of Lilla, a thegn of King Edwin of Northumbria, who is said to have prevented his master from being assassinated, and in doing so, was killed instead. He was believed to have been buried under Lilla's Howe in 626, with the cross marking the spot. Another part of the legend is that Lilla was a Christian, and so impressed with Lilla's behaviour, Edwin became a Christian too, being baptised by St Paulinus, and placing the cross on Lilla's grave to mark his resting place and sacrifice. Certain items of gold and silver dug up from beneath the Howe by the cross, were destroyed by enemy action in Liverpool in May 1942.

The original cross is known to have been placed there in the 7th century, however, the current cross is believed to date from the 10th century, and so is the oldest one of its type on the North York Moors. It was first mentioned in a document concerning a boundary charter from 1109. One section refers to Lilla Cros and another to Lillahou Cross. The gold and silver found underneath the cross, and the design of the cross itself, have been noted to be of a "post-conquest style".

In 1952, Fylingdales Moor became a military training area, so the cross was moved to Simon Howe to keep it from harm. After the military had finished training there, the cross was replaced in its original position. As it is quite close to the warning station of RAF Fylingdales (the cross is on the boundary of MoD land), contrasts have been drawn between the two structures, which are quite close to one another.

The cross is 7.5 feet (2.3 m) high and is styled in a "Maltese form". It marked the traditional boundaries for the parishes of Fylingdales, Goathland, Lockton and Allerston. A letter G is carved on the north side, and a letter C on the south side; both annotating parish markers. The war memorial in Goathland village, some 5 miles (8 km) to the west, is a replica of the Lilla Cross.
