= Frank Elgee =

Archaeologist and geologist from Northern England

- Born: Frank Watson Elgee; 8 November 1880; North Ormesby, Yorkshire, England
- Died: 7 August 1944 (aged 63); Alton, Hampshire, England
- Scientific career
- Fields: Archeology; Geology

Frank Watson Elgee (born 8 November 1880 in North Ormesby (Middlesbrough) Yorkshire, England) was a published archaeologist, geologist and naturalist. He wrote several books on the North York Moors such as The Moorlands of North-Eastern Yorkshire (1912), The Romans in Cleveland (1923) and Early Man in North East Yorkshire (1930). In 1933 Leeds University conferred on him an Honorary degree of Doctor of Philosophy.

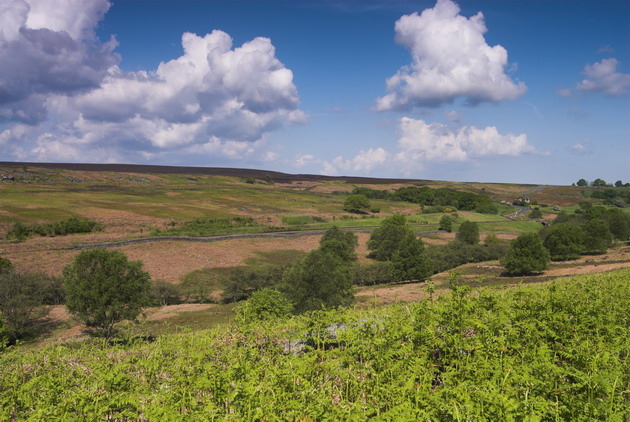
The North York Moors national park

== Early life and career ==
He was born in Kings Road, North Ormesby the eldest of four children – Frank Watson (1880), Allan (1883), Edward (1885), and Amy Maria (1887–1942). His father, Thomas (1851–1939) was Clerk and Bookkeeper at the local Pig iron works. His mother, Jane née Coates (1851–1907), was in poor health but dealt with his early education and he attended the local Public Elementary School in North Ormesby. In 1887 he went to Derwent Street Board School and then in 1893 'The Higher Grade School' that had just opened, later known as 'The Hugh Bell [Higher Grade] School' with his brother Allan, on the corner of Albert Road and Grange Road in Middlesbrough.

In May 1888 he caught scarlet fever, resulting in his becoming short sighted and partially- deaf.

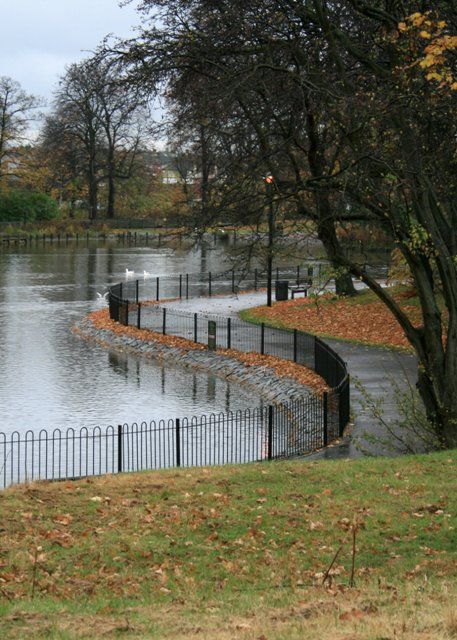
Albert Park, Middlesbrough

In 1892, his family moved to Middlesbrough and it was Albert Park that became his source of interest and his playground. It was here that he contracted pneumonia that rendered him very weak with empyema. For many years he had to use a bath chair.

In 1895 he worked at William Jacks & Co, Iron Merchants. This was after a further period of ill health when he was unable to take examinations. In April 1897 he had to leave to have a serious chest operation at North Riding Infirmary. He remained for only a short period and being very weak he was carried by his father so he could die at home.

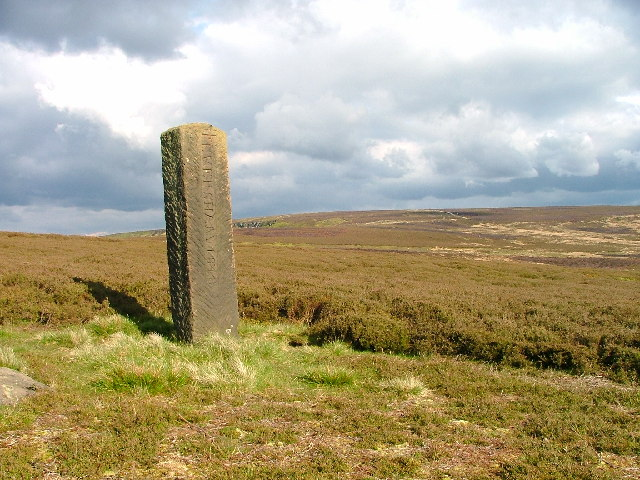
Boundary Stone at Urra Moor

His will to live was strong and he was taken to recuperate at Ingleby Greenhow near the foot of Urra Moor, North York Moors national park's highest point, here he took in the sights of the North Eastern moorland, the blue escarpments, the plant life, insects, birds and observed the Cleveland Hills from his wheelchair.

It was Ingleby Greenhow's Vicar, The Reverend John Hawell - who was a natural history specimens collector, the choncology section secretary of "Clevelands Naturalists' Field Club" and later President in 1891, 1895, 1896, 1903 and 1904 – that attracted him to the subject. He joined the Cleveland Naturalists' Field Club on his return to Middlesbrough, becoming Honorary Assistant Secretary in 1899 until 1906 before he became Honorary Secretary in 1907 until 1921 then President in 1922 and 1923 – he was a vice president from 1924 until 1932. During the time he was not in work, he taught himself the languages Latin, French and German in addition to studying Botany, Geology, Conchology and Astrology. This three-month stay was a defining moment of his life, he resolved to investigate and understand the area's origins that increased and fired his curiosity. The areas near Eston Nab were close by and the main place for his future investigations.

He received a prize from The Northern Weekly Gazette for the best contribution on entomology or astronomy. He used this towards bus and train fares or to pay for a night's lodging at a remote moorland farm. This allowed him to cover the whole of the northeast moorland. Frank could investigate the moors in the summer and in the winter, and during bad weather, he would read and write keeping a careful record of his travels and investigations, and maintain his diaries – he referred to this as 'dry work'.

== North York Moors and Dorman Museum ==
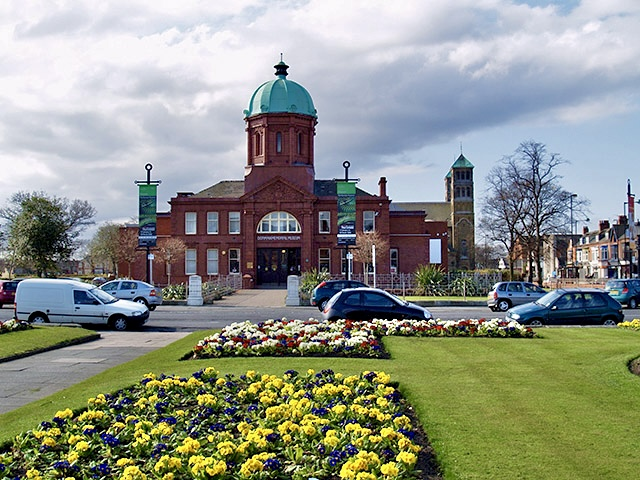
Dorman Museum

In 1904 Frank became Assistant Curator to the Dorman Museum and he held this post until 1923 when he became Curator. He then carried out carefully planned work that allowed him to cover greater distances across the 400 square miles (1,000 km^{2}) of the moors. In 1905 he elaborated in a speech to the Yorkshire Naturalists Union an account of the 'Problems of the Fauna of North-east Yorkshire'.

By 1907 he started writing and compiling information for his first book. After being unhappy about the outcome, he altered and rewrote the composition in 1910, revised again both in the winter of 1911 and again the following year. His book, The Moorlands of North-East Yorkshire, a regional survey that was the first published in the area.

The Yorkshire Post commented on Elgee's work 'The Moorlands of North East Yorkshire': 'Elgee may by his several studies historic and natural historical be conceded rights of pre-eminent domain over the moorlands of North Eastern Yorkshire, and he has added to his rights by this substantial and handsome book.'

In 1907 he read to the Cleveland Naturalist Field Club about The Origins of Cleveland Moors 'The Fauna of Cleveland Past and Present'. He also had published in 'The Naturalist' his findings and views on 'The Driftless Area of North-eastern Yorkshire and its Relationship to the Distribution of certain plants and animals, and Glacial Survivals'

The Blue Man-i'-th'-Moss stands on Wheeldale Moor and the name came from the Celtic word, Maen, meaning a 'standing stone'. Frank Elgee did consider that the Blue element of the stone's name came from the Cornish Plu which means 'parish as the Blue Man' acting as a boundary stone for the parish. The Moss part of the name is because the area can be extremely boggy. Frank Elgee at The High Bridlestones.

Former Village Shop in Commondale

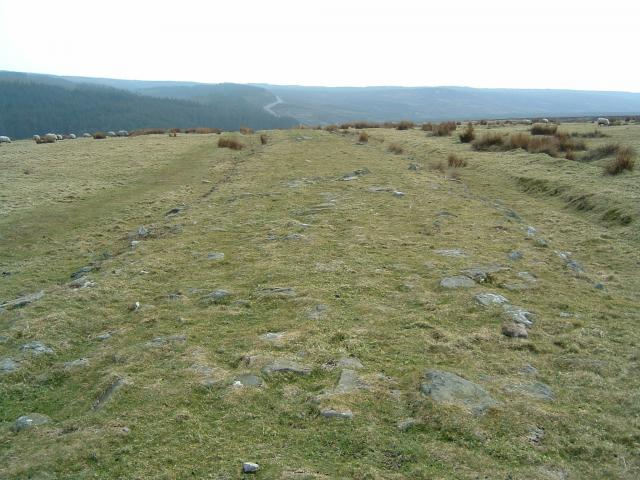
Wade's Causeway

He lived from 1920 to 1931 with his wife Harriett Louisa née Wragg (1881–1972) – they met in Danby in August 1911 whilst on holiday and married in July 1914 in Middlesbrough – in the small village of Commondale on the North York Moors along the road between Kildale and Danby, North Yorkshire. He would travel to work on The Esk Valley Line from Commondale railway station.

Frank Elgee became Curator of the Dorman Museum, Middlesbrough, in 1923, having been Assistant Curator since 1904. At this point he had turned his attentions mainly to Archaeology. In 1923 he published a handbook called 'The Romans in Cleveland' compiling a catalogue of the antiquities of North East Yorkshire. He published two books, the first in 1930 'Early Man in North East Yorkshire', and together with his wife Harriett, wrote 'Archaeology of Yorkshire'.

He was instrumental in the excavation of the Iron Age Hillfort at Eston Nab. Frank Elgee as curator of the Dorman Museum, in 1927, uncovered parts of an earthenware cremation urn, together with burnt bone and Flint. These possibly dated from 1800 BC. He discovered The Sleddale Stone Circle, Wayworth Moor, Cleveland. This is 30 yards in diameter and contains 16 stones each about 3 feet high, of which only six remained standing.

In 1929 Elgee reported on excavations at Eston Camp. These were carried out by subscriptions from members of the Cleveland Naturalists' Field Club. Seven weeks work through up information on the age and form of construction. Trenches revealed stone rubbers, quartzite Hammer-Stones, burnt sandstones, flint scrapers and chips. Fragments of calcined human bones, lines of sandstone blocks, an arrowhead of black chert, three stone discs, reddish pottery, a stone chopper, pear-shaped stones probably used in slings – all found on the south side of the higher central camp. A late Bronze Age was given for Eston pottery.

In 1933 Frank resigned as Curator due to ill health and his wife Harriett Wragg Elgee was appointed Curator, holding that position until 1938. Whenever possible he still played an active part in the development of the museum and led groups to Orkney and Holy Island, Anglesey. In 1937 he organised the excavation of the burial mound at Loose Howe but his failing health meant that the work was largely directed by his wife. In 1933 his work was recognised and he was awarded an Honorary Ph.D. by Leeds University. He was elected an Honorary Member of the Yorkshire Philosophical Society in 1936. In 1938, Dr. Frank Elgee and his wife Harriett moved to Alton, Hampshire, though he continued to communicate with his former local archaeologists right up until his death in 1944. His move because of deteriorating health was to be in a warmer climate.

He was also a keen student and recorder of the North Yorkshire dialect and wrote poetry in the local dialect. The 'pannierman' is a poem about bygone life on the North York Moors, and refers to Pannierman Causeway and Wade's Causeway. A member of the 'Yorkshire Dialect Society' he wrote the poem 'An Inheritor of the Earth'.

The Dorman Museum has material including a library of archaeological journals and photographs taken by Frank Elgee during his excavations. Principally at the Bronze Age hill fort at Eston Nab and burial grounds at Loose Howe. A Dugout canoe recovered from the River Tees at a depth of eight feet in 1926 is on view at the museum. There is only one item from Creswell Crags held at the museum. A single quartzite pebble from Pin Hole.

== Books, papers and poems ==
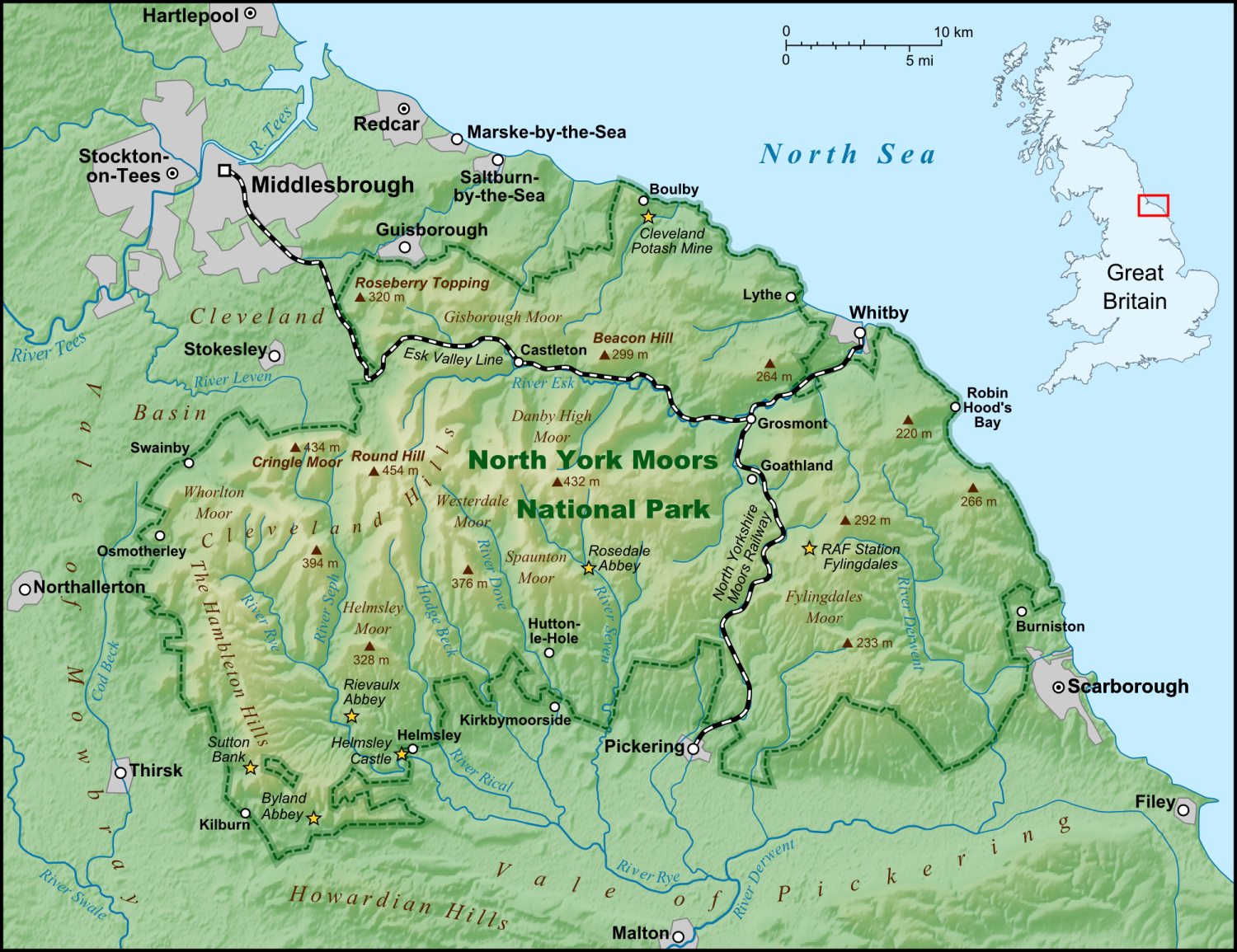
North York Moors map

- The Archaeology of Yorkshire – Frank Elgee, Harriet Wragg Elgee – F. & H.W., Methuen: London 1933.
- Archaeology of Yorkshire (County History Reprints) by T. G. Manby, Frank Elgee and Harriet Wragg Elgee
- The Moorlands of North-Eastern Yorkshire, their natural history and origin – Frank Elgee, F.G.S. – A. Brown & Sons, London, 1912
- The Moorlands of North-Eastern Yorkshire – By (author) Frank Elgee F G S – Publisher BiblioLife – September 2009
- The Moorlands of North-Eastern Yorkshire: Their Natural History and Origin (Classic Reprint) – By (author) Frank Elgee – Publisher Bibliolife – September 2015
- The Moorlands of North-Eastern Yorkshire – Scholar's Choice Edition – publication, The United States – February 2015 (no copyright owned) – created by Frank Elgee
- The Moorlands of North-Eastern Yorkshire: Their Natural History and Origin – Hardpress Publishing, United States – August 2012 – created by Frank Elgee
- Journal of Ecology – The Vegetation of the Eastern Moorlands of Yorkshire pp1–18 – Frank Elgee – British Ecological Society (March 1914)
- Early Man in North-east Yorkshire - Frank Elgee - John Bellows: Gloucester 1930.
- The Romans in Cleveland - Frank Elgee, 1923
- Official Guide. Edited - by Frank Elgee (1909)
- The Fauna of Cleveland past and present by Frank Elgee (1909)
- Scarth Wood Moor, Yorkshire, N. R. ... With maps and illustrations, etc. by Frank Elgee (1936)

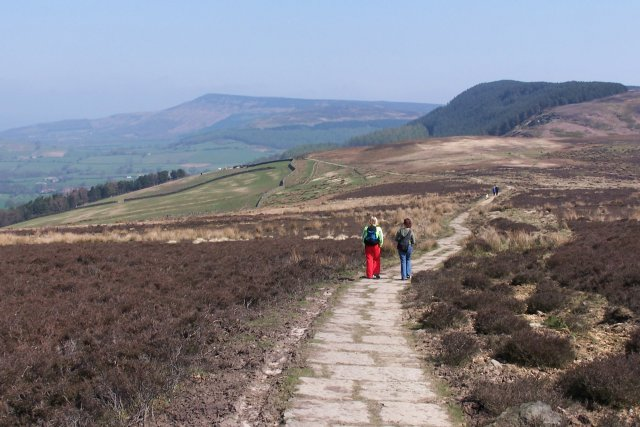
Scarth Wood Moor

- The Antiquarian Journal – Frank Elgee
- Yorkshire: The Country Archaeologies – by Frank Elgee and Harriett Wragg Elgee
- Bronze Age Burial in a Boat Shaped Coffin – by Frank Elgee and Harriett Wragg Elgee
- The 'Pannier Man', Ah can't mak nowt o' Life, Parting – Poems by Frank Elgee

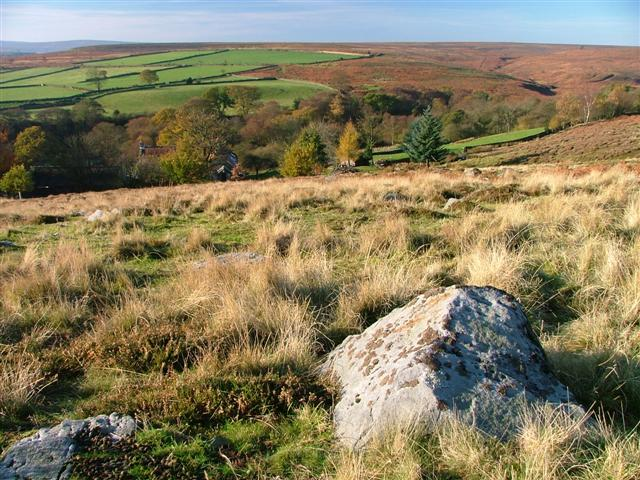
View from Pannierman's Causeway above Rosedale Intake

- Poems from Black-a-more, inc Childless and Inasmuch, by Harriett Wragg Elgee
- A Man of the Moors – Extracts from the diaries and letters of Frank Elgee (references to the countryside around Great Ayton) – Assembled by Harriett Wragg Elgee in 1957 and compiled by Geoffrey G Watson – Roseberry Publications, Middlesbrough, 1991
- The Collected Papers of Frank Elgee – Appleyard (1909)
- Papers relating to finds of stone axes and pottery and archaeological papers – Held by Yorkshire Archaeological Society – MSS 1539, 1590 and MSS 987–9, 1048, 1076 – Elgee, Frank (1880–1944):
- THE GLACIFICATION OF NORTH CLEVELAND – Elgee Frank – extract
- Letters written in wartime: XV-XIX centuries (The World's classics) by Harriet Wragg Elgee (1915)
- Diaries - Dorman Museum, not available at The National Archives by Frank Elgee

== Death, memorials, epitaph and lasting legacy ==
Dr Frank Elgee died on 7 August 1944 in Alton, Hampshire; he was 63 years old. He was succeeded by his wife Harriet who worked with him and helped him as his health faded. She had hoped he could be brought back to be buried on his beloved moors but was laid to rest on a hill in Alton Cemetery. Elgee's grave was renovated in 2016 as it was in a dilapidated state.

Elgee's wife Harriett gave her epitaph – 'His labours had been Herculean; his physical strength was nothing but frailty; his monetary resources were meagre and he stands for the triumph of mind over body; of spirit over matter, a scholar saint of Yorkshire Moorlands; as having entered fully into his rights of pre-Eminent domain as their Genius loci, unto whom all is revealed'.

The Frank Elgee memorial was erected in 1953 at Blakey Ridge on the North York Moors, overlooking Loose Howe at Rosedale Head, Rosedale, North Yorkshire. The commemorative memorial stone to Frank Elgee, erected by Yorkshire Archaeological Society, carved by Danby Mason, Mr F Weatherall, is positioned near 'Ralph's Cross' on the highest point of the Moorland Road from Castleton, North Yorkshire to Hutton-le-Hole, over Blakey Ridge.

Elgee Memorial Lectures are held at The Dorman Museum every year.

The Dorman Museum, opened in 1904, also has a green plaque dedicated to Frank Elgee the curator between 1923 and 1932.
