= Cringle Moor =

Hill in Yorkshire, England

Coordinates: 54.41871°N 1.17397°W

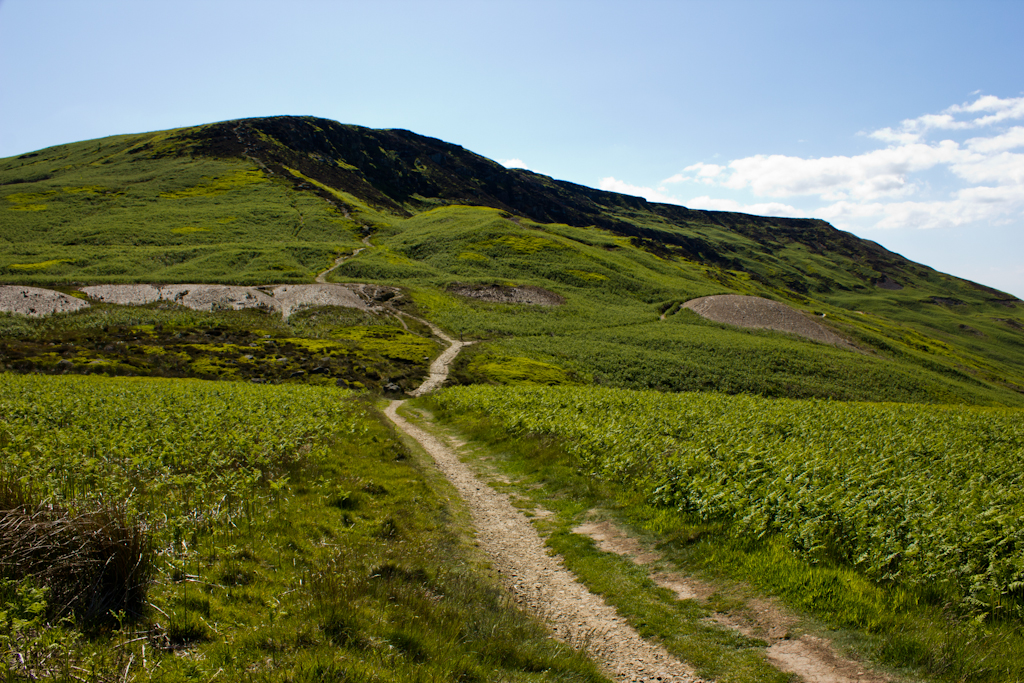
- Cringle Moor seen from the east

Highest point
- Elevation: 434 m (1,424 ft)
- Prominence: 175 m (574 ft)
- Listing: Marilyn

Geography
- Location: North York Moors, England
- OS grid: NZ537029
- Topo map: OS Landranger 93

Cringle Moor (also known as Cranimoor), at 432 m (1,417 ft), is the third-highest hill in the North York Moors, England, and the highest point west of Clay Bank.

The hill is crossed by the Cleveland Way National Trail and is a part of Alfred Wainwright's Coast to Coast Walk, which also passes over the neighbouring tops of Cold Moor, Carlton Moor, Live Moor and Hasty Bank — a section of the walk which Wainwright described as "one of the finest". It is also part of the Lyke Wake Walk.

Just to the west of the summit is the burial mound of 'Drake Howe (Howe is an Old Norse word meaning "burial mound"). This Bronze Age burial mound is now a scheduled ancient monument.

== Gallery ==
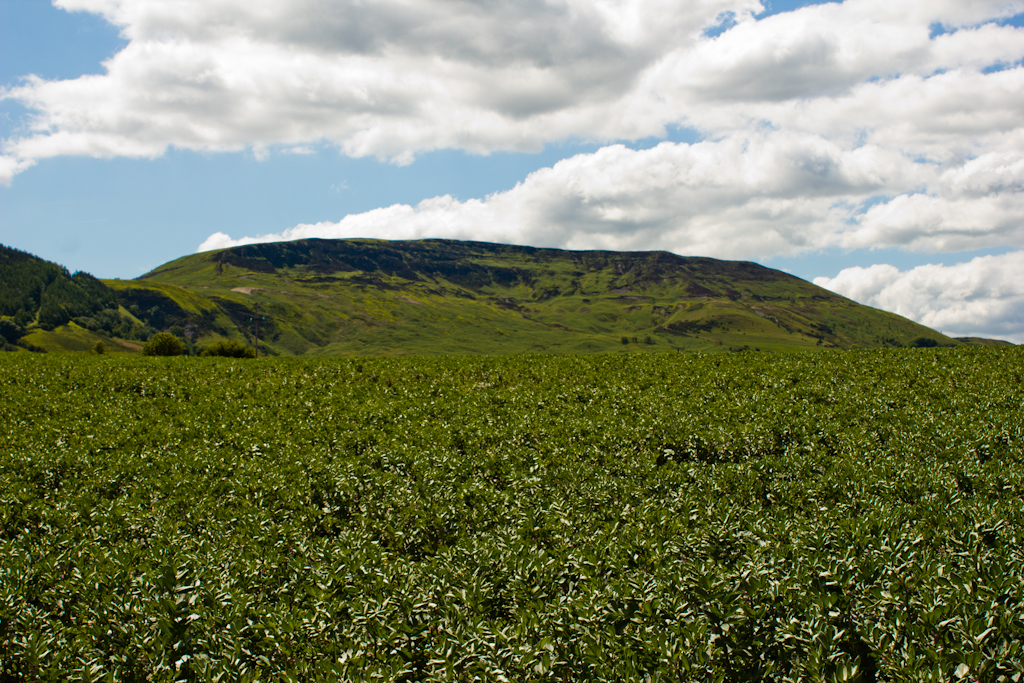
Cringle Moor from Bank Lane

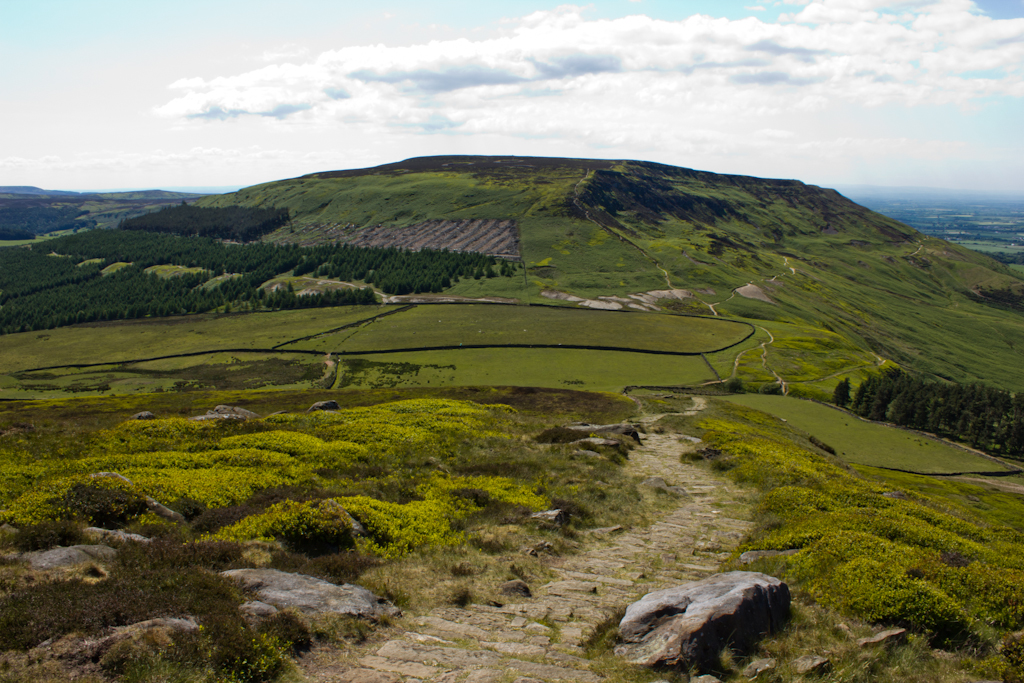
Cringle Moor from Cold Moor

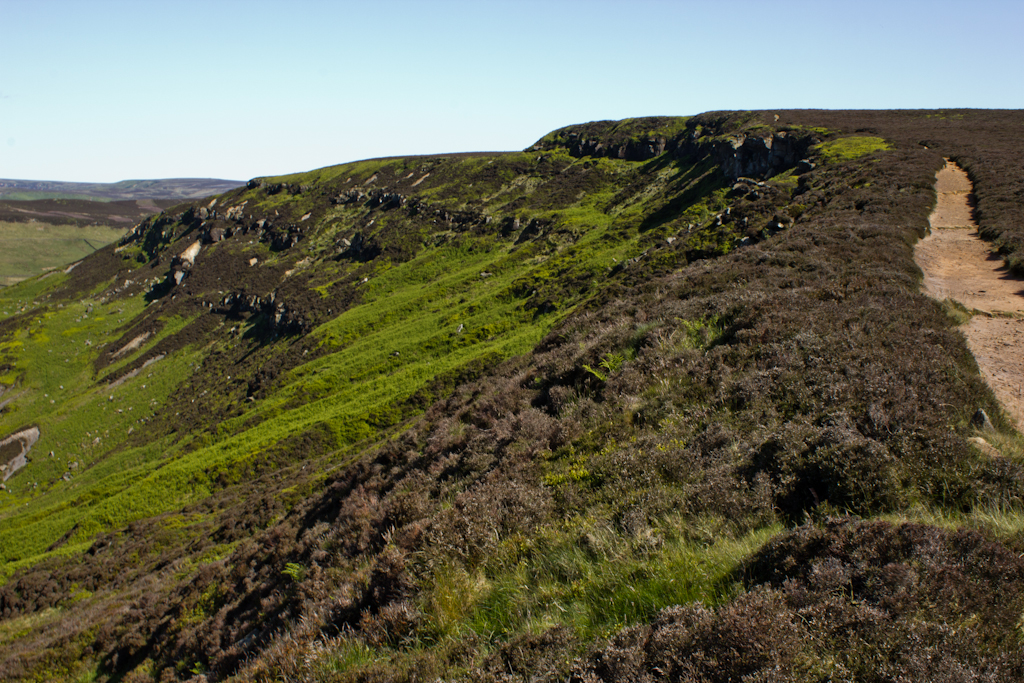
Cringle Moor's northern face

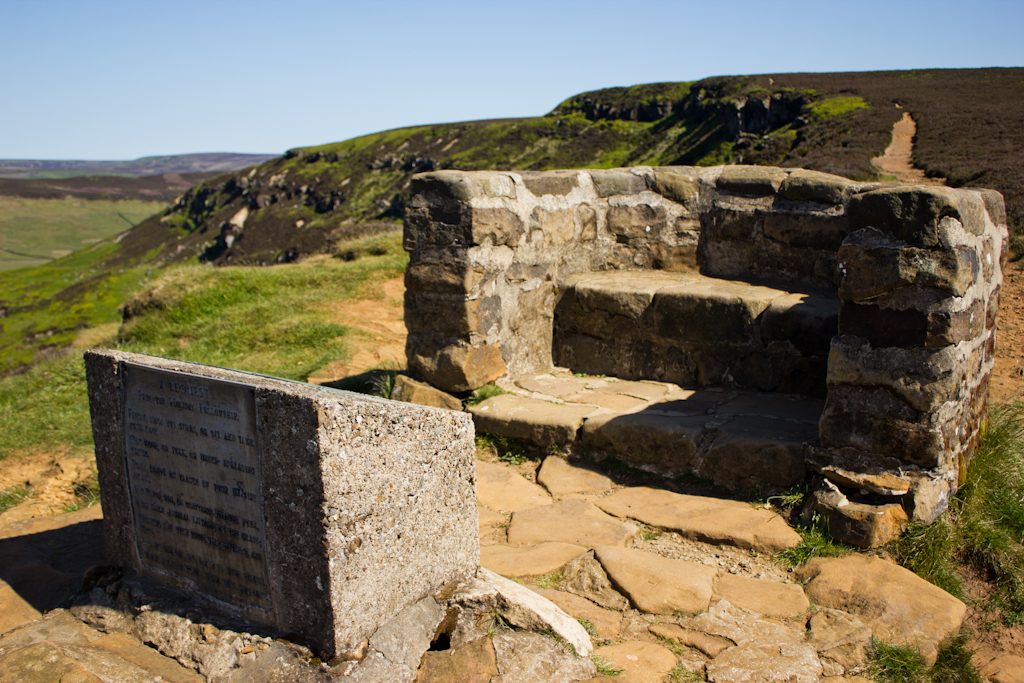
Stone seat on Cringle Moor

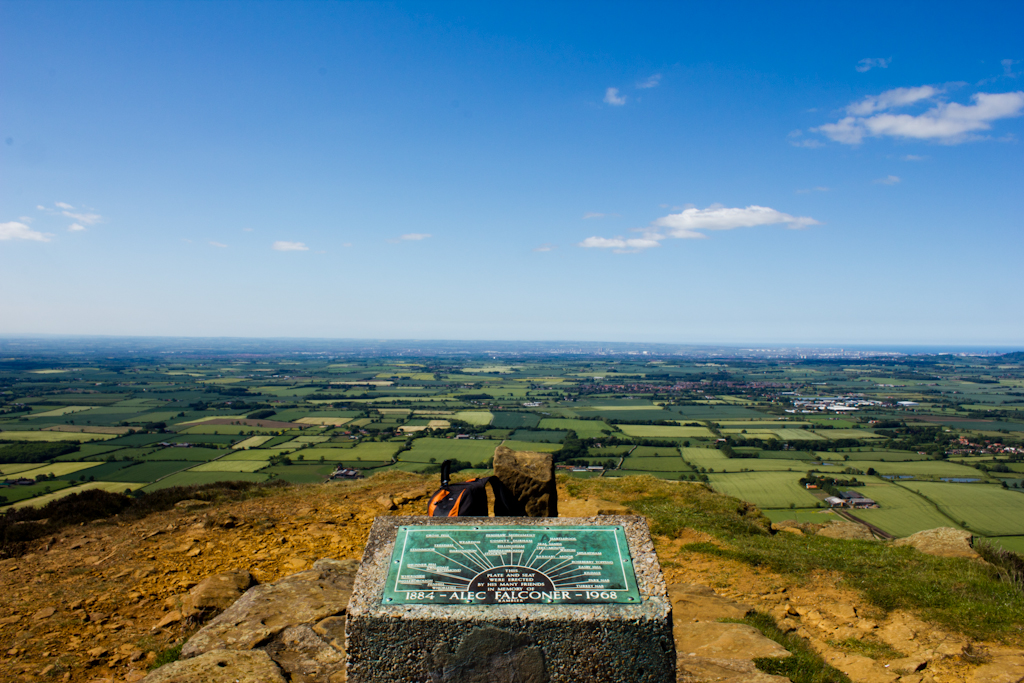
View north from Cringle Moor
