= North Yorkshire Fire & Rescue Service =

Statutory fire and rescue service

Operational area
- Country: England
- County: North Yorkshire

Agency overview
- Annual calls: 15,000 (2016)
- Employees: 635 (2025)
- Chief Fire Officer: Jon Dyson

Facilities and equipment
- Divisions: 8
- Stations: 38
- Engines: 43
- Platforms: 3
- Rescues: 3
- HAZMAT: 1
- Rescue boats: 3

Website
- www.northyorksfire.gov.uk

North Yorkshire Fire & Rescue Service is the statutory fire and rescue service covering the area of the unitary authorities of North Yorkshire and the City of York. The service covers an area of 3,209 square miles (8,310 km^{2}) and serves a population of 830,000. It is divided into eight groups related to the above districts.

== Performance ==
Every fire and rescue service in England and Wales is periodically subjected to a statutory inspection by His Majesty's Inspectorate of Constabulary and Fire & Rescue Services (HMICFRS). The inspections investigate how well the service performs in each of three areas. On a scale of outstanding, good, requires improvement and inadequate, North Yorkshire Fire & Rescue Service was rated as follows:

HMICFRS Inspection North Yorkshire
Area	Rating 2018/19	Rating 2021/22	Description
Effectiveness	Good	Requires improvement	How effective is the fire and rescue service at keeping people safe and secure from fire and other risks?
Efficiency	Requires improvement	Inadequate	How efficient is the fire and rescue service at keeping people safe and secure from fire and other risks?
People	Requires improvement	Inadequate	How well does the fire and rescue service look after its people?

== History ==
Like all areas of the country, independent fire brigades developed in towns and cities across England which catered for the immediate area and were sponsored by the local authority. Examples within North Yorkshire were the Scarborough Fire Brigade, the Whitby Town Fire Brigade, and Pocklington Town Fire Brigade, which were merged in 1948 into the North Riding Fire Brigade. York had a separate professional fire brigade instituted in 1940 (under a Fire act of 1938), which was subsumed into the North Yorkshire Fire & Rescue Service in 1996 when the City of York Council and the North Yorkshire Fire Authority combined their efforts into one fire authority. In 1947, the North Riding Fire Brigade had three divisions; Eston (A), Northallerton (B) and Scarborough (C).

Fire stations and services have fluctuated with changing council and local authority areas and with cutbacks to the fire service itself. The North Riding Fire Brigade lost some of its most northern areas around Guisborough and Saltburn to the newly formed Teesside Fire service in 1968. Teesside later became Cleveland Fire Brigade. The county boundary changes of 1974 had a profound effect on North Yorkshire, as the area it covered increased from 2,116 square miles (5,480 km^{2}) to 3,207 square miles (8,310 km^{2}) and saw an increase in stations from 30 to 34. In the 1970s, the brigade closed Whixley fire station near Boroughbridge, and in 2013, Snainton fire station near Scarborough was closed too. Cover would be supplied from nearby Whitby and Scarborough fire stations.

In 2016, in line with other fire and police force mergers, a proposal was put forward that North Yorkshire Fire and Rescue merge with the Humberside Fire & Rescue Service. However, the proposal was not backed by the leaders of county councils and emergency commissioners from the Humberside operating area, and so the merger proposal was shelved.

In 2018, the North Yorkshire Police and Crime Commissioner, Julia Mulligan, also took on the role of fire commissioner for North Yorkshire. In October 2021, the incumbent commissioner Philip Allott resigned following comments surrounding the murder of Sarah Everard.

== Stations ==
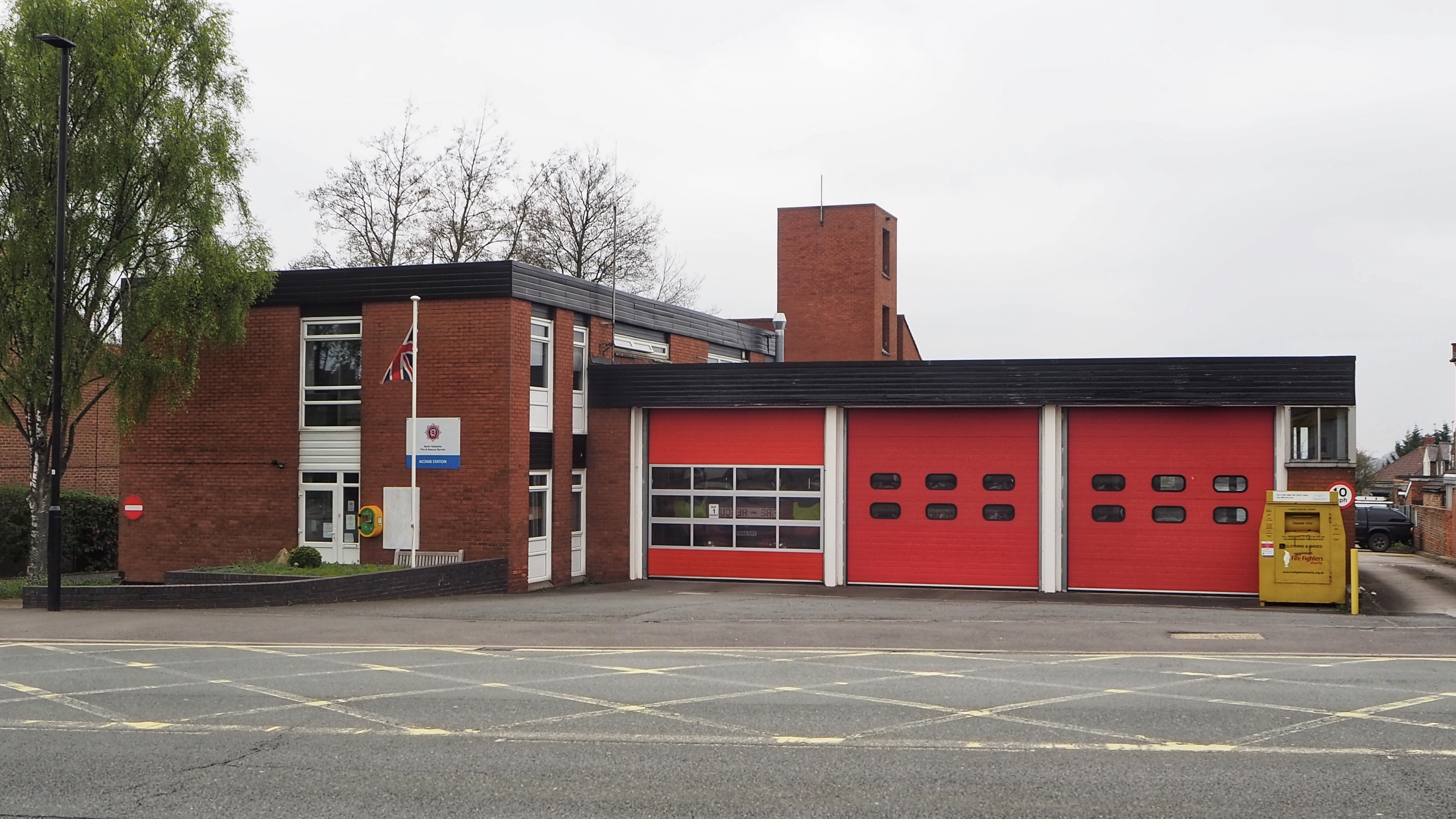
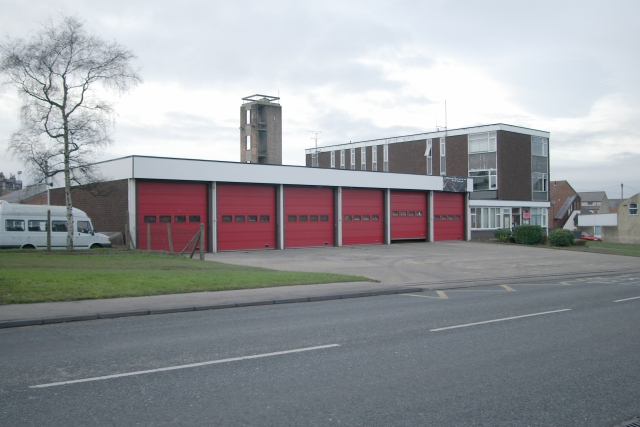
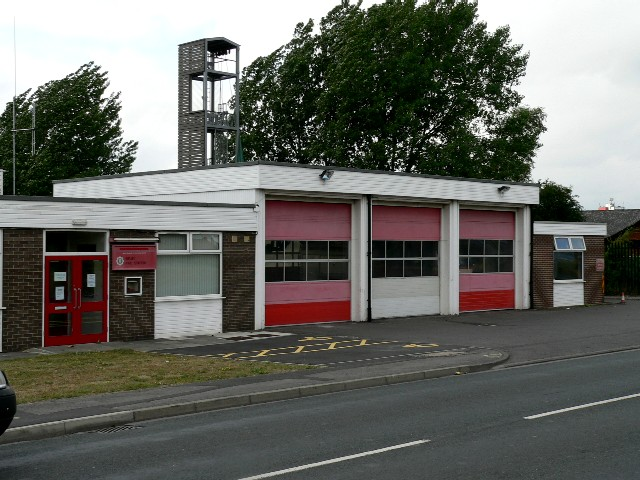
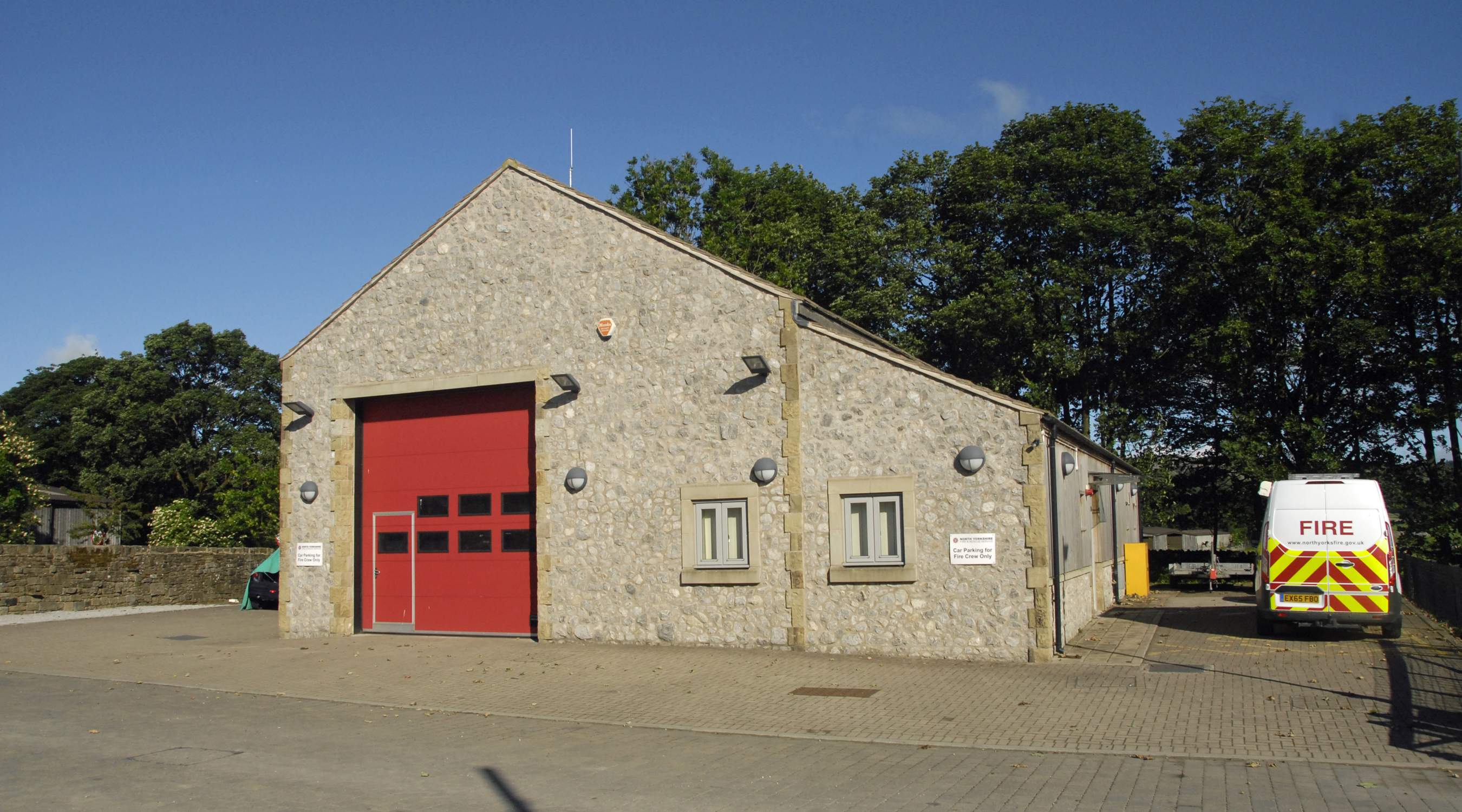
Clockwise from top left: Some of the service's fire stations in Acomb, Harrogate, Grassington and Selby

The service has a total of 38 fire stations. The majority of these are crewed by retained firefighters, with the minority being wholetime or day-crewed. North Yorkshire also has two fire stations which are crewed by volunteers. The breakdown of station crewing is:

- Five wholetime shift fire stations
- Seven wholetime day-crewed stations
- 24 retained stations
- Two volunteer-crewed stations

In addition to the fire stations, there are a headquarters and control room in Northallerton and a training centre in Easingwold. The fire service also shares the transport and logistics hub in Thirsk with North Yorkshire Police. In total, 70% of NYF&RS stations are crewed by on-call or volunteer firefighters. North Yorkshire claim to have the smallest fire station in the world; the station at Goathland measures 4 metres (13 ft) by 6 metres (20 ft). In 2025, the service had 313 full-time firefighters, and 322 on-call firefighters.

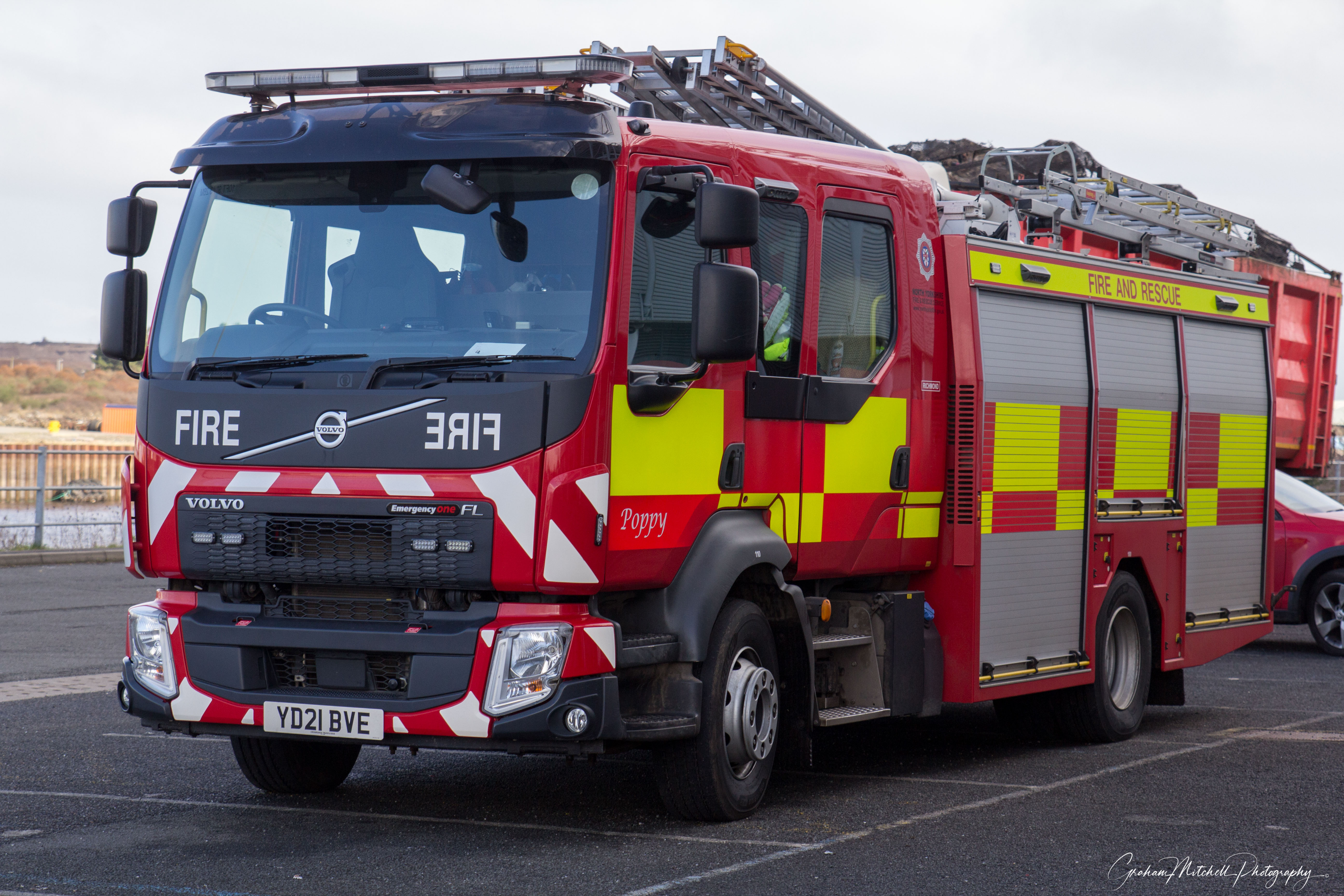
North Yorkshire Fire & Rescue appliance

== Incidents and statistics ==
The FRS received a total number of 19,000 emergency calls in 2007, as well as this the service also dealt with 9,000 incidents that year. Additionally, the service experienced a drop in call-outs by 32% between 2003 and 2013. The total number of incidents attended in the 2014-15 year was 6,874, of which 3,777 were false alarms.

By 2016, this had dropped to 15,000 and received notoriety when a crew in Harrogate was delayed in getting to a car fire after it emerged they had been sent to the wrong location by a control room in Cornwall. NYFRS shares its control room operations with the Cornwall Fire & Rescue Service during peak periods. A later investigation determined that the mix-up was down to the caller not supplying timely information rather than the Cornish operator not having 'local' knowledge.

=== Notable incidents ===
- 9 July 1984 – York Minster fire - 150 firefighters from across North Yorkshire fought the blaze which caused over £1 million worth of damage and was believed to have been caused by lightning
- 24 May 1995 – Dunkeswick air crash
- 28 December 1996 – an explosion at a gas bottling plant in Aiskew near Bedale, resulted in flames shooting 100 feet (30 m) in the air and the evacuation of 200 people. A gas engineer and the fire service turned off the valves and managed to extinguish the fire. At its height, the response from the NYF&RS was 80 firefighters and 18 appliances
- 10 August 2021 – a fire at Bilsdale transmitting station involved eight pumps from across North Yorkshire
- 11 August 2025 – the Langdale Moor wildfire which burned through much of August

== See also ==
- Fire Service in the United Kingdom
- Fire apparatus
- Fire Engine
- FiReControl
- List of British firefighters killed in the line of duty
