= May Moss (bog) =

Bog in North Yorkshire, England

- Site of Special Scientific Interest
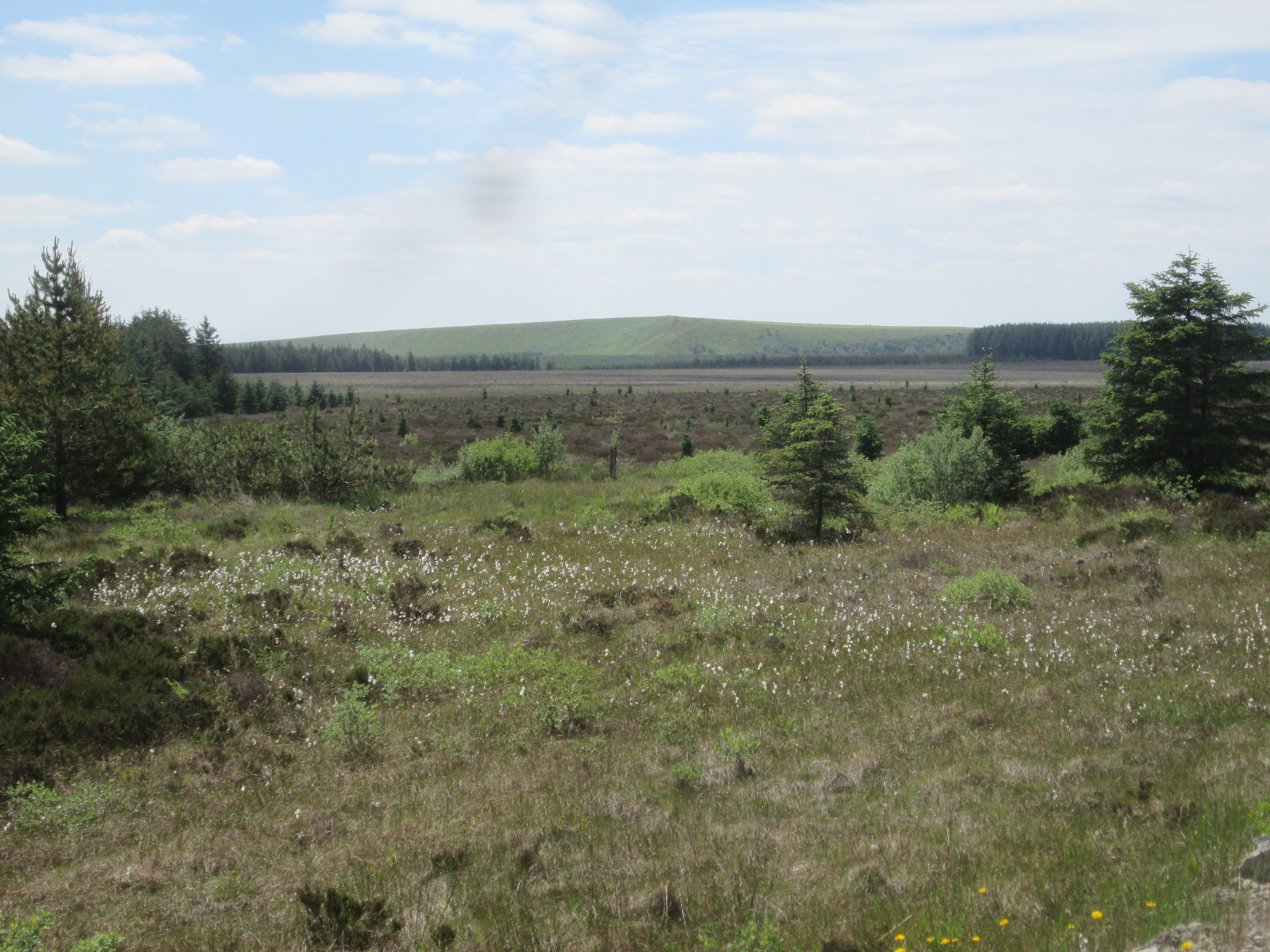
- Looking westwards across May Moss

- Location within North Yorkshire
- Location of May Moss.
- Area of search: North Yorkshire
- Grid reference: SE876960
- Coordinates: 54.352°N 0.654°W
- Area: 170 ha (420 acres)
- Notification date: 3 June 1983 (superseded in 1998)

May Moss is a peat bog in the North York Moors National Park, in North Yorkshire, England. The bog is 3.2 kilometres (2 mi) east of the old Saltersgate Inn at a height of 253 metres (830 ft) above sea level, and is the watershed where water feeds Eller Beck to the north, and the River Derwent to the south. The site was a declared an SSSI in June 1983, but was subsumed into the larger North York Moors SSSI in 1998.

== Site description ==
May Moss is an ombrotrophic mire (a location where the only water source is rainfall) which is at 244 metres (801 ft) above sea level, some 3.2 kilometres (2 mi) east of Saltersgate Inn, and is part of Fylingdales Moor. It has peat that reaches to at least 6 metres (20 ft) in depth, and has an accumulation of peat lasting 9,000 years, with 2 metres (6 ft 7 in) of peat being laid down over the 2,000 years up to the year 1998. The bog overlays a bedrock of Middle Jurassic sandstone of the Osgodby Formation and acts as a watershed which feeds streams northwards via Eller beck first into the Murk Esk, then the River Esk, westwards towards Pickering Beck, and southwards into the River Derwent via a stream known as Long Grain. The name is first recorded in 1335 as mawemose, the first part being perhaps an Old Norse name, and the second part from mos meaning a peat bog. It is possible that May Moss was mentioned in a document by Alan de Percy in the 12th century when he granted lands to the monks of Whitby Abbey covering a huge swathe of what is now the North York Moors. During the nineteenth century, peat was worked at the site commercially for use as a fuel. In the days before tarmacked roads when the moors were covered by old tracks and pannierways, May Moss was noted as a dangerous bog, and was also the haunt of robbers, so it was to be avoided.

May Moss has been preserved partially by a biologist persuading the Forestry Commission not to plant trees there, but also by the installation of RAF Fylingdales in the 1960s (which lies just to the north). By fencing off the surrounding moorland, the MoD accidentally helped to keep the area untouched. In conjunction with the base at RAF Fylingdales, a small weather recording station was installed at May Moss in August 2010 to note the water table depths and the temperature; precipitation data will be collated from the meteorological station at RAF Fylingdales. In 2009, efforts were undertaken to increase the size of the bog by felling trees on its edges. The trees had been planted between 1975 and 1983 in an attempt to create a lodgepole pine plantation; however the root system of the trees was slowly drying the bog out. It was hoped that the bog will then enlarge to an area of 140 hectares (350 acres) and absorb excess rainwater to prevent flooding downstream of the site. In 2020, the site was listed as covering 170 hectares (420 acres), whilst the North York Moors National Park has 5,500 hectares (14,000 acres) of deep peat (deep peat is determined to be peat which has a depth greater than 40 centimetres (16 in)).

The site is the only one of its kind on the North York Moors which is still actively accumulating peat. Samples of the peat have been taken to determine rates of climate change over several millennia. Studies and research on the peat have indicated a dip in temperatures between the 16th and 19th centuries, which is referred to in scientific circles as the Little Ice Age.

May Moss was designated as an SSSI in 1983, but in 1998, it was subsumed into the larger North York Moors SSSI.

== Flora and fauna ==
In the 1960s May Moss was recognised as the southern extent of the reach of carex pauciflora in Great Britain. Other plants recorded there include drosera rotundifolia (round-leafed sundew), calluna vulgaris (common heather), erica tetralix (cross-leaved heath), eriophorum (cotton grass), vaccinium oxycoccos (small cranberry), vaccinium myrtillus (bilberry) rubus chamaemorus (cloudberry), and andromeda polifolia (bog rosemary). The cloudberry and bog rosemary only occur on May Moss within the North York Moors. Pools and hollows on the site are usually are host to sphagnums (sphagnum cuspidatum, sphagnum recurvum, sphagnum papillosum, and sphagnum magellanicum).

It is known that the marsh harrier used to breed on May Moss, constructing nests of heather, grass and rushes. The butterfly species coenonympha tullia was first observed on the site in the 1950s, and adders are known to be present on the bog.
