= Blue Man-i'-th'-Moss =

Standing stone in North Yorkshire, England

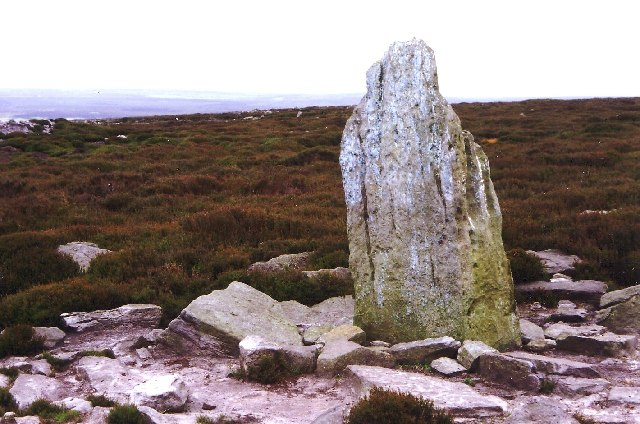
- Blue Man i' th' Moss
- Location: Wheeldale Moor on the course of the Lyke Wake Walk
- Coordinates: 54.3825°N 0.823611°W
- Type: Parish boundary stone

Blue Man-i'-th'-Moss is a standing stone in the North York Moors in northern England. It lies on Wheeldale Moor on the route of the Lyke Wake Walk.

It is a parish boundary stone, but is believed to have been standing since pre-Roman times. It is 2 metres (6.6 ft) tall and has small boulders and stones set in the ground around its base. The stone is considerably weathered.

Traces of blue paint which once covered the stone can be seen in places. There is a letter 'E' with a date 1841 engraved on the south face. A memorial plaque was cemented at the base of the stone on the south side in 2003 but was subsequently removed in 2016.
