= Hasty Bank =

Hill in North Yorkshire, England

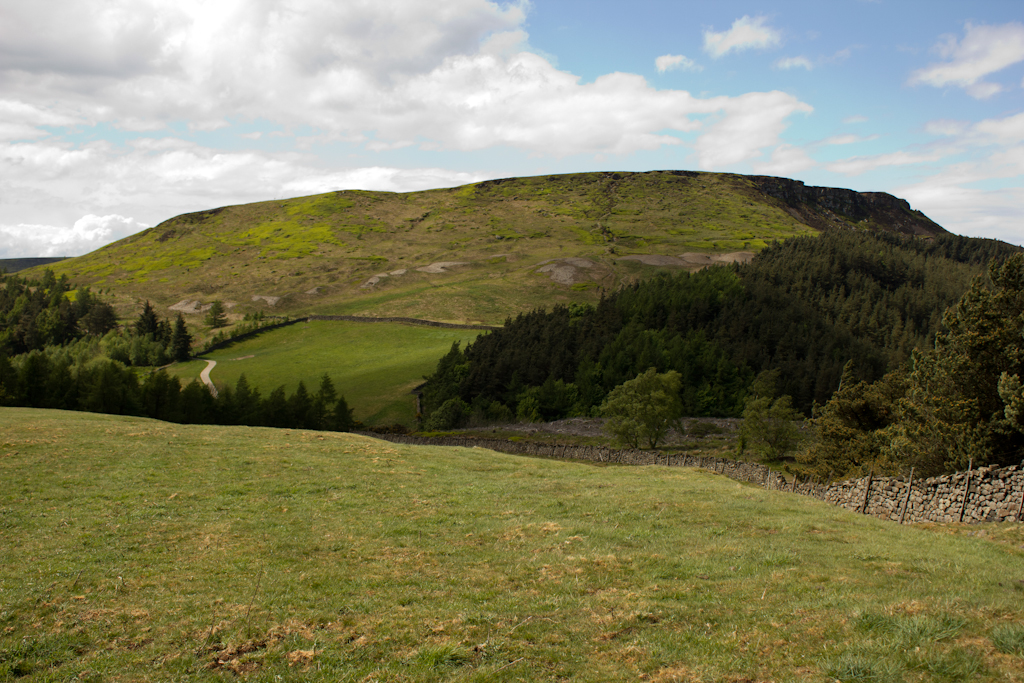
- Hasty Bank as seen from Urra Moor

Highest point
- Elevation: 398 m (1,306 ft)
- Listing: (none)
- Coordinates: 54°25′30.75″N 1°7′54.5″W

Geography
- Location: North York Moors, England
- Parent range: Cleveland Hills
- OS grid: NZ560035
- Topo map: OS Explorer OL26

Hasty Bank is a hill in the Cleveland Hills range of the North York Moors, in north-east England. The Cleveland Way National Trail crosses Hasty Bank and is part of Wainwright's Coast to Coast Walk. The north face of Hasty Bank has heavily eroded, possessing a vertical rocky face sloping steeply down to Broughton Bank. Roseberry Topping can be clearly seen from the summit which offers great views of the Tees Valley.

From the north, Hasty Bank is easily identified in line with Carlton Bank, Cringle Moor, Cold Moor, and Urra Moor which form the more northern facing hills of the range, before sweeping north to become the west facing hills up towards Roseberry Topping.

== The Wainstones ==
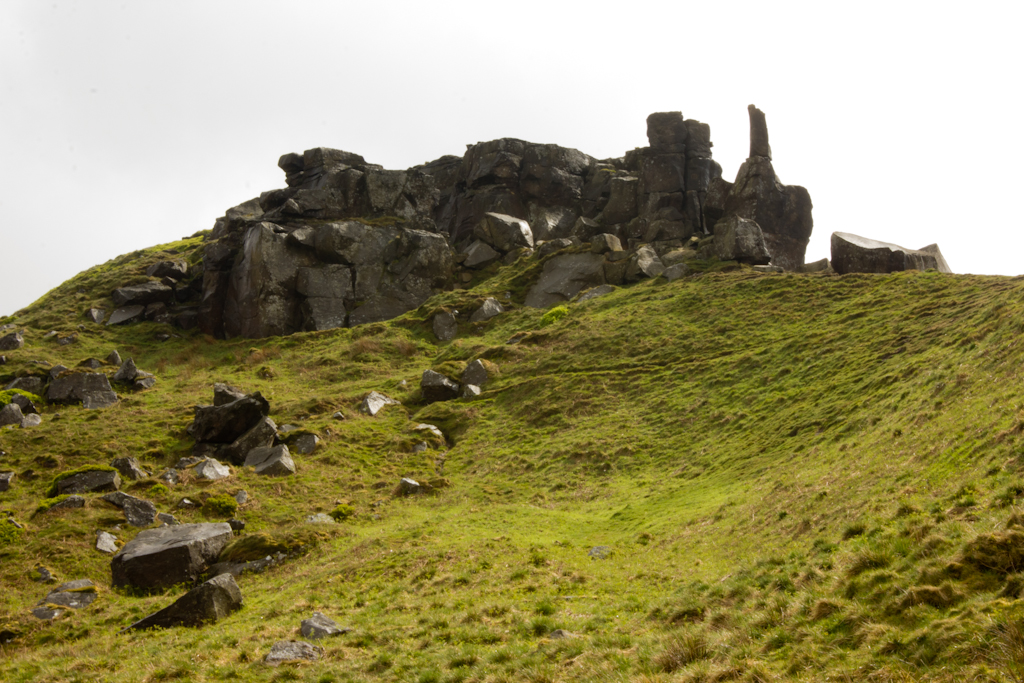
The Wainstones on Hasty Bank

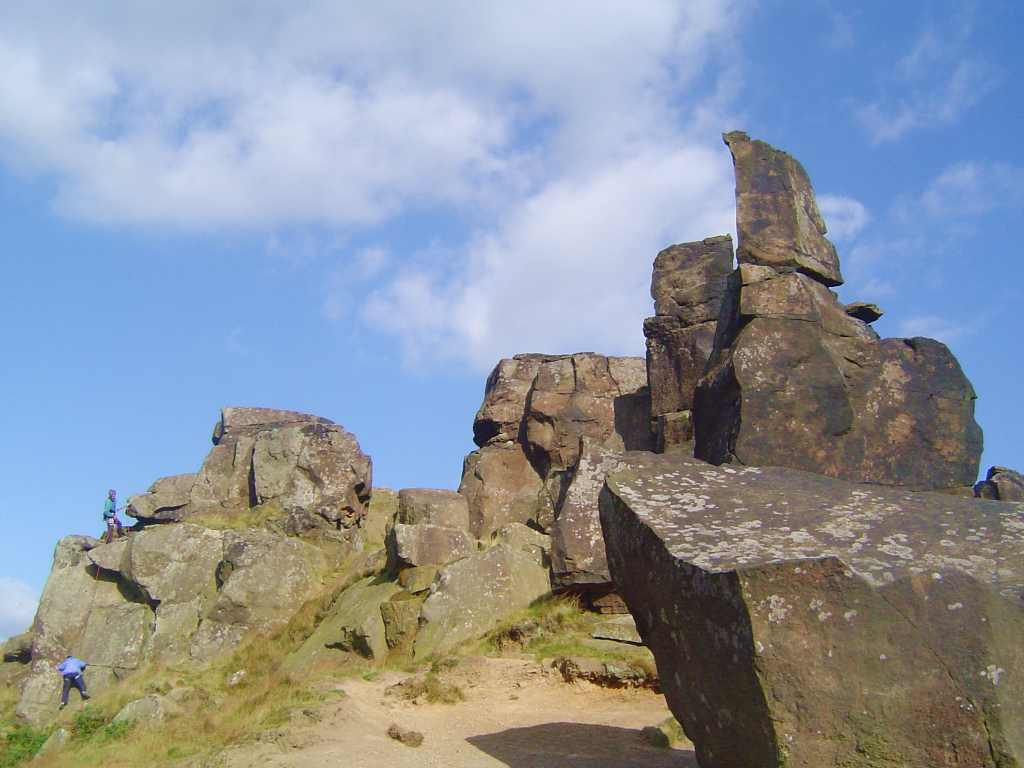
The Wainstones near Great Broughton

A large rocky outcrop known as the Wainstones lies at the western end of Hasty Bank, just below the summit. Exhibiting carvings including cup and ring markings, dating back to the Bronze Age, these rocks may once have held significant importance to prehistoric locals.

== Gallery ==
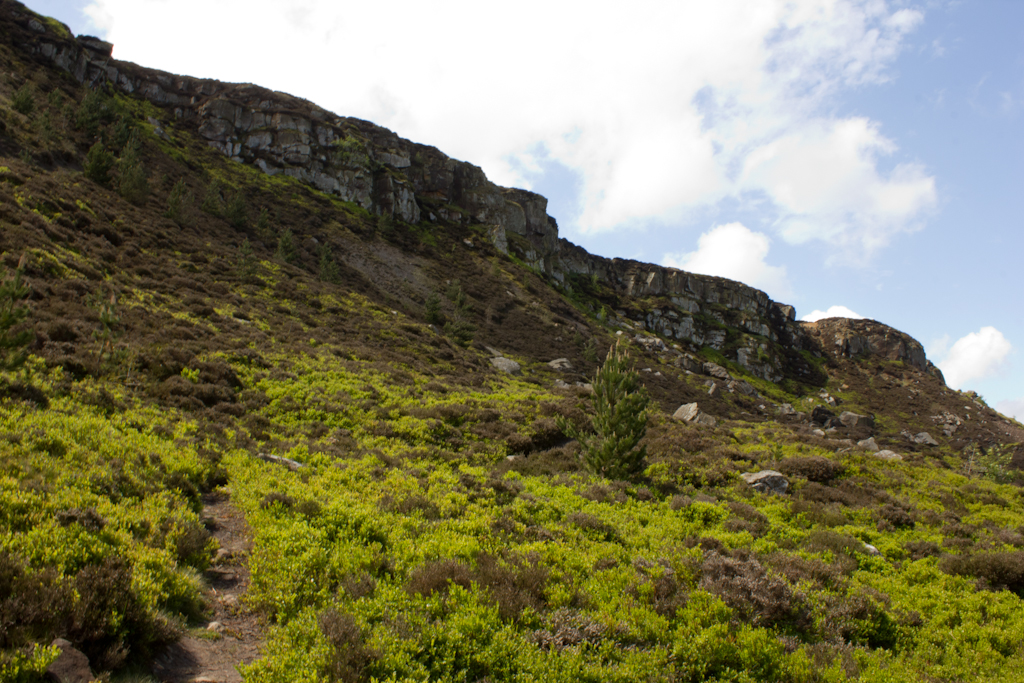
Hasty Bank's eroded north face

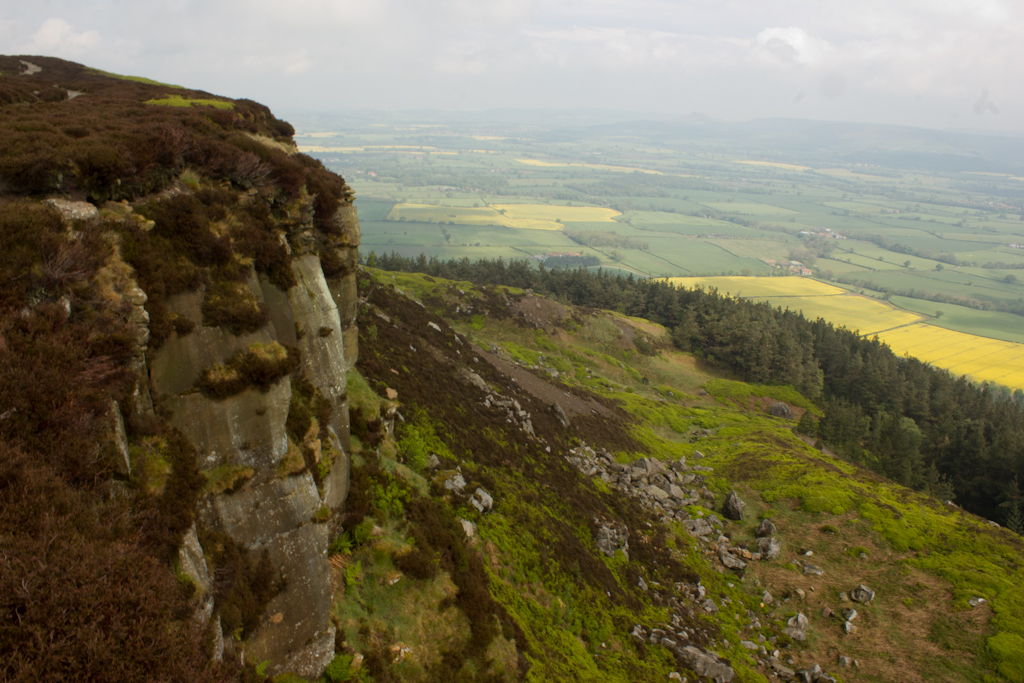
View of the Tees Valley from Hasty Bank

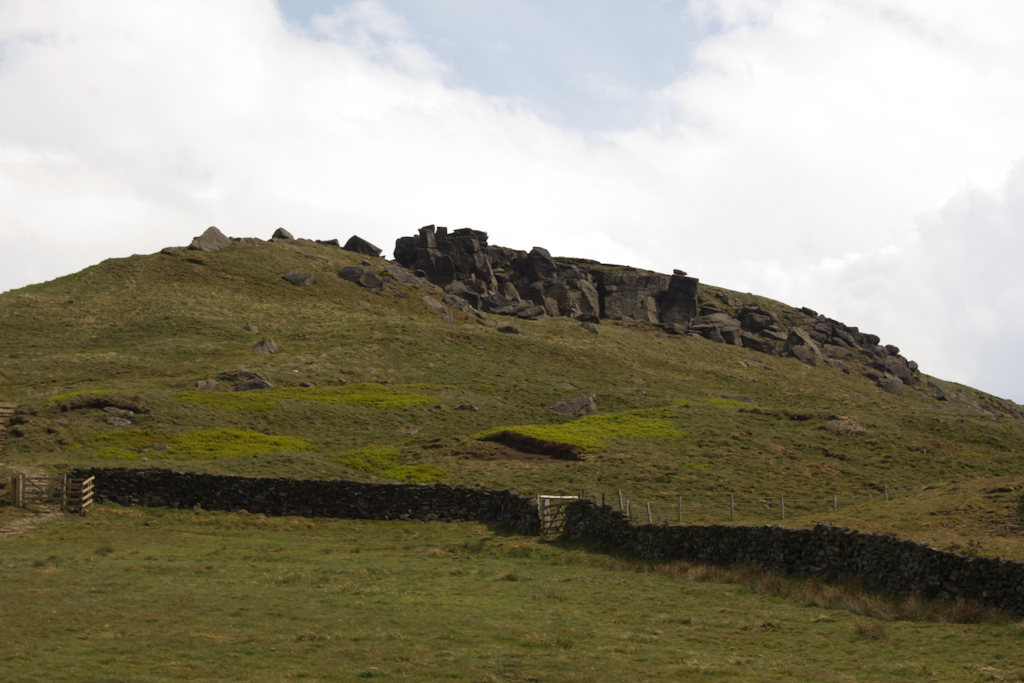
The Wainstones on Hasty Bank's south-west edge

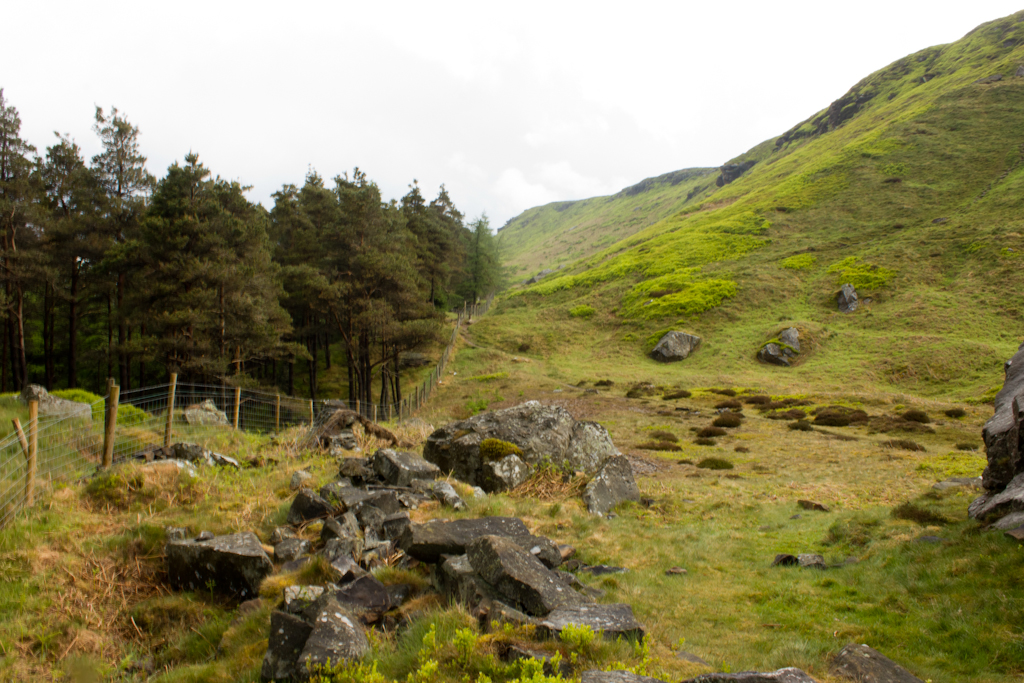
Hasty Bank sloping down to Broughton Bank
