= Ruther Cross =

Stone cross in North Yorkshire, England

Coordinates: 54.52633°N 1.06758°W

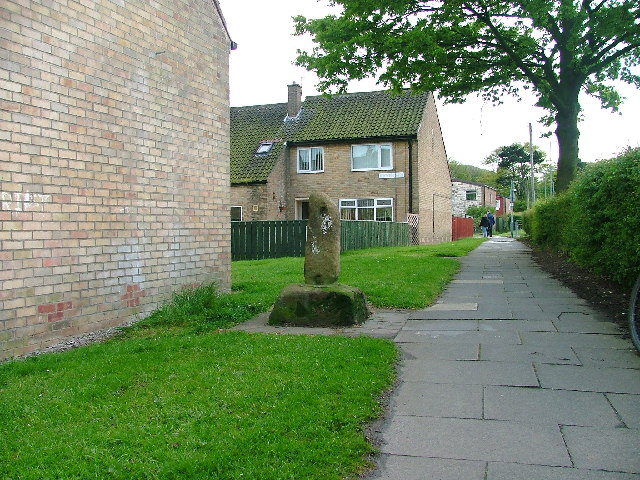
Ruther Cross

Ruther Cross is the shaft of an old stone cross in Guisborough in Redcar and Cleveland, England. It stands close to the point where the old road Ruthergate used to cross Hutton Lane. The cross was designated Grade II listed in April 1984.
