= Ruthergate =

Disused road in North Yorkshire, England

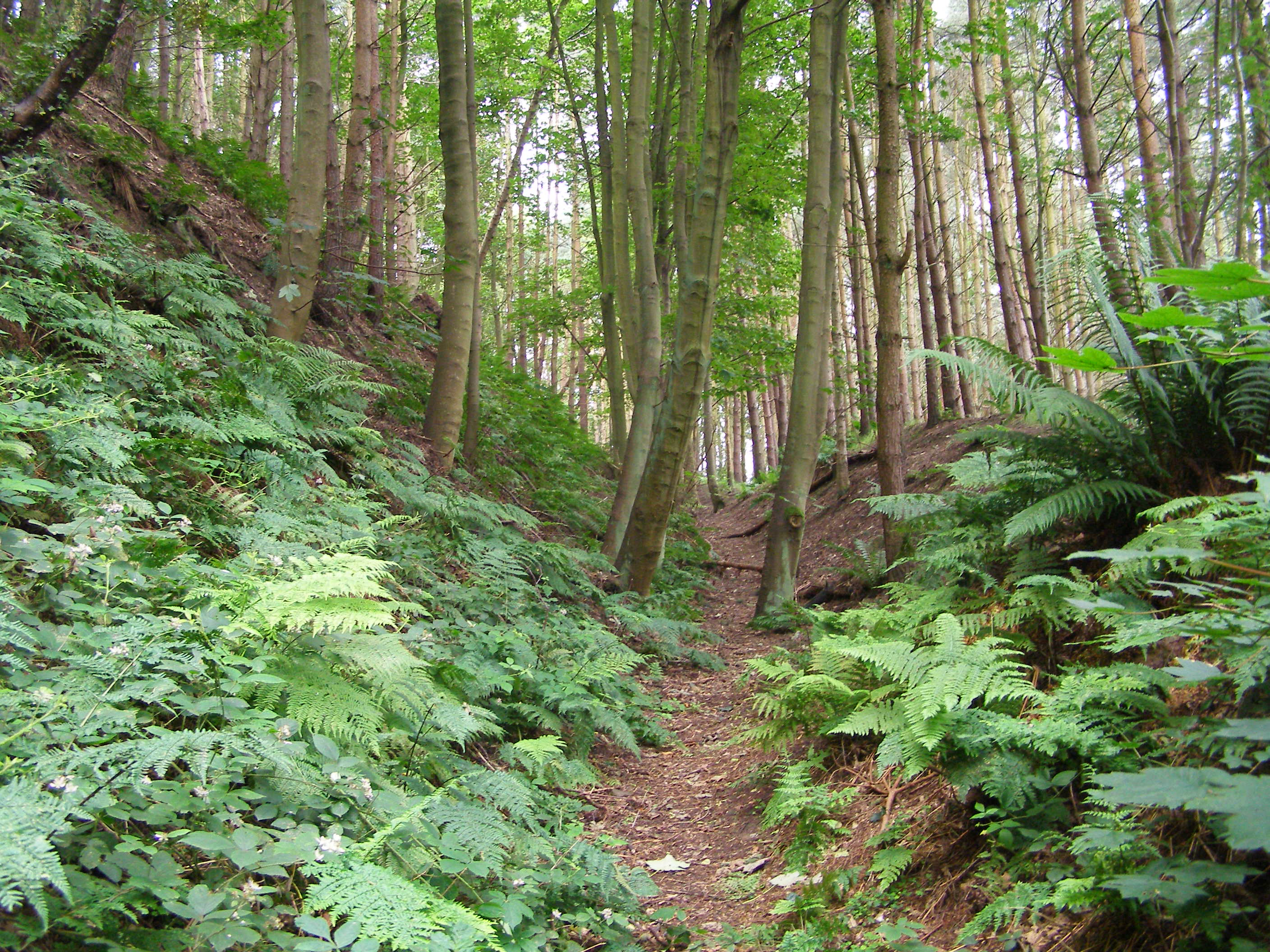
Ruthergate on Kemplah Hill

Ruthergate is an old road near Guisborough in Redcar and Cleveland, England, now disused. It leads southwards from Ruther Cross on Hutton Lane before winding up Kemplah Hill in a well-marked cutting. It is mentioned in early charters, sometimes as Rechergate, sometimes as Rogergate. It may have originally been created as an access road to a quarry on Highcliff.
