= Humphrey Taylor =

Bishop of Selby (1938–2021)

The Right Reverend Humphrey Taylor
- Bishop of Selby
- Church: Church of England
- Diocese: Diocese of York
- In office: 1991–2003
- Predecessor: Clifford Barker
- Successor: Martin Wallace
- Other posts: Honorary assistant bishop in Gloucester (2003–2013) and in Worcester (2003–2016)

Orders
- Ordination: 1963 (deacon); 1964 (priest)
- Consecration: 1991

Personal details
- Born: 5 March 1938
- Died: February 2021 (aged 82)
- Denomination: Anglican
- Parents: Maurice Taylor & Mary Taylor (née Wood)
- Spouse: Anne Dart (m. 1965)
- Children: 2 daughters
- Education: Pembroke College, Cambridge

Humphrey Vincent Taylor (5 March 1938 – 17 February 2021) was an English Anglican clergyman who served as the sixth Suffragan Bishop of Selby.

== Biography ==
He was educated at Twyford, Harrow and Pembroke College, Cambridge. After training for ordination at the College of the Resurrection, Mirfield, he was ordained deacon in 1963 and priest in 1964. He began his career with a curacy in Hammersmith and was then successively Rector of Lilongwe, Malaŵi, a chaplain at Bishop Grosseteste College in Lincoln, a Church administrator (firstly for the Synod; latterly for the USPG) before appointment to the Episcopate as Bishop suffragan of Selby — a post he held from 1991 until 2003. In retirement he continued to minister as an honorary assistant bishop in the Dioceses of Gloucester (2003–2013) and of Worcester, in which he had settled at Honeybourne, Worcestershire (2003–2016).

Taylor died in February 2021 at the age of 82, less than one month short of his 83rd birthday.

Church of England titles
Preceded by Clifford Barker	Bishop of Selby; 1991–2003	Succeeded by Martin Wallace
