= Douglas Sargent =

Douglas Noel Sargent
- Bishop of Selby
- Douglas Sargent in 1962
- Church: Church of England
- Diocese: York
- Installed: 1962
- Term ended: 1971
- Predecessor: Carey Knyvett
- Successor: Morris Maddocks

Personal details
- Born: 1907 Near London, England
- Died: 1979 (aged 71–72) York, North Yorkshire, England
- Denomination: Anglican
- Spouse: Imogene Ward
- Education: Watford Grammar School for Boys; King's College, Cambridge; London College of Divinity; Union Theological Seminary, New York

Douglas Noel Sargent (1907–1979) was the third Bishop of Selby.

== Biography ==
Sargent was born near London, and educated at Watford Grammar School for Boys, King's College, Cambridge and the London College of Divinity; and ordained in 1932. His first post was as Curate at Willian, Hertfordshire. Subsequently, he embarked on a long spell as a missionary in Sichuan Province at West China Union University, where he worked as a lecturer. During his stay in Sichuan, he became chaplain to Bishop C. T. Song and assistant secretary for the Church Missionary Society. In 1942 he married Imogene Ward, the daughter of American Methodist missionaries. From 1947 to 1948 he studied at Union Theological Seminary, New York. From 1961 until 1962 he was principal of the Church Missionary Society when he was elevated to the episcopate, a post he held until his retirement to York. He was ordained into bishop's orders on St James's Day 1962 (25 July), by Donald Coggan, Archbishop of York, at York Minster.

== See also ==
- Anglicanism in Sichuan

== Notes ==
Church of England titles
Preceded by Carey Frederick Knyvett	Bishop of Selby; 1962–1971	Succeeded by Morris Henry St John Maddocks
