= Clifford Barker (bishop) =

The Right Reverend Clifford Barker
- Bishop of Selby
- Church: Church of England
- Diocese: Diocese of York
- In office: 1983–1991
- Predecessor: Morris Maddocks
- Successor: Humphrey Taylor
- Other posts: Bishop of Whitby (1976–1983); Honorary assistant bishop in York (1991–2017 (his death))

Orders
- Ordination: 1952 (deacon); 1953 (priest)
- Consecration: 1976

Personal details
- Born: 22 April 1926
- Died: 31 May 2017 (aged 91)
- Denomination: Anglican
- Parents: Sidney & Kathleen
- Spouse: Marie Edwards (m. 1952; d. 1982); Audrey Gregson (m. 1983)
- Children: 1 son; 2 daughters; 2 step-sons; 1 step-daughter
- Education: Oriel College, Oxford

Clifford Conder Barker (22 April 1926 – 31 May 2017) was an Anglican suffragan bishop in the last quarter of the 20th century.

Born in 1926 he was educated at Oriel College, Oxford (he gained an Oxford Master of Arts) and St Chad's College, Durham. After World War II service with the Green Howards he was ordained priest in 1953. Following a curacy in Scarborough he rose steadily in the Church hierarchy being successively Vicar of Sculcoates, Rural Dean of Stokesley and Prebendary of York before his ordination to the episcopate. After seven years as Bishop of Whitby he became the Bishop of Selby. In retirement he served as an assistant bishop in the Diocese of York.

He died on 31 May 2017 at the age of 91.

Church of England titles
Preceded by John Yates	Bishop of Whitby; 1976–1983	Succeeded by Gordon Bates
Preceded by Morris Maddocks	Bishop of Selby; 1983–1991	Succeeded by Humphrey Taylor
