= John Thomson (bishop) =

British Anglican bishop

The Right Reverend John Thomson
- Bishop of Selby
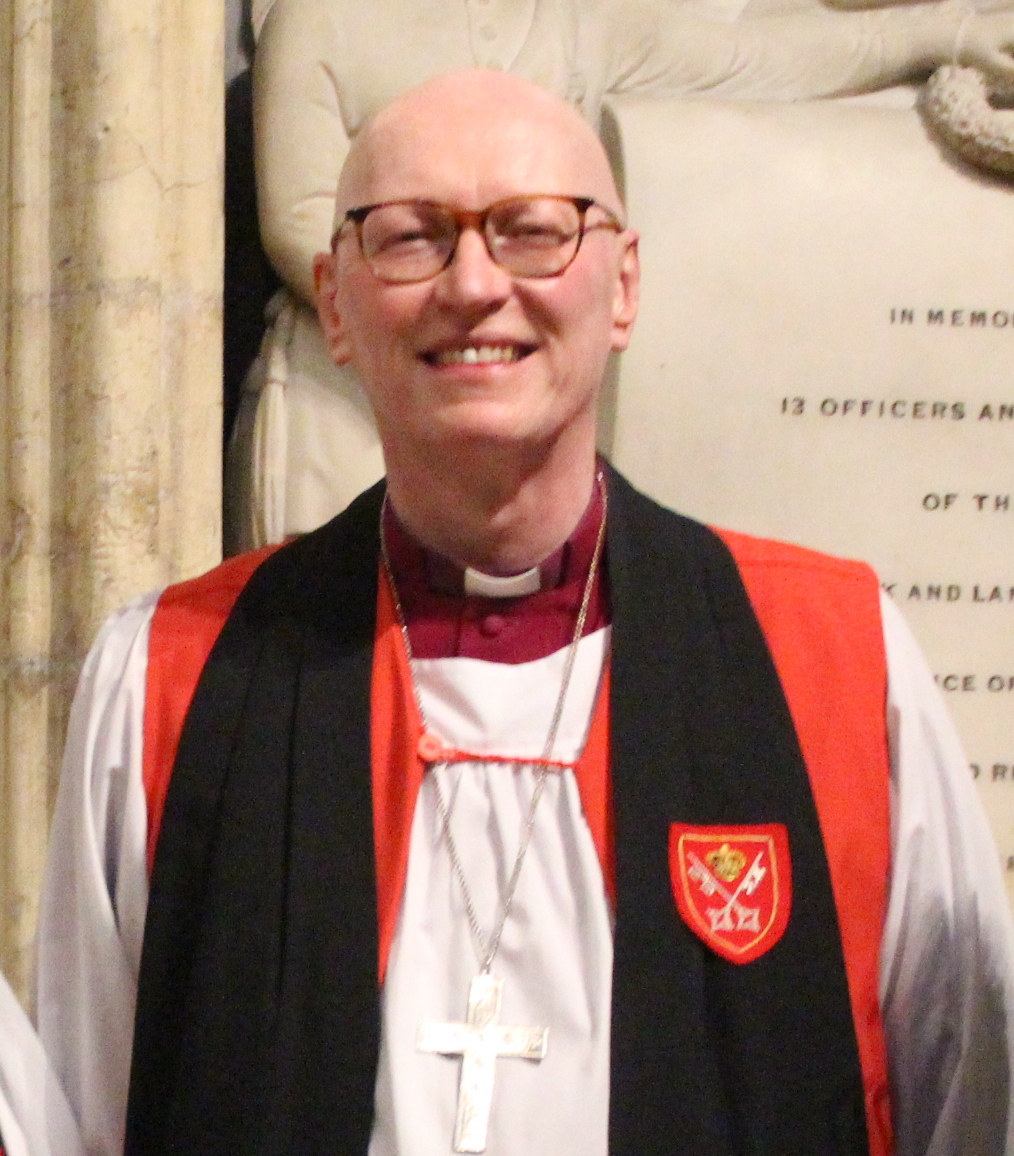
- Thomson in 2024
- Church: Church of England
- Diocese: Diocese of York
- In office: 2014 to 2024
- Predecessor: Martin Wallace
- Successor: Flora Winfield

Orders
- Ordination: 1985 (deacon); 1986 (priest) by David Lunn
- Consecration: 3 July 2014 by John Sentamu

Personal details
- Born: 1 July 1959 (age 67) Edinburgh, Scotland
- Denomination: Anglicanism
- Education: University of York; Wycliffe Hall, Oxford; University of Oxford; University of Nottingham

John Bromilow Thomson (born 1 July 1959) is a British retired Anglican bishop. From 2014 to 2024, he was the Bishop of Selby, a suffragan bishop in the Church of England's Diocese of York.

He began his ordained ministry as a curate and youth chaplain in the Diocese of Sheffield, before moving to South Africa and the Anglican Church of Southern Africa as a tutor at a theological college. He returned to Sheffield where he was a vicar from 1993 to 2001 and then the director of ministry for the Diocese of Sheffield from 2001 to 2014.

== Early life and education ==
Thomson was born on 1 July 1959 in Edinburgh, Scotland. He also spent twelve years living in Uganda. He was educated at Edinburgh Academy, then an all-boys independent school in Edinburgh, and at Haberdashers' Aske's Boys' School, an independent school in Elstree, Hertfordshire, England. He studied history at the University of York, graduating with a Bachelor of Arts (BA) degree in 1981.

Thomson then trained for ordination at Wycliffe Hall, Oxford, an evangelical Anglican theological college. He also studied theology and graduated from the University of Oxford with a Bachelor of Arts (BA) degree in 1984: as per tradition, his BA was promoted to a Master of Arts (MA Oxon) degree in 1991. He later continued his studies part-time, and graduated from the University of Nottingham with a Doctor of Philosophy (PhD) degree in theology in 2001. His doctoral thesis was titled "The ecclesiology of Stanley Hauerwas as a distinctively Christian theology of liberation (1970-2000)".

== Ordained ministry ==
Thomson was made a deacon at Michaelmas 1985 (29 September) and ordained a priest the Petertide following (29 June 1986), both times by David Lunn, Bishop of Sheffield, at Sheffield Cathedral. From 1985 to 1989, he served his curacy at All Saints Church, Ecclesall in the Diocese of Sheffield. He was also the church's youth chaplain.

In 1989, Thomson moved to South Africa. He was a tutor at St Paul's College, Grahamstown, a theological college of the Anglican Church of Southern Africa, between 1989 and 1992. He was additionally an assistant priest at St Bartholomew's Church, Grahamstown from 1990 to 1992 and an assistant lecturer at Rhodes University from 1991 to 1992.

In 1993, he returned to England and was appointed vicar of St Mary's Church, Wheatley, Doncaster in the Diocese of Sheffield. After eight years as vicar, he was appointed director of ministry for the Diocese of Sheffield in 2001. He was additionally an honorary canon of Sheffield Cathedral from 2001.

On 2 May 2014, it was announced that Thomson would be the next Bishop of Selby, a suffragan bishop of the Diocese of York. He was consecrated a bishop at York Minster on 3 July 2014 by John Sentamu, Archbishop of York. He retired in July 2024.

== Personal life ==
In 1986, Thomson married Susan. Together they have two daughters.
