= Carey Knyvett =

British Christian bishop

Carey Frederick Knyvett (1885–1967) was the 2nd Bishop of Selby.

Knyvett was educated at Rugby and Trinity College, Oxford. He was ordained in 1912. His first post was as Curate at Petworth. Subsequently, he was Chaplain to the Bishop of Sheffield and married the Bishop's only daughter, Molly, in 1918. He was interviewed for a commission as a Temporary Chaplain to the Forces in May 1916. He served in a Casualty Clearing Station from June to September and then was attached to 48 Infantry Brigade during the Battle of the Somme. In 1918 he wrote an account of his experiences there, and kept a diary of his involvement in the British retreat of March–April 1918. These documents recount his feelings of being gassed, wounded and standing close to men killed by shellfire, and of praise for his preaching. Knyvett was twice mentioned in despatches, transferred to the RAF in May 1918, was awarded the OBE and was demobilised in 1919. He was appointed Vicar of Benwell and Archdeacon of Northampton and he ascended to the episcopate in 1941, a post he held until retirement 21 years later. He died in 1967, and the Archbishop of York wrote of him:

"His erect, almost soldierly, figure and his smiling face were for many years part of what went to the make-up of our life in York."

== Notes ==
Church of England titles
Preceded by Henry St John Stirling Woollcombe	Bishop of Selby; 1941 – 1962	Succeeded by Douglas Noel Sargent
