= Bishop of Selby =

Clerical office in the Church of England

The Bishop of Selby is an episcopal title used by a suffragan bishop of the Church of England Diocese of York, in the Province of York, England. The title refers to the town of Selby in North Yorkshire; the See was erected under the Suffragans Nomination Act 1888 by Order in Council dated 20 December 1938. The Bishop of Selby has episcopal oversight of the Archdeaconry of York.

On 3 July 2014, John Thomson was consecrated Bishop suffragan of Selby at York Minster; he retired in 2024. In July 2024, Flora Winfield was announced as the next Bishop of Selby; she was consecrated in October 2024.

== List of bishops ==
Bishops of Selby
From	Until	Incumbent	Notes
1939	1940	Harry Woollcombe	(1869–1941). Formerly Bishop of Whitby
1941	1962	Carey Knyvett	(1885–1967)
1962	1971	Douglas Sargent	(1907–1979)
1972	1983	Morris Maddocks	(1928–2008)
1983	1991	Clifford Barker	(1926–2017). Formerly Bishop of Whitby
1991	2003	Humphrey Taylor	(1938–2021)
2003	2013	Martin Wallace	(b. 1948)
2014	2024	John Thomson	(b. 1959) retired in July 2024.
2024	present	Flora Winfield	(b. 1964), nominated in September 2024; consecrated on 10 October 2024 at York Minster.
