= Martin Wallace (bishop) =

British Anglican bishop

- Bishop of Selby
- Church: Church of England
- Diocese: Diocese of York
- In office: 2003–2013
- Predecessor: Humphrey Taylor
- Successor: John Thomson
- Other post: Archdeacon of Colchester (1997–2003)

Orders
- Ordination: 1972
- Consecration: 4 December 2003

Personal details
- Born: 16 November 1948 (age 77) West Ham, Essex, England
- Denomination: Anglican
- Residence: Bishop's House, Malton
- Spouse: Diana (wife)
- Children: 1 son & 1 daughter
- Education: King's College London

Martin William Wallace (born 16 November 1948) is a retired Church of England bishop. He was the Bishop of Selby from 2003 to 2013.

== Early life ==
He was trained for the priesthood at King's College London (Winchester scholarship, Bachelor of Divinity {BDHons}, Associate of King's College {AKC}), spending his final year at St Augustine's College, Canterbury.

== Religious life ==
He was ordained in 1972 he began his career with a curacy at St Alban Attercliffe in the Diocese of Sheffield and was then successively vicar of St Mark, Forest Gate, rural dean of Newham, priest in charge of St Thomas Bradwell-on-Sea and St Lawrence, St Lawrence, Newland, and chaplain to St Peter on the Wall, Bradwell-on-Sea, and industrial chaplain to Bradwell Power Station and Archdeacon of Colchester before appointment to the episcopate.

Wallace was consecrated on 4 December 2003 at York Minster. From 2003 to 2013, he served as the Bishop of Selby, a suffragan bishop in the Diocese of York. In November 2013, he retired; and as of 2015, he lives in Bridlington, Yorkshire.

His works include Healing Encounters in the City (1987), City Prayers (1994), Pocket Celtic Prayers (1996), and A Celtic Resource Book (1998). In addition to writing, he is also a keen garden designer.

== Styles ==
- The Reverend Martin Wallace (1972–1989)
- The Reverend Canon Martin Wallace (1989–1997)
- The Venerable Martin Wallace (1997–2003)
- The Right Reverend Martin Wallace (2003–present)

Church of England titles
Preceded by Humphrey Taylor	Bishop of Selby; 2003—2013	Succeeded by John Thomson
