= John Carey (Celticist) =

American professor and scholar of Celtic studies

John Carey is an American philologist, professor, and scholar of Celtic studies, specialising in subjects of early Irish and Welsh literature, religion, and mythology. A graduate of Harvard University, he was an associate professor at the Department of Celtic Languages and Literature. He has received fellowships at Warburg Institute (University of London), the Institute of Irish Studies at Queen's University, Belfast and the Dublin Institute for Advanced Studies. He later moved to the Department of Early and Medieval Irish at the University College Cork (UCC), where he now teaches. He is fellow at the Temenos Academy and editor of Temenos Academy Review.

== Selected works ==
- 1982. "The Location of the Otherworld in Irish Tradition." Éigse 19 (1982): 36–43.
- 1984. "Nodons in Britain and Ireland." ZCP 40 (1984): 1-22.
- 1987. "Time, Space, and the Otherworld." Proceedings of the Harvard Celtic Colloquium 7: 1-27.
- 1989-90. "Myth and Mythography in Cath Maige Tuired." Studia Celtica 24-5: 53–69.
- 1991. "A British Myth of Origins?" History of Religions 31: 24–38.
- 1994. The Irish National Origin-Legend: Synthetic Pseudohistory. Quiggin Pamphlets on the Sources of Mediaeval Gaelic History 1. Cambridge, University of Cambridge.
- 1994 (ed. with John T. Koch). The Celtic Heroic Age. Literary Sources for Ancient Celtic Europe and Early Ireland and Wales. Malden, Massachusetts: Celtic Studies Publications. Includes translations by John Carey.
- 1994. "An Edition of the Pseudo-Historical Prologue to the Senchas Már." Ériu 45: 1-32.
- 1996. "The Narrative Setting of Baile Chuinn Chétchathaig." Études Celtiques 32: 189–201.
- 1997. "The Three Things Required of a Poet." Ériu 48: 41–58.
- 1998 (1st ed.), 2000 (2nd ed.). King of Mysteries. Early Irish Religious Writings. Dublin: Four Courts Press.
- 1999. A Single Ray of the Sun. Religious Speculation in Early Ireland. Andover and Aberystwyth.
- 2002. "The Lough Foyle Colloquy Texts." Ériu 52 (2002): 53–87.
- 2002. "Werewolves in Medieval Ireland." Cambrian Medieval Celtic Studies 44 (Winter 2002): 37–72.
- 2004. "The Encounter at the Ford: Warriors, Water and Women." Éigse 34 (2004): 10–24.
- 2005. "Tara and the Supernatural." In The Kingship and Landscape of Tara, ed. Edel Bhreathnach. Dublin. 32–48.
- 2007. Ireland and the Grail. Aberystwyth: Celtic Studies Publications.
- 2007. "In Tenga Bithnua and the Days of Creation." Apocrypha 18: 231–46.
