= Anglicanism =

Major branch of Protestantism

Anglicanism, also known as Episcopalianism in some countries, is a Western Christian tradition which developed from the practices, liturgy and identity of the Church of England following the English Reformation, in the context of the Protestant Reformation in Europe. It is one of the largest branches of Christianity, with around 110 million adherents within the Anglican Communion, and approximately 2.4 million outside of the Anglican Communion, worldwide as of 2025.

Adherents of Anglicanism are called Anglicans; they are also called Episcopalians in some countries. Most are members of national or regional ecclesiastical provinces of the international Anglican Communion, one of the largest Christian bodies in the world, and the world's third-largest Christian communion. The provinces within the Anglican Communion have historically been in full communion with the See of Canterbury and thus with the archbishop of Canterbury, whom the communion refers to as its primus inter pares (Latin, 'first among equals'). The archbishop calls the decennial Lambeth Conference, chairs the meeting of primates, and is the president of the Anglican Consultative Council. Some churches that are not part of the Anglican Communion or recognised by it also call themselves Anglican, including those that are within the Continuing Anglican movement and Anglican realignment.

Anglicans base their Christian faith on the Bible, traditions of the apostolic church, and the writings of the Church Fathers, as well as, historically, the Thirty-nine Articles and The Books of Homilies.

Anglicanism forms a branch of Western Christianity, having declared its independence from the Holy See through the Act of Supremacy in 1534, a separation later consolidated by the Elizabethan Religious Settlement. The Church of England retained apostolic succession ("historic episcopate"), and the Anglican formularies of the mid-16th century correspond closely to those of historical Protestantism. In the first half of the 17th century, the Church of England and the associated Church of Ireland were presented by some Anglican divines as comprising a distinct Christian tradition, with theologies, structures, and forms of worship representing a different kind of middle way, or via media, originally between Lutheranism and Calvinism, later describing itself as "catholic and reformed". The degree of distinction between Protestant and Catholic tendencies within Anglicanism is routinely a matter of debate both within specific Anglican churches and the Anglican Communion. The Book of Common Prayer is unique to Anglicanism, the collection of services in one prayer book used for centuries. The book is acknowledged as a principal tie that binds the Anglican Communion as a liturgical tradition.

After the American Revolution, Anglican congregations in the United States and British North America (which would later form the basis for the modern country of Canada) were each reconstituted into autonomous churches with their own bishops and self-governing structures; these were known as the Protestant Episcopal Church in the United States and the Church of England in the Dominion of Canada. Through the expansion of the British Empire and the activity of Christian missions, this model was adopted as the model for many newly formed churches, especially in Africa, Australasia, and the Asia-Pacific. In the late-19th century, the term Anglicanism was coined to describe the common religious tradition of these churches and also that of the Scottish Episcopal Church, which, though originating earlier within the Church of Scotland, had come to be recognised as sharing this common identity. By the 21st century, the global centre of Anglicanism had shifted to the Global South, particularly sub-Saharan Africa, with 63,556,000 adherents in Africa, 24,400,000 in Europe, 4,565,000 in Oceania, 2,689,000 in Northern America, 1,230,000 in Asia, and 959,000 in Latin America in 2020.

== Terminology ==
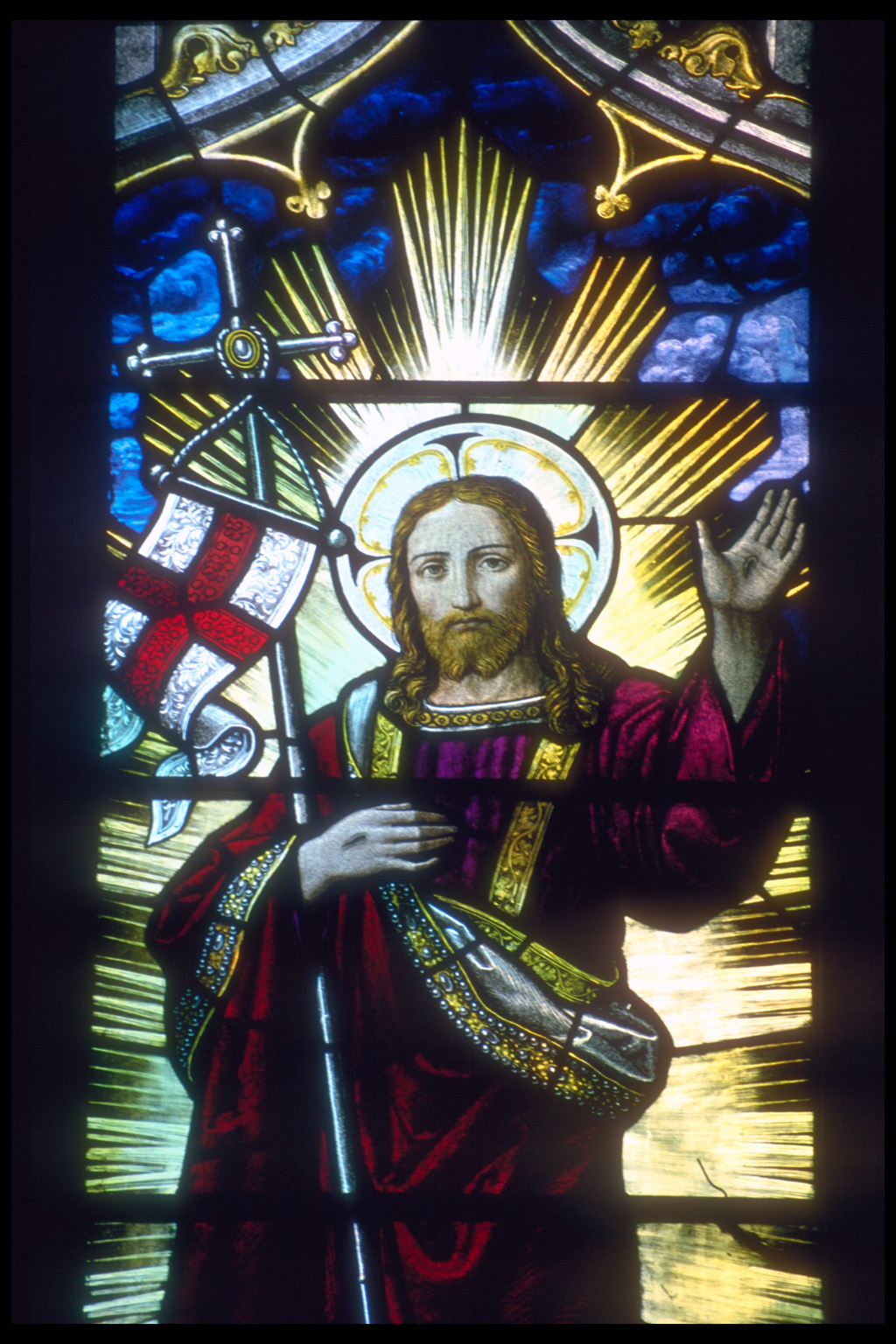
Jesus holding a flag of the Resurrection and staff in the crook of his right arm depicted in a stained glass window in Rochester Cathedral in Rochester, Kent, England

The word Anglican originates in ecclesia anglicana, a medieval Latin phrase that means the English Church. (Note: An early occurrence is found in the Magna Carta, which contains the sentence Anglicana ecclesie libera sit "the English Church shall be free".) Adherents of Anglicanism are called Anglicans. As an adjective, Anglican is used to describe the people, institutions, churches, liturgical traditions, and theological concepts developed by the Church of England.

As a noun, an Anglican is a church member in the Anglican Communion. The word is also used by followers of separated groups that have left the communion or have been founded separately from it. The word originally referred only to the teachings and rites of Christians throughout the world in communion with the see of Canterbury but has come to sometimes be extended to any church following those traditions or rites rather than actual membership in the Anglican Communion.

Although the term Anglican is found referring to the Church of England as far back as the 16th century, its use did not become general until the latter half of the 19th century. In British parliamentary legislation referring to the English Established Church, there is no need for a description; it is simply the Church of England, though the word Protestant is used in many legal acts specifying the succession to the Crown and qualifications for office. When the Union with Ireland Act created the United Church of England and Ireland, it is specified that it shall be one "Protestant Episcopal Church", thereby distinguishing its form of church government from the Presbyterian polity that prevails in the Church of Scotland.

The word Episcopal ("of or pertaining to bishops") is preferred in the title of the Episcopal Church (the province of the Anglican Communion covering the United States) and the Scottish Episcopal Church, though the full name of the former is The Protestant Episcopal Church in the United States of America. Elsewhere, however, the term Anglican Church came to be preferred as it distinguished these churches from others that maintain an episcopal polity.

=== Definition ===
In its structures, theology, and forms of worship, Anglicanism emerged as a distinct Christian tradition representing a middle ground between Lutheran and Reformed varieties of Protestantism; after the Oxford Movement, Anglicanism has often been characterized as representing a via media ('middle way') between Protestantism as a whole, and Catholicism.

The faith of Anglicans is founded in the Scriptures and the Gospels, the traditions of the Apostolic Church, the historical episcopate, the first four ecumenical councils, and the early Church Fathers, especially those active during the five initial centuries of Christianity, according to the quinquasaecularist principle proposed by the English bishop Lancelot Andrewes and the Lutheran dissident Georg Calixtus.

Anglicans understand the Old and New Testaments as "containing all things necessary for salvation" and as being the rule and ultimate standard of faith. Reason and tradition are seen as valuable means to interpret scripture (a position first formulated in detail by Richard Hooker), but there is no full mutual agreement among Anglicans about exactly how scripture, reason, and tradition interact (or ought to interact) with each other. Anglicans understand the Apostles' Creed as the baptismal symbol and the Nicene Creed as the sufficient statement of the Christian faith.

Anglicans believe the catholic and apostolic faith is revealed in Holy Scripture and the ecumenical creeds (Apostles', Nicene and Athanasian) and interpret these in light of the Christian tradition of the historic church, scholarship, reason, and experience. Anglicans celebrate the traditional sacraments, with special emphasis being given to the Eucharist, also called Holy Communion, the Lord's Supper, or the Mass. The Eucharist is central to worship for most Anglicans as a communal offering of prayer and praise in which the life, death and resurrection of Jesus Christ are proclaimed through prayer, reading of the Bible, singing, giving God thanks over the bread and wine for the innumerable benefits obtained through the passion of Christ; the breaking of the bread, the blessing of the cup, and the partaking of the body and blood of Christ as instituted at the Last Supper. The consecrated bread and wine are considered by Anglican formularies to be the true body and blood of Christ received in a spiritual manner. The sacrament is understood as being an outward and visible sign of an inward and spiritual grace given by Christ which conveys forgiveness and cleansing from sin. While many Anglicans celebrate the Eucharist in ways similar to the predominant Latin Catholic tradition, a considerable degree of liturgical freedom is permitted and worship styles range from simple to elaborate.

Unique to Anglicanism is the Book of Common Prayer (BCP), the collection of services which worshippers in most Anglican churches have used for centuries. It was called common prayer originally because it was intended for use in all Church of England churches, which had previously followed differing local liturgies. The term was kept when the church became international because all Anglicans used to share in its use around the world. In 1549, the first Book of Common Prayer was compiled by Thomas Cranmer, the then archbishop of Canterbury. While it has since undergone many revisions and Anglican churches in different countries have developed other service books, the BCP is still acknowledged as one of the ties that bind Anglicans together.

== Identity ==
=== Early history ===
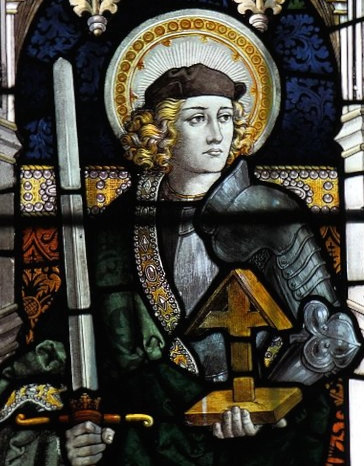
Saint Alban is venerated as the first-recorded British Christian martyr

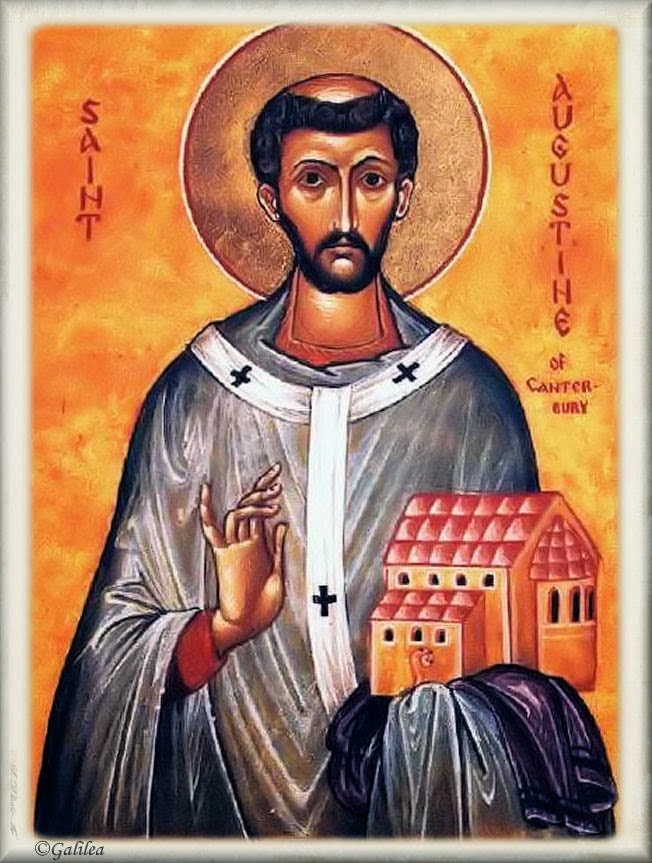
Augustine of Canterbury, the first archbishop of Canterbury

According to legend, the founding of Christianity in Britain is commonly attributed to Joseph of Arimathea and is commemorated at Glastonbury Abbey. (Note: According to John Godfrey, The most famous and beautiful legend of all related to the conversion of Britain is of course that of Joseph of Arimathea, who is said to have arrived in Britain with twelve companions in the year 63 at the bidding of the apostle Philip. According to this legend, Joseph brought with him the Holy Grail and built, at Glastonbury, the first British church.) Many of the early Church Fathers wrote of the presence of Christianity in Roman Britain, with Tertullian stating "those parts of Britain into which the Roman arms had never penetrated were become subject to Christ". Saint Alban, who was executed in AD 209, is the first Christian martyr in the British Isles. For this reason he is venerated as the British protomartyr. The historian Heinrich Zimmer writes that "Just as Britain was a part of the Roman Empire, so the British Church formed (during the fourth century) a branch of the Catholic Church of the West; and during the whole of that century, from the Council of Arles (316) onward, took part in all proceedings concerning the Church."

After Roman troops withdrew from Britain, the "absence of Roman military and governmental influence and overall decline of Roman imperial political power enabled Britain and the surrounding isles to develop distinctively from the rest of the West. A new culture emerged around the Irish Sea among the Celtic peoples with Celtic Christianity at its core. What resulted was a form of Christianity distinct from Rome in many traditions and practices." (Note: John Carey writes that 'Celtic Christianity' is a phrase used, with varying degrees of specificity, to designate a complex of features held to have been common to the Celtic-speaking countries in the early Middle Ages. Doubts concerning the term's usefulness have repeatedly been expressed, however, and the majority of scholars consider it to be problematic ... While there is considerable evidence for divergent Irish and (to an even greater degree) British practice in matters of liturgy, baptism, and ecclesiastical administration, the usages in question seem only to have characterized specific regions, and not necessarily to have been uniformly present there. Only the Britons were accused of practising a heterodox baptism; traces of an archaic liturgy in Wales find no counterpart in the eclectic, but largely Gallican, worship attested from Ireland; and the superiority of abbots to bishops appears to have been limited to some parts of Gaelic sphere of influence. In The Celtic Resource Book, Martin Wallace writes that it is important to remember that there was never any such thing as 'The Celtic Church'. It was never an organized system in the way that we understand churches today. Rather, each Celtic church was highly independent and if there was a relationship between any of them the relationship tended to be one of spiritual support through missionary endeavour, rather than through any particular church structure. It is also important to remember that the Celtic church life as it emerged in fifth-century Ireland would be quite different to that which emerged in nineteenth century Hebridean communities. Even on the mainland the patterns of church life would vary considerably from one place to another, and from one age to another.)

The historian Charles Thomas, in addition to the Celticist Heinrich Zimmer, writes that the distinction between sub-Roman and post-Roman Insular Christianity, also known as Celtic Christianity, began to become apparent around AD 475, with the Celtic churches allowing married clergy, observing Lent and Easter according to their own calendar, and having a different tonsure; moreover, like the Eastern Orthodox and the Oriental Orthodox churches, the Celtic churches operated independently of the Pope's authority, as a result of their isolated development in the British Isles.

In what is known as the Gregorian mission, Pope Gregory I sent Augustine of Canterbury to the British Isles in AD 596, with the purpose of evangelising the pagans there (who were largely Anglo-Saxons), as well as to reconcile the Celtic churches in the British Isles to the See of Rome. In Kent, Augustine persuaded the Anglo-Saxon king "Æthelberht and his people to accept Christianity". Augustine, on two occasions, "met in conference with members of the Celtic episcopacy, but no understanding was reached between them".

Eventually, the "Christian Church of the Anglo-Saxon kingdom of Northumbria convened the Synod of Whitby in 663/664 to decide whether to follow Celtic or Roman usages". This meeting, with King Oswiu as the final decision maker, "led to the acceptance of Roman usage elsewhere in England and brought the English Church into close contact with the Continent". As a result of assuming Roman usages, the Celtic Church surrendered its independence, and, from this point on, the Church in England "was no longer purely Celtic, but became Anglo-Roman-Celtic". The theologian Christopher L. Webber writes that "Although "the Roman form of Christianity became the dominant influence in Britain as in all of western Europe, Anglican Christianity has continued to have a distinctive quality because of its Celtic heritage."

Following the Synod of Whitby, tensions between Rome and the English king would gradually escalate, due in part to royal assertions that it was the custom of England for the king to exercise authority over the Church. In the late 1000s, William the Conqueror (William I) refused to swear fealty to the Pope citing English tradition, controlled appointments to ecclesiastical offices (a power historically reserved to the Pope) and forbade papal legates to enter England without royal permission. In 1164, under Henry II, the Constitutions of Clarendon, citing English custom, required royal assent for excommunications and mandated that ecclesiastical court appeals terminate with the king rather than the Pope. The Magna Carta in 1215, asserting that "the English Church shall be free, and shall have its rights undiminished, and its liberties unimpaired" would be annulled by Pope Innocent III, but reissued in both 1216 and 1225. Under Edward I, in 1279, the Statute of Mortmain required royal approval to grant or transfer land to the Church. Additionally, Edward I would reject Pope Boniface VIII's bull Clericis Laicos which forbade secular taxation of clergy. Per the king's orders, non-compliant clergy were punished by law and church property was seized. The 1351 Statute of Provisors, under Edward III, prohibited papal appointments to English benefices, reserving the power for the king. The 1353 Statute of Praemunire prohibited appeals to papal courts for either ecclesiastical or temporal matters. To date, neither the Statute of Provisors nor the Statute of Praemunire has been repealed. In 1401, Henry IV's statute De Heretico Comburendo would transfer heresy trials from ecclesiastical to secular courts, further cementing the tradition of English kings claiming authority over English ecclesiastical matters. English delegates to the Councils of Pisa (1409), Constance (1414–1418), and Basel (1431–1445) would voice support for conciliarism in an attempt to limit the powers of the Pope over-against the bishops of the Church.

The Church in England remained united with Rome until the English Parliament passed the Act of Supremacy in 1534, declaring King Henry VIII the "Supreme Head" of the Church of England. This act culminated centuries of English monarchs asserting authority over ecclesiastical matters, from William I's refusal of papal fealty (1070s) to the Statutes of Provisors (1351) and Praemunire (1353). Henry and his theologians, including Thomas Cranmer, cited these historical customs to justify royal supremacy, arguing that the crown traditionally governed the Church. The immediate catalyst was Henry's need to annul his 24-year marriage to Catherine of Aragon, which he believed was invalid based on biblical prohibitions (Leviticus 20:21) and the lack of a male heir, seen as divine judgment. When Pope Clement VII, under pressure from Emperor Charles V, refused the annulment, Henry acted to resolve the issue domestically, supported by legislative steps like the Submission of the Clergy (1534) and Act in Restraint of Appeals (1533). The break with Rome reflected a mix of theological conviction, historical precedent, and political necessity, fulfilling a longstanding English desire for ecclesiastical autonomy while addressing immediate dynastic concerns. This laid the foundation for the development of Anglicanism as a distinct national church.

The English Church under Henry VIII continued to maintain Catholic doctrines and liturgical celebrations of the sacraments despite its separation from Rome. With little exception, Henry VIII allowed no changes during his lifetime. Under King Edward VI (1547–1553), however, the church in England first began to undergo what is known as the English Reformation, in the course of which it acquired a number of characteristics that would subsequently become recognised as constituting its distinctive "Anglican" identity.

=== Development ===
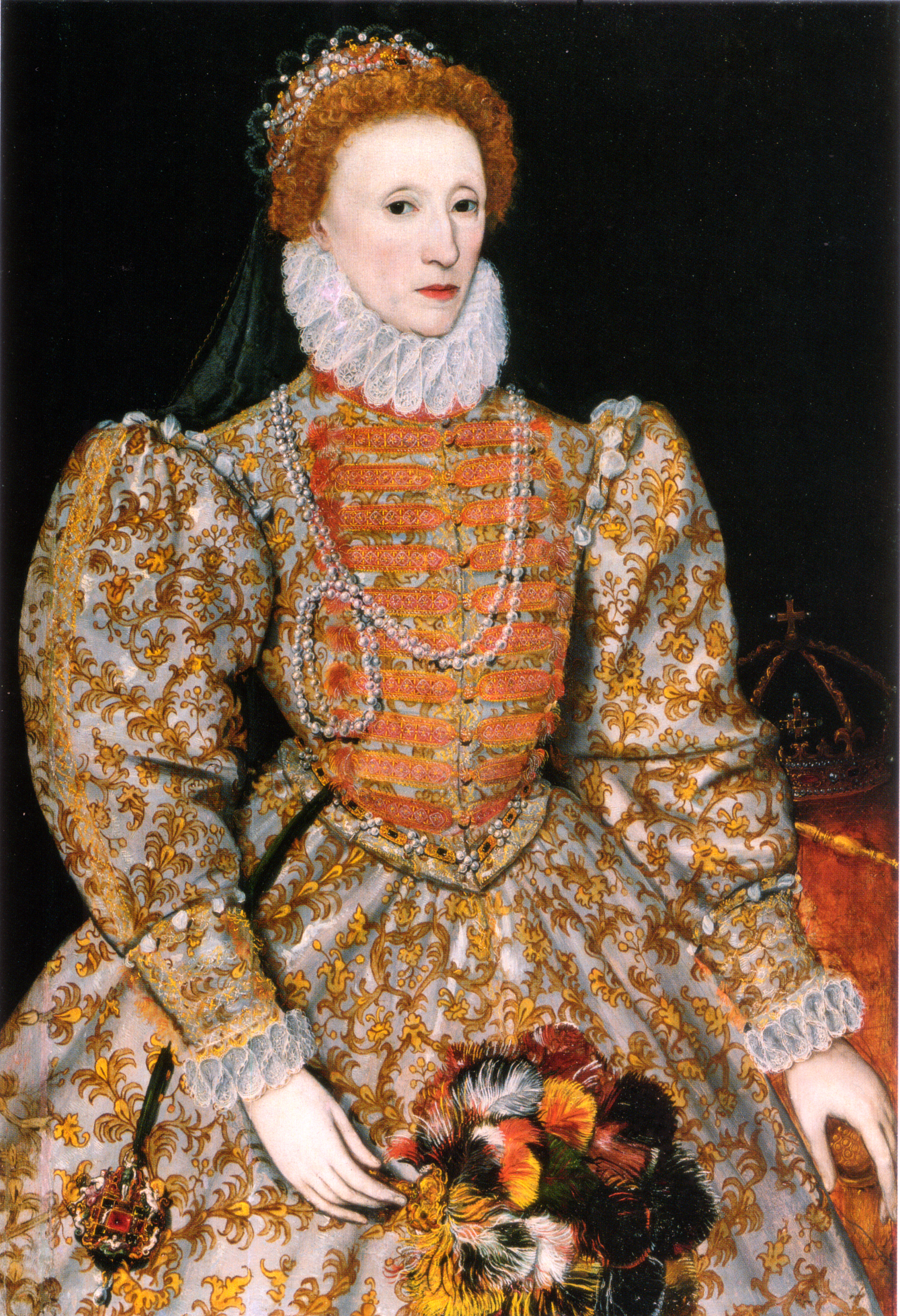
Queen Elizabeth I revived the Church of England in 1559 and established a uniform faith and practice; she took the title "Supreme Governor"

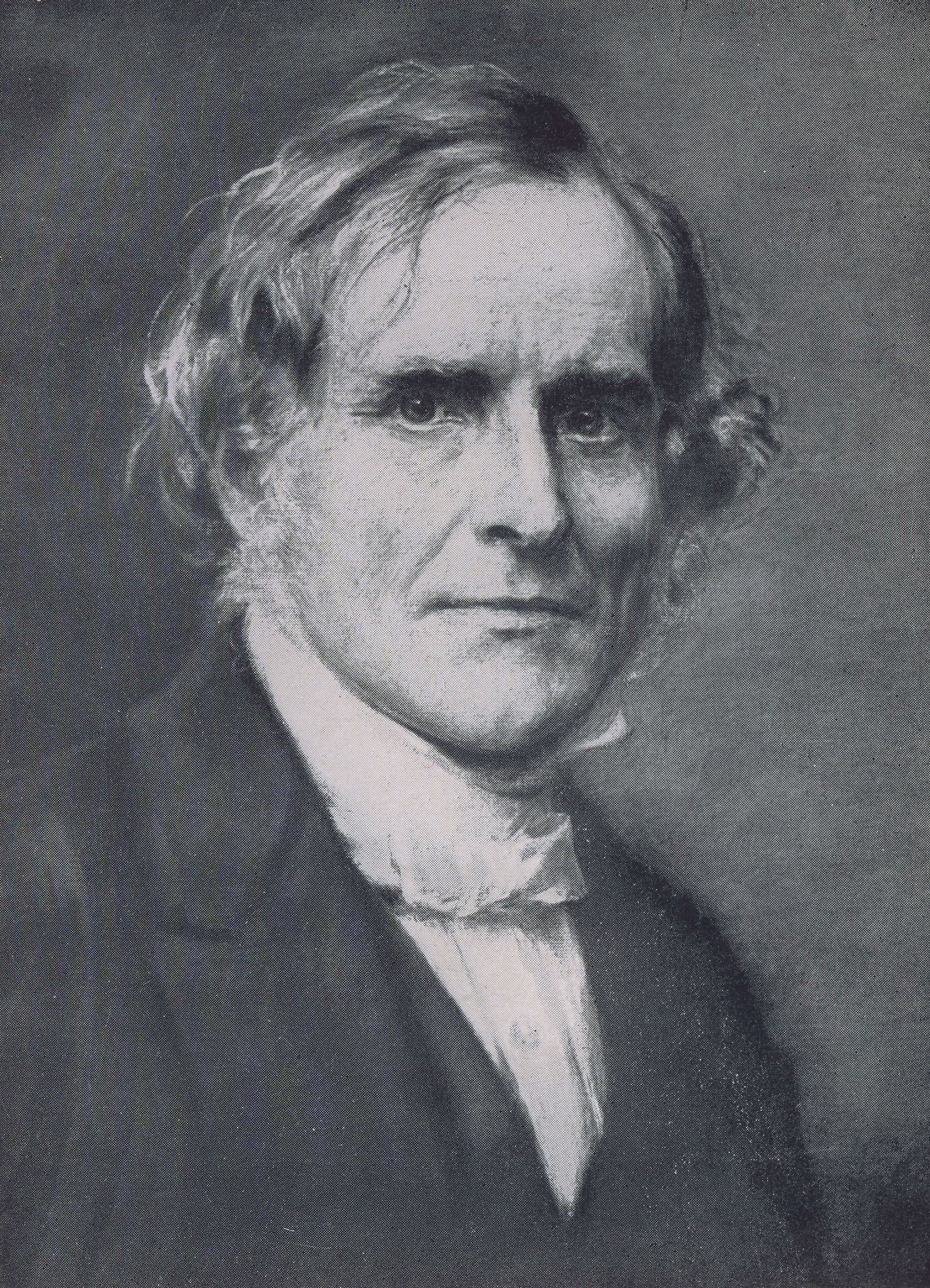
Frederick Denison Maurice, a prominent 19th-century Anglican theologian

With the Elizabethan Settlement of 1559, the Protestant identity of the English and Irish churches was affirmed by means of parliamentary legislation which mandated allegiance and loyalty to the English Crown in all their members. The Elizabethan church began to develop distinct religious traditions, assimilating some of the theology of Reformed churches with the services in the Book of Common Prayer (which drew extensively on the Sarum Rite native to England), under the leadership and organisation of a continuing episcopate. Over the years, these traditions came to command adherence and loyalty. The Elizabethan Settlement stopped the radical Protestant tendencies under Edward VI by combining the more radical elements of the 1552 prayer book with the conservative "Catholic" 1549 prayer book into the 1559 Book of Common Prayer. From then on, Protestantism was in a "state of arrested development", regardless of the attempts to detach the Church of England from its "idiosyncratic anchorage in the medieval past" by various groups which tried to push it towards a more Reformed theology and governance in the years 1560–1660.

Although two important constitutive elements of what later would emerge as Anglicanism were present in 1559 – scripture, the historic episcopate, the Book of Common Prayer, the teachings of the First Four Ecumenical Councils as the yardstick of catholicity, the teaching of the Church Fathers and Catholic bishops, and informed reason – neither the laypeople nor the clergy perceived themselves as Anglicans at the beginning of Elizabeth I's reign, as there was no such identity. Neither does the term via media appear until the 1627 to describe a church which refused to identify itself definitely as Catholic or Protestant, or as both, "and had decided in the end that this is virtue rather than a handicap".

Historical studies on the period 1560–1660 written before the late 1960s tended to project the predominant conformist spirituality and doctrine of the 1660s on the ecclesiastical situation one hundred years before, and there was also a tendency to take polemically binary partitions of reality claimed by contestants studied (such as the dichotomies Protestant-"Popish" or "Laudian"-"Puritan") at face value. Since the late 1960s, these interpretations have been criticised. Studies on the subject written during the last forty-five years have, however, not reached any consensus on how to interpret this period in English church history. The extent to which one or several positions concerning doctrine and spirituality existed alongside the more well-known and articulate Puritan movement and the Durham House Party, and the exact extent of continental Calvinism among the English elite and among the ordinary churchgoers from the 1560s to the 1620s are subjects of current and ongoing debate. (Note: For a study stressing the hegemony of continental Calvinism before the 1620s, see Tyacke 1987. For a study perceiving an emerging self-conscious "Prayer Book Episcopalism" distinct from, but a predecessor to, Restoration Anglicanism, see Maltby 1998.)

In 1662, under King Charles II, a revised Book of Common Prayer was produced, which was acceptable to high churchmen as well as some Puritans and is still considered authoritative to this day. In so far as Anglicans derived their identity from both parliamentary legislation and ecclesiastical tradition, a crisis of identity could result wherever secular and religious loyalties came into conflict – and such a crisis indeed occurred in 1776 with the United States Declaration of Independence, most of whose signatories were, at least nominally, Anglican. For these American patriots, even the forms of Anglican services were in doubt, since the Prayer Book rites of Matins, Evensong, and Holy Communion all included specific prayers for the British royal family. Consequently, the conclusion of the War of Independence eventually resulted in the creation of two new Anglican churches, the Episcopal Church in the United States in those states that had achieved independence; and in the 1830s, the Church of England in Canada became independent from the Church of England in those North American colonies which had remained under British control and to which many Loyalist churchmen had migrated.

Reluctantly, legislation was passed in the British Parliament (the Consecration of Bishops Abroad Act 1786) to allow bishops to be consecrated for an American church outside of allegiance to the British Crown (since no dioceses had ever been established in the former American colonies). Both in the United States and in Canada, the new Anglican churches developed novel models of self-government, collective decision-making, and self-supported financing; that would be consistent with separation of religious and secular identities.

In the following century, two further factors acted to accelerate the development of a distinct Anglican identity. From 1828 and 1829, Dissenters and Catholics could be elected to the House of Commons, which consequently ceased to be a body drawn purely from the established churches of Scotland, England, and Ireland; but which nevertheless, over the following ten years, engaged in extensive reforming legislation affecting the interests of the English and Irish churches; which, by the Acts of Union of 1800, had been reconstituted as the United Church of England and Ireland (a union which was dissolved in 1871). The propriety of this legislation was bitterly contested by the Oxford Movement (Tractarians), who in response developed a vision of Anglicanism as religious tradition deriving ultimately from the ecumenical councils of the patristic church. Those within the Church of England opposed to the Tractarians, and to their revived ritual practices, introduced a stream of bills in parliament aimed to control innovations in worship. This only made the dilemma more acute, with consequent continual litigation in the secular and ecclesiastical courts.

Over the same period, Anglican churches engaged vigorously in Christian missions, resulting in the creation, by the end of the century, of over ninety colonial bishoprics, which gradually coalesced into new self-governing churches on the Canadian and American models. However, the case of John Colenso, Bishop of Natal, reinstated in 1865 by the English Judicial Committee of the Privy Council over the heads of the Church in South Africa, demonstrated acutely that the extension of episcopacy had to be accompanied by a recognised Anglican ecclesiology of ecclesiastical authority, distinct from secular power.

Consequently, at the instigation of the bishops of Canada and South Africa, the first Lambeth Conference was called in 1867; to be followed by further conferences in 1878 and 1888, and thereafter at ten-year intervals. The various papers and declarations of successive Lambeth Conferences have served to frame the continued Anglican debate on identity, especially as relating to the possibility of ecumenical discussion with other churches. This ecumenical aspiration became much more of a possibility, as other denominational groups rapidly followed the example of the Anglican Communion in founding their own transnational alliances: the Alliance of Reformed Churches, the Ecumenical Methodist Council, the International Congregational Council, and the Baptist World Alliance.

=== Theories ===
Leaders of the Tractarian movement

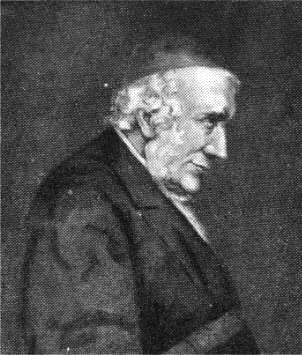
Edward Bouverie Pusey

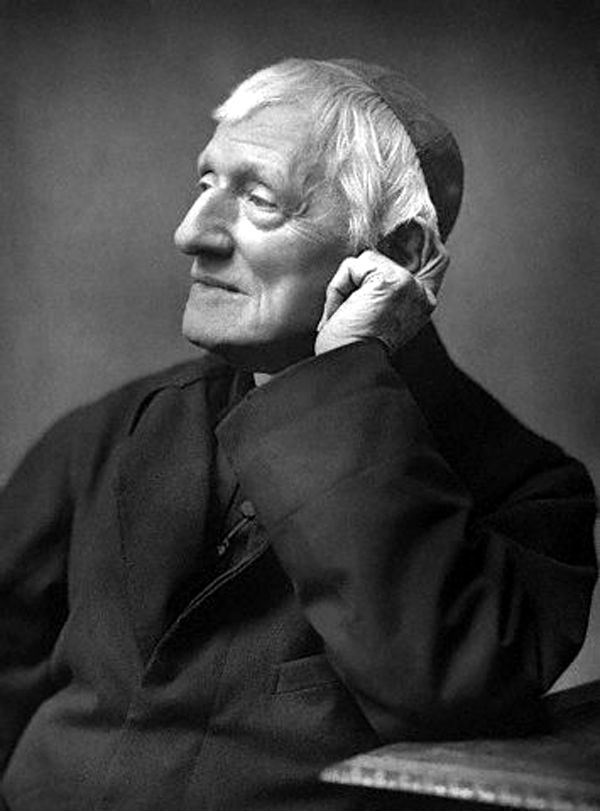
John Henry Newman

Anglicanism was seen as a middle way, or via media, between two branches of Protestantism, Lutheranism and Reformed Christianity. In their rejection of absolute parliamentary authority, the Tractarians, especially John Henry Newman, looked back to the writings of 17th-century Anglican divines, finding in these texts the idea of the English church as a via media between the Protestant and Catholic traditions. This view was associated – especially in the writings of Edward Bouverie Pusey – with the theory of Anglicanism as one of three "branches" (alongside the Catholic Church and the Orthodox Churches) historically arising out of the common tradition of the earliest ecumenical councils. Newman himself subsequently rejected his theory of the via media, as essentially historicist and static and hence unable to accommodate any dynamic development within the church. Nevertheless, the aspiration to ground Anglican identity in the writings of the 17th-century divines and in faithfulness to the traditions of the Church Fathers reflects a continuing theme of Anglican ecclesiology, most recently in the writings of Henry Robert McAdoo.

The Tractarian formulation of the theory of the via media between Protestantism and Catholicism was essentially a party platform, and not acceptable to Anglicans outside the confines of the Oxford Movement. However, this theory of the via media was reworked in the ecclesiological writings of Frederick Denison Maurice, in a more dynamic form that became widely influential. Both Maurice and Newman saw the Church of England of their day as sorely deficient in faith; but whereas Newman had looked back to a distant past when the light of faith might have appeared to burn brighter, Maurice looked forward to the possibility of a brighter revelation of faith in the future. Maurice saw the Protestant and Catholic strands within the Church of England as contrary but complementary, both maintaining elements of the true church, but incomplete without the other; such that a true catholic and evangelical church might come into being by a union of opposites.

Central to Maurice's perspective was his belief that the collective elements of family, nation, and church represented a divine order of structures through which God unfolds his continuing work of creation. Hence, for Maurice, the Protestant tradition had maintained the elements of national distinction which were amongst the marks of the true universal church, but which had been lost within contemporary Catholicism in the internationalism of centralised papal authority. Within the coming universal church that Maurice foresaw, national churches would each maintain the six signs of catholicity: baptism, Eucharist, the creeds, Scripture, an episcopal ministry, and a fixed liturgy (which could take a variety of forms in accordance with divinely ordained distinctions in national characteristics). This vision of a becoming universal church as a congregation of autonomous national churches proved highly congenial in Anglican circles; and Maurice's six signs were adapted to form the Chicago-Lambeth Quadrilateral of 1888.

In the latter decades of the 20th century, Maurice's theory, and the various strands of Anglican thought that derived from it, have been criticised by Stephen Sykes, who argues that the terms Protestant and Catholic as used in these approaches are synthetic constructs denoting ecclesiastic identities unacceptable to those to whom the labels are applied. Hence, the Catholic Church does not regard itself as a party or strand within the universal church – but rather identifies itself as the universal church. Moreover, Sykes criticises the proposition, implicit in theories of via media, that there is no distinctive body of Anglican doctrines, other than those of the universal church; accusing this of being an excuse not to undertake systematic doctrine at all.

Contrariwise, Sykes notes a high degree of commonality in Anglican liturgical forms and in the doctrinal understandings expressed within those liturgies. He proposes that Anglican identity might rather be found within a shared consistent pattern of prescriptive liturgies, established and maintained through canon law, and embodying both a historic deposit of formal statements of doctrine, and also framing the regular reading and proclamation of scripture. Sykes nevertheless agrees with those heirs of Maurice who emphasise the incompleteness of Anglicanism as a positive feature, and quotes with qualified approval the words of Michael Ramsey:

For while the Anglican church is vindicated by its place in history, with a strikingly balanced witness to Gospel and Church and sound learning, its greater vindication lies in its pointing through its own history to something of which it is a fragment. Its credentials are its incompleteness, with the tension and the travail of its soul. It is clumsy and untidy, it baffles neatness and logic. For it is not sent to commend itself as 'the best type of Christianity,' but by its very brokenness to point to the universal Church wherein all have died.

== Doctrine ==
=== "Catholic and reformed" ===
The distinction between Reformed and Catholic, and the coherence of the two, is a matter of debate within the Anglican Communion. The Oxford Movement of the mid-19th century revived and extended doctrinal, liturgical, and pastoral practices similar to those of Roman Catholicism. This extends beyond the ceremony of high church services to even more theologically significant territory, such as sacramental theology (see Anglican sacraments). While Anglo-Catholic practices, particularly liturgical ones, have become more common within the tradition over the last century, there are also places where practices and beliefs resonate more closely with the evangelical movements of the 1730s (see Sydney Anglicanism).

=== Guiding principles ===
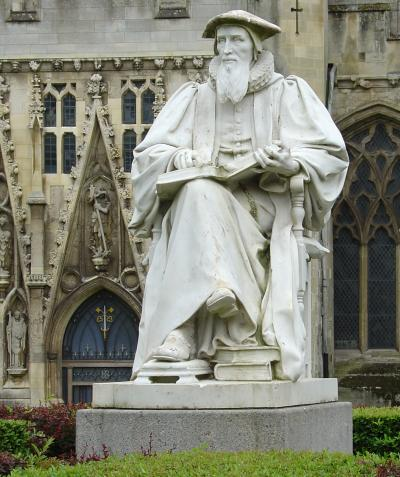
Richard Hooker (1554–1600), one of the most influential figures in shaping Anglican theology and self-identity

For high-church Anglicans, doctrine is neither established by a magisterium, nor derived from the theology of an eponymous founder (such as Calvinism), nor summed up in a confession of faith beyond the ecumenical creeds, such as the Lutheran Book of Concord. For them, the earliest Anglican theological documents are its prayer books, which they see as the products of profound theological reflection, compromise, and synthesis. They emphasise the Book of Common Prayer as a key expression of Anglican doctrine. The principle of looking to the prayer books as a guide to the parameters of belief and practice is called by the Latin name lex orandi, lex credendi ("the law of prayer is the law of belief").

Within the prayer books are the fundamentals of Anglican doctrine: the Apostles' and Nicene creeds, the Athanasian Creed (now rarely used), the scriptures (via the lectionary), the sacraments, daily prayer, the catechism, and apostolic succession in the context of the historic threefold ministry. For some low-church and evangelical Anglicans, the 16th-century Reformed Thirty-Nine Articles form the basis of doctrine.

==== Distinctives of Anglican belief ====
The Thirty-Nine Articles played a significant role in Anglican doctrine and practice. Following the passing of the 1604 canons, all Anglican clergy had to formally subscribe to the articles. Today, however, the articles are no longer binding, but are seen as a historical document which has played a significant role in the shaping of Anglican identity. The degree to which each of the articles has remained influential varies.

On the doctrine of justification, for example, there is a wide range of beliefs within the Anglican Communion, with some Anglo-Catholics arguing for a faith with good works and the sacraments. At the same time, however, some evangelical Anglicans ascribe to the Reformed emphasis on sola fide ("faith alone") in their doctrine of justification (see Sydney Anglicanism). Still other Anglicans adopt a nuanced view of justification, taking elements from the early Church Fathers, Catholicism, Protestantism, liberal theology, and latitudinarian thought.

Arguably, the most influential of the original articles has been Article VI on the "sufficiency of scripture", which says that "Scripture containeth all things necessary to salvation: so that whatsoever is not read therein, nor may be proved thereby, is not to be required of any man, that it should be believed as an article of the Faith, or be thought requisite or necessary to salvation." This article has informed Anglican biblical exegesis and hermeneutics since earliest times.

Anglicans look for authority in their "standard divines" (see below). Historically, the most influential of these – apart from Cranmer – has been the 16th-century cleric and theologian Richard Hooker, who after 1660 was increasingly portrayed as the founding father of Anglicanism. Hooker's description of Anglican authority as being derived primarily from scripture, informed by reason (the intellect and the experience of God) and tradition (the practices and beliefs of the historical church), has influenced Anglican self-identity and doctrinal reflection perhaps more powerfully than any other formula. The analogy of the "three-legged stool" of scripture, reason, and tradition is often incorrectly attributed to Hooker. Rather, Hooker's description is a hierarchy of authority, with scripture as foundational and reason and tradition as vitally important, but secondary, authorities.

Finally, the extension of Anglicanism into non-English cultures, the growing diversity of prayer books, and the increasing interest in ecumenical dialogue have led to further reflection on the parameters of Anglican identity. Many Anglicans look to the Chicago-Lambeth Quadrilateral of 1888 as the sine qua non of communal identity. In brief, the quadrilateral's four points are the scriptures as containing all things necessary to salvation; the creeds (specifically, the Apostles' and Nicene Creeds) as the sufficient statement of Christian faith; the dominical sacraments of Baptism and Holy Communion; and the historic episcopate.

=== Divines ===
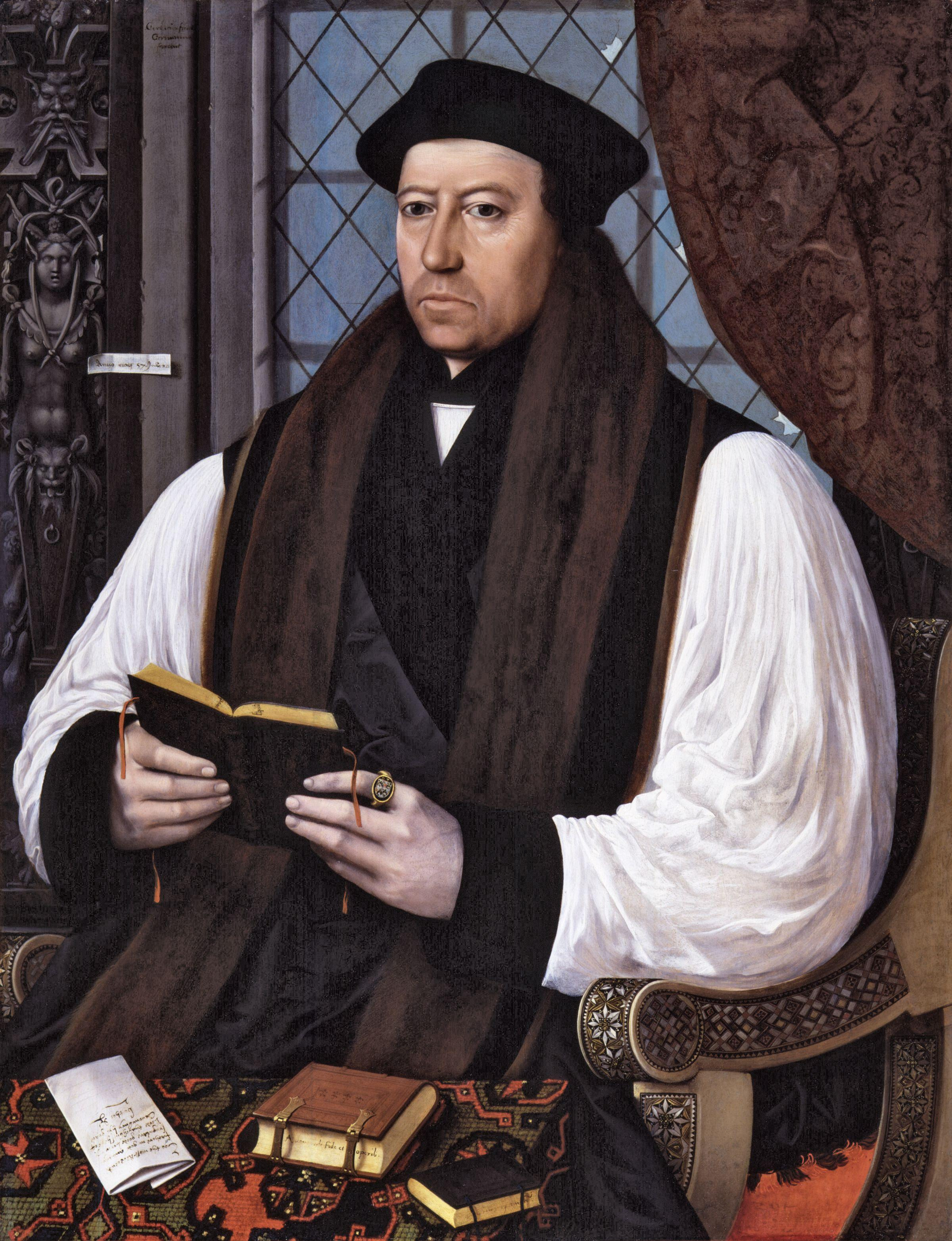
Thomas Cranmer, author of the first two editions of the Book of Common Prayer

Within the Anglican tradition, "divines" are clergy of the Church of England whose theological writings have been considered standards for faith, doctrine, worship, and spirituality, and whose influence has permeated the Anglican Communion in varying degrees through the years. While there is no authoritative list of these Anglican divines, there are some whose names would likely be found on most lists – those who are commemorated in lesser feasts of the Anglican churches and those whose works are frequently anthologised.

The corpus produced by Anglican divines is diverse. What they have in common is a commitment to the faith as conveyed by scripture and the Book of Common Prayer, thus regarding prayer and theology in a manner akin to that of the Apostolic Fathers. On the whole, Anglican divines view the via media of Anglicanism not as a compromise, but as "a positive position, witnessing to the universality of God and God's kingdom working through the fallible, earthly ecclesia Anglicana".

These theologians regard scripture as interpreted through tradition and reason as authoritative in matters concerning salvation. Reason and tradition, indeed, are extant in and presupposed by scripture, thus implying co-operation between God and humanity, God and nature, and between the sacred and secular. Faith is thus regarded as incarnational and authority as dispersed.

Amongst the early Anglican divines of the 16th and 17th centuries, the names of Thomas Cranmer, John Jewel, Matthew Parker, Richard Hooker, Lancelot Andrewes, and Jeremy Taylor predominate. The influential character of Hooker's Of the Laws of Ecclesiastical Polity cannot be overestimated. Published in 1593 and subsequently, Hooker's eight-volume work is primarily a treatise on church-state relations, but it deals comprehensively with issues of biblical interpretation, soteriology, ethics, and sanctification. Throughout the work, Hooker makes clear that theology involves prayer and is concerned with ultimate issues and that theology is relevant to the social mission of the church.

The 17th century saw the rise of two important movements in Anglicanism: Cambridge Platonism, with its mystical understanding of reason as the "candle of the Lord", and the Evangelical Revival, with its emphasis on the personal experience of the Holy Spirit. The Cambridge Platonist movement evolved into a school called Latitudinarianism, which emphasised reason as the barometer of discernment and took a stance of indifference towards doctrinal and ecclesiological differences.

The Evangelical Revival, influenced by such figures as John Wesley and Charles Simeon, re-emphasised the importance of justification through faith and the consequent importance of personal conversion. Some in this movement, such as Wesley and George Whitefield, took the message to the United States, influencing the First Great Awakening and creating an Anglo-American movement called Methodism that would eventually break away, structurally, from the Anglican churches after the American Revolution.

By the 19th century, there was a renewed interest in pre-Reformation English religious thought and practice. Theologians such as John Keble, Edward Bouverie Pusey, and John Henry Newman had widespread influence in the realm of polemics, homiletics and theological and devotional works, not least because they largely repudiated the old high-church tradition and replaced it with a dynamic appeal to antiquity which looked beyond the Reformers and Anglican formularies. Their work is largely credited with the development of the Oxford Movement, which sought to reassert Catholic identity and practice in Anglicanism.

In contrast to this movement, clergy such as the Bishop of Liverpool, J. C. Ryle, sought to uphold the distinctly Reformed identity of the Church of England. He was not a servant of the status quo, but argued for a lively religion which emphasised grace, holy and charitable living, and the plain use of the 1662 Book of Common Prayer (interpreted in a partisan evangelical way) (Note: The 19th-century evangelical interpretation of the Prayerbook, now less frequent, included celebration of Holy Communion while the priest was standing at the northern short side of the communion table. This misinterpretation was caused by the fact that the 1662 Book of Common Prayer retained two contradictory rubrics. From 1552 a rubric was retained that the priest should stand at the northern long side of a communion table standing east-west in the choir (the communicants sitting in the choir stalls by the northern and southern walls). From 1559 was retained the rubric that 'the chancels shall remain as they have done in times past', originally intended to protect the mediaeval interior of church buildings from Calvinist vandalism, and – mainly neglected during the reigns of Elizabeth I and James I – it was not consented to generally before the reign of Charles II. During the reign of Elizabeth I, only the chapels royal retained the mediaeval position of the communion table, standing permanently north-south at the east wall of the choir. The parish of St. Giles Cripplegate, London, began to apply the Chapels Royal arrangement of the communion table in 1599 or 1605, and from there it began to spread. Archbishop William Laud's attempt to make it mandatory in the 1630s backfired, with well known consequences. By the reign of Charles II, however, it was applied generally, and the original intention of the northward position rubric became unintelligible, and easily misunderstood.) without additional rituals. Frederick Denison Maurice, through such works as The Kingdom of Christ, played a pivotal role in inaugurating another movement, Christian socialism. In this, Maurice transformed Hooker's emphasis on the incarnational nature of Anglican spirituality to an imperative for social justice.

In the 19th century, Anglican biblical scholarship began to assume a distinct character, represented by the so-called "Cambridge triumvirate" of Joseph Lightfoot, F. J. A. Hort, and Brooke Foss Westcott. Their orientation is best summed up by Westcott's observation that "Life which Christ is and which Christ communicates, the life which fills our whole beings as we realise its capacities, is active fellowship with God."

The earlier part of the 20th century is marked by Charles Gore, with his emphasis on natural revelation, and William Temple's focus on Christianity and society, while, from outside England, Robert Leighton, Archbishop of Glasgow, and several clergy from the United States have been suggested, such as William Porcher DuBose, John Henry Hobart (1775–1830, Bishop of New York 1816–30), William Meade, Phillips Brooks, and Charles Brent.

=== Churchmanship ===
An eastward-facing Solemn High Mass, a Catholic liturgical phenomenon which reemerged in Anglicanism following the Catholic Revival of the 19th century

Churchmanship can be defined as the manifestation of theology in the realms of liturgy, piety and, to some extent, spirituality. Anglican diversity in this respect has tended to reflect the diversity in the tradition's Reformed and Catholic identity. Different individuals, groups, parishes, dioceses and provinces may identify more closely with one or the other, or some mixture of the two.

The range of Anglican belief and practice became particularly divisive during the 19th century, when some clergy were disciplined and even imprisoned on charges of introducing illegal ritual while, at the same time, others were criticised for engaging in public worship services with ministers of Reformed churches. Resistance to the growing acceptance and restoration of traditional Catholic ceremonial by the mainstream of Anglicanism ultimately led to the formation of small breakaway churches such as the Free Church of England in England (1844) and the Reformed Episcopal Church in North America (1873).

Anglo-Catholic (and some broad-church) Anglicans celebrate public liturgy in ways that understand worship to be something very special and of utmost importance. Vestments are worn by the clergy, sung settings are often used, and incense may be used. Nowadays, in most Anglican churches, the Eucharist is celebrated in a manner similar to the usage of Roman Catholics and some Lutherans, though, in many churches, more traditional, "pre–Vatican II" models of worship are common (e.g., an "eastward orientation" at the altar). Whilst many Anglo-Catholics derive much of their liturgical practice from that of the pre-Reformation English church, others more closely follow traditional Roman Catholic practices.

The Eucharist may sometimes be celebrated in the form known as High Mass, with a priest, deacon and subdeacon (usually actually a layman) dressed in traditional vestments, with incense and sanctus bells and prayers adapted from the Roman Missal or other sources by the celebrant. Such churches may also have forms of eucharistic adoration such as Benediction of the Blessed Sacrament. In terms of personal piety, some Anglicans may recite the Rosary and Angelus, be involved in a devotional society dedicated to "Our Lady" (the Blessed Virgin Mary) and seek the intercession of the saints.

In recent decades, the prayer books of several provinces have, out of deference to a greater agreement with Eastern Conciliarism (and a perceived greater respect accorded Anglicanism by Eastern Orthodoxy than by Roman Catholicism), instituted a number of historically Eastern and Oriental Orthodox elements in their liturgies, including introduction of the Trisagion and deletion of the filioque clause from the Nicene Creed.

For their part, those evangelical (and some broad-church) Anglicans who emphasise the more Protestant aspects of the Church stress the Reformation theme of salvation by grace through faith. They emphasise the two dominical sacraments of Baptism and Eucharist, viewing the other five as "lesser rites". Some evangelical Anglicans may even tend to take the inerrancy of scripture literally, adopting the view of Article VI that it contains all things necessary to salvation in an explicit sense. Worship in churches influenced by these principles tends to be significantly less elaborate, with greater emphasis on the Liturgy of the Word (the reading of the scriptures, the sermon, and the intercessory prayers).

The Order for Holy Communion may be celebrated bi-weekly or monthly (in preference to the daily offices), by priests attired in choir habit, or more regular clothes, rather than Eucharistic vestments. Ceremony may be in keeping with their view of the provisions of the 17th-century Puritans – being a Reformed interpretation of the Ornaments Rubric – no candles, no incense, no bells, and a minimum of manual actions by the presiding celebrant (such as touching the elements at the Words of Institution).

In the early 21st century, there has been a growth of charismatic worship among Anglicans. Both Anglo-Catholics and evangelicals have been affected by this movement such that it is not uncommon to find typically charismatic postures, music, and other themes evident during the services of otherwise Anglo-Catholic or evangelical parishes.

The spectrum of Anglican beliefs and practice is too large to be fit into these labels. Many Anglicans locate themselves somewhere in the spectrum of the broad-church tradition and consider themselves an amalgam of evangelical and Catholic. Such Anglicans stress that Anglicanism is the via media (middle way) between the two major strains of Western Christianity and that Anglicanism is like a "bridge" between the two strains.

=== Sacramental doctrine and practice ===
In accord with its prevailing self-identity as a via media or "middle path" of Western Christianity, Anglican sacramental theology expresses elements in keeping with its status as being both a church in the Catholic tradition as well as a Reformed church. With respect to sacramental theology, the Catholic heritage is perhaps most strongly asserted in the importance Anglicanism places on the sacraments as a means of grace, sanctification, and salvation, as expressed in the church's liturgy and doctrine.

Of the seven sacraments, all Anglicans recognise Baptism and the Eucharist as being directly instituted by Christ. The other five – Confession/Absolution, Matrimony, Confirmation, Holy Orders (also called Ordination), and Anointing of the Sick (also called Unction) – are regarded variously as full sacraments by Anglo-Catholics and many high church and some broad-church Anglicans, but merely as "sacramental rites" by other broad-church and low-church Anglicans, especially evangelicals associated with Reform UK and the Diocese of Sydney. The Thirty-Nine Articles say that there are only two sacraments.

==== Eucharistic theology ====
Anglican eucharistic theology is divergent in practice, reflecting the essential comprehensiveness of the tradition. A few low-church Anglicans take a strictly memorialist (Zwinglian) view of the sacrament. In other words, they see Holy Communion as a memorial to Christ's suffering, and participation in the Eucharist as both a re-enactment of the Last Supper and a foreshadowing of the heavenly banquet – the fulfilment of the eucharistic promise.

Other low-church Anglicans believe in the real presence of Christ in the Eucharist but deny that the presence of Christ is carnal or is necessarily localised in the bread and wine. Despite explicit criticism in the Thirty-Nine Articles, many high-church or Anglo-Catholic Anglicans hold, more or less, the Catholic view of the real presence as expressed in the doctrine of transubstantiation, seeing the Eucharist as a liturgical representation of Christ's atoning sacrifice with the elements actually transformed into Christ's body and blood.

The majority of Anglicans, however, have in common a belief in the real presence, defined in one way or another. To that extent, they are in the company of the continental reformer Martin Luther and Calvin rather than Ulrich Zwingli. The Catechism of the American BCP of 1976 repeats the standard Anglican view ("The outward and visible sign in the Eucharist is the bread and wine"..."The inward and spiritual grace in the Holy Communion is the Body and Blood of Christ given to his people, and received by faith") without further definition. It should be remembered that Anglicanism has no official doctrine on this matter, believing it is wiser to leave the Presence a mystery. The faithful can believe privately whatever explanation they favour, be it transubstantiation, consubstantiation, receptionism, or virtualism (the two most congenial to Anglicans for centuries until the Oxford Movement), each of which espouses belief in the real presence in one way or another, or memorialism, which has never been an option with Anglicans.

A famous Anglican aphorism regarding Christ's presence in the sacrament, commonly misattributed to Queen Elizabeth I, is first found in print in a poem by John Donne:

He was the word that spake it,
He took the bread and brake it:
And what that word did make it,
I do believe and take it.

An Anglican position on the eucharistic sacrifice ("Sacrifice of the Mass") was expressed in the response Saepius officio of the archbishops of Canterbury and York to Pope Leo XIII's papal encyclical Apostolicae curae: viz. that the Prayer Book contained a strong sacrificial theology. Later revisions of the Prayer Book influenced by the Scottish Canon of 1764 first adopted by the Protestant Episcopal Church in 1789 made this assertion quite evident: "we do make and celebrate before thy Divine Majesty with these thy holy gifts, which we now offer unto thee, the memorial thy Son has commanded us to make", which is repeated in the 1929 English BCP and included in such words or others such as "present" or "show forth" in subsequent revisions.

Anglican and Roman Catholic representatives declared that they had "substantial agreement on the doctrine of the Eucharist" in the Windsor Statement on Eucharistic Doctrine by the Anglican-Roman Catholic International Consultation (1971) and the Elucidation of the ARCIC Windsor Statement (1979). The final response (1991) to these documents by the Vatican made it plain that it did not consider the degree of agreement reached to be satisfactory.

== Practices ==
In Anglicanism there is a distinction between liturgy, which is the formal public and communal worship of the church, and personal prayer and devotion, which may be public or private. Liturgy is regulated by the prayer books and consists of the Eucharist (some call it Holy Communion or Mass), the other six sacraments, and the daily offices such as Morning Prayer and Evening Prayer.

=== Book of Common Prayer ===
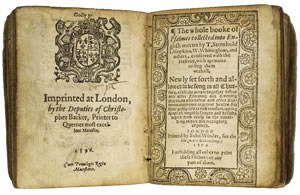
The 1596 Book of Common Prayer

The Book of Common Prayer (BCP) is the foundational prayer book of Anglicanism. The original book of 1549 (revised in 1552) was one of the instruments of the English Reformation, replacing the various "uses" or rites in Latin that had been used in different parts of the country with a single compact volume in the language of the people, so that "now from henceforth all the Realm shall have but one use". Suppressed under Queen Mary I, it was revised in 1559, and then again in 1662, after the Restoration of Charles II. This version was made mandatory in England and Wales by the Act of Uniformity and was in standard use until the mid-20th century.

With British colonial expansion from the 17th century onwards, Anglican churches were planted around the globe. These churches at first used and then revised the Book of Common Prayer until they, like their parent church, produced prayer books which took into account the developments in liturgical study and practice in the 19th and 20th centuries, which come under the general heading of the Liturgical Movement.

=== Worship ===
Anglican worship services are open to all visitors. Anglican worship originates principally in the reforms of Thomas Cranmer, who aimed to create a set order of service like that of the pre-Reformation church but less complex in its seasonal variety and said in English rather than Latin. This use of a set order of service is not unlike the Catholic tradition. Traditionally, the pattern was that laid out in the Book of Common Prayer. Although many Anglican churches now use a wide range of modern service books written in the local language, the structures of the Book of Common Prayer are largely retained. Churches which call themselves Anglican will have identified themselves so because they use some form or variant of the Book of Common Prayer in the shaping of their worship.

Anglican worship, however, is as diverse as Anglican theology. A contemporary "low church" service may differ little from the worship of many mainstream non-Anglican Protestant churches. The service is constructed around a sermon focused on Biblical exposition and opened with one or more Bible readings and closed by a series of prayers (both set and extemporised) and hymns or songs. A "high church" or Anglo-Catholic service, by contrast, is usually a more formal liturgy celebrated by clergy in distinctive vestments and may be almost indistinguishable from a Roman Catholic service, often resembling the "pre–Vatican II" Tridentine rite.

Between these extremes are a variety of styles of worship, often involving a robed choir and the use of the organ to accompany the singing and to provide music before and after the service. Anglican churches tend to have pews or chairs, and it is usual for the congregation to kneel for some prayers but to stand for hymns and other parts of the service such as the Gloria, Collect, Gospel reading, Creed and either the Preface or all of the Eucharistic Prayer. Anglicans may genuflect or cross themselves in the same way as Roman Catholics.

Other more traditional Anglicans tend to follow the 1662 Book of Common Prayer and retain the use of the King James Bible. This is typical in many Anglican cathedrals and particularly in royal peculiars such as the Savoy Chapel and the Queen's Chapel. These Anglican church services include classical music instead of songs, hymns from the New English Hymnal (usually excluding modern hymns such as "Lord of the Dance"), and are generally non-evangelical and formal in practice. Until the mid-20th century the main Sunday service was typically Morning Prayer, but the Eucharist has once again become the standard form of Sunday worship in most Anglican churches; this again is similar to Roman Catholic practice. Other common Sunday services include an early morning Eucharist without music, an abbreviated Eucharist following a service of morning prayer, and a service of Evening Prayer, often called "Evensong" when sung, usually celebrated between 3:00 and 6:00 pm. The late-evening service of Compline was revived in parish use in the early 20th century. Many Anglican churches will also have daily morning and evening prayer, and some have midweek or even daily celebration of the Eucharist.

An Anglican service (whether or not a Eucharist) will include readings from the Bible that are generally taken from a standardised lectionary, which provides for much of the Bible (and some passages from the Apocrypha) to be read out loud in the church over a cycle of one, two, or three years (depending on which eucharistic and office lectionaries are used, respectively). The sermon (or homily) is typically about ten to twenty minutes in length, often comparably short to sermons in evangelical churches. Even in the most informal Anglican services, it is common for set prayers such as the weekly Collect to be read. There are also set forms for intercessory prayer, though this is now more often extemporaneous. In high and Anglo-Catholic churches there are generally prayers for the dead. Although Anglican public worship is usually ordered according to the canonically approved services, in practice many Anglican churches use forms of service outside these norms. Liberal churches may use freely structured or experimental forms of worship, including patterns borrowed from ecumenical traditions such as those of the Taizé Community or the Iona Community.

Anglo-Catholic parishes might use the modern Roman Catholic liturgy of the Mass or more traditional forms, such as the Tridentine Mass (which is translated into English in the English Missal), the Anglican Missal, or, less commonly, the Sarum Rite. Catholic devotions such as the Rosary, Angelus, and Benediction of the Blessed Sacrament are also common among Anglo-Catholics.

==== Eucharistic discipline ====
Only baptised persons are eligible to receive communion, although in many churches communion is restricted to those who have not only been baptised but also confirmed. In many Anglican provinces, however, all baptised Christians are now often invited to receive communion and some dioceses have regularised a system for admitting baptised young people to communion before they are confirmed.

The discipline of fasting before communion is practised by some Anglicans. Most Anglican priests require the presence of at least one other person for the celebration of the Eucharist (referring back to Christ's statement in Matthew 18:20, "When two or more are gathered in my name, I will be in the midst of them."), though some Anglo-Catholic priests (like Roman Catholic priests) may say private Masses. As in the Roman Catholic Church, it is a canonical requirement to use fermented wine for communion.

Unlike in Roman Catholicism, the consecrated bread and wine are normally offered to the congregation at a eucharistic service ("communion in both kinds"). This practice is becoming more frequent in the Roman Catholic Church as well, especially through the Neocatechumenal Way. In some churches, the sacrament is reserved in a tabernacle or aumbry with a lighted candle or lamp nearby. In Anglican churches, only a priest or a bishop may be the celebrant at the Eucharist.

=== Daily office ===
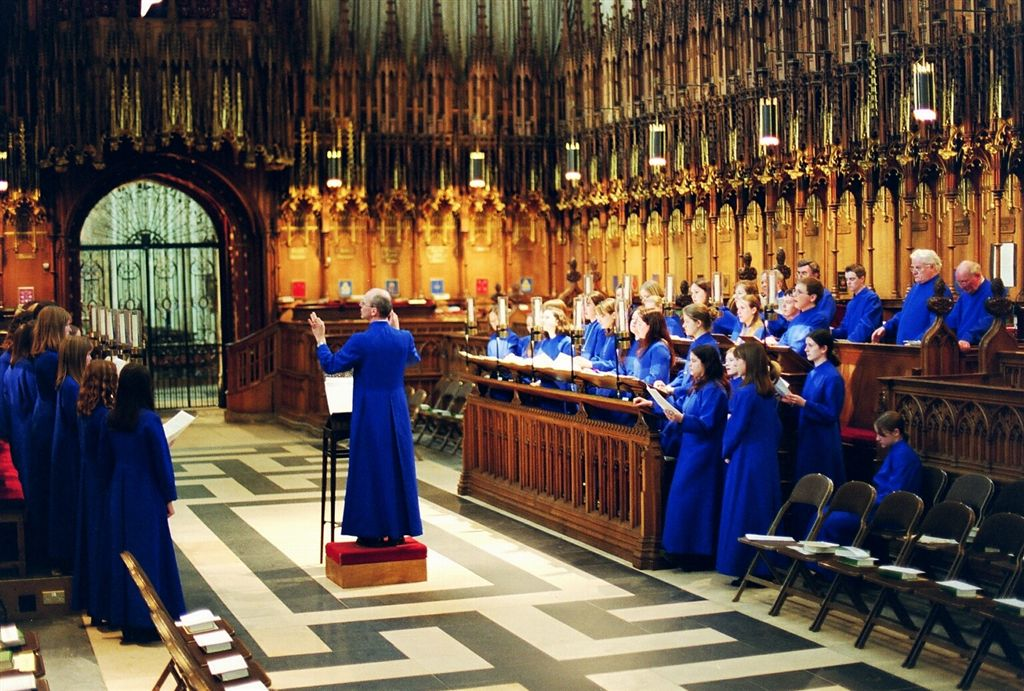
Evensong at York Minster in York, England

All Anglican prayer books contain offices for Morning Prayer and Evening Prayer (called Evensong when sung chorally). In the original Book of Common Prayer, these were derived from combinations of the ancient monastic offices of Matins and Lauds; and Vespers and Compline, respectively. The prayer offices have an important place in Anglican history.

Prior to the Catholic revival of the 19th century, which eventually restored the Eucharist as the principal Sunday liturgy, and especially during the 18th century, a morning service combining Matins, the Litany, and ante-Communion comprised the usual expression of common worship, while Matins and Evensong were sung daily in cathedrals and some collegiate chapels. This nurtured a tradition of distinctive Anglican chant applied to the canticles and psalms used at the offices (although plainsong is often used as well).

In some official and many unofficial Anglican service books, these offices are supplemented by other offices such as the Little Hours of Prime and prayer during the day such as (Terce, Sext, None, and Compline). Some Anglican monastic communities have a Daily Office based on that of the Book of Common Prayer but with additional antiphons and canticles, etc., for specific days of the week, specific psalms, etc. See, for example, Order of the Holy Cross and Order of St Helena, editors, A Monastic Breviary (Wilton, Conn.: Morehouse-Barlow, 1976). The All Saints Sisters of the Poor, with convents in Catonsville, Maryland, and elsewhere, use an elaborated version of the Anglican Daily Office. The Society of St. Francis publishes Celebrating Common Prayer, which has become especially popular for use among Anglicans.

In England, the United States, Canada, Australia, New Zealand, and some other Anglican provinces, the modern prayer books contain four offices:

- Morning Prayer, corresponding to Matins, Lauds and Prime;
- Prayer During the Day, roughly corresponding to the combination of Terce, Sext, and None (Noonday Prayer in the USA);
- Evening Prayer, corresponding to Vespers (and Compline);
- Compline.

In addition, most prayer books include a section of prayers and devotions for family use. In the US, these offices are further supplemented by an "Order of Worship for the Evening", a prelude to or an abbreviated form of Evensong, partly derived from Orthodox prayers. In the United Kingdom, the publication of Daily Prayer, the third volume of Common Worship, was published in 2005. It retains the services for Morning and Evening Prayer and Compline and includes a section entitled "Prayer during the Day". A New Zealand Prayer Book of 1989 provides different outlines for Matins and Evensong on each day of the week, as well as "Midday Prayer", "Night Prayer" and "Family Prayer".

Some Anglicans who pray the office on daily basis use the present Divine Office of the Roman Catholic Church. In many cities, especially in England, Anglican and Roman Catholic priests and lay people often meet several times a week to pray the office in common. A small but enthusiastic minority use the Anglican Breviary, or other translations and adaptations of the pre–Vatican II Roman Rite and Sarum Rite, along with supplemental material from cognate western sources, to provide such things as a common of Octaves, a common of Holy Women, and other additional material. Others may privately use idiosyncratic forms borrowed from a wide range of Christian traditions.

==== "Quires and Places where they sing" ====
In the late medieval period, many English cathedrals and monasteries had established small choirs of trained lay clerks and boy choristers to perform polyphonic settings of the Mass in their Lady chapels. Although these "Lady Masses" were discontinued at the Reformation, the associated musical tradition was maintained in the Elizabethan Settlement through the establishment of choral foundations for daily singing of the Divine Office by expanded choirs of men and boys. This resulted from an explicit addition by Elizabeth herself to the injunctions accompanying the 1559 Book of Common Prayer (that had itself made no mention of choral worship) by which existing choral foundations and choir schools were instructed to be continued, and their endowments secured. Consequently, some thirty-four cathedrals, collegiate churches, and royal chapels maintained paid establishments of lay singing men and choristers in the late 16th century.

All save four of these have – with interruptions during the Commonwealth and the COVID-19 pandemic – continued daily choral prayer and praise to this day. In the Offices of Morning Prayer and Evening Prayer in the 1662 Book of Common Prayer, these choral establishments are specified as "Quires and Places where they sing".

For nearly three centuries, this round of daily professional choral worship represented a tradition entirely distinct from that embodied in the intoning of Parish Clerks, and the singing of "west gallery choirs" which commonly accompanied weekly worship in English parish churches. In 1841, the rebuilt Leeds Parish Church established a surpliced choir to accompany parish services, drawing explicitly on the musical traditions of the ancient choral foundations. Over the next century, the Leeds example proved immensely popular and influential for choirs in cathedrals, parish churches, and schools throughout the Anglican communion. More or less extensively adapted, this choral tradition also became the direct inspiration for robed choirs leading congregational worship in a wide range of Christian denominations.

In 1719, the cathedral choirs of Gloucester, Hereford, and Worcester combined to establish the annual Three Choirs Festival, the precursor for the multitude of summer music festivals since. By the 20th century, the choral tradition had become for many the most accessible face of worldwide Anglicanism – especially as promoted through the regular broadcasting of choral evensong by the BBC; and also in the annual televising of the festival of Nine Lessons and Carols from King's College, Cambridge. Composers closely concerned with this tradition include Edward Elgar, Ralph Vaughan Williams, Gustav Holst, Charles Villiers Stanford, and Benjamin Britten. A number of important 20th-century works by non-Anglican composers were originally commissioned for the Anglican choral tradition – for example, the Chichester Psalms of Leonard Bernstein and the Nunc dimittis of Arvo Pärt.

=== Marriage ===
Most Anglican Churches in the world define marriage as between one man and one woman. The Global Fellowship of Confessing Anglicans (GAFCON) and the Global South Fellowship of Anglican Churches (GSFA), both involved in the Anglican realignment movement, have criticised those churches that have redefined marriage or offered blessings for same-sex unions.

Some Anglican Churches allow local churches to decide about blessings of same-sex marriage and same-sex unions. According to the BBC, some of the Anglican churches open to blessing same-sex couples "include Brazil, Canada, New Zealand, Scotland, South India, South Africa, the US and Wales." The Anglican Church of Australia allows individual dioceses to bless same-sex unions if they choose. Three dioceses of the Church of Ireland have voted to support blessing same-sex marriages. In 2023, the Church of England permitted priests to bless same-sex couples during regularly scheduled services. In 2023, the Anglican Church of Southern Africa's bishops resolved to draft prayers that could be said with same-sex couples. The drafted prayers were not approved for official use by the Provincial Synod; in 2024, after the Provincial Synod, Raphael Hess, the Bishop of the Diocese of Saldanha Bay gave permission for priests to bless same-sex couples in the diocese.

== Communion ==
=== Principles of governance ===
The British monarch is, in law, the Supreme Governor of the Church of England. He or she appoints its bishops, including the archbishop of Canterbury, by choosing a candidate from a short list presented by the church. This process is accomplished through collaboration with and consent of ecclesial representatives (see Ecclesiastical Commissioners). The British monarch also appoints the Lord High Commissioner to the General Assembly of the Church of Scotland. Although the monarch has no constitutional role in Anglican churches in other parts of the world, the prayer books of several countries where the monarch is head of state contain prayers for him or her as sovereign.

A characteristic of Anglicanism is that it has no international juridical authority. All forty-two provinces of the Anglican Communion are autonomous, each with their own primate and governing structure. These provinces may take the form of national churches (such as in Canada, Uganda or Japan) or a collection of nations (such as the West Indies, Central Africa or South Asia), or geographical regions (such as Vanuatu and Solomon Islands) etc. Within these provinces there may exist subdivisions, called ecclesiastical provinces, under the jurisdiction of a metropolitan archbishop.

All provinces of the Anglican Communion consist of dioceses, each under the jurisdiction of a bishop. In the Anglican tradition, bishops must be consecrated according to the strictures of apostolic succession, which Anglicans consider one of the marks of catholicity. Apart from bishops, there are two other orders of ordained ministry: deacon and priest.

No requirement is made for clerical celibacy, though many Anglo-Catholic priests have traditionally been bachelors. Because of innovations that occurred at various points after the latter half of the 20th century, women may be ordained as deacons in almost all provinces, as priests in most and as bishops in many. Anglican religious orders and communities, suppressed in England during the Reformation, have re-emerged, especially since the mid-19th century, and now have an international presence and influence.

Government in the Anglican Communion is synodical, consisting of three houses of laity (usually elected parish representatives), clergy and bishops. National, provincial and diocesan synods maintain different scopes of authority, depending on their canons and constitutions. Anglicanism is not congregational in its polity: it is the diocese, not the parish church, which is the smallest unit of authority in the church. (See Episcopal polity).

=== Archbishop of Canterbury ===
The coat of arms of the episcopal see of Canterbury

The archbishop of Canterbury has a precedence of honour over the other primates of the Anglican Communion, and for a province to be considered a part of the communion means specifically to be in full communion with the see of Canterbury – though this principle is currently subject to considerable debate, especially among those in the so-called Global South, including American Anglicans. The archbishop is, therefore, recognised as the primus inter pares (lat. "first amongst equals") even though no direct authority in any province outside of England is exercised by the archbishop. Rowan Williams, the archbishop of Canterbury from 2002 to 2012, was the first archbishop appointed from outside the Church of England since the Reformation as he was formerly the archbishop of Wales. On October 3, 2025, the monarch of the UK appointed Sarah Mullally as the archbishop of Canterbury making her the first woman to serve in the role and the first woman to be the "first among equals" and an "instrument of communion" within the Anglican Communion. On October 16, 2025, the Chair of GAFCON, Laurent Mbanda, the Primate of Rwanda, announced that GAFCON no longer recognises the Archbishop of Canterbury as an Instrument of Communion.

As spiritual head of the communion, the archbishop of Canterbury maintains a certain moral authority and has the right to determine which churches will be in communion with the see. The archbishop hosts and chairs both the Lambeth Conferences of Anglican Communion bishops and the Anglican Communion Primates' Meeting and is responsible for the invitations to them. The archbishop also acts as the president of the secretariat of the Anglican Communion Office and its deliberative body, the Anglican Consultative Council.

=== Conferences ===
The Anglican Communion has no international juridical organisation. All international bodies are consultative and collaborative, and their resolutions are not legally binding on the autonomous provinces of the communion. There are three international bodies of note.

- The Lambeth Conference is the oldest international consultation. It was first convened by Archbishop Charles Longley in 1867 as a vehicle for bishops of the communion to "discuss matters of practical interest, and pronounce what we deem expedient in resolutions which may serve as safe guides to future action". Since then, it has been held roughly every ten years. Invitation is by the archbishop of Canterbury.
- The Anglican Consultative Council was created by a 1968 Lambeth Conference resolution and meets biennially. The council consists of representative bishops, clergy and laity chosen by the forty-two provinces. The body has a permanent secretariat, the Anglican Communion Office, of which the archbishop of Canterbury is president.
- The Anglican Communion Primates' Meeting is the most recent manifestation of international consultation and deliberation, having been first convened by Archbishop Donald Coggan in 1978 as a forum for "leisurely thought, prayer and deep consultation".

=== Ordained ministry ===
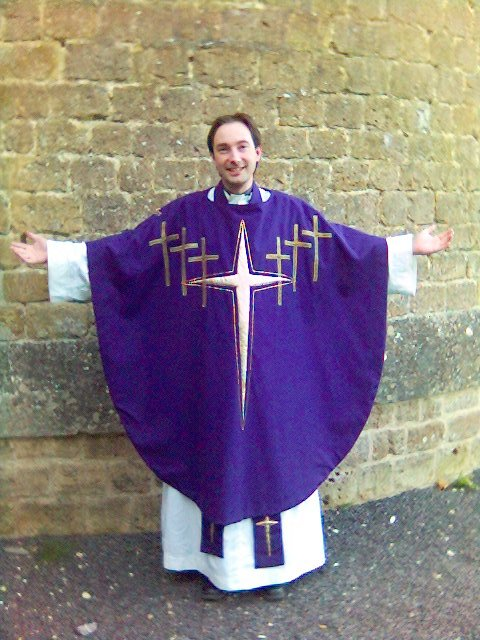
An Anglican priest in Eucharistic vestment

Like the Roman Catholic Church and the Orthodox churches, the Anglican Communion maintains the threefold ministry of deacons, presbyters (usually called "priests"), and bishops.

==== Episcopate ====
Bishops, who possess the fullness of Christian priesthood, are the successors of the apostles. Primates, archbishops, and metropolitans are all bishops and members of the historical episcopate who derive their authority through apostolic succession – an unbroken line of bishops that can be traced back to the 12 apostles of Jesus. The churches of the Anglican Communion have traditionally held that ordination in the historic episcopate is a core element in the validity of clerical ordinations. The Roman Catholic Church, however, does not recognise Anglican orders (see Apostolicae curae). Some Eastern Orthodox churches have issued statements to the effect that Anglican orders could be accepted, yet have still reordained former Anglican clergy; other Eastern Orthodox churches have rejected Anglican orders altogether. In 1922, the Ecumenical Patriarch of Constantinople, Meletius IV, followed by the Synod of Constantinople, issued a statement recognising Anglican Holy Orders within the Anglican Communion as valid through apostolic succession. Following Constantinople, five other autocephalous Orthodox jurisdictions recognised the validity of Anglican Holy Orders, including Alexandria, Jerusalem, Cyprus, Greece and Romania as well as the autonomous Church of Sinai. Orthodox bishop Kallistos Ware explains this apparent discrepancy as follows:

Anglican clergy who join the Orthodox Church are reordained; but [some Orthodox churches hold that] if Anglicanism and Orthodoxy were to reach full unity in the faith, perhaps such reordination might not be found necessary. It should be added, however, that a number of individual Orthodox theologians hold that under no circumstances would it be possible to recognise the validity of Anglican Orders.

==== Priesthood ====
Bishops are assisted by priests and deacons. Most ordained ministers in the Anglican Communion are priests, who usually work in parishes within a diocese. Priests are in charge of the spiritual life of parishes and are usually called the rector or vicar. A curate (or, more correctly, an "assistant curate") is a priest or deacon who assists the parish priest. Non-parochial priests may earn their living by any vocation, although employment by educational institutions or charitable organisations is most common. Priests also serve as chaplains of hospitals, schools, prisons, and in the armed forces.

An archdeacon is a priest or deacon responsible for administration of an archdeaconry, which is often the name given to the principal subdivisions of a diocese. An archdeacon represents the diocesan bishop in his or her archdeaconry. In the Church of England, the position of archdeacon can only be held by someone in priestly orders who has been ordained for at least six years. In some other parts of the Anglican Communion, the position can also be held by deacons. In parts of the Anglican Communion where women cannot be ordained as priests or bishops but can be ordained as deacons, the position of archdeacon is effectively the most senior office to which an ordained woman can be appointed.

A dean is a priest who is the principal cleric of a cathedral or other collegiate church and the head of the chapter of canons. If the cathedral or collegiate church has its own parish, the dean is usually also rector of the parish. However, in the Church of Ireland, the roles are often separated, and most cathedrals in the Church of England do not have associated parishes. In the Church in Wales, however, most cathedrals are parish churches and their deans are now also vicars of their parishes.

The Anglican Communion recognises Roman Catholic and Eastern Orthodox ordinations as valid. Outside the Anglican Communion, Anglican ordinations (at least of male priests) are recognised by the Old Catholic Church, Porvoo Communion Lutherans, and various Independent Catholic churches.

==== Diaconate ====
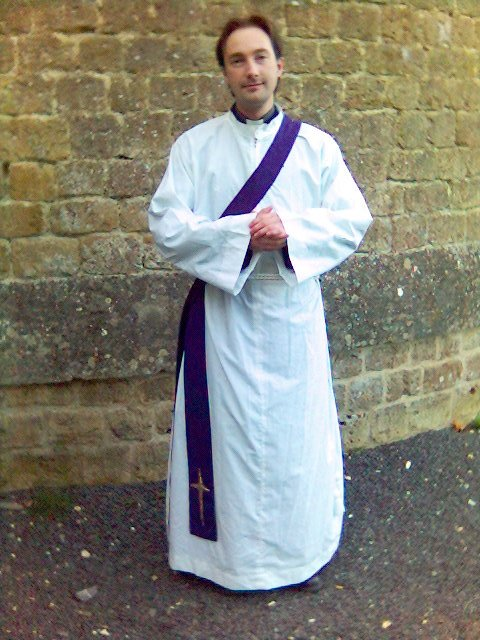
The vestments of a deacon, including a stole over the left shoulder

In Anglican churches, deacons often work directly in ministry to the marginalised inside and outside the church: the poor, the sick, the hungry, the imprisoned. Unlike Orthodox and most Roman Catholic deacons who may be married only before ordination, deacons are permitted to marry freely both before and after ordination, as are priests. Most deacons are preparing for priesthood and usually only remain as deacons for about a year before being ordained priests. However, there are some deacons who remain so.

Many provinces of the Anglican Communion ordain both men and women as deacons. Many of those provinces that ordain women to the priesthood previously allowed them to be ordained only to the diaconate. The effect of this was the creation of a large and overwhelmingly female diaconate for a time, as most men proceeded to be ordained priest after a short time as a deacon.

Deacons, in some dioceses, can be granted licences to solemnise matrimony, usually under the instruction of their parish priest and bishop. They sometimes officiate at Benediction of the Blessed Sacrament in churches which have this service. Deacons are not permitted to preside at the Eucharist (but can lead worship with the distribution of already consecrated communion where this is permitted), absolve sins, or pronounce a blessing. It is the prohibition against deacons pronouncing blessings that leads some to believe that deacons cannot solemnise matrimony.

=== Laity ===
All baptised members of the church are called Christian faithful, truly equal in dignity and in the work to build the church. Some non-ordained people also have a formal public ministry, often on a full-time and long-term basis – such as lay readers (also known as readers), churchwardens, vergers, and sextons. Other lay positions include acolytes (male or female, often children), lay eucharistic ministers (also known as chalice bearers), and lay eucharistic visitors (who deliver consecrated bread and wine to "shut-ins" or members of the parish who are unable to leave home or hospital to attend the Eucharist). Lay people also serve on the parish altar guild (preparing the altar and caring for its candles, linens, flowers, etc.), in the choir and as cantors, as ushers and greeters, and on the church council (called the "vestry" in some countries), which is the governing body of a parish.

=== Religious orders ===
A small yet influential aspect of Anglicanism is its religious orders and communities. Shortly after the beginning of the Catholic Revival in the Church of England, there was a renewal of interest in re-establishing religious and monastic orders and communities. One of Henry VIII's earliest acts was their dissolution and seizure of their assets. In 1841, Marian Rebecca Hughes became the first woman to take the vows of religion in communion with the Province of Canterbury since the Reformation.

In 1848, Priscilla Lydia Sellon became the superior of the Society of the Most Holy Trinity at Devonport, Plymouth, the first organised religious order. Sellon is called "the restorer, after three centuries, of the religious life in the Church of England". For the next one hundred years, religious orders for both men and women proliferated throughout the world, becoming a numerically small but disproportionately influential feature of global Anglicanism.

Anglican religious life at one time boasted hundreds of orders and communities, and thousands of religious. An important aspect of Anglican religious life is that most communities of both men and women lived their lives consecrated to God under the vows of poverty, chastity, and obedience, or, in Benedictine communities, Stability, Conversion of Life, and Obedience, by practising a mixed life of reciting the full eight services of the Breviary in choir, along with a daily Eucharist, plus service to the poor. The mixed life, combining aspects of the contemplative orders and the active orders, remains to this day a hallmark of Anglican religious life. Another distinctive feature of Anglican religious life is the existence of some mixed-gender communities.

Since the 1960s, there has been a sharp decline in the number of professed religious in most parts of the Anglican Communion, especially in North America, Europe, and Australia. Many once large and international communities have been reduced to a single convent or monastery with memberships of elderly men or women. In the last few decades of the 20th century, novices have for most communities been few and far between. Some orders and communities have already become extinct. There are, however, still thousands of Anglican religious working today in approximately 200 communities around the world, and religious life in many parts of the Communion – especially in developing nations – flourishes.

The most significant growth has been in the Melanesian countries of the Solomon Islands, Vanuatu, and Papua New Guinea. The Melanesian Brotherhood, founded at Tabalia, Guadalcanal, in 1925 by Ini Kopuria, is now the largest Anglican Community in the world, with over 450 brothers in the Solomon Islands, Vanuatu, Papua New Guinea, the Philippines, and the United Kingdom. The Sisters of the Church, started by Mother Emily Ayckbowm in England in 1870, has more sisters in the Solomons than all their other communities. The Community of the Sisters of Melanesia, started in 1980 by Sister Nesta Tiboe, is a growing community of women in the Solomon Islands.

The Society of Saint Francis, founded as a union of various Franciscan orders in the 1920s, has experienced great growth in the Solomon Islands. Other communities of religious have been started by Anglicans in Papua New Guinea and in Vanuatu. Most Melanesian Anglican religious are in their early to mid-20s. Vows may be temporary, and it is generally assumed that brothers, at least, will leave and marry in due course, making the average age 40 to 50 years younger than their brothers and sisters in other countries. Growth of religious orders, especially for women, is marked in certain parts of Africa.

=== Worldwide distribution ===
A world map showing the provinces of the Anglican Communion (blue). Shown are the Churches in full communion with the Anglican Church: The Nordic Lutheran churches of the Porvoo Communion (green), and the Old Catholic Churches in the Utrecht Union (red).

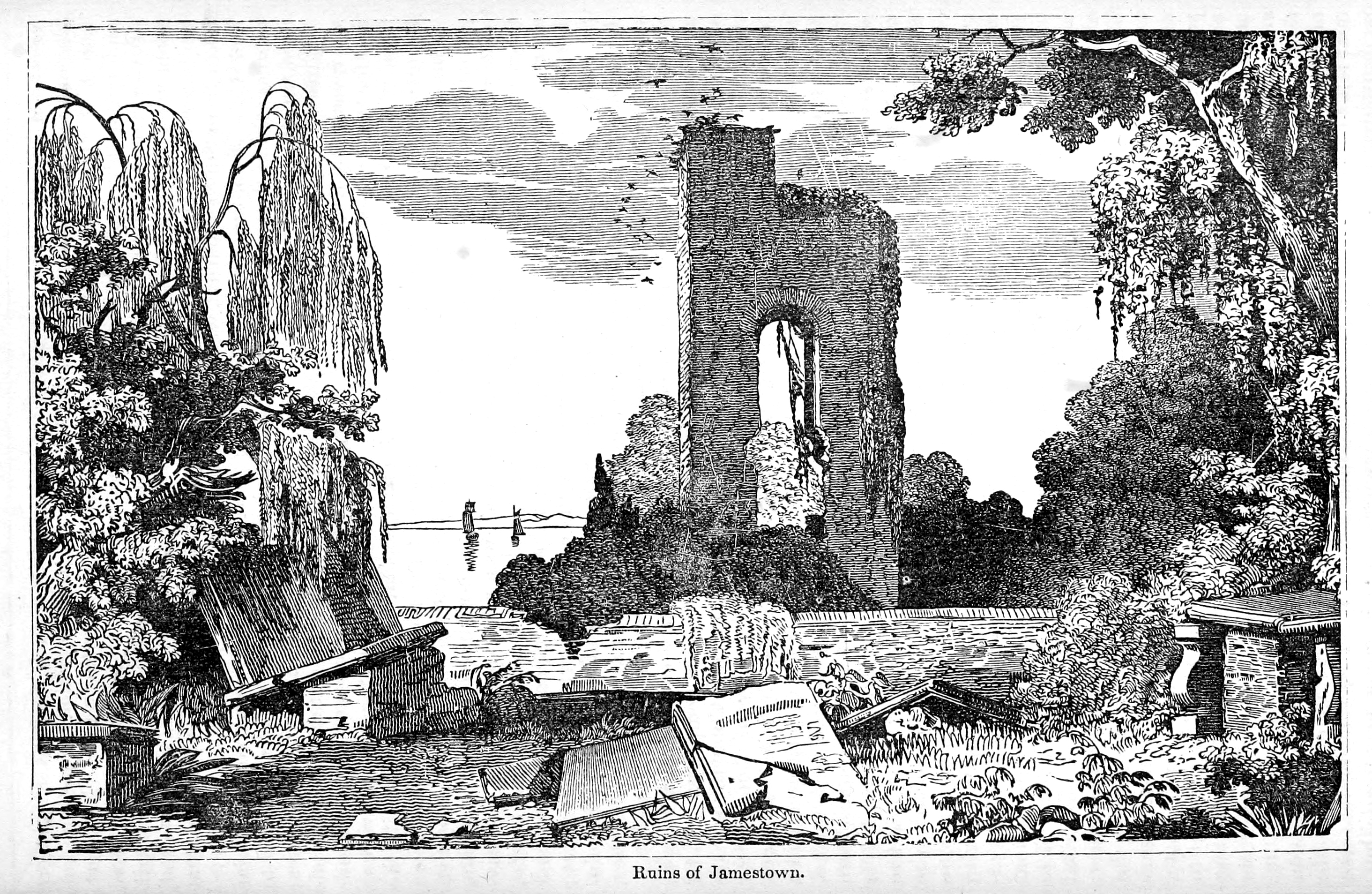
An 1854 image of the ruins of Jamestown Church in Jamestown, Virginia, the first Anglican church in North America

As of 2024, there are around 110 million Anglicans worldwide. Of these, as of 2020, around 95 million are members of the Anglican Communion (excluding united churches). This makes the Anglican Communion the third largest Christian communion in the world, after the Roman Catholic Church and the Eastern Orthodox Church.

The 11 provinces in Africa saw growth in the last two decades. The World Christian Database, published in 2021 and produced by the Center for the Study of Global Christianity at Gordon-Conwell Theological Seminary, and the World Christian Encyclopedia, published by Edinburgh University Press, estimated that the Anglican Communion had 97,399,000 members in 2020 with 63,556,000 in Africa, 24,400,000 in Europe, 4,565,000 in Oceania, 2,689,000 in Northern America, 1,230,000 in Asia, and 959,000 in Latin America (excluding the United churches). The ten largest member churches of the Anglican Communion, as measured by total reported membership not active membership, in 2025 were the churches based in England, Nigeria, Uganda, Kenya, Australia, South India, Southern Africa, South Sudan, Tanzania, and the Episcopal Church. In most industrialised countries, church attendance has decreased since the 19th century. Anglicanism's presence in the rest of the world is due to large-scale emigration, the establishment of expatriate communities, or the work of missionaries.

The Church of England has been a church of missionaries since the 17th century, when the Church first left English shores with colonists who founded what would become the United States, Australia, Canada, New Zealand, and South Africa, and established Anglican churches. For example, an Anglican chaplain, Robert Wolfall, with Martin Frobisher's Arctic expedition, celebrated the Eucharist in 1578 in Frobisher Bay.

The first Anglican church in the Americas was built at Jamestown, Virginia, in 1607. By the 18th century, missionaries worked to establish Anglican churches in Asia, Africa, and Latin America. The great Church of England missionary societies were founded; for example, the Society for Promoting Christian Knowledge (SPCK) in 1698, the Society for the Propagation of the Gospel in Foreign Parts (SPG) in 1701, and the Church Mission Society (CMS) in 1799. In the 19th century, social-oriented evangelism with societies were founded and developed, including the Church Pastoral Aid Society (CPAS) in 1836, Mission to Seafarers in 1856, Girls' Friendly Society (GFS) in 1875, Mothers' Union in 1876, and Church Army in 1882, all carrying out a personal form of evangelism.

In the 20th century, the Church of England developed new forms of evangelism, including the Alpha course in 1990, which was developed and propagated from Holy Trinity Brompton Church in London. In the 21st century, there has been renewed effort to reach children and youth. Fresh expressions is a Church of England missionary initiative to youth begun in 2005, and has ministries at a skate park through the efforts of St George's Church, Benfleet, Essex, the Diocese of Chelmsford, or youth groups with evocative names, like the C.L.A.W (Christ Little Angels – Whatever!) youth group at Coventry Cathedral. For those who prefer not to actually visit a brick and mortar church, there are Internet ministries, such as the Diocese of Oxford's online Anglican i-Church, which was founded on the web in 2005.

==== Ten largest Anglican populations (2020 statistics) ====
Country	Baptised Members	Year
United Kingdom	23,918,000	2020
Nigeria	21,604,000	2020
Uganda	16,297,000	2020
Kenya	8,288,000	2020
Tanzania	4,234,000	2020
South Africa	3,507,000	2020
Australia	3,491,000	2020
USA	2,042,000	2020
South Sudan	1,922,000	2020
Rwanda	1,557,000	2020

=== Ecumenism ===
Anglican interest in ecumenical dialogue can be traced back to the time of the Reformation and dialogues with both Orthodox and Lutheran churches in the 16th century. In the 19th century, with the rise of the Oxford Movement, there arose greater concern for reunion of the churches of "Catholic confession". This desire to work towards full communion with other denominations led to the development of the Chicago-Lambeth Quadrilateral, approved by the third Lambeth Conference of 1888. The four points (the sufficiency of scripture, the historic creeds, the two dominical sacraments, and the historic episcopate) were proposed as a basis for discussion, although they have frequently been taken as a non-negotiable bottom-line for any form of reunion.

=== Theological diversity ===
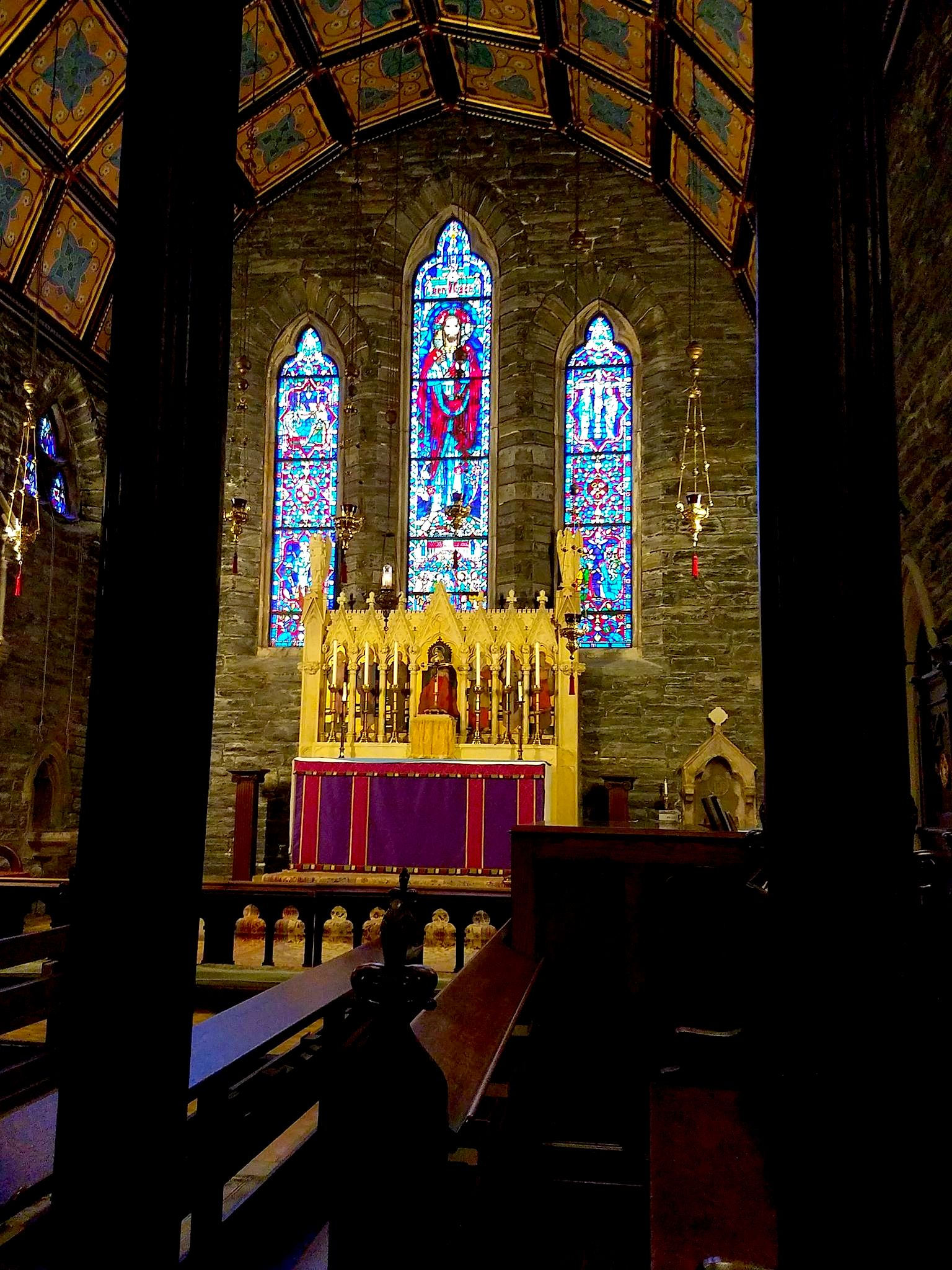
The high altar at the Anglo-Catholic Church of the Good Shepherd in Rosemont, Pennsylvania

Anglicanism in general has always sought a balance between the emphases of Catholicism and Protestantism, while tolerating a range of expressions of evangelicalism and ceremony. Clergy and laity from all Anglican churchmanship traditions have been active in the formation of the Continuing movement.

While there are high church, broad-church and low-church Continuing Anglicans, many Continuing churches are Anglo-Catholic with highly ceremonial liturgical practices. Others belong to a more evangelical or low-church tradition and tend to support the Thirty-nine Articles and simpler worship services. Morning Prayer, for instance, is often used instead of the Holy Eucharist for Sunday worship services, although this is not necessarily true of all low-church parishes.

Most Continuing churches in the United States reject the 1979 revision of the Book of Common Prayer by the Episcopal Church and use the 1928 version for their services instead. In addition, Anglo-Catholic bodies may use the Anglican Missal, Anglican Service Book or English Missal when celebrating Mass.

==== Internal conflict ====
A changing focus on social issues after the World War II led to Lambeth Conference resolutions countenancing contraception and the remarriage of divorced persons. Eventually, most provinces approved the ordination of women. In more recent years, some jurisdictions have permitted the ordination of people in same-sex relationships and authorised rites for the blessing of same-sex unions (see Homosexuality and Anglicanism). "The more liberal provinces that are open to changing Church doctrine on marriage in order to allow for same-sex unions include Brazil, Canada, New Zealand, Scotland, South India, South Africa, the US and Wales", while the more conservative provinces are primarily located in the Global South.

The lack of social consensus among and within provinces of diverse cultural traditions has resulted in considerable conflict and even schism concerning some or all of these developments, as was the case in the Anglican realignment. More conservative elements within and outside of Anglicanism (primarily African churches and factions within North American Anglicanism) have opposed these changes, while some liberal and moderate Anglicans see this opposition as representing a new fundamentalism within Anglicanism and "believe a split is inevitable and preferable to continued infighting and paralysis." Some Anglicans opposed to various liberalising changes, in particular the ordination of women, have become Roman Catholics or Orthodox. Others have, at various times, joined the Continuing Anglican movement or departed for non-Anglican evangelical churches.

== Continuum ==
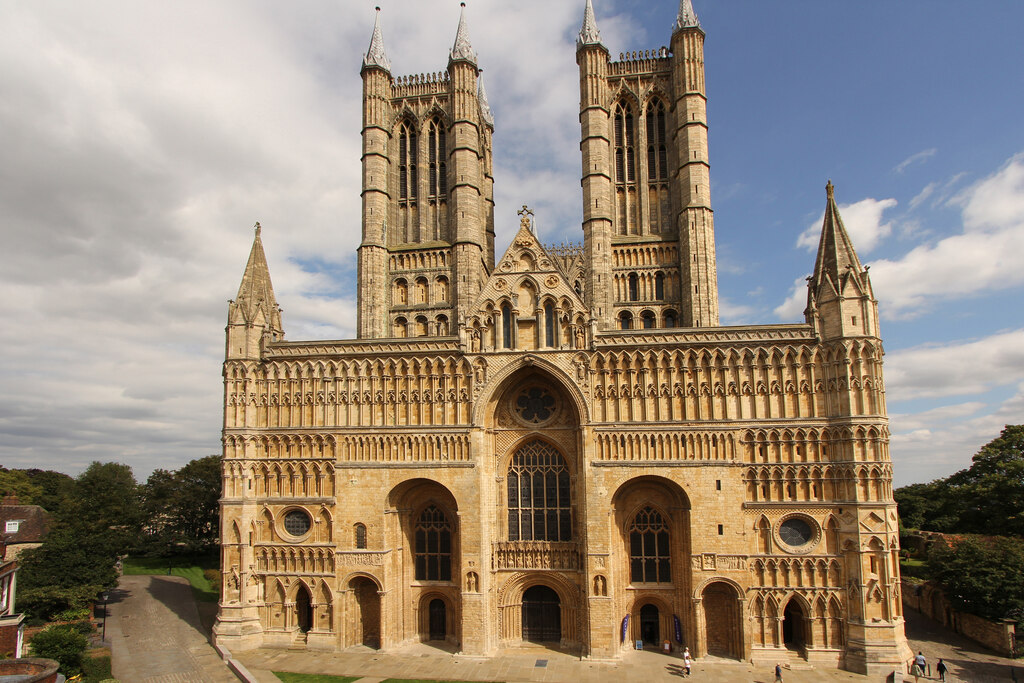
Lincoln Cathedral

The term "Continuing Anglicanism" refers to a number of church bodies which have formed outside of the Anglican Communion in the belief that traditional forms of Anglican faith, worship, and order have been unacceptably revised or abandoned within some Anglican Communion churches in recent decades. They therefore claim that they are "continuing" traditional Anglicanism.

The modern Continuing Anglican movement principally dates to the Congress of St. Louis, held in the United States in 1977, where participants rejected changes that had been made in the Episcopal Church's Book of Common Prayer and also the Episcopal Church's approval of the ordination of women to the priesthood. More recent changes in the North American churches of the Anglican Communion, such as the introduction of same-sex marriage rites and the ordination of gay and lesbian people to the priesthood and episcopate, have created further separations.

Continuing churches have generally been formed by people who have left the Anglican Communion. The original Anglican churches are charged by the Continuing Anglicans with being greatly compromised by secular cultural standards and liberal theology. Many Continuing Anglicans believe that the faith of some churches in communion with the archbishop of Canterbury has become unorthodox and therefore have not sought to also be in communion with him. The original continuing parishes in the United States were found mainly in metropolitan areas. Since the late 1990s, a number have appeared in smaller communities, often as a result of a division in the town's existing Episcopal churches. The 2007–08 Directory of Traditional Anglican and Episcopal Parishes, published by the Fellowship of Concerned Churchmen, contained information on over 900 parishes affiliated with either the Continuing Anglican churches or the Anglican realignment movement, a more recent wave of Anglicans withdrawing from the Anglican Communion's North American provinces.

== Social activism ==
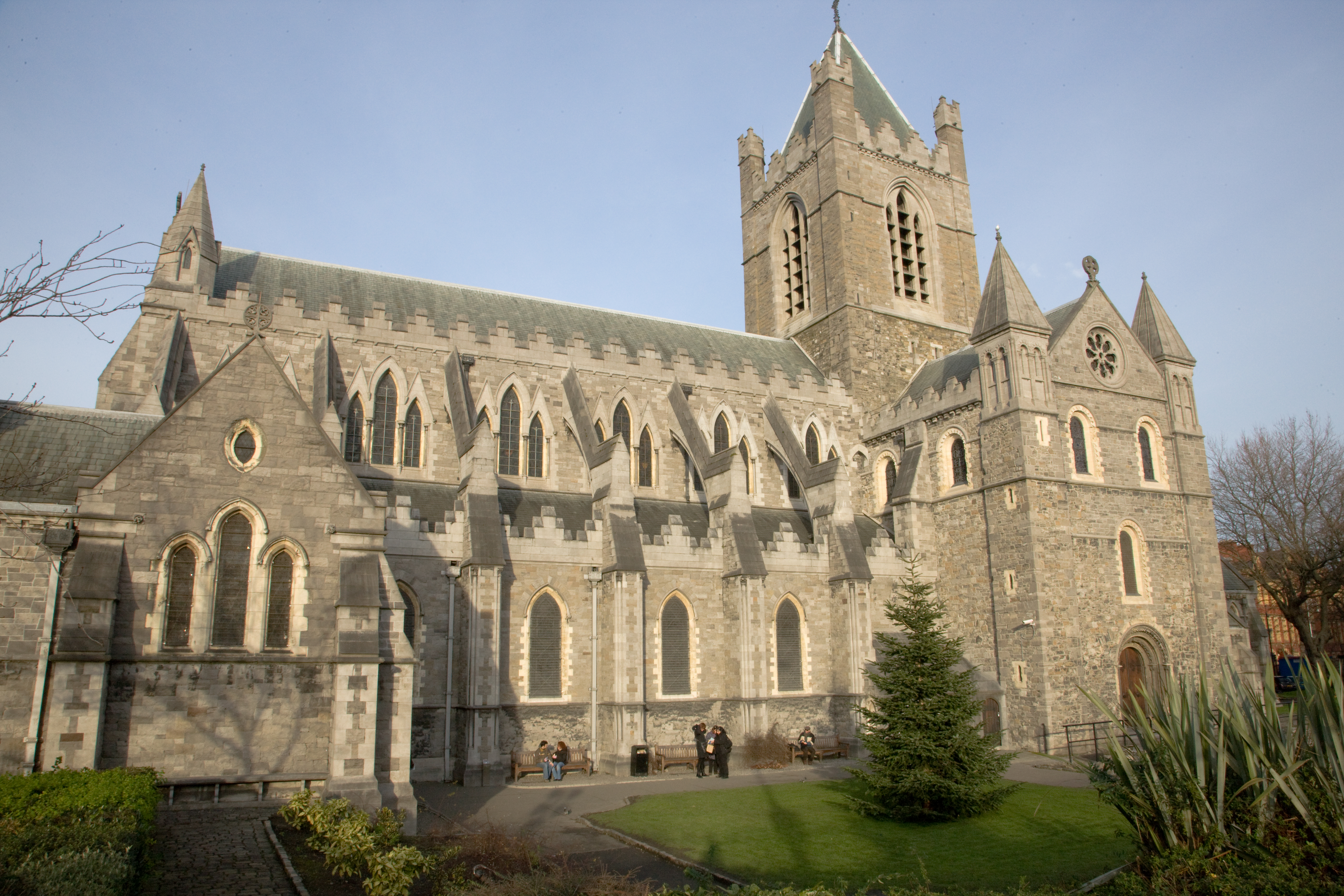
Christ Church Cathedral in Dublin, Ireland

A concern for social justice can be traced to very early Anglican beliefs, relating to an intertwined theology of God, nature, and humanity. The Anglican theologian Richard Hooker wrote in his book The Works of that Learned and Judicious Divine that "God hath created nothing simply for itself, but each thing in all things, and of every thing each part in other have such interest, that in the whole world nothing is found whereunto any thing created can say, 'I need thee not.'" Such statements demonstrate a theological Anglican interest in social activism, which has historically appeared in movements such as evangelical Anglican William Wilberforce's campaign against slavery in the 18th century, or 19th century issues concerning industrialisation.

=== Working conditions and Christian socialism ===
Lord Shaftesbury, a devout evangelical, campaigned to improve the conditions in factories, in mines, for chimney sweeps, and for the education of the very poor. For years, he was chairman of the Ragged School Board. Frederick Denison Maurice was a leading figure advocating reform, founding so-called "producer's co-operatives" and the Working Men's College. His work was instrumental in the establishment of the Christian socialist movement, although he himself was not in any real sense a socialist but "a Tory paternalist with the unusual desire to theorize his acceptance of the traditional obligation to help the poor", influenced Anglo-Catholics such as Charles Gore, who wrote that "the principle of the incarnation is denied unless the Christian spirit can be allowed to concern itself with everything that interests and touches human life." Anglican focus on labour issues culminated in the work of William Temple in the 1930s and 1940s."

=== Pacifism ===
A question of whether or not Christianity is a pacifist religion has remained a matter of debate for Anglicans. The leading Anglican spokesman for pacifist ideas, from 1914 to 1945, was Ernest Barnes, bishop of Birmingham from 1924 to 1953. He opposed both world wars. In 1937, the Anglican Pacifist Fellowship emerged as a distinct reform organisation, seeking to make pacifism a clearly defined part of Anglican theology. The group rapidly gained popularity amongst Anglican intellectuals, including Vera Brittain, Evelyn Underhill, and the former British political leader George Lansbury. Furthermore, Dick Sheppard, who during the 1930s was one of Britain's most famous Anglican priests due to his landmark sermon broadcasts for BBC Radio, founded the Peace Pledge Union, a secular pacifist organisation for the non-religious that gained considerable support throughout the 1930s.

Whilst never actively endorsed by Anglican churches, many Anglicans unofficially have adopted the Augustinian "Just War" doctrine. The Anglican Pacifist Fellowship remains highly active throughout the Anglican world. It rejects this doctrine of "just war" and seeks to reform the Church by reintroducing the pacifism inherent in the beliefs of many of the earliest Christians and present in their interpretation of Christ's Sermon on the Mount. The principles of the Anglican Pacifist Fellowship are often formulated as a statement of belief that "Jesus' teaching is incompatible with the waging of war ... that a Christian church should never support or justify war ... [and] that our Christian witness should include opposing the waging or justifying of war."

Confusing the matter was that the 37th Article of Religion in the Book of Common Prayer states that "it is lawful for Christian men, at the commandment of the Magistrate, to wear weapons, and serve in the wars." Therefore, the Lambeth Council in the modern era has sought to provide a clearer position by repudiating modern war and developed a statement that has been affirmed at each subsequent meeting of the council.

This statement was strongly reasserted when "the 67th General Convention of the Episcopal Church reaffirms the statement made by the Anglican Bishops assembled at Lambeth in 1978 and adopted by the 66th General Convention of the Episcopal Church in 1979, calling "Christian people everywhere ... to engage themselves in non-violent action for justice and peace and to support others so engaged, recognising that such action will be controversial and may be personally very costly... this General Convention, in obedience to this call, urges all members of this Church to support by prayer and by such other means as they deem appropriate, those who engaged in such non-violent action, and particularly those who suffer for conscience' sake as a result; and be it further Resolved, that this General Convention calls upon all members of this Church seriously to consider the implications for their own lives of this call to resist war and work for peace for their own lives."

=== Opposition to apartheid ===
The focus on other social issues became increasingly diffuse after World War II. The growing independence and strength of Anglican churches in the Global South brought new emphasis to issues of global poverty, the inequitable distribution of resources, and the lingering effects of colonialism. In this regard, figures such as Desmond Tutu and Ted Scott were instrumental in mobilising Anglicans worldwide against the apartheid policies of South Africa.

=== Abortion and euthanasia ===
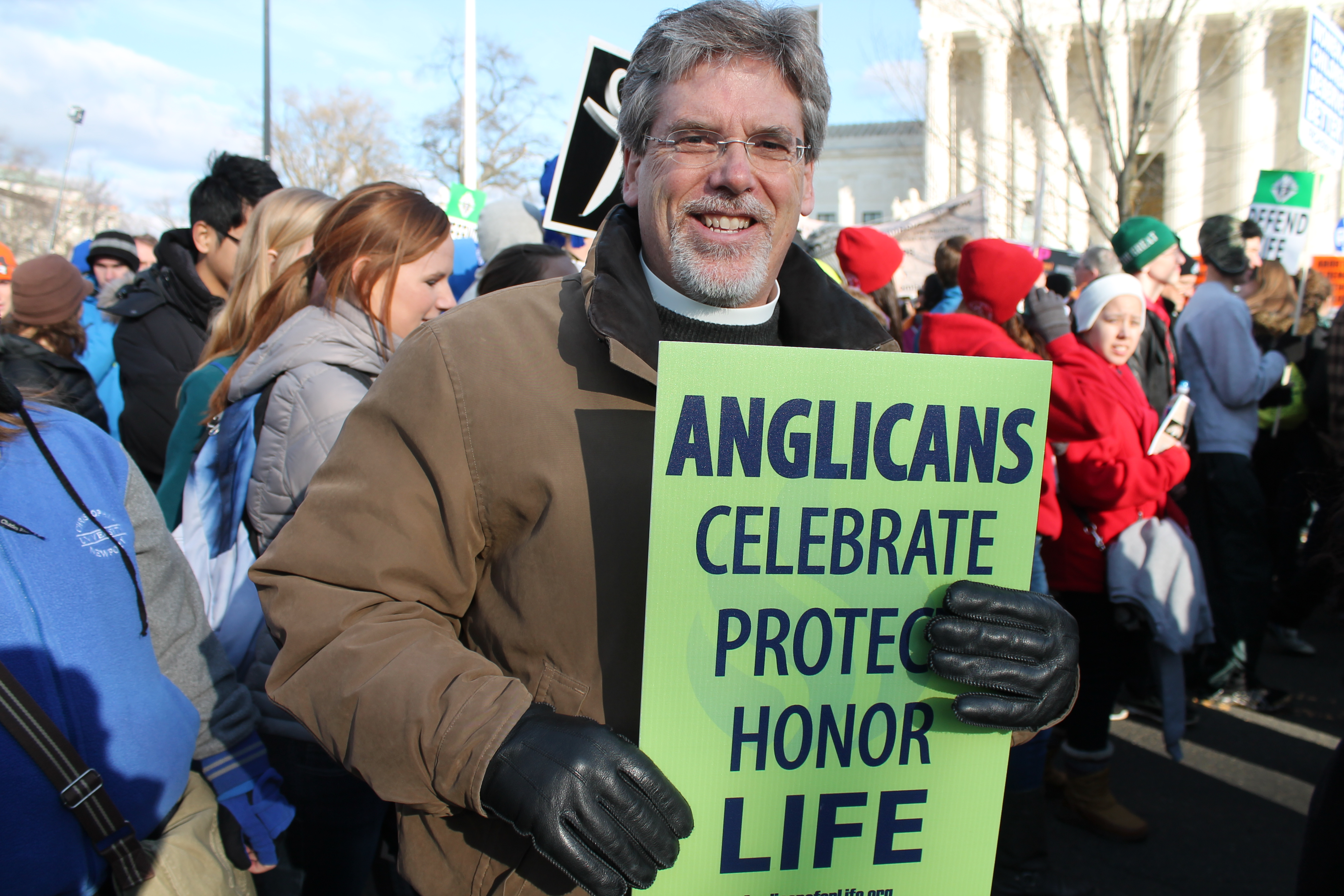
An Anglican clergyman marches with Anglicans for Life at the 2015 March for Life in Washington, D.C.

While individual Anglicans and member churches within the Communion differ in practice over the circumstances in which abortion should or should not be permitted, Lambeth Conference resolutions have consistently held to a conservative view on the issue. The 1930 Conference, the first to be held since the initial legalisation of abortion in Europe (in Russia in 1920), stated: "The Conference further records its abhorrence of the sinful practice of abortion."

The 1958 Conference's Family in Contemporary Society report affirmed the following position on abortion and was commended by the 1968 Conference:

In the strongest terms Christians reject the practice of induced abortion or infanticide, which involves the killing of a life already conceived (as well as a violation of the personality of the mother), save at the dictate of strict and undeniable medical necessity ... the sacredness of life is, in Christian eyes, an absolute which should not be violated.

The subsequent Lambeth Conference, in 1978, made no change to this position and commended the need for "programmes at diocesan level, involving both men and women ... to emphasise the sacredness of all human life, the moral issues inherent in clinical abortion, and the possible implications of genetic engineering."

In the context of debates around and proposals for the legalisation of euthanasia and assisted suicide, the 1998 Conference affirmed that "life is God-given and has intrinsic sanctity, significance and worth".

== Ordinariates within the Roman Catholic Church ==
On 4 November 2009, Pope Benedict XVI issued an apostolic constitution, Anglicanorum Coetibus, to allow groups of former Anglicans to enter into full communion with the Roman Catholic Church as members of personal ordinariates. 20 October 2009 announcement of the imminent constitution mentioned:

Today's announcement of the Apostolic Constitution is a response by Pope Benedict XVI to a number of requests over the past few years to the Holy See from groups of Anglicans who wish to enter into full visible communion with the Roman Catholic Church, and are willing to declare that they share a common Catholic faith and accept the Petrine ministry as willed by Christ for his Church.

Pope Benedict XVI approved, within the apostolic constitution, a canonical structure that provides for personal ordinariates which will allow former Anglicans to enter full communion with the Roman Catholic Church while preserving elements of distinctive Anglican spiritual patrimony.

For each personal ordinariate, the ordinary may be a former Anglican bishop or priest. It was expected that provision would be made to allow the retention of aspects of Anglican liturgy.

== Bibliography ==
- Armentrout, Don S.; Slocum, Robert Boak, eds. (2000). "Alban, St. (d. c. 304)". An Episcopal Dictionary of the Church. New York: Church Publishing. p. 6. ISBN 978-0-89869-701-8.
- Baker, Jonathan (1996). "Churchmanship". In Bunting, Ian (ed.). Celebrating the Anglican Way. London: Hodder & Stoughton. ISBN 978-0-340-64268-9.
- Bays, Patricia (2012). This Anglican Church of Ours. Kelowna, British Columbia: WoodLake. ISBN 978-1-77064-439-7.
- Black, Vicki K. (2005). Welcome to the Book of Common Prayer. Harrisburg, Pennsylvania: Morehouse Publishing. ISBN 978-0-8192-2130-8.
- Boenig, Robert (2000). Anglo-Saxon Spirituality. New York: Paulist Press. ISBN 978-0-8091-0515-1.
- Booty, John (1998). "Standard Divines". In Sykes, Stephen; Booty, John; Knight, Jonathan (eds.). The Study of Anglicanism. London: SPCK. pp. 176–187. ISBN 978-0-8006-3151-2.
- Brooke, Z. N. (1931). The English Church and the Papacy: From the Conquest to the Reign of John. Cambridge, England: Cambridge University Press.
- Cairns, Earle E. (2009). Christianity Through the Centuries: A History of the Christian Church (3rd ed.). Grand Rapids, Michigan: Zondervan. ISBN 978-0-310-82930-0.
- Campbell, Heather M., ed. (2011). The Ascent of the West: From Prehistory Through the Renaissance. A History of Western Civilization. New York: Britannica Educational Publishing. ISBN 978-1-61530-373-1.
- Carey, John (2006). "Christianity, Celtic". In Koch, John T. (ed.). Celtic Culture: A Historical Encyclopedia. Vol. 1. Santa Barbara, California: ABC-CLIO. pp. 431–435. ISBN 978-1-85109-440-0.
- Carpenter, Jane (2004). "Bertha, or Æthelbertha (fl. 567–601)". In Hartley, Cathy (ed.). A Historical Dictionary of British Women. London: Europa Publications. pp. 94–95. ISBN 978-0-203-40390-7.
- Chadwick, Owen (2010). The Victorian Church. Part Two: 1860–1901 (2nd ed.). Eugene, Oregon: Wipf and Stock. ISBN 978-1-60899-262-1.
- Cross, F. L.; Livingstone, E. A., eds. (2005). "Alban, St". The Oxford Dictionary of the Christian Church (rev. 3rd ed.). Oxford: Oxford University Press. p. 33. ISBN 978-0-19-280290-3.
- De Waal, Esther (1998). "Celtic Spirituality: A Contribution to the Worldwide Anglican Communion". In Wingate, Andrew; Ward, Kevin; Pemberton, Carrie; Sitshebo, Wilson (eds.). Anglicanism: A Global Communion. New York: Church Publishing. pp. 52–57. ISBN 978-0-89869-304-1.
- Edwards, David L. (1983). Christian England. Volume 2: From the Reformation to the 18th Century. London: Collins.
- —— (1984). Christian England. Volume 3: From the 18th Century to the First World War. London: Collins.
- Godfrey, John (2009) [1962]. The Church in Anglo-Saxon England. Cambridge, England: University of Cambridge Press. ISBN 978-0-521-05089-0.
- Grafton, C. C. (1911). The Lineage from Apostolic Times of the American Catholic Church, Commonly Called the Episcopal Church. Milwaukee, Wisconsin: Young Churchman.
- Hardinge, Leslie (1995). The Celtic Church in Britain. TEACH Services. ISBN 978-1-57258-034-3.
- Heaney, Robert S.; Sachs, William L. (2019). The Promise of Anglicanism. London: SCM Press. ISBN 978-0-334-05844-1.
- Hexham, Irving; Rost, Stephen; Morehead, John W. II, eds. (2004). Encountering New Religious Movements: A Holistic Evangelical Approach. Grand Rapids, Michigan: Kregel Publications. ISBN 978-0-8254-2893-7.
- Hogue, Richard (2010). A Theological History of Christian Glossolalia. Mustang, Oklahoma: Tate Publishing. ISBN 978-1-61566-674-4.
- Hunter Blair, Peter (1966). Roman Britain and Early England, 55 B.C. – A.D. 871. New York: W. W. Norton & Company. ISBN 978-0-393-00361-1.
- —— (2003). An Introduction to Anglo-Saxon England (3rd ed.). Cambridge, England: Cambridge University Press. ISBN 978-0-521-53777-3.
- Kaye, Bruce (1996). "Anglican Belief". In Bunting, Ian (ed.). Celebrating the Anglican Way. London: Hodder & Stoughton. ISBN 978-0-340-64268-9.
- Kelly, Joseph F. (2013). "Great Britain". In Ferguson, Everett (ed.). Encyclopedia of Early Christianity (2nd ed.). New York: Routledge. ISBN 978-1-136-61157-5.
- Kitson Clark, G. (1973). Churchmen and the Condition of England, 1832–1885: A Study in the Development of Social Ideas and Practice from the Old Regime to the Modern State. London: Methuen. ISBN 9780416132403.
- MacCulloch, Diarmaid (1990). The Later Reformation in England, 1547–1603. Basingstoke, England: MacMillan.
- —— (1996). Thomas Cranmer: A Life. New Haven, Connecticut: Yale University Press. ISBN 978-0-300-07448-2.
- Maltby, Judith (1998). Prayer Book and People in Elizabethan and Early Stuart England. Cambridge Studies in Early Modern British History. Cambridge, England: Cambridge University Press. ISBN 978-0-521-45313-4.
- May, Steven W. (2007). "'Tongue-tied our Queen?': Queen Elizabeth's Voice in the Seventeenth Century". In Hageman, Elizabeth H.; Conway, Katherine (eds.). Resurrecting Elizabeth I in Seventeenth-Century England. Madison, New Jersey: Fairleigh Dickinson University Press. ISBN 978-0-8386-4115-6.
- McAdoo, Henry Robert (1991). Anglican Heritage: Theology and Spirituality. Norwich, England: Canterbury Press.
- Miller, Duane Alexander (2011). "Anglicanorum Coetibus and the Church of Our Lady of the Atonement". Anglican and Episcopal History. 80 (3): 296–305. ISSN 0896-8039. JSTOR 42612608. Archived from the original on 12 August 2021.
- Morris, Jeremy N. (2003). "Newman and Maurice on the Via Media of the Anglican Church: Contrasts and Affinities". Anglican Theological Review. 85 (4): 623ff. ISSN 0003-3286.
- Moss, Claude Beaufort (2005) [1943]. The Christian Faith: An Introduction to Dogmatic Theology. Eugene, Oregon: Wipf and Stock. ISBN 978-1-59752-139-0.
- Mould, Alan (2007). The English Chorister: A History. London: Hambledon Continuum. ISBN 978-1-84725-058-2.
- Moyes, James (1907). "Anglicanism". In Herbermann, Charles (ed.). Catholic Encyclopedia. Vol. 1. New York: Robert Appleton Company. pp. 498–504 – via Wikisource.
- Nockles, Peter B. (1994). The Oxford Movement in Context: Anglican High Churchmanship, 1760–1857. Cambridge, England: Cambridge University Press. ISBN 978-0-521-38162-8.
- Norman, E. R. (1976). Church and Society in England, 1770–1970: A Historical Study. Oxford: Clarendon Press. ISBN 978-0-19-826435-4.
- Nunley, Jan (2005). "A Summary of the Report and Its Context". In Douglas, Ian T.; Zahl, Paul F. M. (eds.). Understanding the Windsor Report: Two Leaders in the American Church Speak Across the Divide. New York: Church Publishing. ISBN 978-0-89869-487-1.
- Parry, Graham (2008). Glory, Laud and Honour: The Arts of the Anglican Counter-Reformation. Woodbridge, England: Boydell Press. ISBN 978-1-84383-375-8.
- Percy, Martyn (2005). Engaging with Contemporary Culture: Christianity, Theology and the Concrete Church. Explorations in Practical, Pastoral, and Empirical Theology. Aldershot, England: Ashgate. ISBN 978-0-7546-8255-4.
- Ramsey, Michael (1936). The Gospel and the Catholic Church. London: Longmans.
- Russell, Thomas Arthur (2010). Comparative Christianity: A Student's Guide to a Religion and its Diverse Traditions. Boca Raton, Florida: Universal-Publishers. ISBN 978-1-59942-877-2.
- Scruton, Roger (1996). A Dictionary of Political Thought. Macmillan. ISBN 978-0-333-64786-8.
- Sydnor, William (1980). Looking at the Episcopal Church. Morehouse Publishing.
- Sykes, Stephen W. (1978). The Integrity of Anglicanism. London: Mowbray.
- Taylor, Thomas (1916). The Celtic Christianity of Cornwall. London: Longmans, Green and Co.
- Thomas, Charles (1981). Christianity in Roman Britain to AD 500. Berkeley, California: University of California Press. ISBN 978-0-520-04392-3.
- Timpson, T. (1847). British Ecclesiastical History, Including the Religion of the Druids, the Introduction of Christianity into Britain, and the Progress and Present State of Every Denomination of Christians in the British Empire (2nd ed.). London: Aylott and Jones.
- Tyacke, Nicholas (1987). Anti-Calvinists: The Rise of English Arminianism, c. 1590–1640. Oxford: Clarendon Press. ISBN 978-0-19-822939-1.
- Wallace, Martin (2009). The Celtic Resource Book (2nd ed.). London: Church House Publishing. ISBN 978-0-7151-4186-1.
- Webber, Christopher L. (1999). The Episcopal Church: An Introduction to Its History, Faith, and Worship. Harrisburg, Pennsylvania: Church Publishing. ISBN 978-0-8192-2520-7.
- Wilken, Robert Louis (2012). The First Thousand Years: A Global History of Christianity. New Haven, Connecticut: Yale University Press. ISBN 978-0-300-11884-1.
- Wright, J. Robert (2008). A Companion to Bede: A Reader's Commentary on The Ecclesiastical History of the English People. Grand Rapids, Michigan: Wm. B. Eerdmans Publishing. ISBN 978-0-8028-6309-6.
- Woodhouse-Hawkins, M. (1988). "Maurice, Huntington, and the Quadrilateral: An Exploration in Historical Theology". In Wright, J. Robert (ed.). Quadrilateral at One Hundred. London: Mowbray.
- Worsley, Howard (2015). "Anglican Church Christian Education". In Kurian, George Thomas; Lamport, Mark A. (eds.). Encyclopedia of Christian Education. Vol. 1. London: Rowman & Littlefield. p. 50. ISBN 978-0-8108-8493-9.
- Zimmer, Heinrich (1902). The Celtic Church in Britain and Ireland. Translated by Meyer, A. Ballantyne, Hanson & Co.
