= Wintringham (disambiguation) =

Wintringham is a housing development in St Neots, Cambridgeshire, England.

It may also refer to:

== Places ==
- Wintringham, North Yorkshire, a village in North Yorkshire, England.

== People ==
- Margaret Wintringham (1879–1955), British politician, wife of Thomas
- Michael Wintringham (born 1947), New Zealand public servant
- Thomas Wintringham (Liberal politician) (1867–1921), husband of Margaret
- Tom Wintringham (1898–1949), British soldier, politician and writer

=== Fictional ===
- Herman Wintringham (born 1974), lute player for the band The Weird Sisters in the fictional universe of Harry Potter

== Other ==
- Wintringham School, Academy in Grimsby, Lincolnshire, England, named after Tom
- HMS Wintringham, British minesweeper
- Wintringham Specialist Aged Care in Victoria, Australia

== See also ==
- Winteringham, a village in North Lincolnshire, England (similar pronunciation)
- Graham Winteringham (1923–2023), British architect (similar name)
