= Sherburn, North Yorkshire =

Village and civil parish in North Yorkshire, England

Coordinates: 54.179880°N 0.532360°W

Sherburn
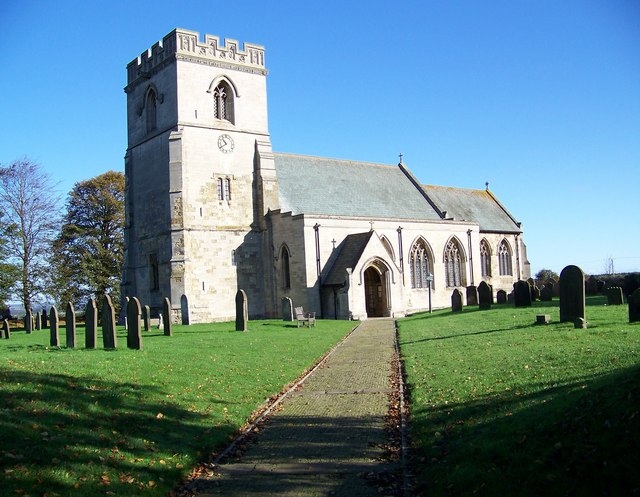
- St Hilda's Church, Sherburn

- Location within North Yorkshire
- Population: 830 (2011 census)
- OS grid reference: SE958770
- Civil parish: Sherburn
- Unitary authority: North Yorkshire
- Ceremonial county: North Yorkshire
- Region: Yorkshire and the Humber
- Country: England
- Sovereign state: United Kingdom
- Post town: MALTON
- Postcode district: YO17
- Police: North Yorkshire
- Fire: North Yorkshire
- Ambulance: Yorkshire
- UK Parliament: Thirsk and Malton

Sherburn is a village and civil parish in North Yorkshire, England. It is situated on the south side of the Vale of Pickering, immediately north of the Yorkshire Wolds. Sherburn lies 4 miles (6.4 km) north of Weaverthorpe, 3 miles (4.8 km) south of Brompton, 2 miles (3.2 km) east of East Heslerton and 2 miles (3.2 km) west of Ganton.

According to the 2011 Census. Sherburn parish had a population of 830. This was an increase on the population of 786 recorded in the 2001 UK census.

== History ==
In 2011 excavations to the east of the present village uncovered the remains of a large Anglo Saxon settlement. In 1086, Sherburn was listed in the Domesday Book as within the ancient wapentake of Toreshou. By the 13th century, Sherburn parish was within Buckrose wapentake. It was historically part of the East Riding of Yorkshire until 1974. From 1974 to 2023 it was part of the district of Ryedale, it is now administered by the unitary North Yorkshire Council.

St Hilda's Church, Sherburn is a Grade II* listed building and forms part of the Sykes Churches Trail. It was restored by C. Hodgson Fowler for Sir Tatton Sykes between 1909 and 1912. This included the addition of the tower. The Grade II listed village cross was given to the village by Sir Tatton Sykes in thanksgiving for the restoration for the church and was designed by Temple Moore. In October 2019 thieves stripped lead from the north side of the church roof.

During the Second World War Sherburn hosted a small prisoner of war camp. The buildings survived in a variety of agricultural uses until the early 21st century when they were replaced by the Vicarage Farm Close development.

== Amenities and leisure ==
The village is served by a Church of England Voluntary Controlled primary school run as a federation with another school located in West Lutton.

Sherburn has a village convenience store located on St Hilda's street which has been serving the communities for nearly a century.

Sherburn is home to a North Yorkshire Fire and Rescue Service Retained Fire Station.

The Yorkshire Wolds Way National Trail and the Centenary Way long-distance footpath runs just south of the village. Sustrans National Cycle Network Route 166 passes 3 miles (4.8 km) to the south east of Sherburn.

Sherburn Cricket Club field two teams in the Scarborough Beckett Cricket League.

== Transport ==
The A64 trunk road passes through the village. A regular Yorkshire Coastliner bus service providing connections to Scarborough, Malton, York and Leeds is operated by Transdev Blazefield.

Sherburn was served by Weaverthorpe railway station on the York-Scarborough line between 1845 and 1930.

== Economy ==
Local brothers Wilf and Frank Ward established a steelworks business (Ward Brothers), in the village, post the Second World War. The firm was a large employer in the Scarborough and Ryedale area. The Wards site now contains factories of Severfield and the Kingspan Group. The Kingspan factory also hosts a 5 MW solar array, one of the largest commercial rooftop solar projects in the UK.

== Governance ==
The parish council is Sherburn Parish Council.

An electoral ward in the same name exists. This ward stretches east to Staxton and west to East Heslerton and has a ward population taken at the 2011 Census of 1,980. Sherburn gave its name to a rural district in the East Riding of Yorkshire from 1894 to 1935, when the district was abolished and the village transferred to Norton Rural District. Sherburn was transferred from the East Riding to North Yorkshire on 1 April 1974, although its previous status is reflected by the name of the village's pub, the East Riding Hotel.

It was part of the Ryedale district between 1974 and 2023. It is now administered by North Yorkshire Council.

== Notable people ==
- James Cundall (born 1957), theatrical producer.

== See also ==
- Listed buildings in Sherburn, North Yorkshire
