= St Andrew's Church, East Heslerton =

Coordinates: 54.1773°N 0.5826°W

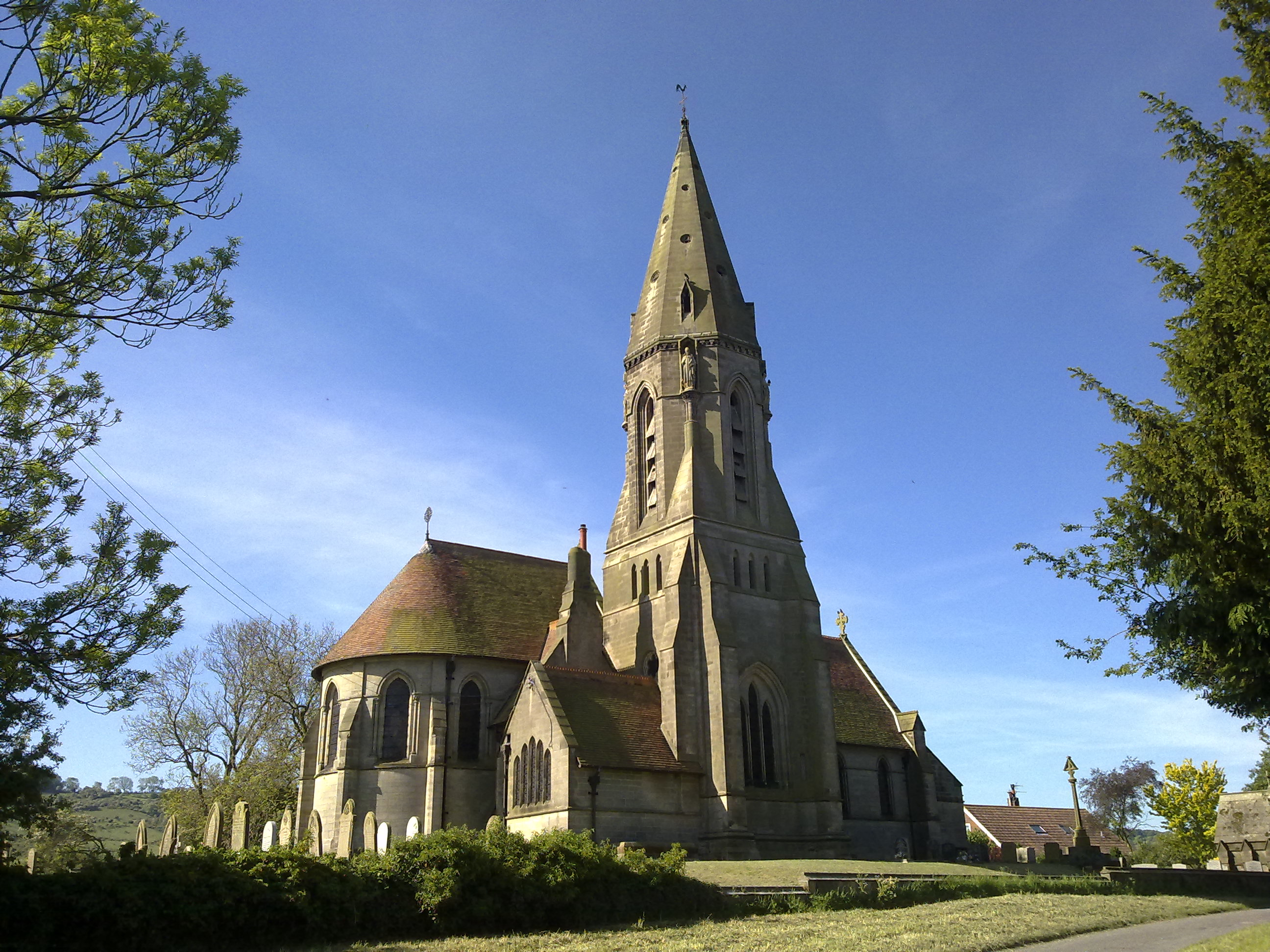
- St Andrew's Church, East Heslerton, from the northeast

- Location in North Yorkshire
- OS grid reference: SE 926 766
- Location: East Heslerton, North Yorkshire
- Country: England
- Denomination: Anglican
- Website: Churches Conservation Trust

History
- Founder: Sir Tatton Sykes
- Dedication: Saint Andrew

Architecture
- Functional status: Redundant
- Heritage designation: Grade I
- Designated: 10 October 1966
- Architect: G. E. Street
- Architectural type: Church
- Style: Gothic Revival
- Completed: 1877

Specifications
- Materials: Sandstone ashlar, red tile roof

St Andrew's Church is a redundant Anglican church at the south end of the village of East Heslerton, North Yorkshire, England. It is recorded in the National Heritage List for England as a designated Grade I listed building and is under the care of the Churches Conservation Trust.

== History ==
The present church is the third to be constructed on the site. It was built in 1877 by Sir Tatton Sykes of Sledmere House, and designed by the architect G. E. Street. It has not been changed since, and is "notable for being a complete survival of a Street design, without alteration and with fittings intact". The church was vested in the Trust on 8 October 2002.

== Architecture ==
=== Exterior ===
St Andrew's is constructed in sandstone ashlar. The spire is roofed in stone slates, and the rest of the church in red tiles. Its plan consists of a five-bay nave with a porch, a south baptistry projecting at the western end, a chancel at a higher level with a vestry to its north, and a north tower. The porch is open, forming a narthex, and is supported on grey stone columns with foliated capitals. The tower is in two stages with angle buttresses and has a stair turret on its northwest. The lower stage is square with a west door and three stepped lancet windows on the north side. The upper stage is octagonal and contains four louvred lancet bell openings, between which are statues under trefoil-headed canopies. The statues are representations of Saint Ambrose, Saint Augustine, Saint Gregory, and Saint Jerome, the four Latin Fathers, by James Redfern. They were originally intended for the north porch of Bristol Cathedral but the dean said they were papist and they were rescued by Street. The spire is also octagonal, and contains lucarnes and quatrefoil windows in roundels, with a wrought iron cross on its summit. It is 105 feet (32 m) high. The chancel has an apse and contains lancet windows; it also has a wrought iron cross on the summit of its roof. The vestry has an east window of five stepped lancets.

=== Interior ===
All the original fittings and furniture have survived intact. In the chancel are a double sedilia and two piscinae, all with trefoil heads. The font has an octagonal bowl standing on a pedestal of clustered columns. Its cover is decorated with wrought ironwork. The pulpit is in Caen stone and marble. The altarpiece is a painted polyptych depicting the Te Deum. Between the nave and chancel is a wrought iron screen with gates in the centre. The chancel is floored with encaustic tiles. All the stained glass is by Clayton and Bell. The window behind the organ depicts the Creation, and the west window the Nativity. The pews are in oak, and the floor of the nave is boarded in oak. There is a ring of three bells, which were cast in 1876–77 by John Taylor & Co of Loughborough.

== External features ==
In and around the churchyard are three items, all dating from 1877, and all listed at Grade II. The lychgate and the wall, which completely encircles the churchyard, were designed by Street, and both are constructed in sandstone ashlar. Over the lychgate is a gabled roof, with a cross on its north end. In the churchyard is a cross, also designed by Street and in sandstone ashlar. It is circular in plan and consists of a fluted shaft on a base of three steps, carrying a foliated cross under a crocketed, gabled canopy. Also in the churchyard is a wrought iron lamppost and lamp, both of which are elaborately decorated. Although the church is under the care of the Trust, these three items are still owned by the parish.

== See also ==
- Grade I listed buildings in North Yorkshire (district)
- Listed buildings in Heslerton
- List of churches preserved by the Churches Conservation Trust in Northern England
