= Centenary Way =

84-mile footpath in North Yorkshire, England

Centenary Way, North Yorkshire
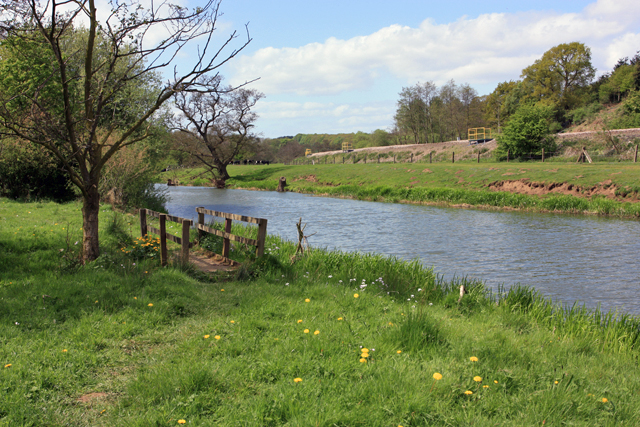
- Section along the River Derwent
- Length: 83 mi (134 km)
- Location: North Yorkshire, England
- Designation: UK National Trail
- Trailheads: York Minster, North Yorkshire; 53.962°N 1.082°W and Filey, North Yorkshire; 54.210°N 0.292°W
- Use: Hiking
- Season: All year

The Centenary Way is a route devised to celebrate the 100th anniversary of North Yorkshire County Council. It was opened by Chris Brasher in 1989 to mark the Centenary of the governance by County Councils.

The route runs across the Howardian Hills and Yorkshire Wolds via Castle Howard and Wharram Percy, linking York and the Foss Walk with the Yorkshire Wolds Way and Cleveland Way National Trails.

Meeting the Derwent and Foss, the walk combines riverside walks in deep valleys with forest tracks. Part of the route overlaps with the Yorkshire Wolds Way which also ends at Filey along with the Cleveland Way.

Start: SE603522 – York, North Yorkshire
Finish: TA126817 – Filey Brigg, North Yorkshire
Waymark: Letters CW on standard waymarks

== Places along the Centenary Way ==
The route of the Centenary Way passes close to or through the following places:

- York Minster
- Huntington
- New Earswick
- Strensall
- West Lilling
- Sheriff Hutton
- Terrington
- Slingsby
- Coneysthorpe
- Castle Howard
- Welburn
- Low Hutton
- Malton
- Norton
- Settrington
- North Grimston
- Birdsall
- Thixendale
- Wharram Percy
- Wintringham
- West Heslerton
- Sherburn
- Potter Brompton
- Ganton
- Hunmanby
- Filey

Places in italics are slightly off the main route.

== Pictures ==
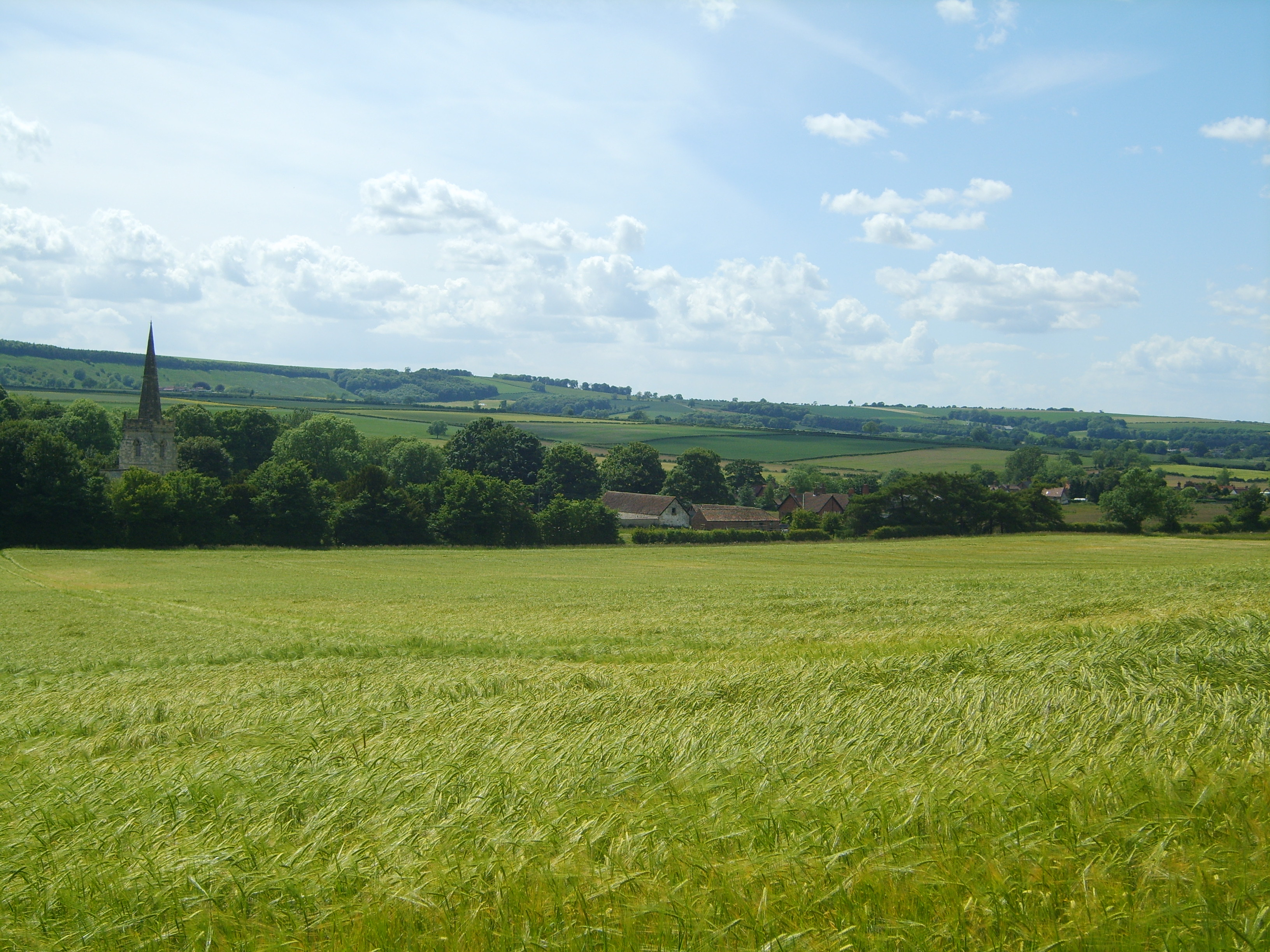
Near Wintringham

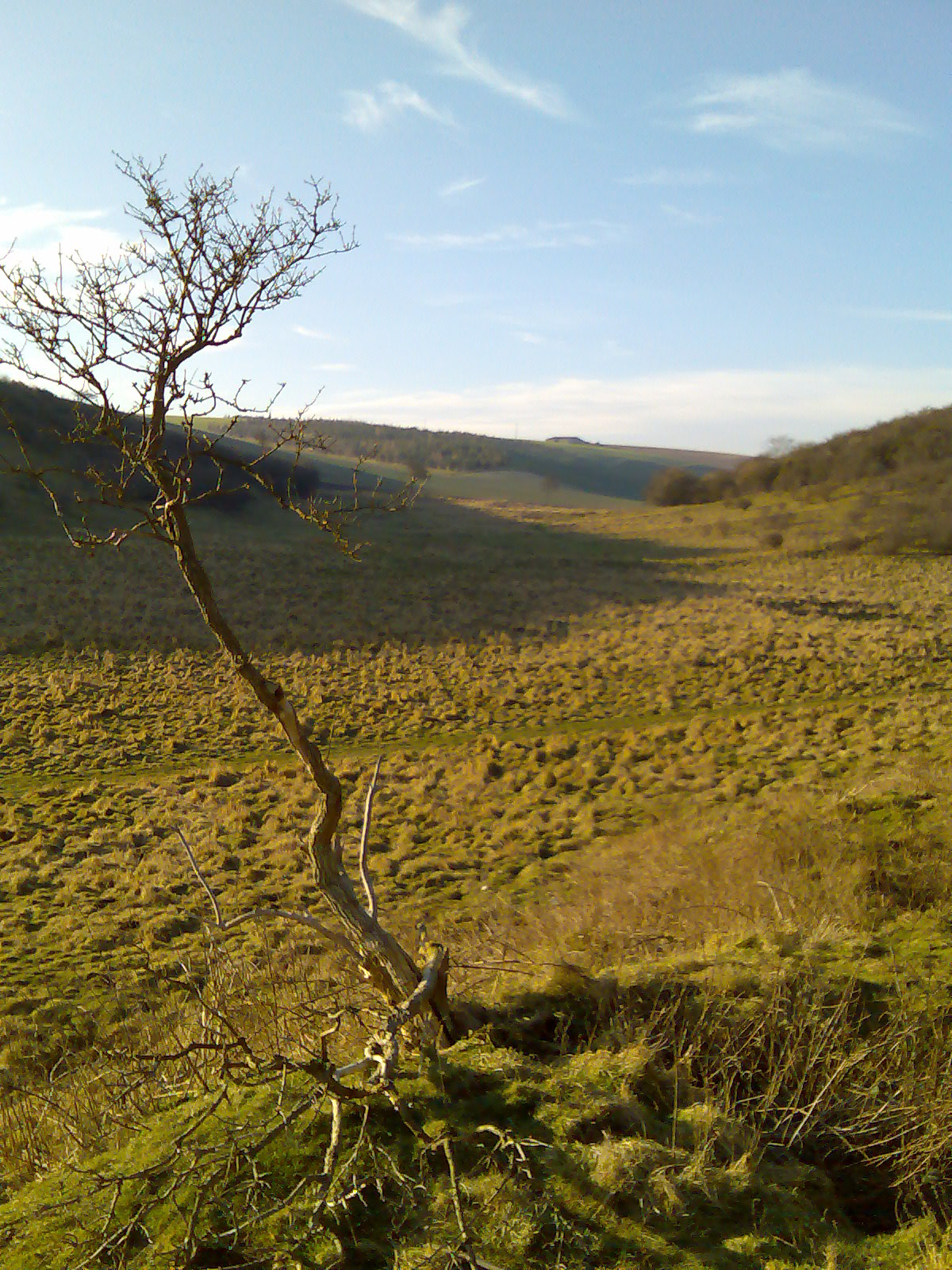
Near Hunmanby

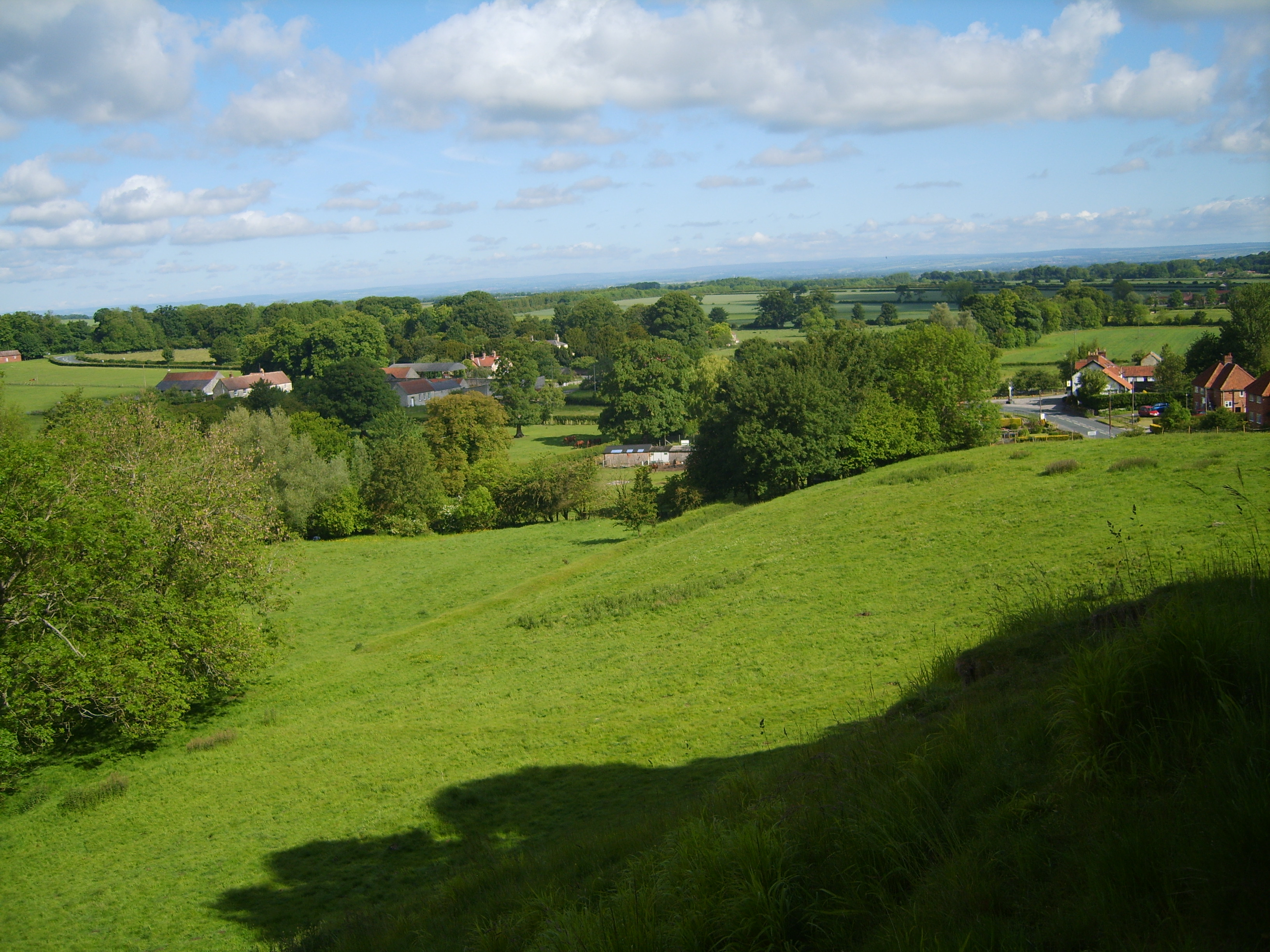
Near North Grimston

== See also ==
- Long-distance footpaths in the UK
