= West Heslerton =

Village in North Yorkshire, England

Coordinates: 54°10′17″N 0°36′21″W

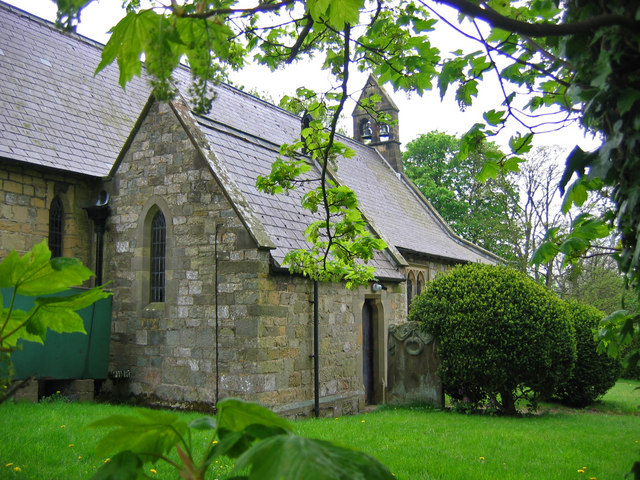
- All Saints' Church, West Heslerton

- Location within North Yorkshire
- Population: 409 (2011 census)
- OS grid reference: SE911759
- Civil parish: Heslerton
- Unitary authority: North Yorkshire
- Ceremonial county: North Yorkshire
- Region: Yorkshire and the Humber
- Country: England
- Sovereign state: United Kingdom
- Post town: MALTON
- Postcode district: YO17
- Police: North Yorkshire
- Fire: North Yorkshire
- Ambulance: Yorkshire
- UK Parliament: Thirsk and Malton

West Heslerton is a village and former civil parish, now in the parish of Heslerton, in North Yorkshire, England, 6 miles (10 km) southeast of Pickering. In 1931 the parish had a population of 308. The village was named on early maps as Heslerton Magna.

The village lies within the historic county boundaries of the East Riding of Yorkshire. It was part of the Ryedale district between 1974 and 2023. It is now administered by North Yorkshire Council.

== Etymology ==
The village name is thought to be derived from the Old English words hæsel ('hazel'), or a derivative thereof, and the word tūn ('enclosure'). Thus it once meant "hazel enclosure".

== History ==
The village is the site of one of Britain's largest archaeological excavations, that of a large settlement which seems to have been occupied for several centuries until about 800 AD. The settlement flourished during late Roman/early Anglo-Saxon times, but may have been occupied for a considerable length of time before the arrival of Romans in Britain. The site covers over 110 acres (45 hectares) and contains the traces of more than 200 buildings. Excavations of Cook's Quarry in the village, unearthed a cemetery containing 250 skeletons of people buried between the 4th and 7th centuries AD.

In 1866 West Heslerton became a civil parish, on 1 April 1935 the parish was abolished and merged with East Heslerton to form "Heslerton".

The civil parish of Heslerton had 409 residents at the 2001 census, with the population remaining unchanged at the 2011 census.

The Yorkshire Wolds Way National Trail and the Centenary Way long distance footpaths run just south of the village.

Heslerton Cricket Club play in West Heslerton and field two teams in the Scarborough Cricket League.

== Ownership ==
The entire village was owned by the same family for over 150 years, until 2016, when the land and property remaining in Estate ownership was put up for sale for £20 million following the death of its last owner, Eve Dawnay, in 2010. Miss Dawnay was a great-granddaughter of William Henry Dawnay, 7th Viscount Downe and of Lt.-Col. Arthur de Vere Capell, Viscount Malden, son of the 6th Earl of Essex.

The estate was purchased by Albanwise, a Norfolk-based land and property investment company which is ultimately owned by the Vighignolo Investment Trust (a not-for-profit organization), Albanwise has ever since then invested to preserve the village historic heritage and maintain the surrounding landscape

== Transport ==
The A64 trunk road passes through the village. A regular Yorkshire Coastliner bus service providing connections to Scarborough, Malton, York and Leeds is operated by Transdev Blazefield.

West Heslerton was served by Heslerton railway station on the York to Scarborough Line between 1845 and 1930.

== Notable people ==
- John Henry Hutton

== See also ==
- Listed buildings in Heslerton
