= Nicholas Wrigley =

British banker and businessman

- Born: Nicholas Hugh Tremayne Wrigley; 22 March 1955 (age 71)
- Education: Harrow School
- Occupation: Merchant banker
- Known for: 30 year career at N M Rothschild & Sons
- Title: Former chairman, Persimmon plc
- Board member of: N M Rothschild & Sons (until 2008)
- Spouse: married
- Children: 3

Nicholas Hugh Tremayne Wrigley (born 22 March 1955) is a British merchant banker and businessman, and the former chairman of Persimmon plc.

== Early life ==
Wrigley was born on 22 March 1955, and educated at Harrow School. He is a chartered accountant.

== Career ==
Wrigley was a non-executive director at the merchant bank N M Rothschild & Sons until November 2008, and had a thirty years career with the bank, rising to managing director of investment banking.

From 2009 to June 2014, Wrigley was senior steward (effectively chairman) of the Jockey Club, succeeding Julian Richmond-Watson. After serving a five-year term, he was succeeded by Roger Weatherby.

In December 2017, Wrigley resigned as chairman of Persimmon plc over his role in awarding Jeff Fairburn, the CEO, a £128 million bonus. The Persimmon bonus scheme is believed to be the UK's "most generous ever", and is scheduled to pay more than £800m to 150 senior staff from 31 December 2016.

== Personal life ==
Wrigley is married to Venetia, they live in Ganton Hall in Ganton, North Yorkshire, and have two daughters and one son.
