= East Heslerton =

Village in North Yorkshire, England

Coordinates: 54.177920°N 0.582934°W

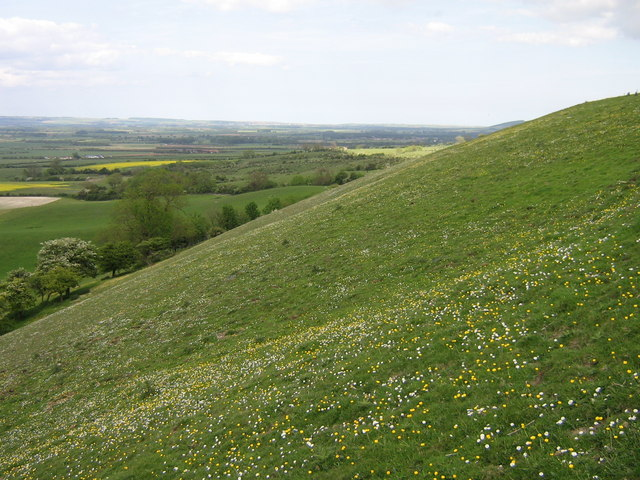
- On East Heslerton Wold, looking towards the Vale of Pickering

- Location within North Yorkshire
- OS grid reference: SE925767
- Civil parish: Heslerton
- Unitary authority: North Yorkshire
- Ceremonial county: North Yorkshire
- Region: Yorkshire and the Humber
- Country: England
- Sovereign state: United Kingdom
- Post town: MALTON
- Postcode district: YO17
- Police: North Yorkshire
- Fire: North Yorkshire
- Ambulance: Yorkshire
- UK Parliament: Thirsk and Malton

East Heslerton is a village in the civil parish of Heslerton, near Malton, in North Yorkshire, England. It lies between the villages of West Heslerton and Sherburn, at the interface between the Vale of Pickering to the north and the Yorkshire Wolds to the south. Heslerton had a population of 409 at the 2011 census. The village was named on early maps as Heslerton Parva.

The Yorkshire Wolds Way and Centenary Way pass approximately one mile to the south of the village.

== History ==
A Neolithic barrow group lies on East Heslerton Brow at the top of the Wold escarpment.

There is a deserted village at Manor Farm near East Heslerton which is open to the public all year. Visitors can see the remains set in ridge and furrow fields.

The name Heslerton derives from the Old English hæslingtūn meaning 'settlement growing with hazel trees'.

From 1918 to 1939 East Heslerton Aerodrome was used by the Royal Air Force and civilian pilots. It was located to the east of the village and commemorated by a plaque on the East Heslerton Church Rooms.

Until 1974 the village lay in the historic county boundaries of the East Riding of Yorkshire. From 1974 to 2023 it was part of the district of Ryedale, it is now administered by the unitary North Yorkshire Council.

In 1866 East Heslerton became a civil parish, on 1 April 1935 the parish was abolished and merged with West Heslerton to form "Heslerton". In 1931 the parish had a population of 152.

== The church of Saint Andrew ==
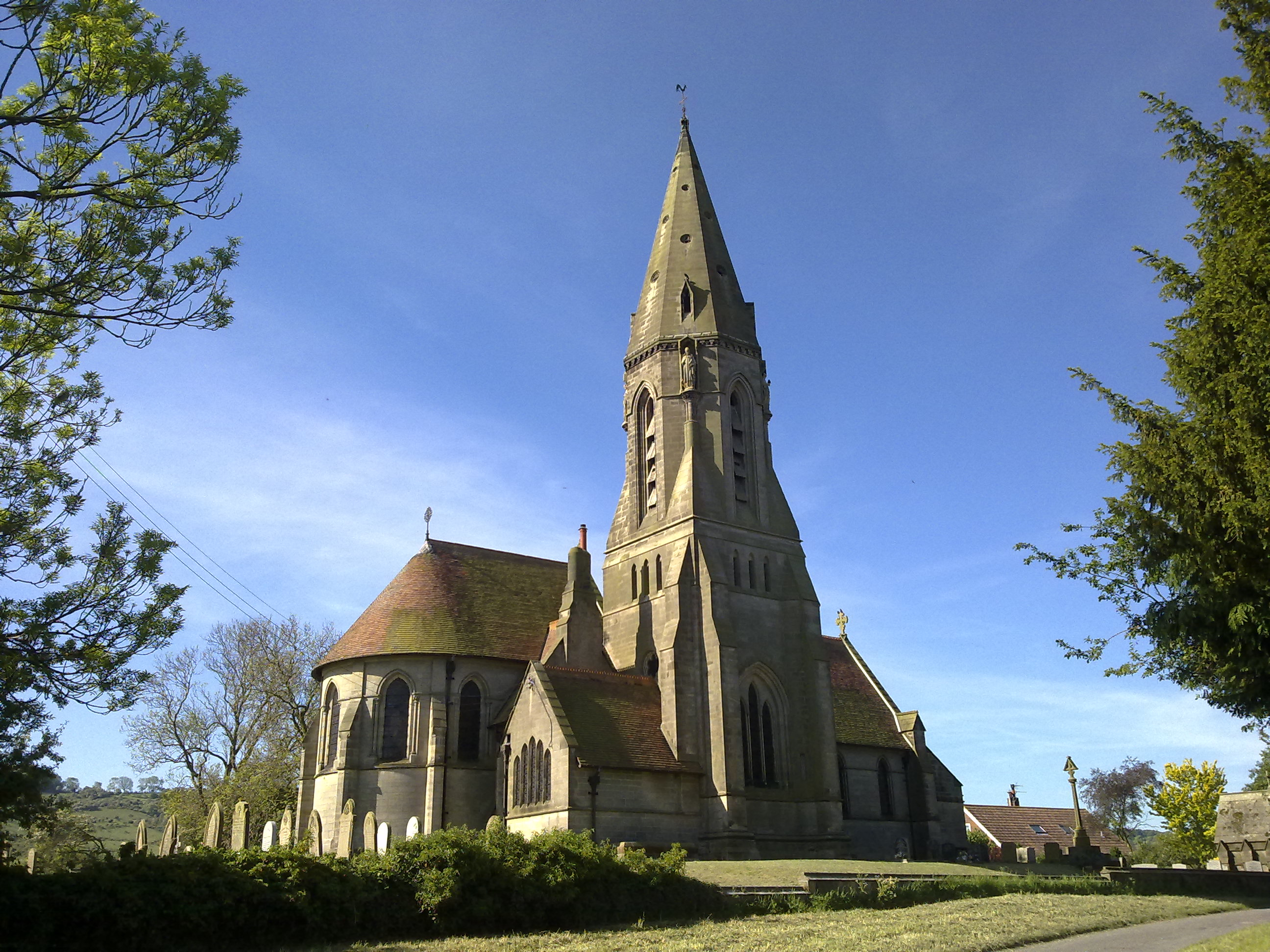
St Andrew's Church

The church was designed by George Edmund Street commissioned by Sir Tatton Sykes of Sledmere House. Work started in 1873 and St Andrew's was completed in 1877. It has sculptures of the four saintly fathers of the Latin Church, St Augustine, St Ambrose, St Gregory and St Jerome, all modelled by James Redfern. They were originally intended for the northern porch of Bristol Cathedral but were thought too "papist" by the Dean and rejected. They were rescued by Street.

The church is now redundant and the Grade I listed building is cared for by the Churches Conservation Trust.

== Transport ==
The A64 trunk road passes through the village. A regular Yorkshire Coastliner bus service providing connections to Scarborough, Malton, York and Leeds is operated by Transdev Blazefield.

East Heslerton was served by Heslerton railway station on the York to Scarborough Line between 1845 and 1930.

== See also ==
- Listed buildings in Heslerton
