= Listed buildings in Heslerton =

Heslerton is a civil parish in the county of North Yorkshire, England. It contains twelve listed buildings that are recorded in the National Heritage List for England. Of these, one is listed at Grade I, the highest of the three grades, and the others are at Grade II, the lowest grade. The parish contains the villages of East Heslerton and West Heslerton and the surrounding area. The listed buildings consist of two churches and associated structures, houses, a dovecote and a milestone.

== Key ==
Grade	Criteria
I	Buildings of exceptional interest, sometimes considered to be internationally important
II	Buildings of national importance and special interest

== Buildings ==
Name and location	Photograph	Date	Notes	Grade
All Saints' Church, West Heslerton; 54.17035°N 0.60543°W		13th century	The church has been altered and extended through the centuries, and it was restored in 1886–88 by C. Hodgson Fowler. It is built in sandstone with slate roofs, and consists of a nave, a north aisle, a chancel and a vestry. On the west gable is a bellcote.	II
Dovecote, Heslerton Hall; 54.17069°N 0.60772°W	—	Mid to late 18th century	The dovecote is in red and vitreous brick, with a sandstone band, a floor band, a dentilled eaves course, a red and blue pyramidal pantile roof with a sandstone ridge, and a timber domed glover with a lead cap. There is one storey and a loft, and one bay. It contains a segmental-arched doorway, a blocked roundel, a circular window, and two tiers of dove holes.	II
Manor House Farmhouse; 54.17202°N 0.60660°W	—	Late 18th century	The house was extended in the 19th century. It is in mottled brick, rendered at the rear, with a dentilled eaves course, and a pantile roof. There are two storeys, the original house has two bays, and the extension has three. The windows are sashes, the doorway has a divided fanlight, and most of the openings have wedge lintels and keystones.	II
Coach house and wall, Old Rectory; 54.17194°N 0.60331°W	—	Late 18th century	The former coach house is in mottled brick,, with sandstone dressings, and a pantile roof with coped gables and shaped kneelers. There are two storeys and two bays, and the gable wall has a pediment containing a recessed roundel. On the front is a rebated segmental coach arch with imposts and a keystone, and double doors, and above are casement windows with segmental arches. The wall is in chalk stone with brick facing and flat sandstone coping. It is about 3 metres (9.8 ft) high, and contains a rebated segmental arch and diamond-shaped open brickwork insets.	II
Old Rectory; 54.17186°N 0.60369°W	—	1818	The rectory, later a private house, is in pink brick, with sandstone dressings, a triglyph eaves band, and hipped slate roofs with ironwork scrolls at the corners. There are two storeys and three bays. On the front is a porch, the windows are sashes, and all the openings have wedge lintels.	II
Milestone; 54.17865°N 0.57075°W		Early 19th century (probable)	The milestone on the north side of the A64 road is in sandstone. It is partly sunk into the ground, and the inscription is illegible.	II
Roseville; 54.17824°N 0.58467°W	—	Early 19th century	The house is in mottled red brick, and has a pantile roof with coped gables and shaped kneelers. There are two storeys, four bays, and a single-storey rear outshut with a catslide roof. Steps lead up to a doorway in the third bay with a patterned fanlight, and above it is a blocked window opening. The windows are sashes, and all the openings have painted wedge lintels.	II
Wold Cottage; 54.17115°N 0.60394°W	—	Early 19th century	The house is in mottled brick, with boxed eaves and a pyramidal pantile roof. There are two storeys and two bays. The doorway has pilasters, a radial fanlight and a cornice, and to the left is a round-arched passage doorway. The windows are sashes with painted wedge lintels.	II
St Andrew's Church, East Heslerton; 54.17733°N 0.58264°W		1877	The church, which was designed by G. E. Street, is built in sandstone with tile roofs. It consists of a nave with a west narthex porch, a south baptistry, a chancel with an apse, a north vestry, and a north steeple. The steeple has a square tower with two stages, a chamfered moulded plinth, angle buttresses, a northwest stair turret, a pointed west door, and stepped lancet windows, above which is a band of lancets. The bell stage is octagonal, and between the bell openings are four statues. The tower is surmounted by an octagonal spire over a corbel table, and contains lucarnes and quatrefoils. The narthex is open and has two columns of polished stone with foliate capitals.	I
Churchyard cross 54.17736°N 0.58288°W		1877	The cross in the churchyard of St Andrew's Church, East Heslerton, to the north of the church, was designed by G. E. Street. It is in sandstone with a circular plan, and consists of a fluted stem on a moulded base and drum, on three steps. On the top is a foliated cross under a crocketed gabled canopy.	II
Lamp and lamp standard 54.17725°N 0.58290°W		c. 1877 (probable)	The lamp and lamp standard are in the churchyard of St Andrew's Church, East Heslerton, to the west of the church. They are in wrought iron and have a square plan. The standard and the square lamp are in openwork, and are enriched with leafy scrolls, arabesques, pendants and twists.	II
Lychgate and churchyard wall 54.17736°N 0.58304°W		1877	The lychgate at the entrance to the churchyard of St Andrew's Church, East Heslerton was designed by G. E. Street. It is in sandstone with a stone flag roof, and contains an arch with a hood mould, and a gable with a cross. On the sides are gableted buttresses. The wall encloses the churchyard, and is low and buttressed, on a chamfered plinth, with moulded coping.	II
