= Ganton Hall =

Manor house in Ganton, North Yorkshire, England

Coordinates: 54.1798°N 0.4816°W

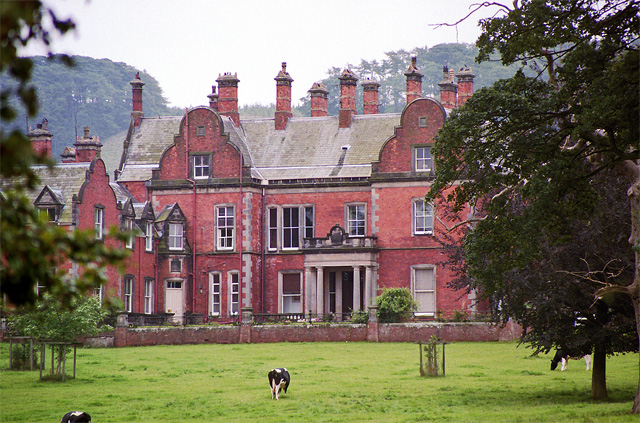
The building, in 2002

Ganton Hall is a historic building in Ganton, a village in North Yorkshire, in England.

The manor house was purchased by John Legard in 1586, at which time it was described as "new builded, the walls of chalk-stone and covered with slate". The current country house was built slightly further south between 1866 and 1868, and the old house was demolished in 1870. In 1910, the house was sold to the Wrigley family. In the late 20th and early 21st century, it was the home of Phillida Wrigley and her husband, and more recently the owner has been Nicholas Wrigley. The house was grade II listed in 1992.

The house is built of red brick on a chamfered plinth, with stone dressings, quoins, a narrow floor band, a moulded eaves band, and slate roofs with shaped gables. The windows throughout are sashes. There are two storeys and attics, and an H-shaped plan, and a lower service wing with one storey and an attic. The southeast front has five bays, a recessed centre flanked by two-storey canted bay window, and gabled dormers. The southwest front has three bays and contains a canted and a square two-storey bay window. The northwest entrance front has five irregular bays, and contains a porch with coupled Doric columns, an entablature, and a plain parapet. Inside, there is fine coving, a grand wooden staircase, and marble fireplaces, while the laundry has its original stove and drying shelves.

== See also ==
- Listed buildings in Ganton
