= St Hilda's Church, Sherburn =

Church in Sherburn, North Yorkshire, England

Coordinates: 54.1837°N 0.5313°W

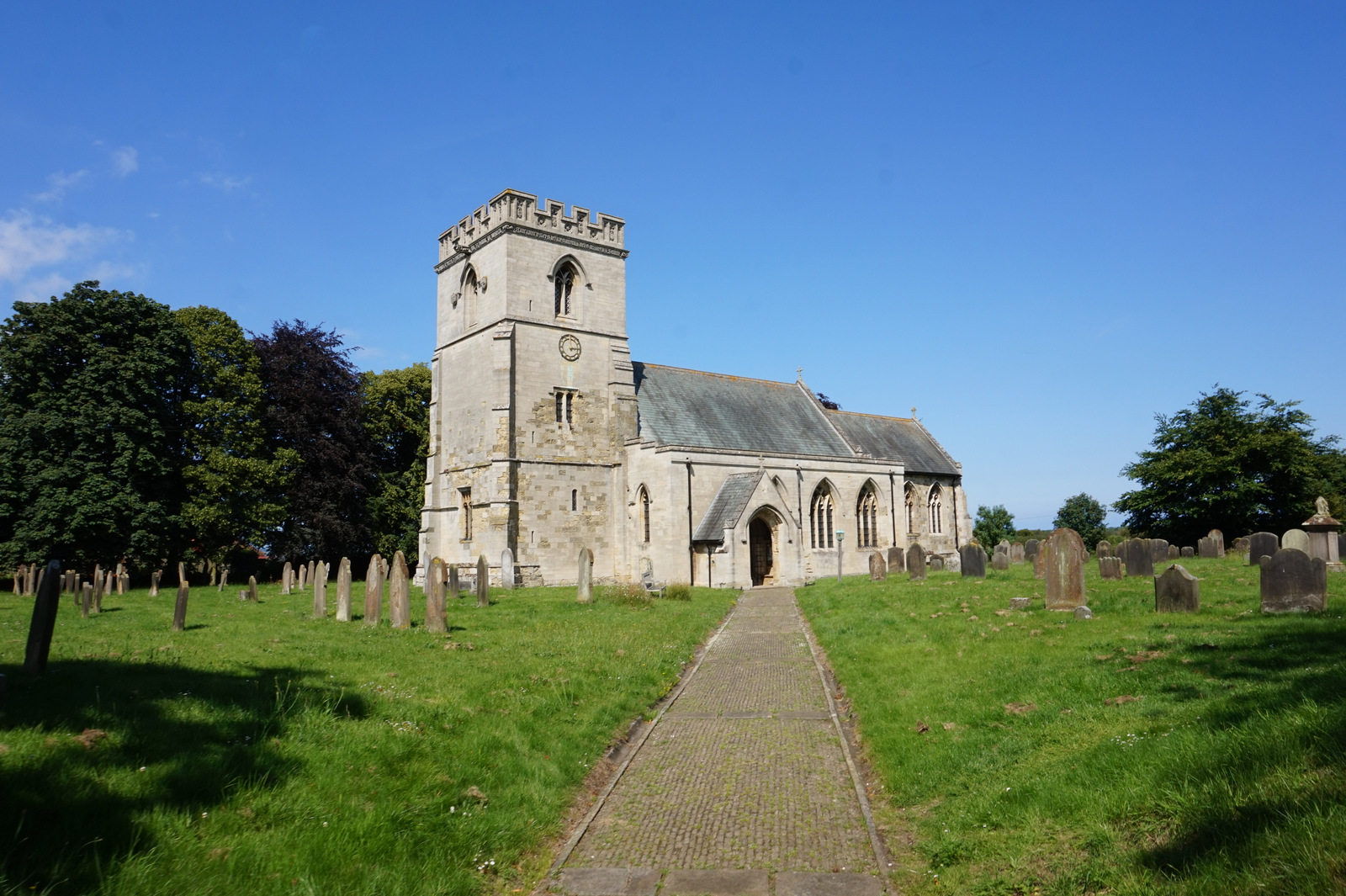
The church, in 2019

St Hilda's Church is the parish church of Sherburn, North Yorkshire, a village in England.

The church was built in the early 12th century, from which period the nave, chancel arch, and lower stage of the tower survive. The north arcade and tower arch were built around 1200. The exterior was largely rebuilt by C. Hodgson Fowler in 1909–12, his work including a new south arcade, porch, and upper part of the tower. He also replaced most of the doorway, with only a piece of arch and one moulding surviving for reuse. The church was grade II* listed in 1966.

The church is built of sandstone with a slate roof, and consists of a nave, north and south aisles, a south porch, a chancel with an organ chamber and a vestry, and a west tower. The tower has three stages, a chamfered plinth, buttresses, string courses, a square-headed two-light west window with a hood mould, a re-set corbel head, a two light window and a clock face on the south, paired bell openings with pointed heads and hood moulds, a carved cornice, and an embattled parapet with blind tracery and armorial shields. The porch is gabled, and has an entrance with a pointed arch and a hood mould, above which is a sundial. The south doorway has a round arch with three orders and beakhead moulding. Inside, there is a round Norman font and a 20th-century octagonal font, carved wooden furniture including the rood screen, pulpit, altar, choir stalls and pews, a Norman piscina on a pillar, and brass chandeliers.

== See also ==
- Grade II* listed churches in North Yorkshire (district)
- Listed buildings in Sherburn, North Yorkshire
