= Ganton railway station =

Disused railway station in North Yorkshire, England

Ganton
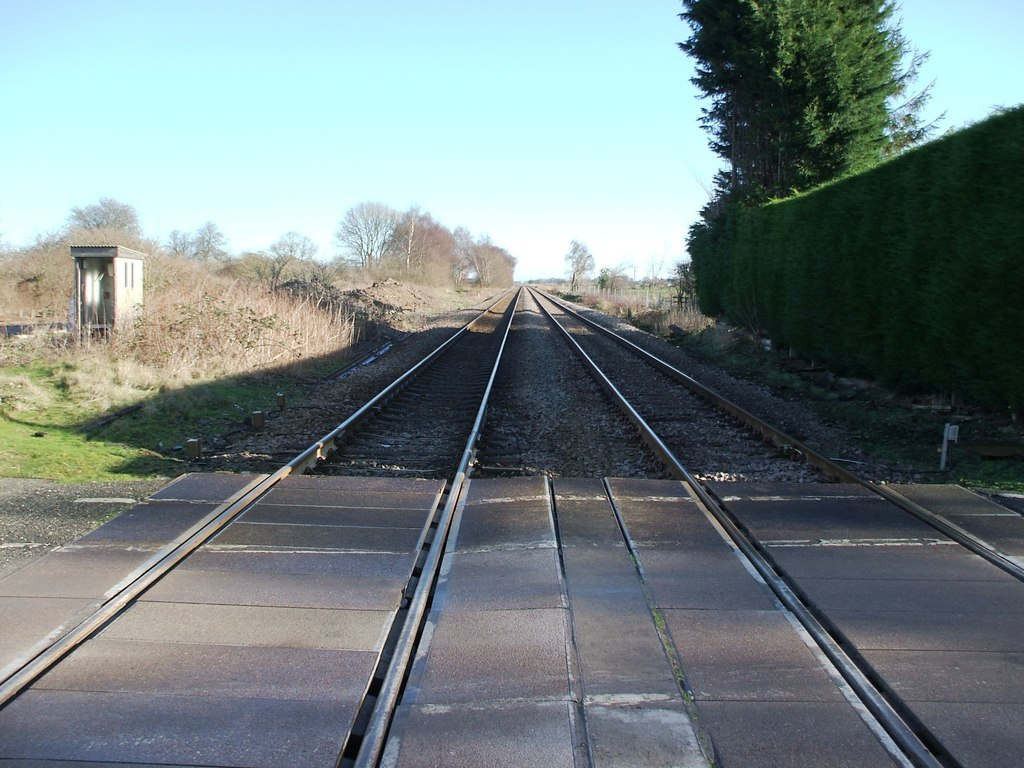
- Site of the former station in 2008

General information
- Location: Ganton, North Yorkshire; England
- Coordinates: 54.193900°N 0.496233°W
- Grid reference: SE982786
- Platforms: 2

Other information
- Status: Disused

History
- Original company: York and North Midland Railway
- Pre-grouping: North Eastern Railway
- Post-grouping: London and North Eastern Railway

Key dates
- 5 July 1845: Opened
- 22 September 1930: Closed to passengers
- 1964: Closed to goods
Location

Ganton railway station was a minor railway station serving the village of Ganton, North Yorkshire, England, on the York to Scarborough Line and was opened on 5 July 1845 by the York and North Midland Railway. In order to speed up traffic on the line, most of the intermediate stations including Ganton were closed to passenger traffic in 1930. Accordingly, it closed to passenger traffic on 22 September 1930, and was finally closed to goods traffic in 1964.

Preceding station	Historical railways	Following station
Weaverthorpe; Station closed; Line open	Y&NMR; York to Scarborough Line	Seamer
