= Heslerton railway station =

Disused railway station in North Yorkshire, England

Heslerton
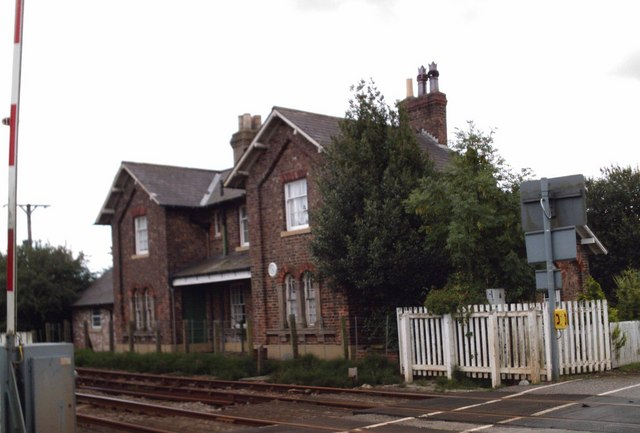
- The former station at Heslerton in 2006

General information
- Location: East Heslerton and West Heslerton, North Yorkshire; England
- Coordinates: 54.185700°N 0.619200°W
- Grid reference: SE902775
- Platforms: 2

Other information
- Status: place of residence

History
- Original company: York and North Midland Railway
- Pre-grouping: North Eastern Railway
- Post-grouping: London and North Eastern Railway

Key dates
- 5 July 1845: Opened
- 22 September 1930: Closed to passengers
- 10 August 1964: Goods yard closed
Location

Heslerton railway station was a minor railway station serving the villages of East Heslerton and West Heslerton in North Yorkshire, England. Located on the York to Scarborough Line it was opened on 5 July 1845 by the York and North Midland Railway. It closed on 22 September 1930.

== Early history (1845–1922) ==
The York to Scarborough Line was built by the York and North Midland Railway whose chairman was the "Railway King" George Hudson. Hudson envisaged Scarborough (the "Brighton of the North") as a major resort and for many years railway excursion traffic used the line which opened on 5 July 1845.

A minor road linking West Heslerton and Yedingham crosses the line just west of the station platforms with the goods yard further west of the crossing. Architect George Townsend Andrews designed the station building which included accommodation for the station master. The building was located on the up (towards York) side of the line and this was extended in 1872 with a second storey. A timber waiting room as provided on the down platform and there was a small coal yard adjacent to the down platform. The station was 54 3/4 miles (88.1 km) east of York, and 12 3/4 miles (20.5 km) south-east of Scarborough.

Bradshaw's railway guide of 1 March 1850 shows, in table 79, three passenger services per weekday (Monday to Saturday) and one service each way on Sunday. These trains operated between York and Scarborough.

By 1854 the York and North Midland Railway had become part of the North Eastern Railway who operated services serving the station until the end of 1922.

The signal box, located west of the crossing on the down side of the line, was bought into service in 1873, and unusually the gable end of the signal box was at a 90-degree angle to the running lines.

The July 1922 Bradshaw's shows four trains each way on a weekday with a single train each way on the Sunday which was timetabled to allow for a day at Scarborough.

== London and North Eastern Railway (1923–1947) ==
On 1 January 1923 the North Eastern Railway became part of the London and North Eastern Railway (LNER). With the introduction of bus services that served the centre of the local villages, passenger numbers declined and the local all stations train service was withdrawn from Knapton and other stations along the York to Scarborough line on 22 September 1930. The withdrawal of these slow stopping services released capacity on the line allowing more holiday and excursion trains to run to Scarborough and other Yorkshire Coast resorts.

Heslerton, like many other minor stations along the route, retained its goods facilities.

== British Railways (1948–1964) ==
Following nationalisation of the railways on 1 January 1948 the goods yard and signal box fell under the auspices of the North Eastern Region of British Railways.

The goods yard closed to general goods traffic on 10 August 1964.

The signal box was closed on 11 December 1993 as part of a programme of signalling and level crossing upgrades.

Preceding station	Historical railways	Following station
Knapton; Station closed; Line open	Y&NMR; York to Scarborough Line	Weaverthorpe; Station closed; Line open
