= St. John Ellis =

Former GB international rugby league footballer and coach

St John Ellis

Personal information
- Full name: St John Ellis
- Born: 3 October 1964 York, England
- Died: 31 December 2005 (aged 41) Castleford, England

Playing information
- Position: Wing, Fullback
Club
Years	Team	Pld	T	G	FG	P
1986–89	York	75	32	125	0	378
1989–94	Castleford	173+2	97	17	0	422
1995	South Queensland Crushers	9	1	13	0	30
1995	Bradford Bulls	11+1	5	14	0	48
1996	Halifax	7	1	0	0	4
1997	Keighley Cougars	11	3	0	0	12
1997–98	Hunslet Hawks	42+1	17	117	6	308
1999–02	Doncaster Dragons	17	3	5	0	22
	Total	349	159	291	6	1224
Representative
Years	Team	Pld	T	G	FG	P
1991–94	Great Britain	0+3	0	0	0	0

Coaching information
Club
Years	Team	Gms	W	D	L	W%
1999–05	Doncaster Dragons

St John Ellis (3 October 1964 – 31 December 2005), also known by the nickname of "Singe", was an English professional rugby league footballer and coach who played primarily as a winger.

Born in York, Ellis made his professional debut with his hometown club York in 1986. He joined Castleford in 1989, where we won the Yorkshire Cup and Regal Trophy. He scored 97 tries in 175 appearances for Castleford, and earned three caps for Great Britain whilst playing for the club. After a brief spell in Australia with South Queensland Crushers, he returned to England and went on to play for Bradford Bulls, Halifax, Keighley Cougars and Hunslet before finishing his playing career at Doncaster Dragons. Ellis was appointed head coach at Doncaster in 1999 while still playing for the club, and remained in the role until his death in 2005.

== Background ==
St John Ellis was born in York on 3 October 1964, his forename was reportedly inspired after his mother saw a news presenter with the same name on television. Ellis was born to a large family; he was one of nine brothers and also had six sisters. He grew up in Fulford and attended Fulford School.

== Playing career ==
=== Early career ===
Ellis started his career with amateur club Southlands before signing for his hometown professional club, York. He made his debut in December 1986 against Fulham.

=== Castleford ===
Ellis was signed by Castleford in 1989. On 10 December 1989, he scored five tries in a match against Whitehaven – a joint record at the club for most tries scored in a single game.

Ellis played in Castleford's 11–8 victory over Wakefield Trinity in the 1990 Yorkshire Cup Final during the 1990–91 season at Elland Road, Leeds on Sunday 23 September 1990.

Ellis played in Castleford's 12–28 defeat by Wigan in the 1992 Challenge Cup Final during the 1991–92 season at Wembley Stadium, London on Saturday 2 May 1992, in front of a crowd of 77,386.

Ellis scored 40 tries in 41 games for Castleford in the 1993–94 season, a club record for most tries scored in a single season until it was surpassed by Denny Solomona in 2016. He played in Castleford's 33–2 victory over Wigan in the 1993–94 Regal Trophy Final at Headingley, Leeds on Saturday 22 January 1994.

Ellis scored a total of 97 tries in 175 appearances for Castleford, and is a Hall of Fame inductee at the club.

=== Later career ===
In 1995, moved to Australia and joined the newly formed South Queensland Crushers, playing in their first ever league game against Canberra Raiders. He made nine appearances for the club during the 1995 ARL season before returning to England to join Bradford Bulls. He then joined Halifax, but made only a handful of appearances before suffering a broken leg. He joined Keighley Cougars in 1997 before moving to Hunslet later that year. Ellis scored his 1,000th career point while playing for Hunslet. His finished his playing career at Doncaster Dragons.

=== International honours ===
Ellis won three caps for Great Britain while at Castleford, appearing as a substitute in both matches against France in 1991, and a further substitute appearance in 1994, also against France. Ellis also represented Great Britain in the 1994 Rugby League World Sevens held in Sydney, Australia.

== Coaching career ==
Ellis was appointed as head coach at Doncaster Dragons while still playing for the club. He continued to coach the team after his playing career ended, and was the longest-serving coach of any professional club at the time of his death in 2005.

== Personal life ==
Ellis worked as a plasterer during much of his rugby league career, and later also worked as a salesman. On 31 December 2005, Ellis collapsed after a pre-season training session with Doncaster, and was pronounced dead on arrival at Pontefract Hospital. It is believed the cause of death was pulmonary arterial hypertension which is a rare condition that affects about 1 in 1 million people. His funeral was held at York Minster, and was attended by over 1,000 people. He was survived by his wife, Melanie, and two daughters.
