= Fulford School =

School in York, England

Location
- Fulfordgate; Heslington Lane; York, North Yorkshire, YO10 4FY; England; 53°56′11″N 01°04′01″W

Information
- Type: Academy
- Established: 1963
- Local authority: City of York
- Department for Education URN: 144711 Tables
- Ofsted: Reports
- Staff: 135
- Enrolment: 1,400
- Houses: Apollo, Artemis, Athena, Atlas
- Colours: Indigo and blue
- School VLE: http://vle.fulford.york.sch.uk
- Website: http://www.fulford.york.sch.uk

Fulford School is a coeducational comprehensive school on Fulfordgate near Heslington Lane in Fulford, York, England.

== History ==
Fulford School was founded in 1963 and has been a comprehensive school since 1970. The site is close to the former Fulfordgate football ground, demolished in 1932. It is also adjacent to the Germany Beck site, where The Battle of Fulford happened. Its original motto was 'A posse ad esse' which translates to "from possibility to realisation". This can still be seen in the Archimedes block where there is a logo print on the floor.

The school became an academy in 2018, as the founder school of a multi-academy trust.

== Key information ==
The school is situated in Fulford on the southern edge of the city of York, about 0.5 miles (0.8 km) from the University of York. It currently takes in pupils from York including Hungate, Fulford and Fishergate as well as from the nearby villages of Dunnington, Elvington, Wheldrake, Thorganby, Escrick, Naburn and Bishopthorpe. The current headteacher is Mr Harris, who was appointed in 2024.

== Performance ==
Fulford School was highlighted by The Independent as having the third best sixth form of all Comprehensive Schools in England. It has been suggested that this may be the reason why many pupils from independent schools have left the private sector and continued their studies at Fulford School.

In 2007, the school received the best A level results in York LEA area, and the third best in the Yorkshire and the Humber region, higher than four grammar schools.

In 2013, 80% of all pupils attained five GCSEs grade A* to C, including English and Mathematics. This is an increase of four percentage points since 2012.

In 2019 the school's GCSE results were above average, and the Progress 8 measure was well above average. In the same year, the average A level grade at the school was B, compared to B− across York and C+ nationally.

In the 2012 government Top 10 list of 'Highest proportion of pupils going to Oxbridge Universities' (non-selective schools/colleges), Fulford School was listed joint second, with 6%.

As of 2020, the school has not been inspected by Ofsted since 2011, when it was judged Outstanding.

== Achievements ==
A group of students from the school, working with students from University of York, won the Regional Millennium Volunteer of the Year Team Award in 2007 for their work in renovating a youth room for young people.

== Headteachers ==
1. J. Swan (1963–1969)
2. J. A. D. Shaw (1969–1978/79)
3. E. K. Hayton (1978/79–2001)
4. Steven Smith (2001–2013)
5. Lorna Savage (2013–2019)
6. Stephen Lewis (2019–2024)
7. Russel Harris (2024–present)

== Expansion ==
An increase in the number of pupils on roll led to a £3.5 million building programme in 2003, which included the 'Archimedes Block' or 'A block'. This has added several new specialist classrooms: 4 rooms for geography, 8 for mathematics, and 2 for ICT. The addition of specialist status in Mathematics and Computing has also facilitated the upgrade of ICT facilities in the school, with a new centre added in 2006 to allow the school to offer 10 places to students with autism spectrum disorders.

In 2015, major housing developments within the school catchment area in Hungate, Germany Beck and the Barbican site led to £7 million expansion. This included the 'Newton block' or 'N block'. This has added six new classrooms; 5 for geography, 1 for history; and a new sixth form common room. In addition, the old sixth form area was converted into 2 art/textiles rooms along with a new science lab. These facilities opened in September 2015.

A purpose built sports hall was opened by cricketer Ryan Sidebottom in March 2016, with the new facilities being shared with the wider community outside of school hours.

In order to cater for the extra students, the school canteen was refurbished and redesigned, which was completed in October 2016. A larger food technology room, photography studio, drama studio and classroom have also been created in the Hawking block.

In 2020, £1 million of funding was approved for a new access road from the adjacent Germany Beck housing development. The funding also includes refurbishing existing temporary classrooms, allowing students and staff to socially distance more easily during the COVID-19 pandemic.

== Notable former pupils ==
- Rowan Coultas (born 1997), Olympic snowboarder
- Charlie Cresswell (born 2002), Professional footballer for Leeds United
- St John Ellis (1964–2005), Rugby League player
- Sarah Everard (1987–2021), murder victim
- Jeff Fairburn (born 1966), CEO of Persimmon plc
- Niall Huggins, (born 2000), footballer
- Fiona Mozley (born 1988), novelist
- Donna Preston, (born 1986) comedian and actress
- Rusko (born 1985), DJ, known as a pioneer of the music genre Dubstep
- Carla Woodcock, (born 1998) actress
- Abi Miller, (born 2007) professional cyclist
