= Weaverthorpe railway station =

Disused railway station in North Yorkshire, England

Weaverthorpe
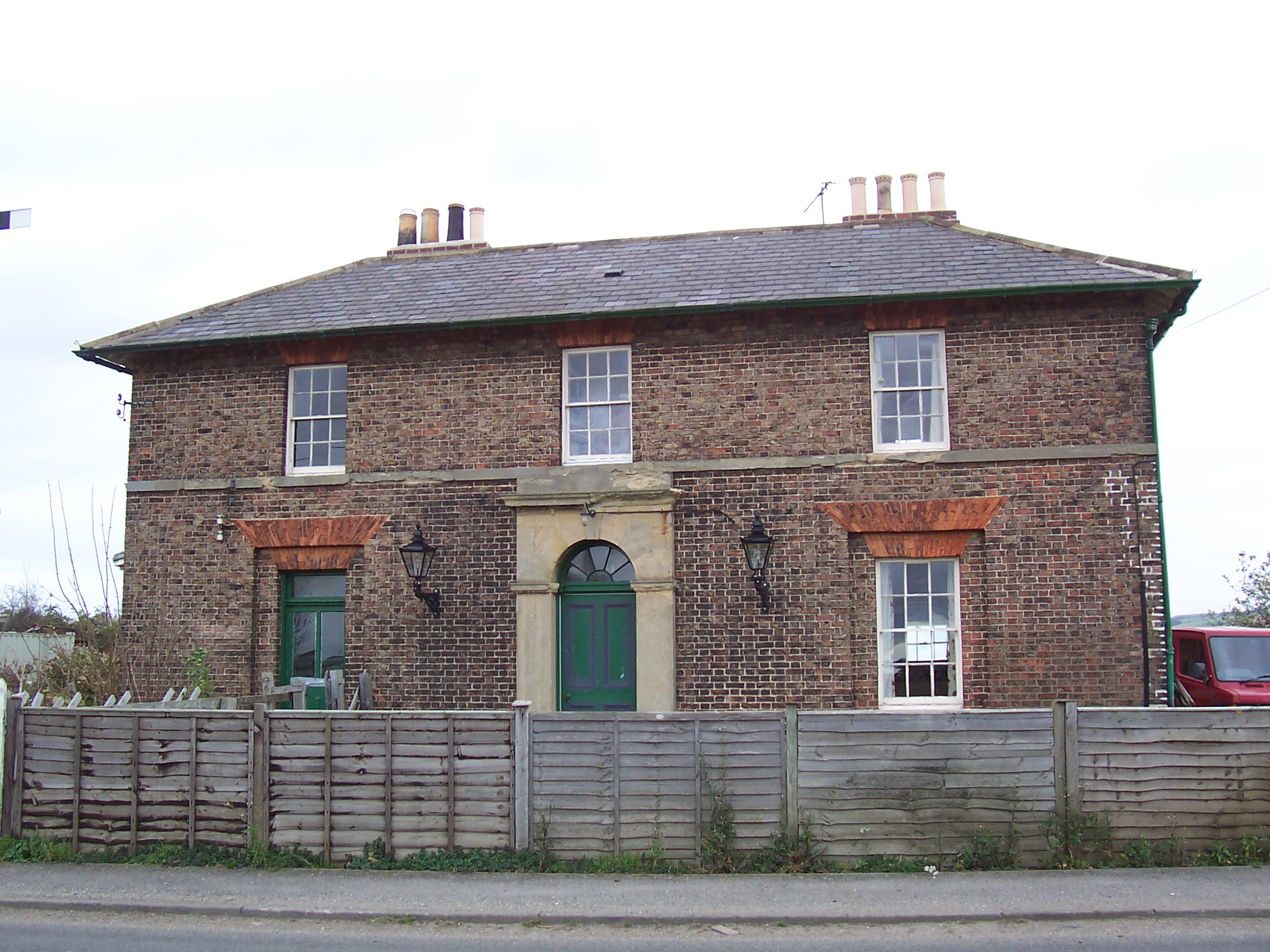
- The former station at Weaverthorpe

General information
- Location: Sherburn, North Yorkshire; England
- Coordinates: 54.190000°N 0.535000°W
- Grid reference: SE957781
- Platforms: 2

Other information
- Status: Disused

History
- Original company: York and North Midland Railway
- Pre-grouping: North Eastern Railway
- Post-grouping: London and North Eastern Railway

Key dates
- 5 July 1845: Opened
- 22 September 1930: Closed
Location

Weaverthorpe railway station was a minor railway station serving the village of Sherburn in North Yorkshire, England. Located on the York to Scarborough Line it was opened on 5 July 1845 by the York and North Midland Railway. It closed to passengers on 22 September 1930.

== History ==
Opened in July 1845, the station was 12 miles (19 km) east of Malton and 11 miles (18 km) west of Scarborough. The station was originally named Sherburn, but was renamed Wykeham (after a village 3 miles (5 km) distant) on 1 April 1874, to avoid confusion with three other stations also named Sherburn. The name changed again after the opening of a station in Wykeham itself (on the Forge Valley Line), and the station became 'Weaverthorpe' on 1 May 1882.

Services at the station consisted of four per day (each way) in 1847, and 1866 rising to six per day by 1877. Bradshaws timetable for 1906, still lists six stopping services each way, every two to three hours.

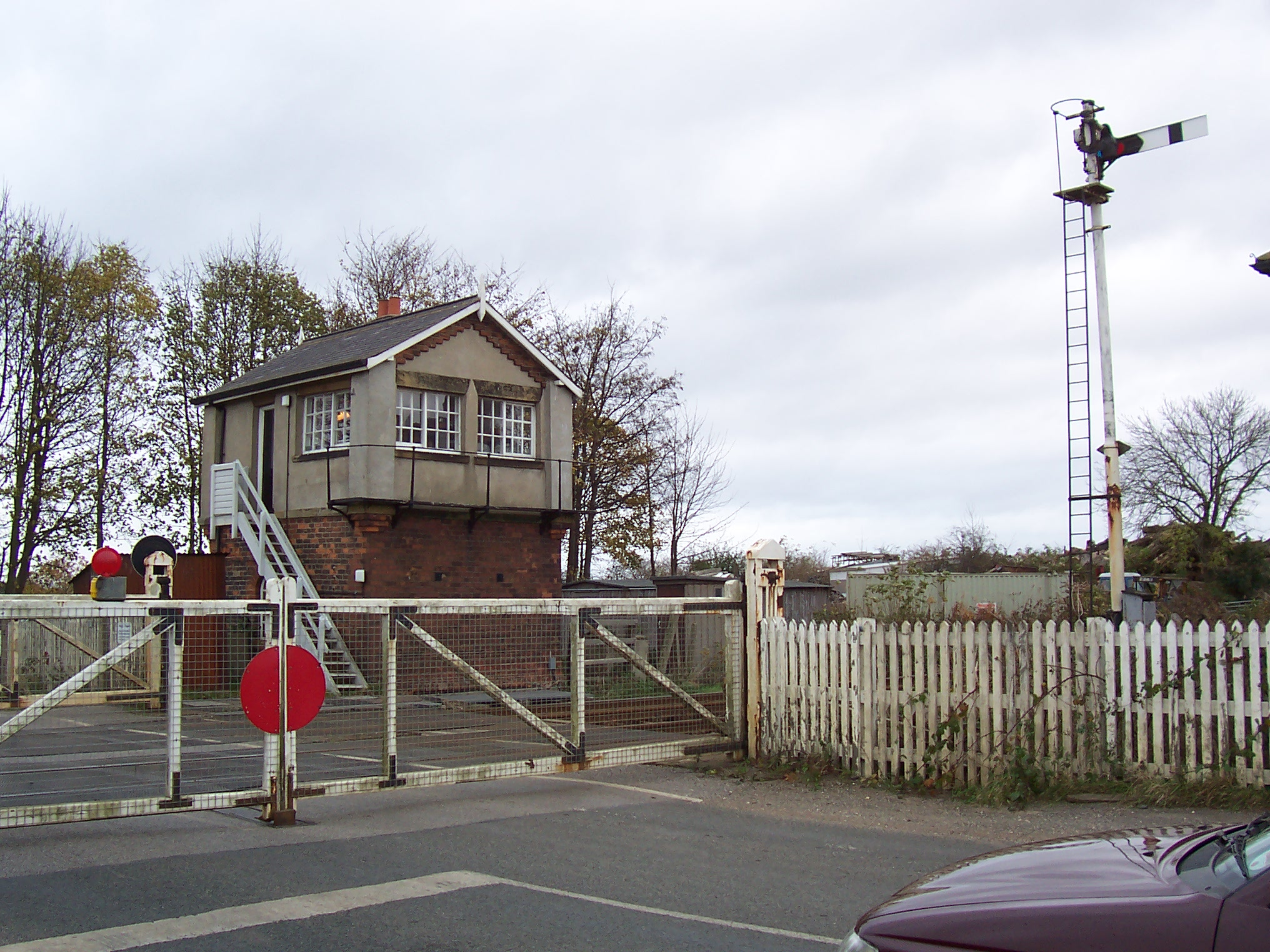
The signal box and level crossing

The station, along with all others on the York to Scarborough line (save for Malton and Seamer), were closed in September 1930. This was due to the low receipts generated by each station, but additionally, the closures allowed the LNER to speed up the services on the line.

Weaverthorpe station was to the immediate east of the level crossing, with the goods crane on the west side. The station did retain a small goods yard until 1981, which handled steel traffic for a local construction company.

Passengers wishing to go to Weaverthorpe would have been very disappointed as that village was located 5 miles (8 km) distant, over the Wolds escarpment! Both the station house (now in private ownership) and the signal box, were grade II listed in December 1987. The signal box is the only one still in operation for the 18-mile (29 km) stretch between Malton and Seamer, and is due to be closed in 2025, when signalling on the line will be transferred to York Rail Operating Centre.

== See also ==
- Listed buildings in Sherburn, North Yorkshire

Preceding station	Historical railways	Following station
Heslerton; Station closed; Line open	Y&NMR; York to Scarborough Line	Ganton; Station closed; Line open
