= Listed buildings in Sherburn, North Yorkshire =

Sherburn is a civil parish in the county of North Yorkshire, England. It contains 13 listed buildings that are recorded in the National Heritage List for England. Of these, one is listed at Grade II*, the middle of the three grades, and the others are at Grade II, the lowest grade. The parish contains the village of Sherburn and the surrounding area. The listed buildings consist of a church and associated structures, houses, farmhouses and farm buildings, a milestone, a railway station and signal box, and a village cross.

== Key ==
Grade	Criteria
II*	Particularly important buildings of more than special interest
II	Buildings of national importance and special interest

== Buildings ==
Name and location	Photograph	Date	Notes	Grade
St Hilda's Church; 54.18373°N 0.53120°W		Early 12th century	The church has been altered and extended through the centuries, and the exterior was largely rebuilt by C. Hodgson Fowler in 1909–12. The church is built in sandstone with a slate roof, and consists of a nave, north and south aisles, a south porch, a chancel with an organ chamber and a vestry, and a west tower. The tower has three stages, a chamfered plinth, buttresses, string courses, a square-headed two-light west window with a hood mould, a re-set corbel head, a two light window and a clock face on the south, paired bell openings with pointed heads and hood moulds, a carved cornice, and an embattled parapet with blind tracery and armorial shields. The porch is gabled, and has an entrance with a pointed arch and a hood mould, above which is a sundial. The south doorway has a round arch with three orders and beakhead moulding.	II*
Farm buildings at the rear of Corner Farmhouse; 54.17783°N 0.53223°W	—	18th century	The range of farm buildings was raised later. The original part is in chalk stone, the raised parts are in sandstone, the right gable end is in breeze blocks, and teh range has a pantile roof. There is one storey and lofts, and the front facing the road contains a shuttered opening. At the rear is a four-bay cart and implement shed flanked by stables. On the left gable end is a lifting doorway.	II
Brewery House; 54.17739°N 0.53587°W	—	Late 18th century	A farmhouse, later offices, the front and right return are in pink-cream brick, the left return is in stone, partly rendered, all on a painted stone plinth, with quoins, and a slate roof with coped gables and shaped kneelers. There are two storeys and three bays. The central doorway has pilasters, a frieze with rosettes, and a cornice hood. The windows are sashes with painted lintels and keystones.	II
Lychgate and churchyard wall 54.18340°N 0.53166°W		Late 18th century	The walls enclosing the churchyard of St Hilda's Church are the earlier part, and the lychgate, designed by C. Hodgson Fowler, was added in about 1912. The wall is mainly in mottled red brick with sandstone coping. The lychgate has sandstone walls, it is timber framed, and has a slate roof with gables, bargeboards and pendant finials. It contains double timber gates with wrought iron hinges.	II
Former Pigeon Pie; 54.17778°N 0.53361°W	—	Late 18th century	Two houses, later a public house, subsequently returning to residential use. It is in chalk stone, rendered and colourwashed, with a brick dentilled eaves course on the left, stepped eaves on the right, and a pantile roof with a coped gable and shaped kneeler on the right. There are two storeys and six bays. On the front is a flat-roofed porch with a doorway, and there is another doorway to the left. In the left bay is a coach arch and a loft window above. The other windows are sashes, the ground floor openings with painted wedge lintels.	II
Pasture House Farmhouse; 54.17762°N 0.53307°W	—	Late 18th to early 19th century	The farmhouse is in brown brick with a pantile roof. There are two storeys, an L-shaped plan, and a front of four bays, the right by blank. The doorway has a fanlight, the windows are sashes, and all the openings have painted wedge lintels.	II
Corner Farmhouse; 54.17782°N 0.53276°W	—	Early 19th century	The farmhouse is in brown brick with a slate roof. There are two storeys and three bays. The central doorway has a divided fanlight, and the windows are sashes. All the openings have painted wedge lintels and keystones.	II
Milestone; 54.17784°N 0.54631°W		Early 19th century (or earlier)	The milestone, on the north side of the A64 road, is in sandstone, it has a rounded top, and is about 1 metre (3 ft 3 in) in height. The milestone is uninscribed, and marks the midpoint between Malton and Scarborough.	II
Weaverthorpe railway station 54.19004°N 0.53495°W		1845	The station building incorporating the stationmaster's house, later a private house, was designed by G. T. Andrews for the York and North Midland Railway Company. The building is in mottled brick on a sandstone plinth, with sandstone dressings, a sill band, and an overhanging hipped slate roof. There are two storeys and three bays. In the centre is a round-arched doorway with pilasters, a radial fanlight, a keystone and a cornice. It is flanked by flat-arched recesses, the left containing the ticket office door, and the right a sash window. The upper floor windows are also sashes, and all the openings apart from the main doorway have gauged brick arches. The left return has two bays and a single-storey outbuilding. The right bay contains a canted bay window and a station clock.	II
9 St Hilda's Street; 54.17844°N 0.53316°W	—	1847	A house in a terrace, it is in brown brick with a pantile roof. There are two storeys and one bay. On the ground floor is a doorway, to its left is a horizontally sliding sash window, and there is a similar window on the upper floor. The ground floor openings have painted wedge lintels, and the upper floor window has a timber lintel.	II
13 St Hilda's Street; 54.17849°N 0.53316°W	—	1847	A house at the end of a terrace, it is in brown brick with a pantile roof. There are two storeys and one bay. On the ground floor is a doorway, to its left is a horizontally sliding sash window, both under a continuous painted wedge lintel. The upper floor contains a similar window with a timber lintel.	II
Weaverthorpe signal box 54.19019°N 0.53519°W		c. 1900	The signal box was built for the North Eastern Railway. It is in red brick, the upper storey rendered, and it has a gabled slate roof with finials. There are two storeys, the upper storey jettied on stepped corbels, and with clasping pilasters. The upper storey contains sash windows, most horizontally sliding. On the west side, external steps lead up to the doorway.	II
Village cross 54.18252°N 0.53155°W	—	c. 1912	The village cross, standing in a road junction, is in limestone with an octagonal plan. It consists of a tapering shaft on three moulded steps, with a plinth carved in low relief with scenes from the life of St Hilda. On the shaft is a carving in high relief of St Hilda in a trefoil-headed niche with a moulded shelf, on ammonite brackets and with a crocketed canopy. At the top is a clover-leaf cross with a carved ammonite in the centre.	II
