= St Peter's Church, Wintringham =

Coordinates: 54.1468°N 0.6432°W

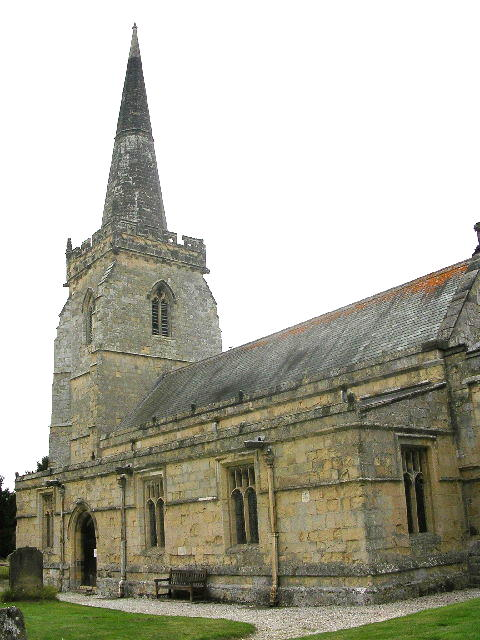
- St Peter's Church, Wintringham, from the south-east

- Location in North Yorkshire
- OS grid reference: SE 887 731
- Location: Wintringham, North Yorkshire
- Country: England
- Denomination: Anglican
- Website: Churches Conservation Trust

History
- Dedication: Saint Peter

Architecture
- Functional status: Redundant
- Heritage designation: Grade I
- Designated: 10 October 1966
- Architectural type: Church
- Style: Norman, Gothic
- Groundbreaking: 12th century

Specifications
- Materials: Calcareous sandstone, Westmorland slate roofs

St Peter's Church is a redundant Anglican church in the village of Wintringham, North Yorkshire, England (grid reference SE 887 731). It is recorded in the National Heritage List for England as a designated Grade I listed building, and is under the care of the Churches Conservation Trust. The architectural historian Nikolaus Pevsner described the building as "the most rewarding church in the East Riding with an exceptional collection of furnishings".

== History ==
There is no mention of the church in the Domesday Book, but the chancel is Norman in style. The chancel dates from the 12th century, while much of the rest of the church dates from the 14th century. The east end of the church was rebuilt, and windows were added to the nave, in the 15th century. The tower, dating originally from the late 14th century, was repaired in 1818. The roofs were restored in 1887 by Oldrid Scott, and oak fittings were added to the chancel by Temple Moore in 1889–91. It was vested with the Churches Conservation Trust in April 2004. The Trust arranged for repairs, which were started in the following year and took two years to complete.

== Architecture ==
=== Structure ===
The church is constructed in local calcareous sandstone with Westmorland slate roofs. Its plan consists of a four-bay nave with north and south aisles, a three-bay chancel, and a west tower with a spire. At the eastern end of each aisle is a chapel. The tower has four stages on a plinth, with angle buttresses, and string courses between the stages. The west window has three lights and Perpendicular tracery. The top stage contains paired louvred bell openings with Decorated tracery. The parapet is embattled, decorated and pierced. At the corners are pinnacles and water spouts. Under the parapet is a decorated corbel table. The spire is recessed and octagonal. The church is entered by a south door. At the east end of the church are two two-light Perpendicular windows. There are crosses on the gable ends of the nave and chancel. Inside the church are a tower arch, a chancel arch and north and south arcades.

=== Fittings and furniture ===
On the walls are areas of painting dating from the medieval and post-Reformation periods; otherwise the walls are whitewashed. In the south wall of the chancel is a double aumbry. The chapels are divided from the east ends of the aisle by 15th-century embattled carved screens. On the south wall of the south chapel is a piscina with a trefoiled head, and in the north wall is a niche. Inside the base of the tower is an arcaded screen dated 1723. Also in the tower is a hatchment dated 1723 and two painted panels. The lectern and double-decker pulpit both date from the 17th century, as do the poppyhead carvings on the nave pews. Over the pulpit is an octagonal sounding board with pendant finials. The font consists of a tub in Norman style with an octagonal painted cover dated 1736. In the north aisle are boards painted with the Ten Commandments and the Lord's Prayer, and over the chancel arch is a painted text from Genesis. The stained glass in the tracery of the aisle and nave windows dates from the 15th century and depicts saints.

== See also ==
- Grade I listed buildings in North Yorkshire (district)
- Listed buildings in Wintringham, North Yorkshire
- List of churches preserved by the Churches Conservation Trust in Northern England
