= St Nicholas' Church, Ganton =

Church in Ganton, North Yorkshire, England

Coordinates: 54°11′05″N 0°29′04″W

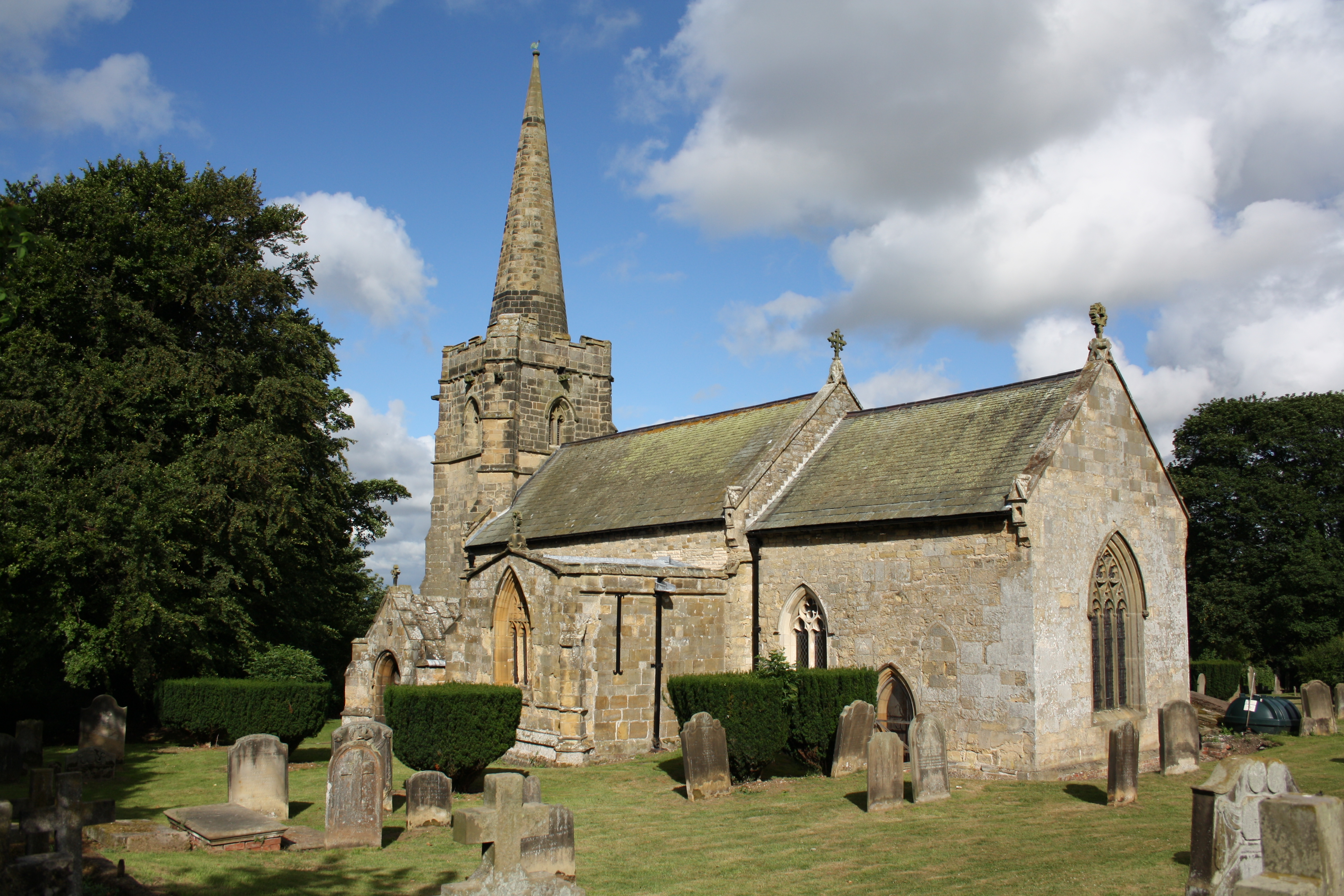
The church in 2010

St Nicholas' Church is the parish church of Ganton, a village in North Yorkshire, in England.

The oldest parts of the church are the chancel and the transept arch, which date from the 13th century. Much of the church was rebuilt in the 14th century, and the nave and south transept survive from this period. In the 15th century, the tower and porch were added. The church was restored in 1843, the work including partial rebuilding of the chancel. The church was grade II* listed in 1966. In 2012, it was placed on the Heritage at Risk Register, as it was in urgent need of repair, but was removed from the register in 2014 as repairs were completed.

The church is built of sandstone, the main roof is in stone slate, and the roof of the porch is in stone slab, and the church is in Perpendicular style. It consists of a nave, a north aisle, a south porch, a south transept, a chancel with a north chapel, and a west steeple. The steeple has a tower with two stages on a plinth, diagonal buttresses, a three-light west window with a pointed head, a southeast stair turret, clock faces on the north and west sides, a string course, bell openings with hood moulds, and a corbel table with masks, fleurons and grotesques. At the top is an embattled parapet and a recessed octagonal spire. Above the porch is a heraldic shield with a coat of arms. Inside the church is a baroque monument to Sir John Legard, and stained glass windows, one by Jean-Baptiste Capronnier and another by William Wailes.

The church forms part of the Hertford Benefice within the Deanery of Scarborough. The benefice is named after the River Hertford, which flows through the area.

== See also ==
- Grade II* listed churches in North Yorkshire (district)
- Listed buildings in Ganton
