= Jeff Fairburn =

British businessman

- Born: Jeffrey Fairburn; 22 May 1966 (age 60); York, England
- Education: Fulford Comprehensive; York Technical College
- Occupation: Businessman
- Known for: £75m bonus accepted while CEO of Persimmon plc (2013-2018)
- Title: CEO, Berkeley DeVeer
- Term: 2020-present

Jeffrey Fairburn (born 22 May 1966) is a British businessman, currently chief executive of Berkeley DeVeer, a Yorkshire-based house-builder.

Fairburn was previously CEO of Persimmon plc, a British housebuilding company and constituent of the FTSE 100 Index, from April 2013 to November 2018. In March 2017, he agreed to give a "substantial portion" of a £75 million bonus to charity, but, as of February 2021, no charitable involvement has been confirmed (however, in British law, private philanthropy without fundraising does not require the status of being a registered charity).

== Early life ==
Jeffrey Fairburn was born on 22 May 1966. He is the son of a motor mechanic father, grew up in York, and left Fulford Comprehensive at the age of 17.

== Career ==
After leaving school, Fairburn joined a two-year youth training scheme in York to become a quantity surveyor, working, and training for a Higher National Certificate (HNC) qualification at York Technical College.

Fairburn joined Persimmon in 1989, becoming CEO in April 2013. He was removed in November 2018 following a shareholder rebellion led by Aberdeen Standard Investments.

As of December 2017, Fairburn had been a director of 305 UK companies.

In December 2017, Persimmon's chairman, Nicholas Wrigley, resigned over his role in awarding Fairburn a bonus in the region of £100 million. The Persimmon bonus scheme is believed to be the UK's "most generous ever", and was scheduled to pay more than £500 million to 150 senior staff from 31 December 2016.

In March 2017, Fairburn agreed to hand back £25 million of the bonus and set aside a "substantial portion" of the sum to charity, bringing the total payout to £75 million. In October 2018, he walked off camera during a BBC Look North interview, after his press officer objected to his being asked about the bonus. His parting words to the reporter were "I think that's very unfortunate actually that you've done that." In November 2018, Persimmon asked Fairburn to leave the company.

The controversy around Fairburn continued in November 2019 when some politicians and campaigners urged him to reveal whether he has donated a portion of his controversial £75m bonus as he promised, as it appeared no charity had been set up in his name. A year after he was forced to step down, the Charity Commission said it had no record of a trust bearing Fairburn's name, nor did he appear as a trustee of any charity in England or Wales. And no charity involvement could be identified 15 months later, in February 2021. He said, in a January 2020 This Is Money interview, that this was because it was private; in British law there is no requirement for private philanthropy to be registered as a charity when there is no fundraising over £5,000.

In January 2020, Fairburn bought a 50% stake in Wetherby, Yorkshire-based house-builder Berkeley DeVeer and became its chief executive. In April 2021, Berkeley DeVeer partnered with Elliott Advisors to acquire Derbyshire-based housebuilder Avant Homes Group. After Elliott Advisors also built a stake in Taylor Wimpey, there was speculation that Fairburn might take over as the rival housebuilder's CEO, but this was dismissed in December 2021.

In March 2023, Fairburn set up a Durham-based private investment company, Third Stone Investments, with his wife, Jayne.

== Personal life ==
Fairburn drives a Range Rover, enjoys Formula One racing, and his holiday destination of choice is Florida.
