= Listed buildings in Wintringham, North Yorkshire =

Wintringham is a civil parish in the county of North Yorkshire, England. It contains six listed buildings that are recorded in the National Heritage List for England. Of these, one is listed at Grade I, the highest of the three grades, and the others are at Grade II, the lowest grade. The parish contains the village of Wintringham and the surrounding area. The listed buildings consist of a church, a country house and associated structures, and a farmhouse and farm building.

== Key ==
Grade	Criteria
I	Buildings of exceptional interest, sometimes considered to be internationally important
II	Buildings of national importance and special interest

== Buildings ==
Name and location	Photograph	Date	Notes	Grade
St Peter's Church; 54.14681°N 0.64319°W		12th century	The church has been altered and extended through the centuries, including a restoration and re-roofing in 1887 by John Oldrid Scott. It is built in sandstone with a slate roof, and consists of a nave, north and south aisles, a chancel and a west steeple. The steeple has a tower with four stages, a double-chamfered plinth, diagonal buttresses, a southeast stair turret, string courses, a three-light west window, slit windows, paired louvred bell openings with hood moulds, a decorated corbel table, an embattled parapet pierced by quatrefoils, and a recessed octagonal spire. There are also embattled parapets on the chancel.	I
Place Newton and walls 54.14039°N 0.63988°W	—	1714	A small country house that was later extended. It is in orange-red brick, the extension is in red brick, with sandstone dressings, quoins and hipped slate roofs. The entrance front has a chamfered plinth, an eaves band, two storeys and attics, three bays under an open pediment containing a lunette, flanking full-height bay windows with half-hexagonal roofs, and a two-storey one-bay extension on the right. The porch is canted and has sunk pilaster jambs with scalloped imposts. Above it is an oriel window, and the other windows are sashes with grooved wedge lintels. The garden walls are in red brick with sandstone coping, and an end pier with a cornice and a pyramidal cap.	II
Farm buildings northwest of Manor House Farmhouse; 54.14660°N 0.64786°W		18th century	The farm buildings are in whitewashed chalkstone on brick footings, with a stepped brick eaves course and a pantile roof. There is one storey, and they contain three large windows with painted timber lintels.	II
Manor House Farmhouse; 54.14635°N 0.64752°W	—	Late 18th century	The farmhouse is in pink mottled brick with a cogged eaves course and a pantile roof. There are two storeys and five bays. The central doorway has a fanlight and a hood on brackets, and the windows are sashes with segmental arches.	II
Stable building west of Place Newton; 54.14029°N 0.64059°W	—	Early 19th century	The stables and lofts are in sandy limestone on footings of red brick, with slate roofs. There is an L-shaped plan, with two ranges, each with one storey and lofts, and three bays, and a single-storey outbuilding. They contain doorways and windows, mainly small-pane pivoting lights.	II
Stableyard building west of Place Newton; 54.14029°N 0.64030°W	—	Early 19th century	A harness room, later used for other purposes, in sandy limestone with a slate roof. There are two storeys and one bay. It contains a board door, over which is a horizontally sliding sash window, both with painted timber lintels. On the left return is a lunette under a semicircular arch.	II
