= James Redfern =

British artist

James Frank Redfern
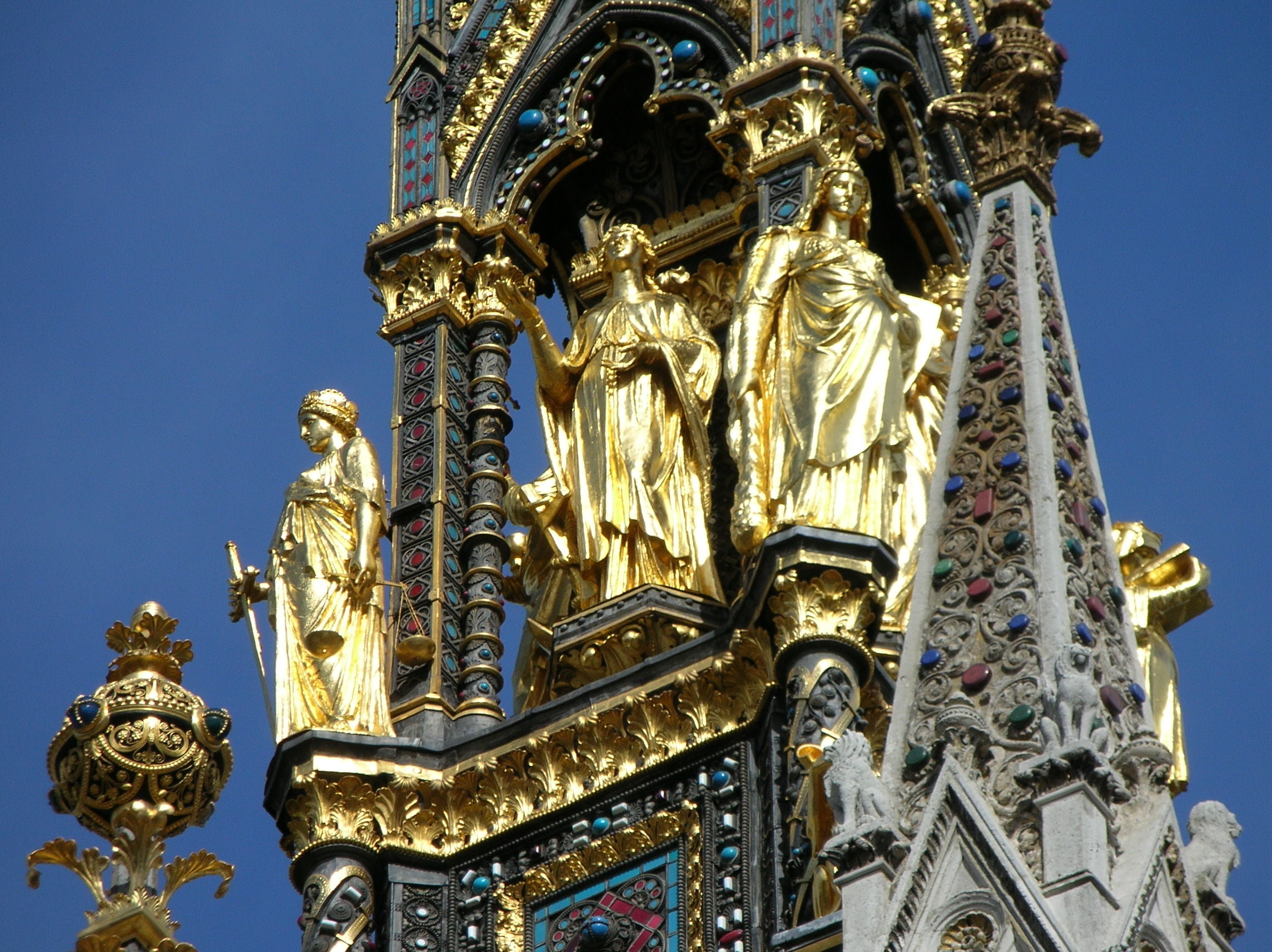
- The virtues at the top of the Albert Memorial
- Born: 1838; Hartington, Derbyshire, England
- Died: 1876
- Education: Paris
- Occupation: Sculptor

James Frank Redfern (1838–1876), sculptor, was born at Hartington in Derbyshire, in 1838. He is best known for works incorporated into Gothic churches, including Salisbury Cathedral and Gloucester Cathedral. He also created the eight virtue statues which are included in the Albert Memorial.

== Early life ==
As a boy Redfern showed a taste for art by carving and modeling from the woodcuts of illustrated papers. At the suggestion of the vicar of Hartington, he executed in alabaster a group of a warrior and a dead horse. This was brought to the notice of Alexander Beresford-Hope, on whose estate Redfern was born. Hope sent him to Paris to study for six months.

== Career ==
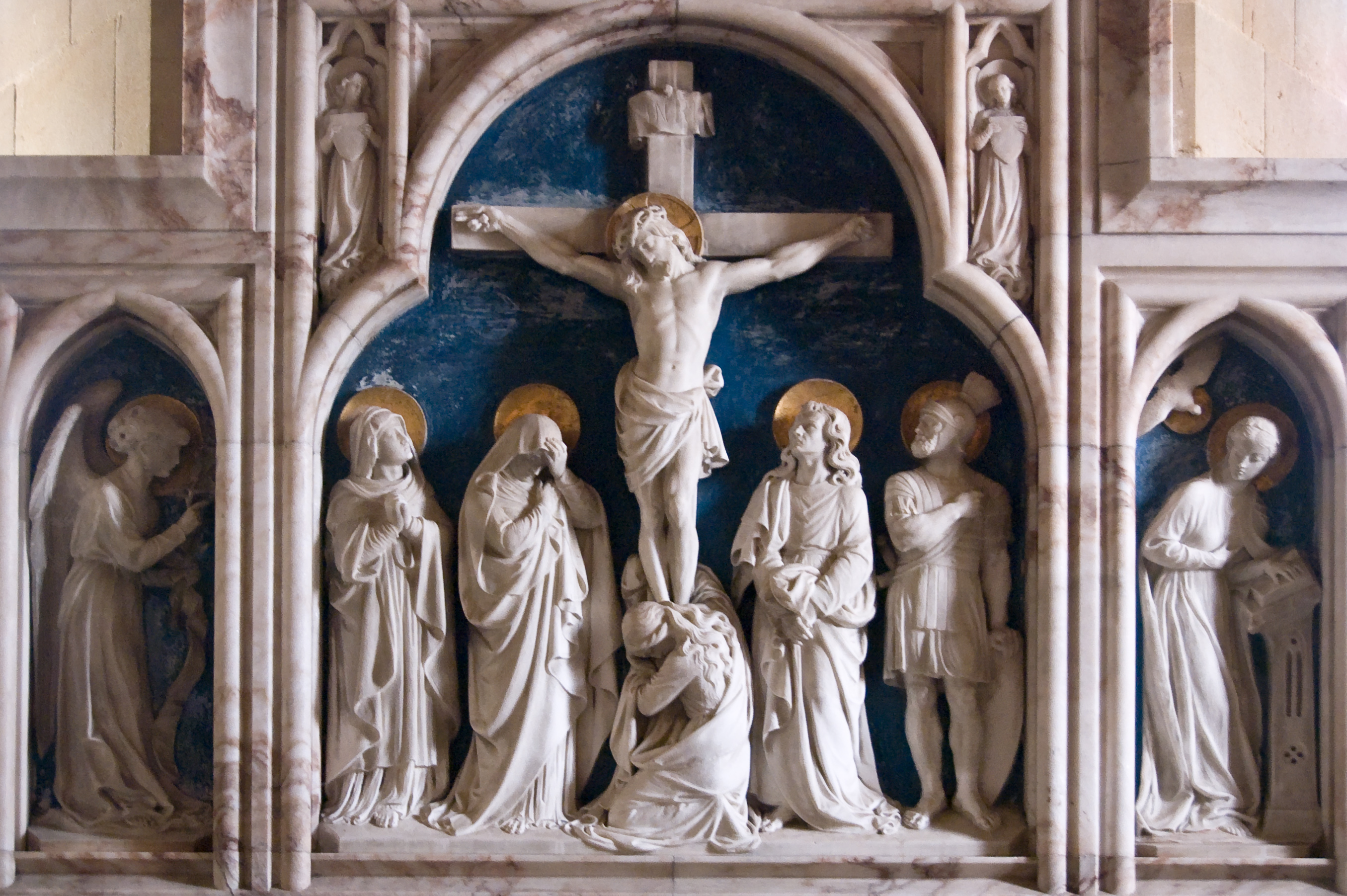
Kirby Grindalythe

His first work exhibited at the Royal Academy, Cain and Abel (1859), attracted the notice of John Henry Foley. He exhibited a Holy Family in 1861, The Good Samaritan in 1863, and other subjects almost every year until his death. These were at first chiefly of a sacred character. He later also executed portrait statues. His larger works were principally designed for Gothic church decoration.

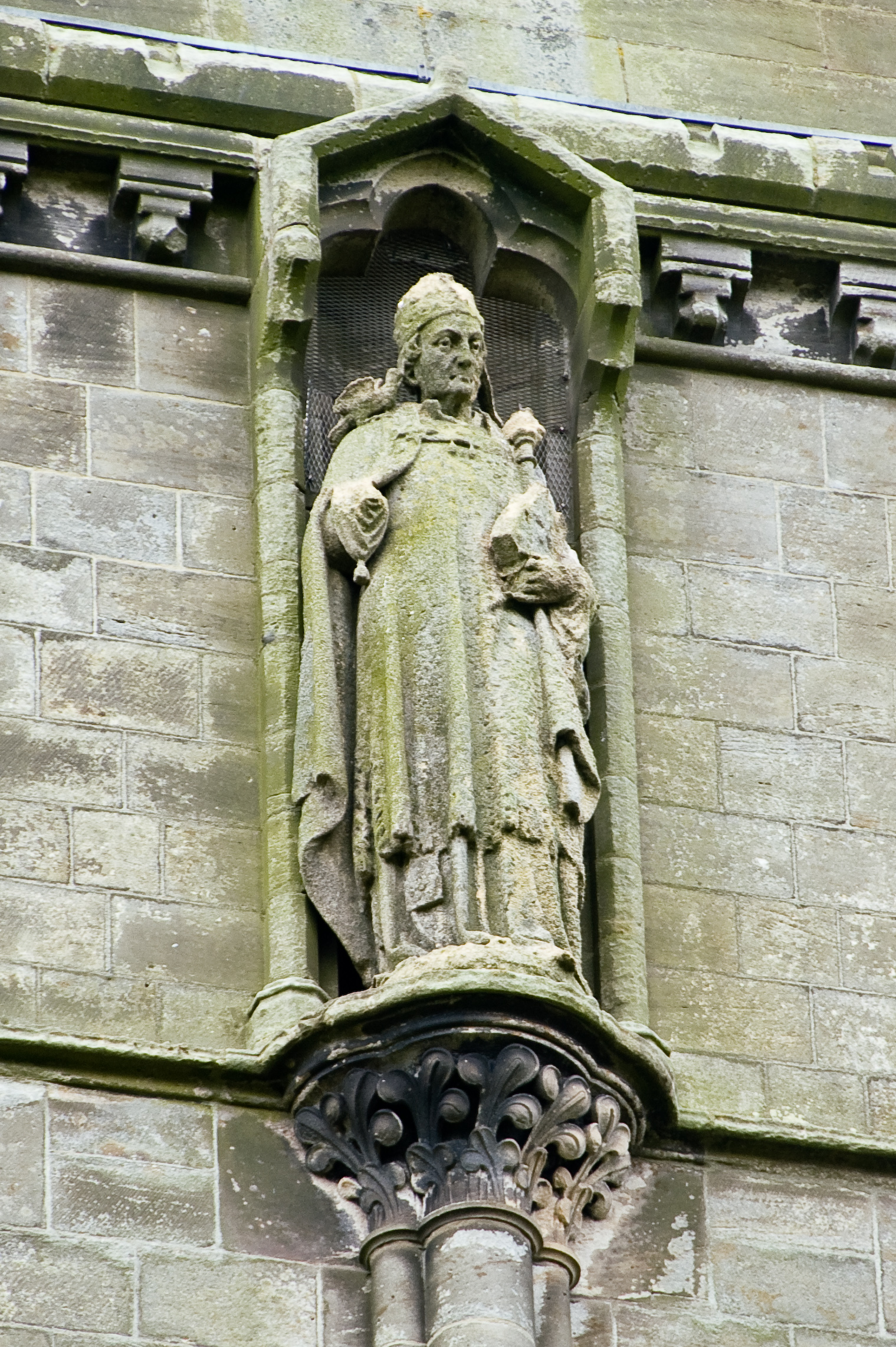
Statue from East Heslerton church

Redfern completed a commission of sculptures of the four saintly fathers of the Latin Church, St Augustine, St Ambrose, St Gregory and St Jerome. These were originally intended for the northern porch of Bristol Cathedral but were thought too "papist" by the Dean and rejected. They were rescued by George Edmund Street and included in his design for Saint Andrew's church at East Heslerton in North Yorkshire.

== Significant works ==
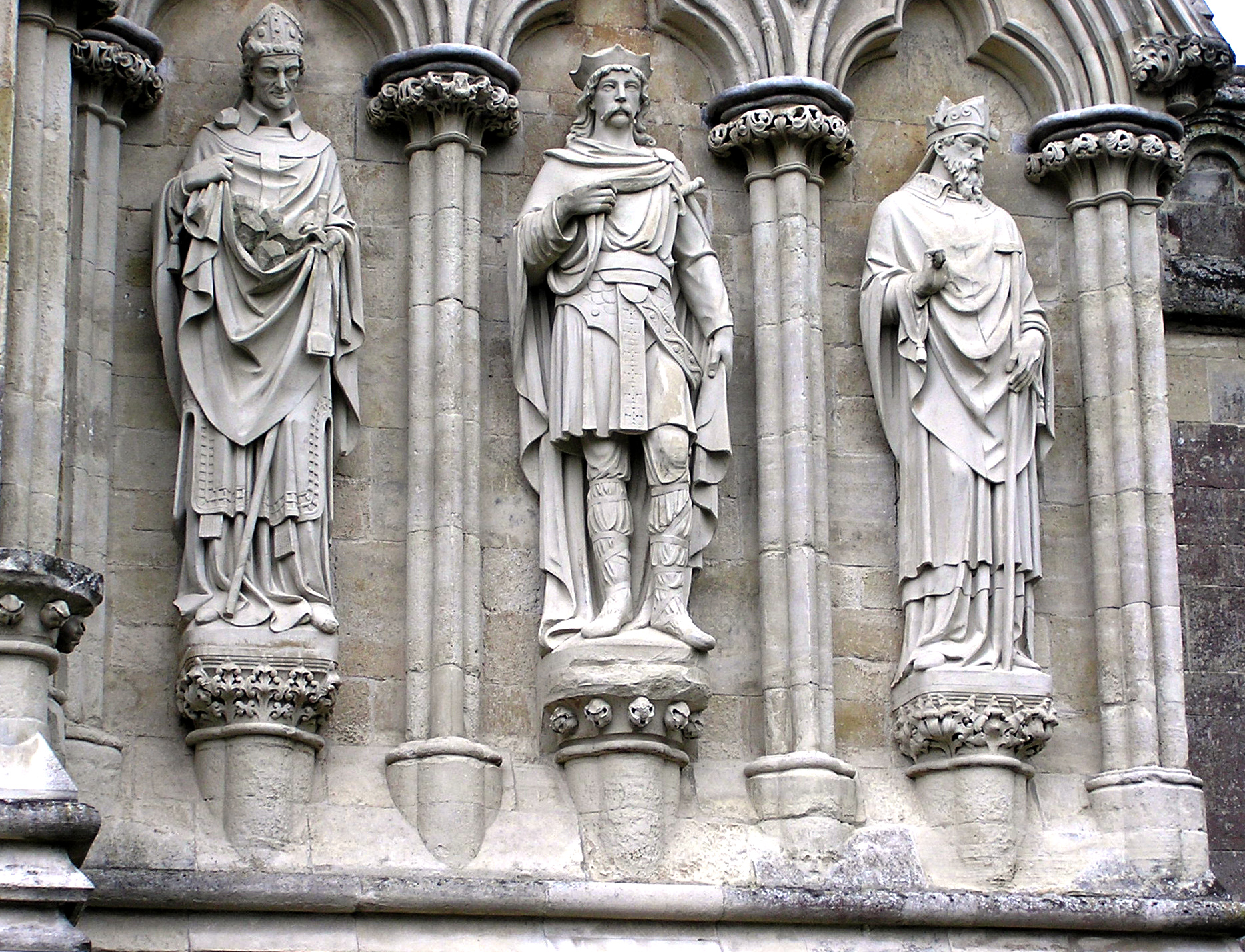
Statues on the west front of Salisbury Cathedral

Among his works are 60 statues on the west front of Salisbury Cathedral; the statues of the Apostles at Ely; groups of figures on the reredos and statues of saints in the south porch at Gloucester Cathedral; Our Lord in majesty in the chapter-house at Westminster; an elaborate reredos, representing the crucifixion, with the martyrdoms of St. Peter and St. Andrew, in St. Andrew's Church, Wells Street; the entombment in the Digby mortuary chapel, Sherborne; and Expulsion from Eden at St Leonard's Church, Bridgnorth in Shropshire.

He also carved the four Christian and four moral virtues including Fortitude on the Albert Memorial in Kensington Gardens. He was the youngest sculptor employed and he was personally chosen by Scott. After Redfern's death it was said that his original statues were of a higher quality than their eventual metal realizations which were created by Francis Skidmore of Coventry. He also created the statue of the Duke of Devonshire in front of the laboratory at Cambridge.

Redfern died at Hampstead on 13 June 1876, in the midst of a promising career.
