= Listed buildings in Ganton =

Ganton is a civil parish in the county of North Yorkshire, England. It contains seven listed buildings that are recorded in the National Heritage List for England. Of these, one is listed at Grade II*, the middle of the three grades, and the others are at Grade II, the lowest grade. The parish contains the village of Garton and the surrounding countryside. The listed buildings consist of a church, a country house and associated structures, houses, cottages and outbuildings, a farmhouse and a joiner's shop.

== Key ==
Grade	Criteria
II*	Particularly important buildings of more than special interest
II	Buildings of national importance and special interest

== Buildings ==
Name and location	Photograph	Date	Notes	Grade
St Nicholas' Church; 54.18464°N 0.48458°W		13th century	The church dates mainly from the 14th century, with the tower and south porch added in the 15th century, the chancel was rebuilt in 1843, and the church was restored in 1860. It is built in sandstone, the main roof is in stone slate, and the roof of the porch is in stone slab, and the church is in Perpendicular style. It consists of a nave, a north aisle, a south porch, a south transept, a chancel with a north chapel, and a west steeple. The steeple has a tower with two stages on a plinth, diagonal buttresses, a three-light west window with a pointed head, a southeast stair turret, clock faces on the north and west sides, a string course, bell openings with hood moulds, and a corbel table with masks, fleurons and grotesques. At the top is an embattled parapet and a recessed octagonal spire. Above the porch is a heraldic shield with a coat of arms.	II*
Manor Farmhouse; 54.17750°N 0.50016°W	—	Early 18th century	The farmhouse is in chalkstone with brick dressings, brick cladding at the rear, and it has a pantile roof. There are two storeys, a front range of three bays, and a lower rear extension on the left. On the front is a central porch and doorway, and the windows are sashes with segmental-arched lintels. Elsewhere, most of the windows are horizontally-sliding sashes.	II
26 and 28 Main Street and outbuilding 54.18455°N 0.48627°W	—	Mid to late 18th century	A house and a cottage in chalkstone, the extension in brick, and all whitewashed, with a cogged brick eaves course, and a pantile roof. There are two low storeys, four bays, and a lean-to outbuilding on the left. On the front are two doorways, the left with a timber lintel, and the right with a segmental head. There is one window with a fixed light, and the others are horizontally-sliding sashes.	II
Garden Walls and Vine House; 54.18297°N 0.48256°W	—	Late 18th century	The walls enclosing the garden are in red brick with sandstone coping. The northeast wall has full-height buttresses, and contains heating flues. The northwest wall contains a large lean-to vine house, with a slightly projecting gabled entrance.	II
2 and 3 Duck Lane and outbuilding 54.18697°N 0.48816°W	—	Early 19th century	The house, cottage and attached former cowhouse are in whitewashed chalkstone on a brick plinth, with a pantile roof. There are two storeys, three bays, and an outbuilding to the right. On the front are two doorways, No. 2 has horizontally-sliding sash windows. and the windows in No. 3 are modern. The ground floor openings have segmental-arched heads.	II
Joiner's shop 54.18710°N 0.48805°W	—	Early 19th century	The building is in chalkstone, with sandstone quoins and brick dressings, on a brick plinth, with a pantile roof. There is one storey and one wide bay. It contains an elliptical-arched opening, in the left return is a segmental-arched louvred window, and in the gable end is a lifting door.	II
Ganton Hall; 54.17981°N 0.48158°W		c. 1860	A country house in red brick on a chamfered plinth, with stone dressings, quoins, a narrow floor band, a moulded eaves band, and slate roofs with shaped gables. The windows throughout are sashes. There are two storeys and attics, and an H-shaped plan, and a lower service wing with one storey and an attic. The southeast front has five bays, a recessed centre flanked by two-storey canted bay window, and gabled dormers. The southwest front has three bays and contains a canted and a square two-storey bay window. The northwest entrance front has five irregular bays, and contains a porch with coupled Doric columns, an entablature, and a plain parapet.	II
