= All Saints' Church, West Heslerton =

Anglican church in Yorkshire, England

Coordinates: 54°10′13″N 0°36′20″W

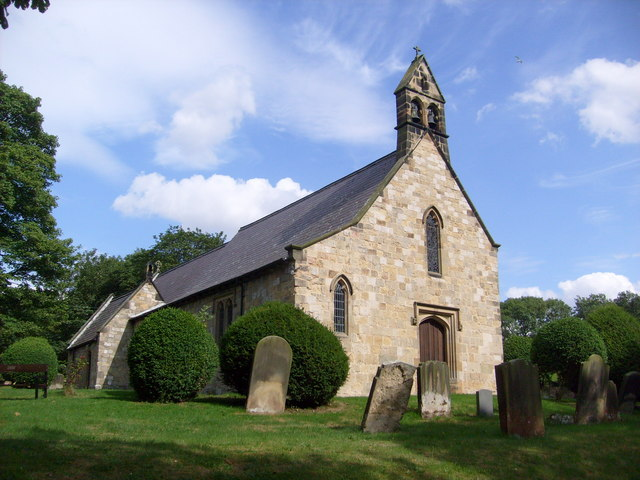
The church, in 2010

All Saints' Church is the parish church of West Heslerton, a village in North Yorkshire, in England.

The church was built in the 13th century, and was formerly dedicated to Saint Andrew. In 1848, it was described as a "neat structure". The chancel was partly rebuilt in 1859. In 1886, C. Hodgson Fowler heavily restored the building, and most of the structure is now his work, with little other than the chancel surviving from earlier periods. The church was grade II listed in 1966.

The church is built of sandstone with slate roofs, and consists of a nave, a north aisle, a chancel and a vestry. On the west gable is a bellcote, and there is a cross on the east gable. The north side of the chancel has two early lancet windows, and two of the three on its south side are also original. The east window, rebuilt by Fowler, has three stepped lancets and stained glass by Charles Eamer Kempe. Other stained glass is by Clayton and Bell, and the west window is by Rosemary Rutherford. There is also an original doorway in the north wall, originally to the outside, later to the vestry, but now blocked. Inside, there is an Easter Sepulchre dating from about 1300, an octagonal font probably designed by William Butterfield, a piscina and several memorials.

== See also ==
- Listed buildings in Heslerton
