= Wintringham, North Yorkshire =

Village and civil parish in North Yorkshire, England

Coordinates: 54.14563°N 0.64848°W

Wintringham
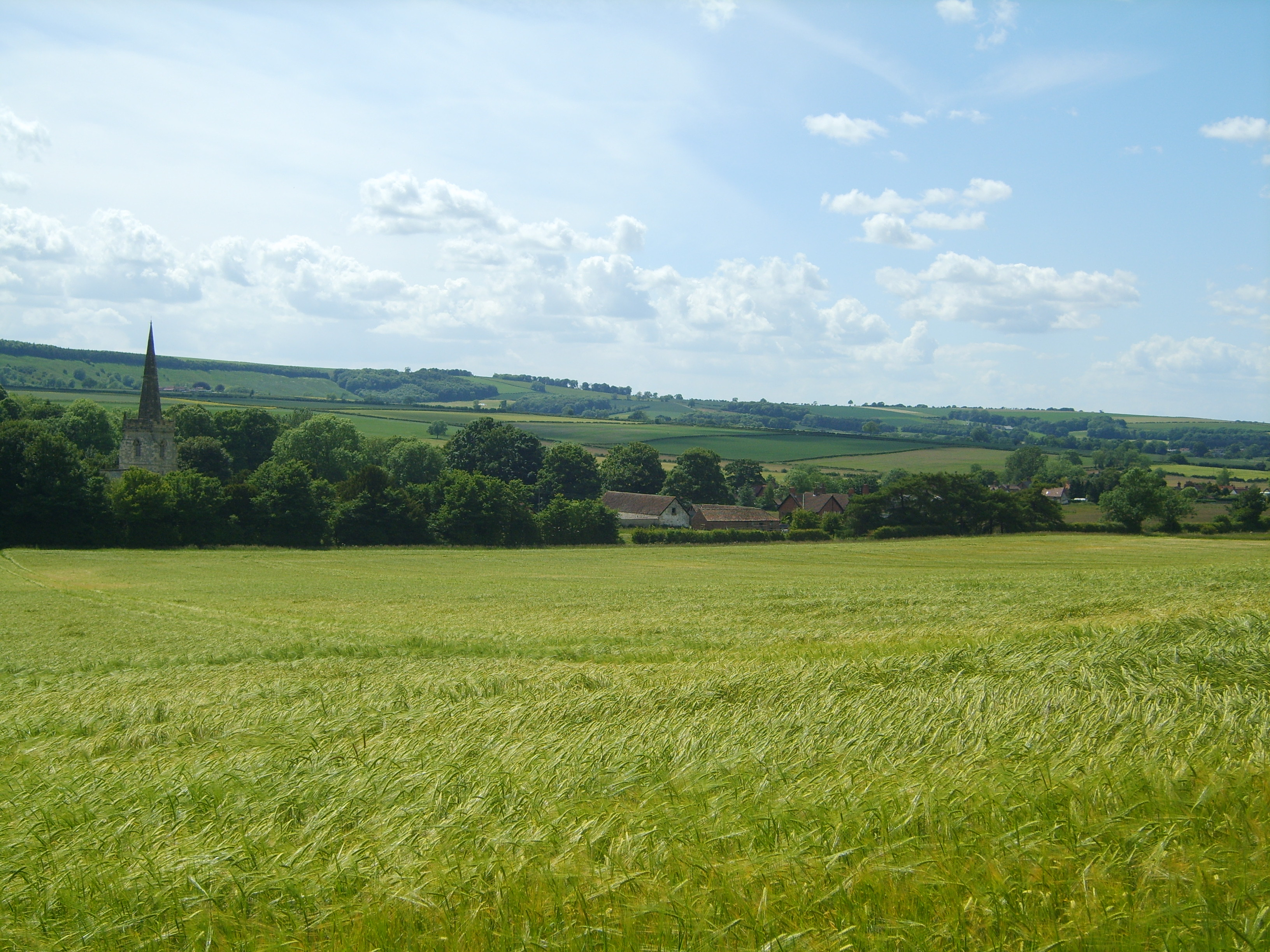

- Location within North Yorkshire
- Population: 204 (2011 census)
- OS grid reference: SE883730
- Unitary authority: North Yorkshire
- Ceremonial county: North Yorkshire
- Region: Yorkshire and the Humber
- Country: England
- Sovereign state: United Kingdom
- Post town: MALTON
- Postcode district: YO17
- Police: North Yorkshire
- Fire: North Yorkshire
- Ambulance: Yorkshire
- UK Parliament: Thirsk and Malton

Wintringham is a village and civil parish in North Yorkshire, England. The village is near the A64 road and 6 miles (9.7 km) east of Malton.

Two long-distance footpaths, the Yorkshire Wolds Way National Trail and the Centenary Way, pass through. The former Anglican parish church of St Peter's is located in the village. It has been redundant as a church since 2004.

== History ==
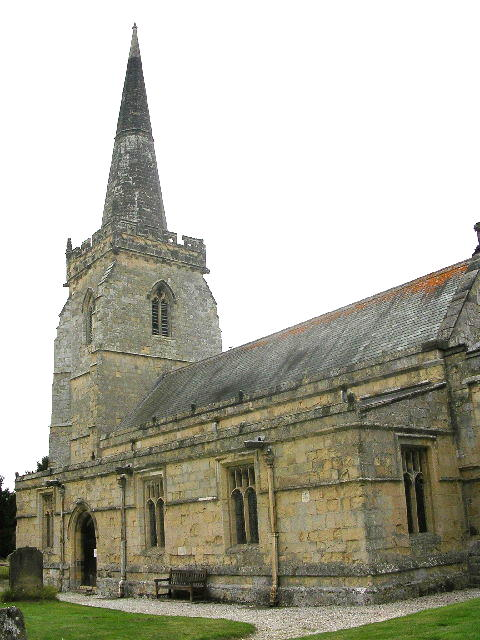
Church of St Peter, Wintringham

The settlement is mentioned in the Domesday Book as being worth £2 and belonging to Ranulph de Mortimer, who also owned lands in Herefordshire and Shropshire. The name derives from Old English as the hām (village or homestead) of Winteringas [people]. It shares the same derivation as Winteringham and Winterton in Lincolnshire.

The parish grew up as the estate villages of the nearby Place Newton estate, which covers 7,000 acres (2,800 ha), and lies just to the south of Wintringham. Improvements to the estate in the early part of the 20th century included replacing all the thatched roofs in Wintringham with tiles, and the planting of 350 acres (140 ha) of woodland.

The Church of St Peter in the village was built between the 12th and 15th centuries. Pevsner described it as "..the most rewarding church in the East Riding.." It was declared redundant in 2004, and is maintained by the Churches Conservation Trust. A Wesleyan chapel was built in the village in 1834, but was converted into a garage showroom in the 1960s.

In the 1950s, one of the Ham-class Royal Navy minesweepers was named after the village.

Two long-distance footpaths pass through the village – the Centenary Way, and the Yorkshire Wolds Way. The nearest railway station was at Rillington, almost 4 miles (6.4 km) to the north on the York–Scarborough line. The nearest open railway station is at Malton, some 7 miles (11 km) to the west.

Land to the west of the village that borders Wintringham Beck, was designated as an SSSI in 1975. Wintringham Marsh was cited because of the quality of its plants and the uniformity of their graduation from dry land to marshland. In the year 2000, a small pond was built between the marsh and the village to celebrate the Millennium.

== Governance ==
Wintringham was part of the wapentake of Buckrose in the East Riding of Yorkshire. It was transferred to North Yorkshire in 1974, and between 1974 and 2023 the village was part of the Ryedale district. It is now administered by North Yorkshire Council.

== Notable people ==
The deserted hamlet of Linton, to the south-east, was the probable birthplace of Lady Margaret Hoby, author of the earliest extant diary of a woman in English.

== See also ==
- Listed buildings in Wintringham, North Yorkshire
