= Roger Weatherby =

English businessman

- Born: August 6, 1962 (age 63); Oxford, United Kingdom
- Education: London Business School
- Occupation: Businessman
- Known for: Chairman of Weatherbys Banking Group
- Spouse: Semantha Weatherby
- Children: 4
- Parent(s): Alison and Christopher Weatherby

Roger Weatherby is an English businessman and the chairman of Weatherbys Banking Group, a private financial services company. He is part of the seventh generation of the Weatherby family, known for its involvement in horseracing.

== Early life ==
Born on August 6, 1962, in Oxford, Roger Weatherby is the son of Alison and Christopher Weatherby. He grew up on a farm in Whaddon, Buckinghamshire. His father, Christopher Weatherby, served as a Major in WWII and later became Chairman of Weatherbys in 1973.

Roger is married to Semantha, they have four children and live on a farm in Leicestershire.

== Education and career ==
Roger attended Eton College and later trained at The Royal Military Academy Sandhurst. He served in The 15th/19th The King's Royal Hussars from 1982 to 1985, including postings in Germany and Cyprus. Before his military service, he supported research projects in Southern Africa.

After leaving the Army, Weatherby worked as an institutional equity salesman at Cazenove & Co in London, Sydney, and New York. He later pursued a master's degree in finance at London Business School and joined Weatherbys in 1997 as finance director, eventually becoming CEO of the banking group in 2000.

Weatherby was the inaugural chairman of Arkle Finance and Weatherbys Hamilton. He received the Spears’ Outstanding Achievement Award in 2019.

== Other activities ==
Weatherby has a strong interest in horseracing, art, philanthropy, and sustainability. He served as Steward and Senior Steward of The Jockey Club and was Chairman of Racing Welfare. He has participated in several high-profile fundraising efforts, including an expedition to the South Pole and multiple marathons.
