= HMS Wintringham =

Minesweeper of the Royal Navy

History

United Kingdom
- Name: HMS Wintringham
- Namesake: Wintringham
- Builder: J. Samuel White
- Launched: 24 May 1955
- Completed: 8 December 1955
- Fate: Transferred to Australia in 1967
- Notes: Pennant number(s): M2777 / IMS77

Australia
- Name: HMAS Seal
- Acquired: 1966
- Commissioned: 1968
- Decommissioned: 1988
- Fate: Sold into civilian service in 1988 and renamed to TSMV Seal.

General characteristics
- Class & type: Ham-class minesweeper

HMS Wintringham (M2777/IMS77) was a Ham-class minesweeper for the Royal Navy. Their names were all chosen from villages ending in -ham. The minesweeper was named after Wintringham.

She remained in operational reserve in a land cradle at Rosneath on the Clyde until 1963. She was transferred to the Royal Australian Navy on 9 June 1966, arriving in Sydney as deck cargo on the merchant ship Gladstone Star on 29 July 1968. She was converted into a diving tender by Halvorsens, renamed HMAS Seal (DTV1001/Y298) and entered service in December 1968.

Seal was decommissioned in 1988, sold into civilian service on 29 November 1989, and converted into the corporate luxury yacht TSMV Seal. Seal was holed while at sea off the Western Australian coast and was then purposely run aground at Hidden Island, Western Australia on 1 May 2003.
