= Ganton =

Village and civil parish in North Yorkshire, England

Coordinates: 54°11′05″N 0°29′10″W

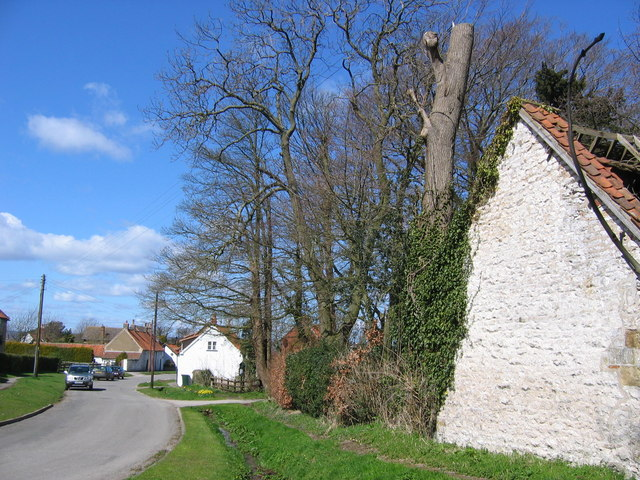
- Ganton, looking NW along Main Street

- Location within North Yorkshire
- Population: 215 (2011 census)
- OS grid reference: SE988776
  - London: 185 mi (298 km) S
- Civil parish: Ganton
- Unitary authority: North Yorkshire
- Ceremonial county: North Yorkshire
- Region: Yorkshire and the Humber
- Country: England
- Sovereign state: United Kingdom
- Post town: SCARBOROUGH
- Postcode district: YO12
- Police: North Yorkshire
- Fire: North Yorkshire
- Ambulance: Yorkshire
- UK Parliament: Thirsk and Malton

Ganton is a village and civil parish in North Yorkshire, England. It is situated on the south side of the Vale of Pickering immediately north of the Yorkshire Wolds. Ganton lies 7 miles (11 km) west of the coastal town of Filey, and 9 miles (14 km) south-west of Scarborough.

The village appears in the Domesday Book and its name is thought to mean 'Galma's farmstead'.

It was historically part of the East Riding of Yorkshire until 1974. Between 1974 and 2023 it was part of the Ryedale district. It is now administered by North Yorkshire Council.

Ganton is situated on the Yorkshire Wolds Way National Trail and Centenary Way, long-distance footpaths. Its most notable landmark is its golf course. The Ganton Golf Club has hosted the Ryder Cup matches in 1949, The Amateur Championship three times, in 1964, 1977 and 1991, and the Walker Cup in 2003.

The Grade II listed Ganton Hall is the family seat of the investment banker and businessman Nicholas Wrigley.

St Nicholas' Church, Ganton on Main Street is a 13th-15th century building and is Grade II* listed.

The small village of Potter Brompton lies at the western end of the parish.

Ganton Cricket Club field two teams in the Scarborough Beckett Cricket League. Ganton cricket team plays at the ground overlooking the A64 next to the village hall.

== History ==
From 1845 to 1930, the village was served by Ganton station on the York to Scarborough railway line. An 18th-century coaching inn at the centre of the village has since been converted to a public house with bed and breakfast.

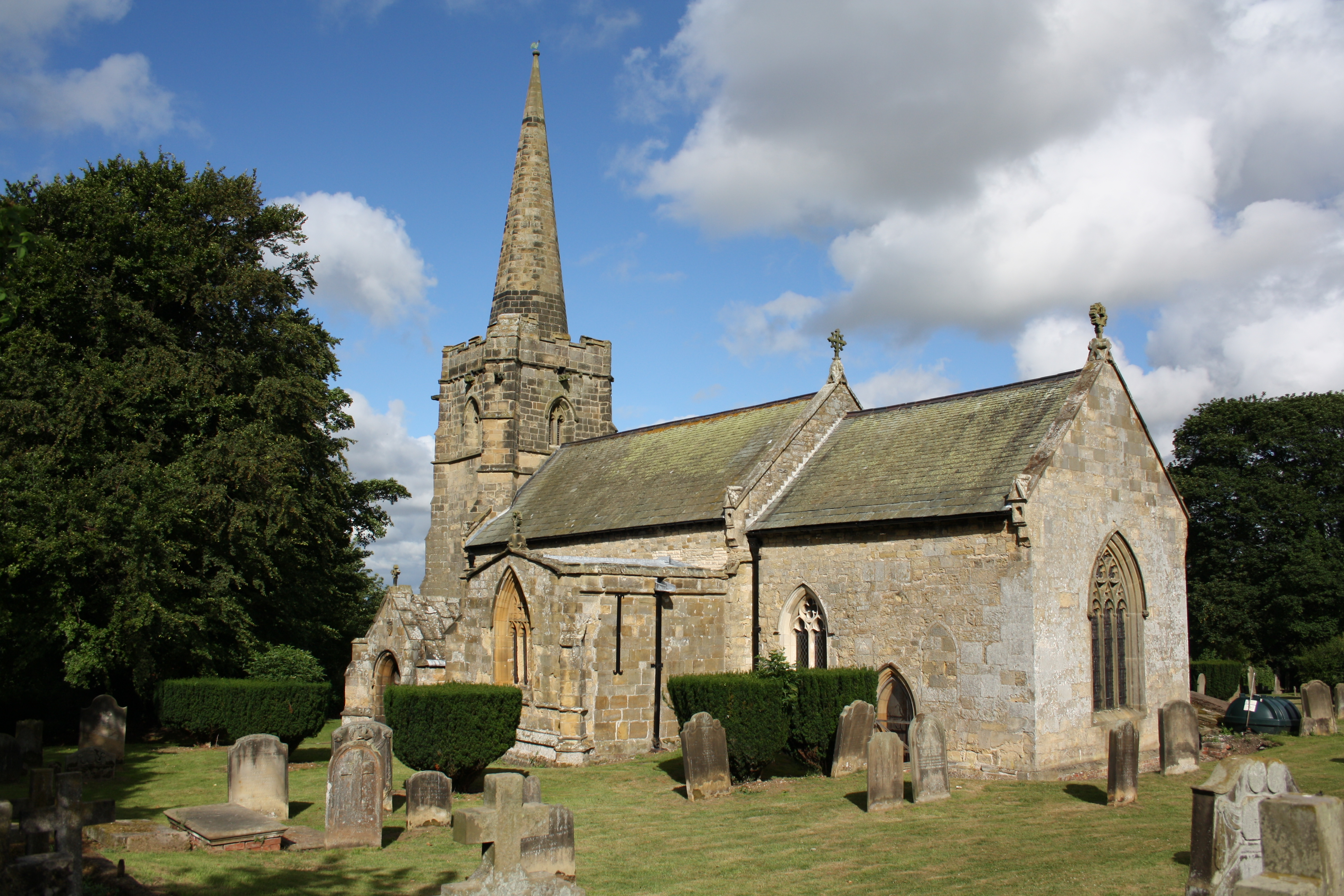
St Nicholas Church

In 1823 Ganton was a parish in the East Riding of Yorkshire and the Wapentake of Dickering. The church of St Nicholas was under the patronage of the local Legard baronets. Population at the time was 278, which included the nearby settlement of Potter Brompton. Occupations included three farmers, two carpenters, a gardener, a stone mason, a tailor, a licensed victualler & blacksmith, a druggist & gun maker, and a machine maker. There was a schoolmaster, a vicar, a curate, and Sir Thomas Legard of Ganton Hall. Two carriers operated between the village and Beverley and Driffield twice weekly. To the south-west of Ganton was the settlement of Ganton Dale Inn, which contained a public house that was also a post house.

== See also ==
- Listed buildings in Ganton
