= Potter Brompton =

Village in North Yorkshire, England

Coordinates: 54.17946°N 0.50167°W

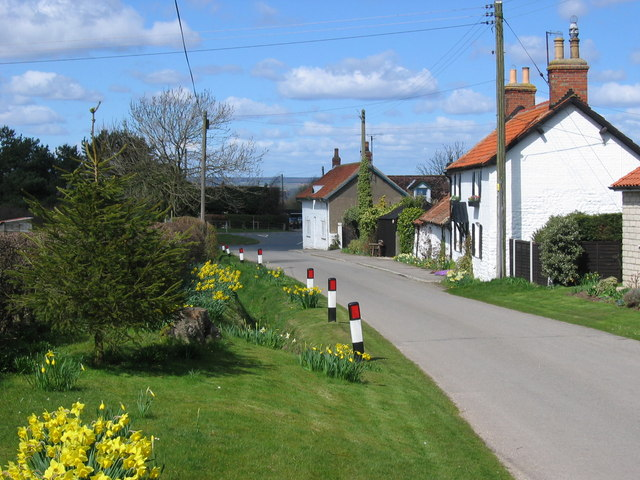
- Potter Brompton

- Location within North Yorkshire
- OS grid reference: SE978769
- Unitary authority: North Yorkshire
- Ceremonial county: North Yorkshire
- Region: Yorkshire and the Humber
- Country: England
- Sovereign state: United Kingdom
- Post town: SCARBOROUGH
- Postcode district: YO12
- Dialling code: 01944
- Police: North Yorkshire
- Fire: North Yorkshire
- Ambulance: Yorkshire
- UK Parliament: Thirsk and Malton

Potter Brompton is a small village in the English county of North Yorkshire, on the A64 road from Malton to Scarborough. The village is situated just a few hundred yards off the Yorkshire Wolds Way National Trail and lies within the parish of Ganton. The population statistics for the village area included in those for the whole parish of Ganton.

It was historically part of the East Riding of Yorkshire until 1974. The village was part of the Ryedale district between 1974 and 2023. It is now administered by North Yorkshire Council.

Potter Brompton is mentioned in the Domesday Book as having 29 ploughlands, but no villagers. The land originally belonged to Earl Morcar, but after the Conquest, the land was forfeited to William the Conqueror.

The village is well served by public transport; it has an hourly bus service through the day on the Yorkshire Coastliner route between Leeds, York, Malton and Scarborough.
