= Yorkshire Wolds Way =

Long-distance footpath in northern England

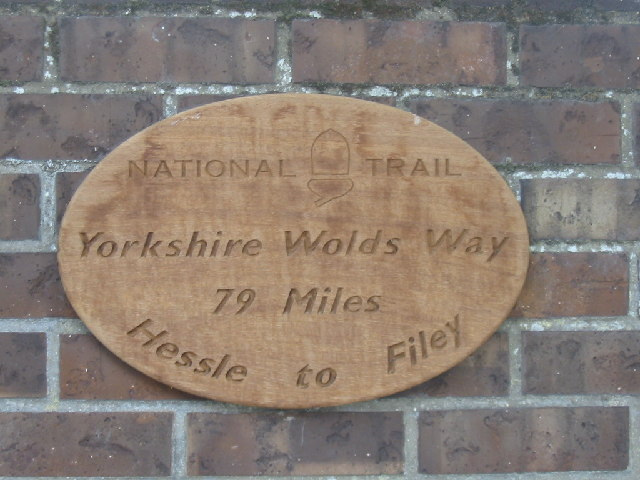
- Yorkshire Wolds Way sign at Market Weighton
- Length: 79 mi (127 km)
- Location: Yorkshire, England
- Designation: UK National Trail
- Trailheads: Hessle, East Riding of Yorkshire; 53.724°N 0.436°W; Filey, North Yorkshire; 54.210°N 0.292°W
- Use: Hiking
- Season: All year

The Yorkshire Wolds Way is a National Trail in Yorkshire, England. It runs for 79 miles (127 km) from Hessle to Filey, around the Yorkshire Wolds. At Filey Brigg, it connects with the Cleveland Way, another National Trail. It officially opened on 2 October 1982.

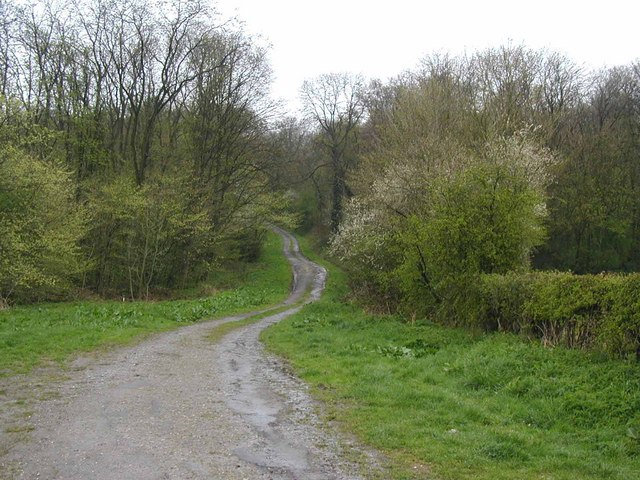
Yorkshire Wolds Way through Bratt Wood, Nunburnholme

== Route ==
Common stops along the Yorkshire Wolds Way

The route of the Yorkshire Wolds Way passes close to or through the following places:

- Hessle
- North Ferriby
- Melton
- Welton
- Brantingham
- South Cave
- North Newbald
- Goodmanham
- Market Weighton
- Londesborough
- Nunburnholme
- Pocklington
- Millington
- Huggate
- Fridaythorpe
- Thixendale
- Wharram Percy
- Wharram le Street
- Wintringham
- Sherburn
- Potter Brompton
- Ganton
- Muston
- Filey

Places in italics are slightly off the main route.

== History ==
Proposals were first put forward by the East Yorkshire and Derwent branch of the Ramblers Association in 1967. While initial approval was granted within a year, the trail was not officially established until 1982.

Yorkshire Wolds Way, a 2017 two-part BBC television documentary, features a journey along the Yorkshire Wolds Way. Presenter Paul Rose describes the trail as "arguably Britain's least well-known national walking trail". The documentary was first broadcast in January 2017.

== Races ==
The Hardmoors Race Series features ultramarathons based on the Yorkshire Wolds Way and Cleveland Way. Included in the series is the Hardwolds 80-mile race comprising the entire length of the Yorkshire Wolds Way.

== See also ==
- Long-distance footpaths in the UK
