= Diocese of York =

Diocese of the Church of England

Coordinates: 53°57′43″N 1°4′55″W

Diocese of York Dioecesis Eboracensis
- Coat of arms

- Flag

Location
- Ecclesiastical province: York
- Archdeaconries: Cleveland, the East Riding, York

Statistics
- Parishes: 472
- Churches: 607

Information
- Cathedral: York Minster
- Language: English

Current leadership
- Bishop: Stephen Cottrell, Archbishop of York
- Suffragans: Eleanor Sanderson, Bishop of Hull; Stephen Race, Bishop of Beverley (AEO); Barry Hill, Bishop of Whitby; Flora Winfield, Bishop of Selby
- Archdeacons: Andy Broom, Archdeacon of the East Riding; Amanda Bloor, Archdeacon of Cleveland; Archdeacon of York (vacancy)

Website
- dioceseofyork.org.uk

The Diocese of York is an administrative division of the Church of England, part of the Province of York. It covers the city of York, the eastern part of North Yorkshire, and most of the East Riding of Yorkshire.

The diocese is headed by the archbishop of York and its cathedral is York Minster. The diocese is divided into three archdeaconries of Cleveland in the north (with a Bishop of Whitby), the East Riding (with a Bishop of Hull), and in the south-west the Archdeaconry of York (with a bishop of Selby).

The diocese was once much larger, covering Yorkshire, Nottinghamshire and Derbyshire and parts of Northumberland, Lancashire, Cumberland and Westmorland.

== Bishops ==
The diocesan archbishop of York (currently Stephen Cottrell) is primarily supported by three suffragan bishops: the bishop of Hull (founded 1891; currently Eleanor Sanderson), the bishop of Whitby (founded 1923; currently Barry Hill) and the bishop of Selby (founded 1939; currently Flora Winfield). While not operating a formal area scheme, each suffragan takes informal responsibility for one archdeaconry (East Riding, Cleveland and York respectively). Alternative episcopal oversight (for parishes in the diocese who reject the ministry of priests who are women) is provided by the provincial episcopal visitor (PEV) the bishop suffragan of Beverley (currently Stephen Race); unlike in most dioceses, Beverley does not need to be licensed as an honorary assistant bishop since he is a suffragan in the diocese.

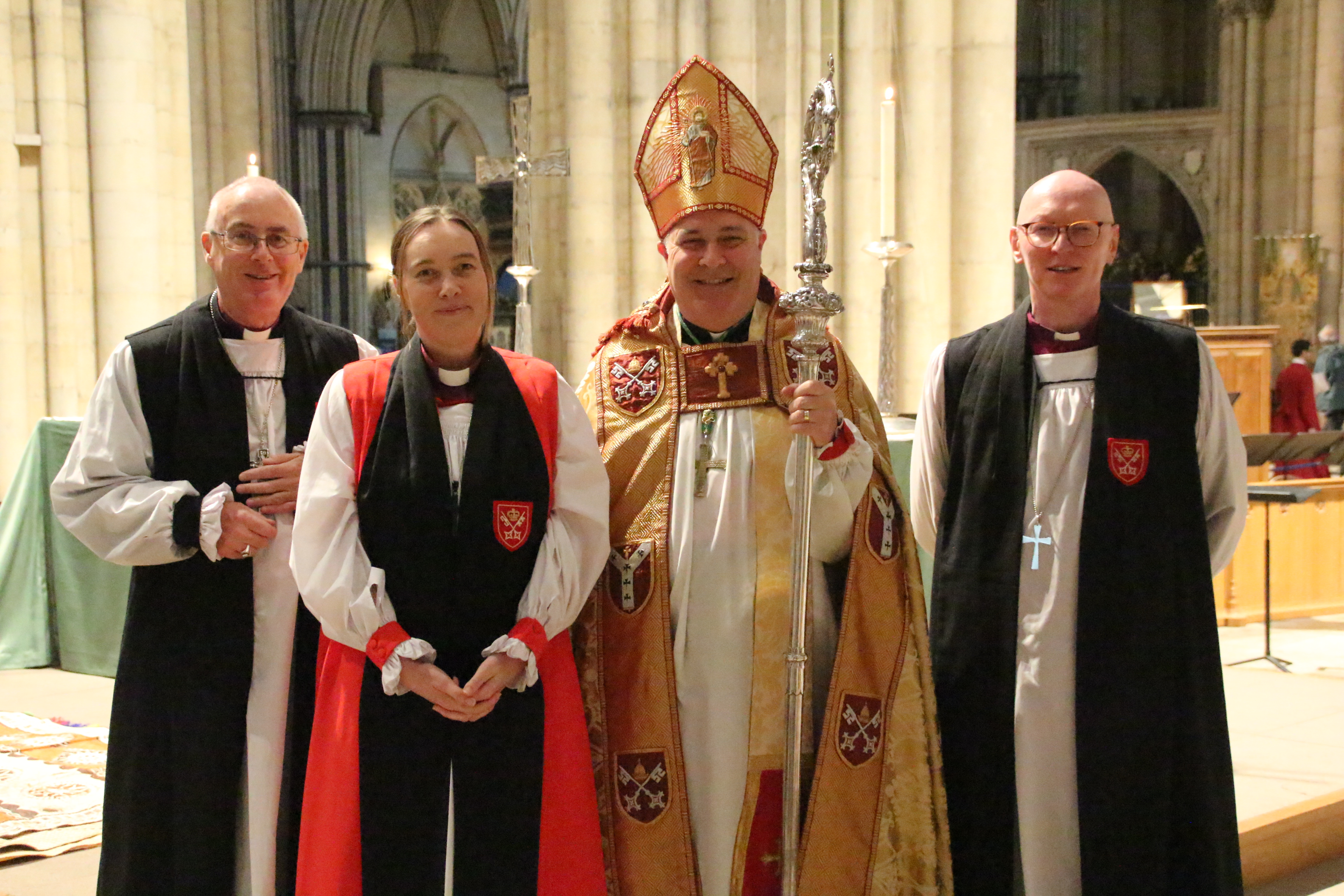
Bishops of the Diocese of York in 2022, L to R: Ferguson, Sanderson, Cottrell, and Thomson

David James, retired bishop of Bradford and Martin Wallace, retired bishop suffragan of Selby, live in Beverley and Bridlington respectively, but there is no evidence that either has been licensed as an honorary assistant bishop.

== History ==
In 1541, the archdeanery of Richmond, North Yorkshire, which included part of the Yorkshire Dales, North Lancashire (including Furness), the southern part of Westmorland and the ward of Allerdale above Derwent in Cumberland, became part of the new Diocese of Chester. (These areas later became parts of other dioceses.)

From the reign of Henry I to 1572 the liberty or county palatine of Hexhamshire was part of the diocese and also the archbishop was the lord palatine of the county. In 1572 the county palatine was abolished and transferred to Northumberland and the Diocese of Durham.

In 1836 the western part (corresponding broadly to the West Riding) was split into the Ripon diocese, which was later subdivided into the dioceses of Ripon and Leeds, Bradford, and Wakefield and now constitutes most of the Diocese of Leeds. In 1884 Nottinghamshire and Derbyshire became part of the new Diocese of Southwell, from which Derbyshire was split off again in 1927 to form the Diocese of Derby. In 1914 the Diocese of Sheffield (covering South Yorkshire) was split off as an independent diocese.

== Archdeacon for Generous Giving and Stewardship ==
David Butterfield resigned as archdeacon of the East Riding on 26 May 2014 in order to be collated as "Archdeacon for Generous Giving and Stewardship" that 23 June, a position he held until he retired on 1 July 2017.

== Archdeaconries and deaneries ==
Diocese	Archdeaconries	Rural Deaneries
Diocese of York	Archdeaconry of York	Deanery of New Ainsty
Diocese of York	Archdeaconry of York	Deanery of Derwent
Diocese of York	Archdeaconry of York	Deanery of Easingwold
Diocese of York	Archdeaconry of York	Deanery of Selby
Diocese of York	Archdeaconry of York	Deanery of South Wold
Diocese of York	Archdeaconry of York	Deanery of Southern Ryedale
Diocese of York	Archdeaconry of York	Deanery of City of York
Diocese of York	Archdeaconry of Cleveland	Deanery of Guisborough
Diocese of York	Archdeaconry of Cleveland	Deanery of Middlesbrough
Diocese of York	Archdeaconry of Cleveland	Deanery of Mowbray
Diocese of York	Archdeaconry of Cleveland	Deanery of Northern Ryedale
Diocese of York	Archdeaconry of Cleveland	Deanery of Stokesley
Diocese of York	Archdeaconry of Cleveland	Deanery of Whitby
Diocese of York	Archdeaconry of the East Riding	Deanery of Beverley
Diocese of York	Archdeaconry of the East Riding	Deanery of Bridlington
Diocese of York	Archdeaconry of the East Riding	Deanery of Hull
Diocese of York	Archdeaconry of the East Riding	Deanery of Harthill
Diocese of York	Archdeaconry of the East Riding	Deanery of North Holderness
Diocese of York	Archdeaconry of the East Riding	Deanery of South Holderness
Diocese of York	Archdeaconry of the East Riding	Diocese of York#/editor/all
Diocese of York	Archdeaconry of the East Riding	Deanery of Scarborough

From 1972 to 2017 the Deanery of Hull was, unusually, sub-divided into three Area Deaneries of Central and North Hull, East Hull, and West Hull.

== Churches ==
- Aberford: St Ricarius
- Acaster Malbis: Holy Trinity
- Acaster Selby: St John
- Acklam: St John the Baptist
- Aislaby: St Margaret
- Aldbrough: St Bartholomew
- Aldwark: St Stephen
- Allerston: St John
- Allerthorpe: St Botolph
- Alne: St Mary
- Amotherby: St Helen
- Ampleforth: St Hilda
- Appleton-le-Moors: Christ Church
- Appleton-le-Street: All Saints
- Appleton Roebuck: All Saints
- Askham Bryan: St Nicholas
- Askham Richard: St Mary
- Atwick: St Lawrence
- Aughton: All Saints
- Bagby: St Mary
- Bainton: St Andrew
- Baldersby: Mission Room
- Baldersby St James: St James
- Barkston Ash: Holy Trinity
- Barlby: All Saints
- Barmby Moor: St Catherine
- Barmston: All Saints
- Barton-le-Street: St Michael
- Beadlam: St Hilda
- Beeford: St Leonard
- Bempton: St Michael
- Bessingby: St Magnus
- Beswick: St Margaret
- Beverley: SS John & Martin's Minster
- Beverley: St Leonard, Molescroft
- Beverley: St Mary
- Beverley: St Nicholas
- Bewholme: St John the Baptist
- Bielby: St Giles
- Bilbrough: St James
- Bilsdale Midcable: St John the Evangelist
- Bilsdale Priory: St Hilda
- Bilton-in-Ainsty: St Helen
- Bilton-in-Holderness: St Peter
- Birdsall: St Mary
- Birkin: St Mary
- Bishop Burton: All Saints
- Bishop Wilton: St Edith
- Bishopthorpe: St Andrew
- Blacktoft: Holy Trinity
- Boltby: Holy Trinity
- Bolton Percy: All Saints
- Boosbeck: St Aidan
- Bossall: St Botolph
- Boston Spa: St Mary the Virgin
- Boynton: St Andrew
- Brafferton: St Peter
- Brambles Farm, Thorntree and Netherfields: Bishop's Mission Order
- Bramham: All Saints
- Brandesburton: St Mary
- Brandsby: All Saints
- Bransdale: St Nicholas
- Brantingham: All Saints
- Brayton: St Wilfrid
- Bridlington: Christ Church, Bridlington Quay
- Bridlington: Emmanuel
- Bridlington: St Mark, Bessingby
- Bridlington: St Mary's Priory Church
- Bridlington: Holy Trinity
- Brompton: St Thomas
- Brompton-by-Sawdon: All Saints
- Broomfleet: St Mary
- Brotton: St Margaret of Antioch
- Brough: All Saints
- Brough: St Helen, Welton
- Brough: St Mary, Elloughton
- Bubwith: All Saints
- Bugthorpe: St Andrew
- Bulmer: St Martin
- Burnby: St Giles
- Bursea: Chapel
- Burton Agnes: St Martin
- Burton Fleming: St Cuthbert
- Burton Pidsea: SS Peter & Paul
- Burythorpe: All Saints
- Buttercrambe: St John the Evangelist
- Butterwick (Barton-le-Street): Holy Epiphany
- Butterwick (Foxholes): St Nicholas
- Carlin How-and-Skinningrove: St Helen
- Carlton-by-Snaith: St Mary
- Carlton-in-Cleveland: St Botolph
- Carlton Husthwaite: St Mary
- Carlton Miniott: St Lawrence
- Carnaby: St John the Baptist
- Castleton: SS Michael & George
- Catton: All Saints
- Catwick: St Michael
- Cawood: All Saints
- Cayton: St John the Baptist
- Cherry Burton: St Michael & All Angels
- Church Fenton: St Mary the Virgin
- Cliffe: St Andrew
- Clifford: St Luke
- Cloughton: St Mary
- Colton: St Paul
- Commondale: St Peter
- Coneysthorpe: Chapel
- Copmanthorpe: St Giles
- Cottingham: St Mary
- Cowesby: St Michael
- Cowlam: St Mary
- Coxwold: St Michael
- Crambe: St Michael
- Crathorne: All Saints
- Crayke: St Cuthbert
- Cropton: St Gregory
- Dalby: St Peter
- Dalton: St John the Evangelist
- Dalton Holme: St Mary
- Danby: St Hilda
- Deighton: All Saints
- Drax: SS Peter & Paul
- Dunnington (East Yorkshire): St Nicholas
- Dunnington (North Yorkshire): St Nicholas
- Easington (East Yorkshire): All Saints
- Easington (North Yorkshire): All Saints
- Easingwold: St John the Baptist & All Saints
- East Ayton: St John the Baptist
- East Cottingwith: St Mary
- East Harlsey: St Oswald
- East Rounton: St Laurence
- Eastfield: Holy Nativity
- Eastmoors: St Mary Magdalene
- Eastrington: St Michael
- Ebberston: St Mary
- Egton: St Hilda
- Ellerburn: St Hilda
- Ellerby: St James
- Ellerker: St Anne
- Elstronwick: St Lawrence
- Elvington: Holy Trinity
- Escrick: St Helen
- Eston: Christ Church
- Eston: St George, Normanby
- Eston: St Hilda of Whitby, Grangetown
- Eston: St John the Evangelist, South Bank
- Etton: St Mary
- Everingham: St Everilda
- Faceby: St Mary Magdalene
- Fairburn: St James
- Fangfoss: St Martin
- Farlington: St Leonard
- Farndale: St Mary
- Felixkirk: St Felix
- Filey: St John
- Filey: St Oswald
- Fimber: St Mary
- Flamborough: St Oswald
- Flaxton: St Lawrence
- Folkton: St John the Evangelist
- Fordon: St James
- Foston: All Saints
- Foston-on-the-Wolds: St Andrew
- Fridaythorpe: St Mary
- Full Sutton: St Mary
- Fylingdales: St Stephen
- Ganton: St Nicholas
- Garton-in-Holderness: St Michael
- Garton-on-the-Wolds: St Michael & All Angels
- Gate Helmsley: St Mary
- Gillamoor: St Aidan
- Gilling East: Holy Cross
- Glaisdale: St Thomas
- Goathland: St Mary
- Goodmanham: All Saints
- Goxhill: St Giles
- Great Ayton: All Saints
- Great Ayton: Christ Church
- Great Driffield: All Saints
- Great Edstone: St Michael & All Angels
- Great Givendale: St Ethelburga
- Great Habton: St Chad
- Grindale: St Nicholas
- Gristhorpe: St Thomas
- Grosmont: St Matthew
- Guisborough: St Nicholas
- Hackness: St Peter
- Haddlesey: St John the Baptist
- Halsham: All Saints
- Hambleton: St Mary
- Harome: St Saviour
- Harpham: St John of Beverley
- Harswell: St Peter
- Harwood Dale: St Margaret
- Hawnby: All Saints
- Hawsker-cum-Stainsacre: All Saints
- Haxby: St Mary
- Haxby: St Nicholas, Wigginton
- Hayton: St Martin
- Healaugh: St John the Baptist
- Hedon: St Augustine
- Helmsley: All Saints
- Helperthorpe: St Peter
- Hemingbrough: St Mary the Virgin
- Hessay: St John the Baptist
- Hessle: All Saints
- Hilston: St Margaret
- Hilton: St Peter
- Hinderwell: St Hilda
- Hollym: St Nicholas
- Holme-on-Spalding-Moor: All Saints
- Holmpton: St Nicholas
- Holtby: Holy Trinity
- Hornsea: St Nicholas
- Hotham: St Oswald
- Hovingham: All Saints
- Howden: SS Peter & Paul's Minster
- Howsham: St John
- Huggate: St Mary
- Humbleton: St Peter
- Hunmanby: All Saints
- Husthwaite: St Nicholas
- Hutton Buscell: St Matthew
- Hutton Cranswick: St Peter
- Hutton-le-Hole: St Chad
- Huttons Ambo: St Margaret
- Ingleby Arncliffe: All Saints
- Ingleby Barwick: St Francis of Assisi
- Ingleby Greenhow: St Andrew
- Keyingham: St Nicholas
- Kilburn: St Mary
- Kildale: St Cuthbert
- Kilham: All Saints
- Kilnwick: All Saints
- Kingston-upon-Hull: St Aidan, Southcoates
- Kingston-upon-Hull: St Alban
- Kingston-upon-Hull: St Andrew, Sutton Park
- Kingston-upon-Hull: The Ascension
- Kingston-upon-Hull: St Columba, Drypool
- Kingston-upon-Hull: St Cuthbert
- Kingston-upon-Hull: St Giles, Marfleet
- Kingston-upon-Hull: St Hilda, Marfleet
- Kingston-upon-Hull: St James, Sutton-on-Hull
- Kingston-upon-Hull: St John the Baptist, Newington
- Kingston-upon-Hull: St John the Evangelist, Bransholme
- Kingston-upon-Hull: St John the Evangelist, Drypool
- Kingston-upon-Hull: St John the Evangelist, Newland
- Kingston-upon-Hull: St Margaret, Longhill
- Kingston-upon-Hull: St Mark, Anlaby Common
- Kingston-upon-Hull: St Martin
- Kingston-upon-Hull: St Mary the Virgin, Lowgate
- Kingston-upon-Hull: St Mary, Sculcoates
- Kingston-upon-Hull: St Michael & All Angels, Orchard Park
- Kingston-upon-Hull: St Michael & All Angels, Sutton-on-Hull
- Kingston-upon-Hull: St Nicholas
- Kingston-upon-Hull: St Paul, Sculcoates
- Kingston-upon-Hull: St Philip, Bilton Grange
- Kingston-upon-Hull: St Thomas
- Kingston-upon-Hull: Holy Trinity Minster
- Kingston-upon-Hull: Victoria Dock Church Plant
- Kirby Grindalythe: St Andrew
- Kirby Misperton: St Laurence
- Kirby Sigston: St Lawrence
- Kirby Underdale: All Saints
- Kirkburn: St Mary
- Kirkby-in-Cleveland: St Augustine
- Kirkby Knowle: St Wilfrid
- Kirkby Wharfe: St John the Baptist
- Kirkbymoorside: All Saints
- Kirkdale: St Gregory's Minster
- Kirklevington: SS Martin & Hilary
- Langdale End: St Peter
- Langtoft: St Peter
- Langton: St Andrew
- Lastingham: St Mary
- Laxton: St Peter
- Leake: St Mary
- Lealholm: St James
- Leavening: Venerable Bede
- Leconfield: St Catherine
- Ledsham: All Saints
- Ledston: St Thomas a Becket
- Leven: Holy Trinity
- Levisham: St John the Baptist
- Lingdale: St Chad
- Lissett: St James of Compostella
- Little Driffield: St Mary
- Liverton: St Michael
- Liverton Mines: St Hilda
- Lockington: St Mary
- Lockton: St Giles
- Loftus-in-Cleveland: St Leonard
- Londesborough: All Saints
- Long Marston: All Saints
- Long Riston: St Margaret
- Lotherton: St James
- Low Marishes: St Francis
- Low Worsall: All Saints
- Lowthorpe: St Martin
- Lund: All Saints
- Lythe: St Oswald
- Malton: St Mary the Virgin, Old Malton
- Malton: St Michael, New Malton
- Mappleton: All Saints
- Market Weighton: All Saints
- Marske-in-Cleveland: St Mark
- Marton (Ryedale): Mission Room
- Marton-in-the-Forest-cum-Moxby: St Mary
- Micklefield: St Mary the Virgin
- Middlesbrough: All Saints
- Middlesbrough: The Ascension
- Middlesbrough: St Barnabas, Linthorpe
- Middlesbrough: St Chad
- Middlesbrough: St Columba
- Middlesbrough: St Cuthbert, Marton-in-Cleveland
- Middlesbrough: St Cuthbert, Ormesby
- Middlesbrough: St John the Evangelist
- Middlesbrough: St Margaret of Scotland, Brookfield
- Middlesbrough: St Martin of Tours
- Middlesbrough: St Mary the Virgin, Nunthorpe
- Middlesbrough: St Mary, West Acklam
- Middlesbrough: St Oswald
- Middlesbrough: SS Peter & Paul, Stainton-in-Cleveland
- Middlesbrough: St Thomas
- Middlesbrough: Holy Trinity, North Ormesby
- Middleton (Ryedale): St Andrew
- Middleton-on-Leven: St Cuthbert
- Middleton-on-the-Wolds: St Andrew
- Millington: St Margaret
- Monk Fryston: St Wilfrid of Ripon
- Moor Monkton: All Saints
- Moorsholm: St Mary
- Murton: St James
- Myton-on-Swale: St Mary
- Muston: All Saints
- Naburn: St Matthew
- Nafferton: All Saints
- Nether Silton: All Saints
- Nether Poppleton: St Everilda
- New Marske: St Thomas
- Newbald: St Nicholas
- Newport: St Stephen
- Newton Kyme: St Andrew
- Newton-on-Ouse: All Saints
- Newton-on-Rawcliffe: St John
- Newton-under-Roseberry: St Oswald
- Normanby (Ryedale): St Andrew
- North Cave: All Saints
- North Cliffe: St John
- North Dalton: All Saints
- North Ferriby: All Saints
- North Frodingham: St Elgin
- North Grimston: St Nicholas
- North Otterington: St Michael & All Angels
- Northallerton: All Saints
- Northallerton: St James, Romanby
- Norton-juxta-Malton: St Peter
- Nunburnholme: St James
- Nunnington: All Saints
- Old Byland: All Saints
- Osmotherley: St Peter
- Oswaldkirk: St Oswald
- Ottringham: St Wilfrid
- Over Silton: St Mary
- Patrington: St Patrick
- Paull: SS Andrew & Mary
- Pickering: SS Peter & Paul
- Pockley: St John the Baptist
- Pocklington: All Saints
- Potto: St Mary
- Preston-in-Holderness: All Saints
- Rainton: Mission Room
- Raskelf: St Mary
- Ravenscar: St Hilda
- Redcar: All Saints, Dormanstown
- Redcar: Christ Church, Coatham
- Redcar: St Cuthbert, Kirkleatham
- Redcar: St Hilda, Kirkleatham
- Redcar: St Peter
- Reighton: St Peter
- Riccall: St Mary
- Rievaulx: St Mary
- Rillington: St Andrew
- Rise: All Saints
- Roos: All Saints
- Rosedale: St Lawrence
- Routh: All Saints
- Rowley: St Peter
- Roxby: St Nicholas
- Rudby-in-Cleveland: All Saints
- Rudston: All Saints
- Rufforth: All Saints
- Ruston Parva: St Nicholas
- Ryther: All Saints
- Saltburn-by-the-Sea: Emmanuel
- Salton: St John of Beverley
- Sancton: All Saints
- Sand Hutton: St Mary
- Sandhutton: St Leonard
- Sandsend: St Mary
- Saxton: All Saints
- Scackleton: St George the Martyr
- Scampston: St Martin
- Scarborough: Holy Apostles
- Scarborough: St Columba
- Scarborough: St James
- Scarborough: St Laurence, Scalby
- Scarborough: St Luke
- Scarborough: St Mark, Newby
- Scarborough: St Martin
- Scarborough: St Mary
- Scarborough: St Michael & All Angels, Wheatcroft
- Scarborough: St Saviour
- Scawton: St Mary
- Scorborough: St Leonard
- Scrayingham: SS Peter & Paul
- Seamer-in-Cleveland: St Martin
- Seamer (Scarborough): St Martin
- Seaton Ross: St Edmund
- Selby: St James the Apostle
- Selby: SS Mary & Germain's Abbey Church
- Sessay: St Cuthbert
- Settrington: All Saints
- Sewerby-with-Marton: St John
- Sherburn: St Hilda
- Sherburn-in-Elmet: All Saints
- Sheriff Hutton: St Helen & Holy Cross
- Shipton: Holy Evangelists
- Shiptonthorpe: All Saints
- Sigglesthorne: St Lawrence
- Sinnington: All Saints
- Skelton-in-Cleveland: All Saints
- Skelton (York): St Giles
- Skerne: St Leonard
- Skidby: St Michael
- Skipsea: All Saints
- Skipwith: St Helen
- Skirlaugh: St Augustine
- Skirpenbeck: St Mary
- Sledmere: St Mary
- Sleights: St John the Evangelist
- Slingsby: All Saints
- Snainton: St Stephen
- Sneaton: St Hilda
- South Cave: All Saints
- South Kilvington: St Wilfrid
- South Milford: St Mary the Virgin
- South Otterington: St Andrew
- Sowerby: St Oswald
- Speeton: St Leonard
- Sproatley: St Swithin
- Sproxton: St Chad
- Staintondale: St John the Baptist
- Staithes: St Peter
- Stamford Bridge: St John the Baptist
- Stillingfleet: St Helen
- Stillington: St Nicholas
- Stockton-on-the-Forest: Holy Trinity
- Stokesley: SS Peter & Paul
- Stonegrave: Holy Trinity Minster
- Strensall: St Mary the Virgin
- Sutton-on-Derwent: St Michael
- Sutton-on-the-Forest: All Hallows
- Swainby: Holy Cross
- Swanland: St Barnabas
- Swine: St Mary
- Tadcaster: St Mary the Virgin
- Terrington: All Saints
- Thirkleby: All Saints
- Thirsk: St Mary
- Thixendale: St Mary
- Thorganby: St Helen
- Thormanby: St Mary Magdalene
- Thornaby-on-Tees: St Mark the Evangelist, South Thornaby
- Thornaby-on-Tees: St Paul, North Thornaby
- Thornaby-on-Tees: St Peter ad Vincula, South Thornaby
- Thorngumbald: St Mary
- Thornton: St Michael
- Thornton-le-Dale: All Saints
- Thornton-le-Street: St Leonard
- Thorp Arch: All Saints
- Thorpe Bassett: All Saints
- Thorpe Willoughby: St Francis of Assisi
- Thwing: All Saints
- Tickton: St Paul
- Tockwith: Epiphany
- Tollerton: St Michael
- Topcliffe: St Columba
- Tunstall-in-Holderness: All Saints
- Ugglebarnby: All Saints
- Ugthorpe: Christ Church
- Ulrome: St Andrew
- Upper Helmsley: St Peter
- Upper Poppleton: All Saints
- Walkington: All Hallows
- Walton: St Peter
- Wansford: St Mary
- Warthill: St Mary
- Wass: St Thomas
- Watton: St Mary
- Wawne: St Peter
- Weaverthorpe: St Andrew
- Welburn near Malton: St John the Evangelist
- Welbury: St Leonard
- Welwick: St Mary
- West Heslerton: All Saints
- West Lutton: St Mary
- West Rounton: St Oswald
- Westerdale: Christ Church
- Westow: St Mary
- Wetwang: St Nicholas
- Wharram-le-Street: St Mary
- Wheldrake: St Helen
- Whitby: St Hilda
- Whitby: St John the Evangelist
- Whitby: St Mary
- Whitwell-on-the-Hill: St John the Evangelist
- Whorlton: Holy Cross
- Wighill: All Saints
- Wilberfoss: St John the Baptist
- Willerby (North Yorkshire): St Peter
- Willerby-and-Anlaby: St Andrew, Kirk Ella
- Willerby-and-Anlaby: St Luke, Willerby
- Willerby-and-Anlaby: St Peter, Anlaby
- Wilton (Redcar & Cleveland): St Cuthbert
- Wilton (Ryedale): St George
- Winestead: St Germain
- Wistow: All Saints
- Withernsea: St Matthew
- Withernwick: St Alban
- Wold Newton: All Saints
- Woodmansey: St Peter
- Wressle: St John of Beverley
- Wykeham: All Saints
- Yapham: St Martin
- Yarm: St Mary Magdalene
- Yearsley: Holy Trinity
- Yedingham: St John the Baptist
- York: St Peter's Minster
- York: All Saints North Street
- York: All Saints Pavement
- York: All Saints, Huntington
- York: St Andrew, New Earswick
- York: St Barnabas
- York: St Chad
- York: Christ Church, Heworth
- York: St Clement
- York: St Denys
- York: St Edward the Confessor, Dringhouses
- York: St Helen Stonegate
- York: St Hilda
- York: St James the Deacon, Acomb Moor
- York: St Lawrence
- York: St Luke
- York: St Mark, Rawcliffe
- York: St Martin le Grand
- York: St Mary Bishophill Junior
- York: St Michael le Belfrey
- York: St Olave
- York: St Oswald, Fulford
- York: St Paul
- York: St Paul, Heslington
- York: SS Philip & James, Clifton
- York: Holy Redeemer, Acomb
- York: St Stephen, Acomb
- York: St Thomas
- York: St Thomas, Osbaldwick
- York: Holy Trinity Micklegate
- York: Holy Trinity, Heworth
- York: St Wulstan, Heworth
- York: Local Ecumenical Project, Clifton Moor

== Redundant, closed, former, abandoned and demolished churches ==
- Argam: St John the Baptist
- Barmby-on-the-Marsh: St Helen
- Beverley: St Martin
- Birdforth: St Mary
- Burniston: Chapel
- Burstwick: All Saints
- Cottam: Holy Trinity
- Dishforth: Christ Church
- Easby: St Agatha (private chapel, may still be active)
- East Heslerton: St Andrew
- Easterside: St Agnes
- Ellerton: St Mary
- Foxholes: St Mary
- Fraisthorpe: St Edmund
- Hemlington: St Timothy
- High Worsall: St John
- Holme-on-the-Wolds: St Peter
- Kepwick: St Margaret
- Kilnsea: St Helen
- Kilnwick Percy: St Helen
- Kingston-upon-Hull: All Saints, Sculcoates
- Kingston-upon-Hull: St Andrew, Drypool
- Kingston-upon-Hull: Transfiguration
- Kingston-upon-Hull: Conventional District Church, Kingswood
- Knapton: St Edmund
- Leppington: St Helen
- Low Hutton: Chapel
- Middlesbrough: St Cuthbert
- Middlesbrough: St Paul
- North Thornaby: St Luke
- Nunkeeling: SS Mary Magdalene & Helen
- Picton: St Hilary
- Pilmoor: St Andrew
- Ruswarp: St Bartholomew
- Scarborough: All Saints
- Scarborough: Christ Church
- Scarborough: Holy Trinity
- Skeffling: St Helen
- Skipton-on-Swale: St John the Evangelist
- Sunk Island: Holy Trinity
- Thornton-le-Beans: Chapel
- Thornton-le-Moor: St Barnabas
- Ulleskelf: St Saviour
- Upleatham: St Andrew
- Warter: St James
- Wharram Percy: St Martin
- Whenby: St Martin
- Wintringham: St Peter
- York: All Saints Fishergate
- York: All Saints Peaseholme Green
- York: Holy Trinity Goodramgate
- York: Holy Trinity Kings Court
- York: St Andrew Fishergate
- York: St Andrew St Andrewgate
- York: St Benet
- York: St Clement
- York: St Crux
- York: St Cuthbert
- York: St Edward the Martyr
- York: St George Fishergate
- York: St Giles in the Suburbs
- York: St Gregory
- York: St Helen on the Walls or Aldwark
- York: St Helen Fishergate
- York: St John del Pyke
- York: St John in the Marsh or Hungate
- York: St John Micklegate
- York: St John Ouse Bridge End
- York: St Margaret
- York: St Martin Micklegate
- York: St Mary ad Valvas
- York: St Mary Bishophill Senior
- York: St Mary Castlegate
- York: St Mary Layerthorpe
- York: St Mary Lounelithgate
- York: St Mary Walmgate
- York: St Maurice
- York: St Michael Spurriergate
- York: St Michael without Walmgate
- York: St Nicholas Lawrence Street
- York: St Nicholas Micklegate
- York: St Peter le Willows
- York: St Peter the Little
- York: St Sampson of York
- York: St Saviour in the Marsh
- York: St Stephen Fishergate
- York: St Wilfrid
