= Barry Hill (bishop) =

English Anglican bishop

The Right Reverend Barry Hill
- Bishop of Whitby
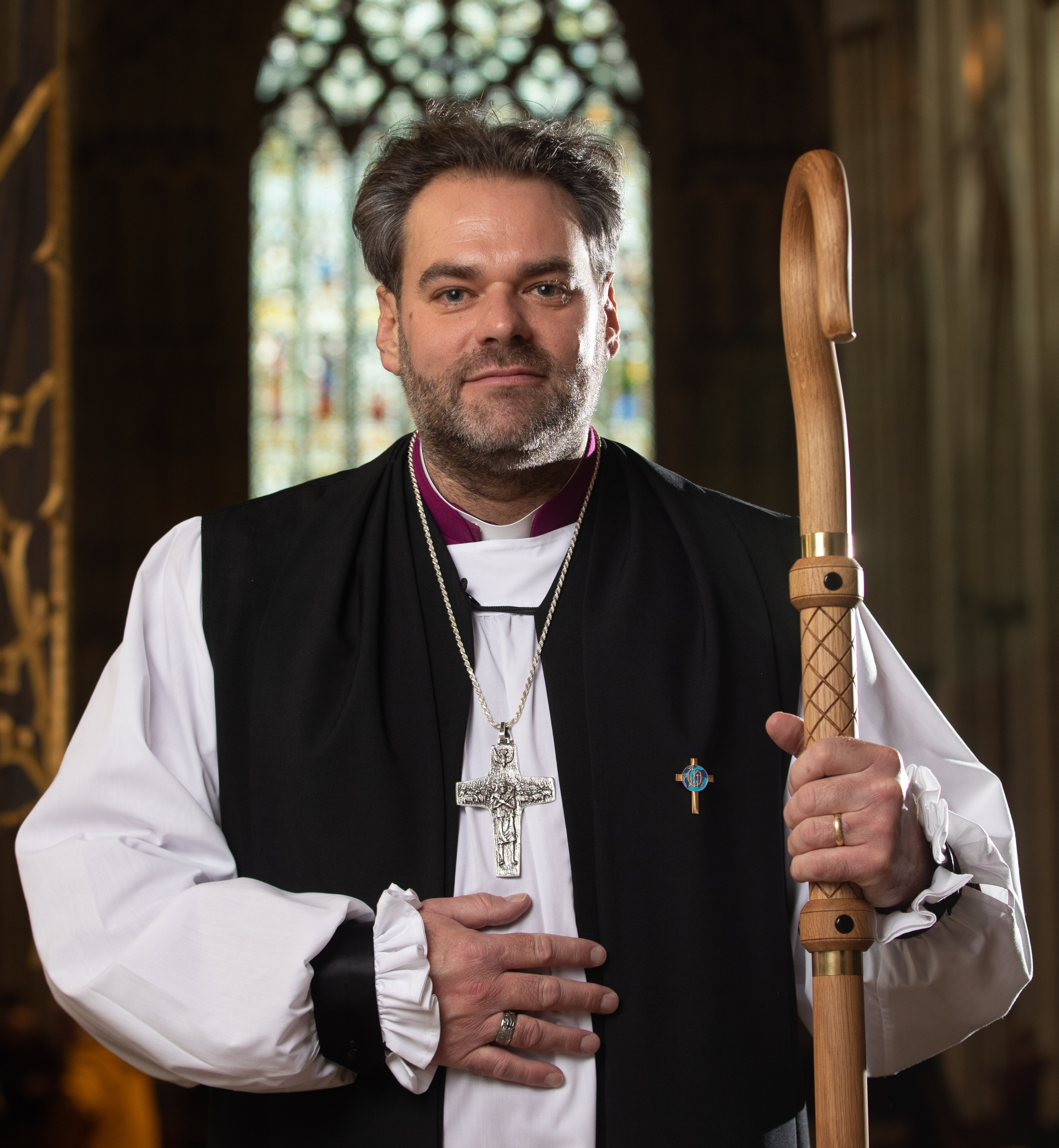
- Hill at his consecration in 2024
- Church: Church of England
- Province: York
- Diocese: York
- See: Whitby
- In office: 2024 to present
- Predecessor: Paul Ferguson
- Previous posts: Diocesan Mission Enabler (2023-2024); Team Rector, Market Harborough (2017–2023)

Orders
- Ordination: 2005 (deacon); 2006 (priest)
- Consecration: 10 October 2024 by Stephen Cottrell

Personal details
- Born: February 1979 (age 47)
- Denomination: Anglican
- Spouse: Pep Hill
- Children: 2
- Profession: Bishop
- Education: Wycliffe Hall, Oxford

Barry Leon Hill (born February 1979) is an English Anglican bishop. Since 2024, he has served as the Bishop of Whitby, a suffragan bishop in the Diocese of York.

== Early life ==
Hill left school at 18, spending a year on an internship scheme as a youth worker, which led to voluntary roles in youth work. He then worked in the flight simulation industry.

== Ordained ministry ==
Hill was ordained deacon in 2005 and priest in 2006. After a curacy in Loughborough, he was Diocesan Mission Enabler from 2009 until 2017, supporting clergy and lay leaders in the Diocese of Leicester in areas of parish renewal and mission, vocations, discipleship, and training.

Hill was appointed as Team Rector of Market Harborough in 2017. Alongside this, he held a half-time role overseeing and supporting new churches and church plants.

From 2023 until his appointment as Bishop of Whitby, he worked as Diocesan Strategy Development Enabler, leading the discernment and drafting of the strategy of the Diocese of Leicester.

During his time in the Diocese of Leicester, Hill served as a trustee of a large multi-academy trust, with a particular focus on support for those with Special Education Needs and Disabilities. He was a member of the Church of England's General Synod from 2015 until 2024, leading a debate on evangelism and witness in 2019.

=== Episcopal ministry ===
On 10 October 2024, he was consecrated as a bishop by Stephen Cottrell, Archbishop of York, during a service at York Minster.

As Bishop of Whitby, Hill serves across the Diocese of York, holding particular geographical responsibility for the Archdeaconry of Cleveland. He also chairs the Diocesan Board of Education and leads across the Diocese on what it means to grow younger and more diverse.

== Personal life ==
Hill is a life-long supporter of Brighton and Hove Albion Football Club. He has the club's crest and Middlesbrough's Riverside Stadium on his robes, and has spoken of praying for the team.

Hill has spoken of being a P!nk "superfan". He enjoys musical theatre, cooking and rollerskating.

Church of England titles
Preceded by Paul Ferguson	Bishop of Whitby; 2023–present	Incumbent
