= Harry Woollcombe =

Bishop of Selby & Whitby (1869–1941)

Henry St John Stirling Woollcombe (27 December 1869 – 1 December 1941) was the inaugural Bishop of Whitby from 1923 until 1939, and also of Selby. Born into a clerical family, he was educated at Clifton College and Keble College, Oxford, before being ordained in 1895. After a curacy in Stepney, he became head of the Oxford House University Settlement in nearby Bethnal Green. A brief spell as chaplain to Cosmo Gordon Lang (Archbishop of York) was followed by a decade as the parish priest of Armley. Promotion to be the Sub Dean of Diocese of Coventry in 1922 was swiftly followed by elevation to the episcopate. After 16 years at Whitby, he made a sideways move to become Bishop of Selby, a post he held for 18 months. His Times obituary noted his capacity for "getting on with and getting the best out of all conditions of men".

His grandson, Humphrey Smith, was the owner of Samuel Smith Old Brewery in Tadcaster.

Church of England titles
| New title | Bishop of Whitby; 1923–1939 | Succeeded by Harold Hubbard |
| New title | Bishop of Selby; 1939–1940 | Succeeded by Carey Knyvett |
