= Thornton-le-Beans Chapel =

Chapel in North Yorkshire, England

Coordinates: 54.3075°N 1.3936°W

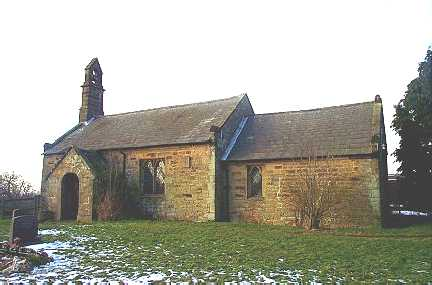
- Thornton-le-Beans Chapel from the south

- Location in North Yorkshire
- OS grid reference: SE 396 904
- Location: Thornton-le-Beans, North Yorkshire
- Country: England
- Denomination: Anglican

History
- Status: Chapel of ease
- Founded: 1770

Architecture
- Functional status: Redundant
- Heritage designation: Grade II
- Designated: 31 March 1970
- Architectural type: Chapel
- Groundbreaking: 1770

Specifications
- Materials: Stone, slate roof

Thornton-le-Beans Chapel is in the village of Thornton-le-Beans, North Yorkshire, England. It is a redundant Anglican chapel of ease. The chapel is recorded in the National Heritage List for England as a designated Grade II listed building. Since 2010 it has been under the care of the Friends of Friendless Churches.

== History ==
The chapel was built in 1770, as a chapel of ease to St Andrew's Church, South Otterington, in the deanery of Mowbray, the archdeaconry of Cleveland, and the diocese of York. The font was donated by Dr Edward Pusey. The chapel was restored in 1886. It was declared redundant on 1 June 1997, and vested in the Friends of Friendless Churches in 2010.

== Architecture ==
Constructed in stone with ashlar dressings, the chapel has a roof of Westmorland slate. It has s simple plan, consisting of a four-bay nave with a south porch, and a chancel. At the west end is a gabled bellcote. On the south side of the church is a single-light window, the porch, a sundial, and a two-light window. In the chancel is a single-light south window, and an east window with a pointed arch. There are fragments of ancient glass in the nave windows.

== See also ==
- Listed buildings in Thornton-le-Beans
