= Roxby Hall =

- North Yorkshire, England
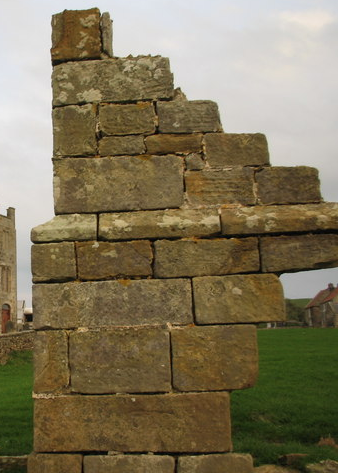
- Only surviving wall fragment

Site information
- Type: Castle or manor house
- Open to the public: Yes
- Condition: Ruined

Location
- Shown within North Yorkshire.
- Coordinates: 54.535000°N 0.823700°W
- Grid reference: grid reference SO716927

Site history
- Built: 13th century
- In use: late 13th century until 1632
- Demolished: 1632–52 (main building); after 1652 (earthworks)

Roxby Hall (or Rousby Hall) is a former manor house or castle in the town of Roxby, North Yorkshire, England. Only one ruined corner and earthworks of Roxby Hall remains in a field adjacent to St. Nicholas’s Church.

== History ==
Roxby Hall was supposedly built on pre-13th century pasture land during the late 13th century.

It was mostly replaced and rebuilt during the 1540s and the 1560s by Sir Richard Cholmley (1516-1583). During the early 17th century, Roxby Hall was abandoned and by around 1632, the front wings, the east back wing, part of the main block and an outbuilding were demolished.

By 1652, only the wall corner was left standing. The earthworks south and west of the site were partially destroyed when the site was reverted to pasture starting from 1652.
