= Listed buildings in Roxby, North Yorkshire =

Roxby is a civil parish in the county of North Yorkshire, England. It contains eight listed buildings that are recorded in the National Heritage List for England. All the listed buildings are designated at Grade II, the lowest of the three grades, which is applied to "buildings of national importance and special interest". The parish contains the village of Roxby and the surrounding countryside. The listed buildings consist of farmhouses and farm buildings, a church, a blacksmith's shop and a milepost.

== Buildings ==
Name and location	Photograph	Date	Notes
Park House Farmhouse and outbuilding 54.52756°N 0.83786°W	—	17th century	The farmhouse and outbuilding are in sandstone on a plinth, and have a pantile roof with stone ridges, coping and kneelers. The main house and the downhouse have two storeys, and each has two bays, and the outbuilding has one tall storey and two bays.
St Nicholas' Church; 54.53671°N 0.82570°W		17th century	The church was largely rebuilt in 1818, and was restored in 1909. It is built in sandstone with a Lakeland slate roof. The church consists of a nave and a chancel in one unit, and a west tower. The tower has three stages, and contains a round-arched west doorway with voussoirs, above which is a two-light west window, two-light segmental-headed bell openings, and a parapet with corner battlements. The east window has five lights and a large keystone.
Manor Farmhouse; 54.53587°N 0.82522°W		c. 1700	The farmhouse is in sandstone, the main house has a Welsh slate roof and the roof of the downhouse is in pantile. There are two storeys, the main house has two bays, and the downhouse has one. In both parts is a doorway with a quoined surround. There is a blocked fire window, one sash window, and the other windows are casements.
Oak House Farmhouse, stable and barn 54.54179°N 0.81111°W		Early to mid-18th century	The farmhouse and farm buildings are in sandstone and have pantile roofs with stone coping and kneelers. The house and downhouse have two storeys, and each has two bays. The doorway has an oblong fanlight, and the windows are sashes. To the left is a stable containing a stable door, and further to the left is a single-bay barn with two stable doors.
Gin gang west of Home Farmhouse; 54.53451°N 0.82416°W		Late 18th century (probable)	The gin gang is in sandstone and has a pantile roof with tile ridges and a spike finial. There is an octagonal plan, it has tapering piers on plinths, a pointed roof, and open spaces between the piers.
Gin gang east of Manor Farmhouse; 54.53576°N 0.82496°W	—	Late 18th century (probable)	The gin gang is in sandstone and has a pantile roof with stone ridges. There is an octagonal plan, it has tapering piers and a steeply-pitched roof, and an open entrance bay.
Blacksmiths Shop, Turton Cottages; 54.53030°N 0.82082°W		1858	The building is in stone on a chamfered plinth, and has a Welsh slate roof with coped gables, and a single storey. In the centre is a doorway in the form of a horseshoe, above which is an inscribed and dated stone plaque, and a coped gable with kneelers and a finial. This is flanked by three-light cross windows containing casements, and beyond them are round-arched stable doors with a coat of arms in the tympanum.
Milepost; 54.50609°N 0.83308°W		Late 19th century	The milepost on the north side of the A171 road, to the northeast of the Scaling Dam Reservoir, is in cast iron. It has a triangular plan and a triangular sloping top. On the top is inscribed "NRYCC", on the left side is the distance to Whitby, and on the right side to Guisborough.
