= Listed buildings in Askham Richard =

Askham Richard is a civil parish in the unitary authority of the City of York, North Yorkshire, England. It contains eight listed buildings that are recorded in the National Heritage List for England. Of these, one is listed at Grade II*, the middle of the three grades, and the others are at Grade II, the lowest grade. The parish contains the village of Askham Richard and the surrounding area. All the listed buildings are in the village, most are houses, and the others are a church, and a coffin and a monument in the churchyard.

== Key ==
Grade	Criteria
II*	Particularly important buildings of more than special interest
II	Buildings of national importance and special interest

== Buildings ==
Name and location	Photograph	Date	Notes	Grade
Coffin; 53.92537°N 1.18380°W		Roman (possible)	The coffin is in the churchyard of St Mary's Church, to the south of the church. It is in millstone grit, and consists of a simple coffin with a chamfered lid. It was found in a neighbouring field in 1838 and moved to its present site.	II
St Mary's Church; 53.92545°N 1.18376°W		Late 12th century	The church has been altered through the centuries, particularly in an extensive restoration in 1878–79. It is built in magnesian limestone and sandstone with a tile roof, and consists of a nave and a chancel in one, a south porch ad a north vestry. On the west gable is a slightly projecting bell turret on a modillion band, with a round-headed bell opening, a hood mould and a cross on the apex. The porch, dating from 1879, contains a round-arched opening in Norman style, and the doorway is the original Norman, with two orders of shafts, and waterleaf and scalloped capitals. In the wall of the vestry is an inserted reconstructed Norman or earlier doorway. The windows have round-arched heads, some with hood moulds.	II*
Rose Cottage; 53.92370°N 1.18437°W	—	Early to mid-18th century	The house is in pinkish-brown brick with a floor band and a pantile roof. There are two storeys and two bays. The central doorway has an oblong fanlight, and to the left is the blocked original doorway under an elliptical arch. The windows are sashes in architraves, those on the upper floor under elliptical arches.	II
Cedar Tree Farm; 53.92503°N 1.18528°W	—	Mid-18th century	The farmhouse is in pinkish-orange brick, with a floor band, a rendered band below the eaves a wooden modillion eaves cornice, and a grey slate roof. There are two storeys and four bays. On the front is a porch and a doorway with a decorated oblong fanlight, the windows are sashes in architraves, and all the openings are under blocked elliptical arches.	II
White House Farm; 53.92443°N 1.18358°W	—	Mid-18th century (probable)	The house is in colourwashed and rendered brick, with a dentilled eaves band and a pantile roof. There are two storeys and three bays. In the centre is a wooden porch and a doorway, above which is a blocked opening under an elliptical arch. The windows are sashes in architraves.	II
Monument; 53.92551°N 1.18348°W	—	1770	The monument is in the churchyard of St Mary's Church, to the east of the church. It consists of a fluted urn in white marble, decorated with wreaths and Greek key patterns. It stands on a broken sandstone column, and it is about 2 metres (6 ft 7 in) in height.	II
Jasmin Cottage; 53.92364°N 1.18434°W	—	Late 18th century	The house is in pinkish-brown brick with a pantile roof. There are two storeys and one bay. The doorway on the right has a fanlight and an elliptical arch, and the windows are sashes, the ground floor window under an elliptical arch.	II
Prospect House; 53.92468°N 1.18507°W		Early 19th century	The house is in pinkish-brown brick, with a wooden eaves band and a grey slate roof. There are two storeys and three bays, and a low outshut to the rear left. The central doorway has fluted pilasters with caps, a radial fanlight and an open pediment. The windows are sashes in architraves, those on the ground floor under segmental arches, and on the upper floor under cambered lintels.	II
