= Listed buildings in Coneysthorpe =

Coneysthorpe is a civil parish in the county of North Yorkshire, England. It contains 15 listed buildings that are recorded in the National Heritage List for England. All the listed buildings are designated at Grade II, the lowest of the three grades, which is applied to "buildings of national importance and special interest". The parish contains the village of Coneysthorpe and the surrounding area. In the parish is the estate yard of Castle Howard, which contains listed buildings, and there are two listed gateways to Castle Howard. The other listed buildings consist of houses and cottages, a chapel and a former school.

== Buildings ==
Name and location	Photograph	Date	Notes
House north of The Yews; 54.13382°N 0.91126°W	—	Early 18th century (probable)	The house is in sandstone with a swept pantile roof. There are two storeys and three bays, and a single-storey three-bay wing on the right. In the centre of the main range is a doorway under a flat stone arch, flanked by sash windows with tooled wedge lintels, and in the upper floor are horizontally-sliding sashes. The wing contains a casement window and a horizontally-sliding sash.
Limekiln Farmhouse; 54.13394°N 0.91204°W	—	Mid to late 18th century	A house in limestone, with a red and blue pantile roof, two storeys and three bays. The doorway is in the centre, above it is a blocked window, and the other windows are sashes. All the openings have flat stone arches.
Secretary's Cottage; 54.13361°N 0.91209°W	—	Mid to late 18th century	A limestone house with sprocketed eaves, and a pantile roof with gable coping and a shaped kneeler on the right. There are two storeys and four bays. On the front are two doorways, and the windows are sashes, in the ground floor with concrete lintels, and above with timber lintels.
Houses south of Limekiln Farmhouse; 54.13376°N 0.91210°W		Late 18th century	Three houses, later two, in limestone, with a pantile roof, gable coping and shaped kneelers. There is a single storey and attics, and three bays. On the front are two doorways and a blocked doorway, two sash windows, a horizontally-sliding sash, and two small fixed lights. The attics contain three gabled dormers with casements.
Former Leo's Stores; 54.13214°N 0.91099°W		Late 18th century	A house and a former shop in sandstone, with a slate roof, gable coping and shaped kneelers. There are two storeys and an L-shaped plan, with three bays, the left bay gabled. On the front are two doorways, and two shop windows, and the other windows are sashes. The shop windows have flat lintels, and the other openings have tooled wedge lintels and keystones.
Primrose Cottage; 54.13269°N 0.91085°W	—	Late 18th century	The cottage is in sandstone, and has a swept M-shaped pantile roof. There is a single storey, two bays, and two parallel ranges. On the front is a doorway, the windows are casements, and all the openings have channelled lintels.
The Yews; 54.13358°N 0.91122°W	—	Late 18th century	The house is in sandstone, it was refronted in the 19th century in brick, and has a pantile roof with gable coping and shaped kneelers. In the centre is a doorway with a divided fanlight, the windows are sashes, and the openings have painted flat brick arches with keystones.
Former Post Office and cottage 54.13248°N 0.91184°W		Late 18th to early 19th century	Two houses in limestone, with a pantile roof, gable coped and a shaped kneeler on the left. There is a single storey, three bays, and an outshut on the right. On the front are two doorways and horizontally-sliding sash windows with channelled lintels and keystones. In the attic are three gabled dormers.
East and south range, Castle Howard Estate Yard; 54.13132°N 0.91228°W	—	Early 19th century	The buildings are in sandstone on a plinth, and have Welsh slate roofs with gable coping and moulded or shaped kneelers. They consist of coach houses, an implement shed and utility rooms, and a blacksmith's shop. The buildings are in one and two storeys, and form two ranges at right angles. The coach houses have elliptical-headed entrances with imposts, and keystones. Most of the openings have elliptical heads and arched lintels, and the blacksmith's shop has horizontally-sliding sash windows with wedge lintels.
Office and joiners' shop, Castle Howard Estate Yard; 54.13163°N 0.91261°W		Early 19th century	The buildings are in sandstone, and have Welsh slate roofs with gable coping and shaped kneelers. They have an L-shaped plan, with the office building on the left, and the joiners' shop to the right. The office has a single storey, and contains sash windows with imposts and keystones. The joiners' shop has two storeys, four bays, and a single-storey extension on the right. It contains an elliptical-headed carriage entrance, a doorway with a fanlight, and elliptical-ached fixed windows, all with imposts and keystones.
Sawmill and engine house, Castle Howard Estate Yard; 54.13174°N 0.91284°W		Early 19th century	The buildings are in sandstone, and have an M-shaped Welsh slate roof, with the sawmill on the left and the engine house on the right. There are two storeys, and the gable ends face the road. The left gable end contains an elliptical-arched doorway with a divided fanlight and imposts, flanked by low openings. In the upper floor are two round-arched fixed windows with imposts and keystones. The right gable end is pedimented and has three bays, the middle bay projecting slightly. In each bay is a tall round-headed window, the middle one blind, with imposts and keystones, and in the gable is an oculus.
Chapel of Ease; 54.13371°N 0.91171°W		1834	The chapel, which is in Georgian style, was restored and refurnished in 1888 by Temple Moore. It is in limestone on a plinth, with quoins, a moulded cornice with a datestone and a pediment, and a Welsh slate roof. On the roof is a bell turret with round-arched openings, imposts and keystones, and a domed roof with a ball finial and a weathervane. At the west end are double doors in a moulded architrave, and a hood on consoles. On the south side are sash windows with moulded architraves and hoods, on the north side is a vestry, and at the east end is a sash window with a wedge lintel and a keystone.
Former school 54.13310°N 0.91201°W		1852	The school was extended to the left in 1895, and later used as the village hall. It is in limestone on a plinth, with quoins, the original roof is in Westmorland slate, the roof of the later part is in Roman tile, both roofs have gable coping and moulded kneelers, and there is one storey. The earlier part has two sash windows, between which is a decorated datestone, above which is a cornice band. To the right is a lower entrance bay with a doorway and a coped parapet; all the openings have triple keystones.
Gate piers, railings and end piers, North Lodge, Castle Howard; 54.13257°N 0.91853°W		c. 1874	The piers are in sandstone and have a square plan, and the railings are in wrought iron. The gate piers each has a moulded plinth and cornice, the end piers each has a plinth, pulvinated panels and a moulded cornice, and all have a ball finial on a stepped base. The railings between the gate and end piers are on low walls and have lancet heads.
Gate piers and wall, Castle Howard Park; 54.13229°N 0.90934°W		Late 19th century (probable)	The piers and wall are in sandstone. Flanking the carriage and pedestrian entrances, and at the ends, are square piers with banded rustication, cornices and cushion tops. The wall extends along the road, and curves inwards towards the carriage entrance.
