= Listed buildings in Seamer, Hambleton =

Seamer, Hambleton is a civil parish in the county of North Yorkshire, England. It contains three listed buildings that are recorded in the National Heritage List for England. All the listed buildings are designated at Grade II, the lowest of the three grades, which is applied to "buildings of national importance and special interest". The parish contains the village of Seamer and the surrounding countryside, and the listed buildings consist of a farmhouse, and a church with associated structures.

== Buildings ==
Name and location	Photograph	Date	Notes
Low House Farmhouse; 54.49449°N 1.23556°W	—	18th century	The farmhouse is in pinkish brick, and has a pantile roof with stone copings and kneelers. There are two storeys and four bays. On the front is a porch, and the windows are cross-casements in architraves under flat gauged brick arches. Brick and stone steps lead up to a granary door, and there are granary openings.
Wall and mounting block, St Martin's Church; 54.48540°N 1.23186°W		18th century (probable)	The retaining wall to the south of the church consists of large coursed squared stone blocks. Attached to it is a mounting block of five steps.
St Martin's Church; 54.48563°N 1.23218°W		1822	The church, built to replace a medieval church on the side, is in limestone and has a roof of Lakeland slate. It consists of a nave, a chancel and a slim west tower. The tower has two stages, single bell openings with hood moulds, and an embattled parapet. Along the body of the church are buttresses, paired lancet windows with hood moulds, and the east window has three lights and a pointed head.
