= Listed buildings in Middleton-on-Leven =

Middleton-on-Leven is a civil parish in the county of North Yorkshire, England. It contains four listed buildings that are recorded in the National Heritage List for England. All the listed buildings are designated at Grade II, the lowest of the three grades, which is applied to "buildings of national importance and special interest". The parish contains the village of Middleton-on-Leven and the surrounding countryside. The listed buildings consist of two farmhouses, a farm building and a church.

== Buildings ==
Name and location	Photograph	Date	Notes
Middleton Grange; 54.47025°N 1.27786°W		Early to mid-18th century	The farmhouse and attached cottage are in brick, with a moulded eaves cornice, and a concrete tile roof with stone copings and kneelers. Both parts have two storeys, and the house has four bays. The middle two windows on the upper floor are blocked and painted trompe l'oeil, and the others are sashes with gauged brick arches and keystones. The cottage is lower, with two bays. It has one casement window, the other windows are horizontally-sliding sashes, and in the gable end are pigeon holes.
Granary stable, Middleton Grange; 54.47035°N 1.27739°W		18th century	The granary stable is in brick, with a stepped eaves cornice, and a pantile roof with stone copings. There are two storeys and two bays. External steps lead up to a gable doorway and a loading door.
Goslingmire Farmhouse; 54.46769°N 1.26998°W		Mid-18th century	The farmhouse is rendered, and has a roof of ridged concrete tile with stone copings and kneelers. The farmhouse and the adjoining lower cottage have two storeys and two bays each. Most of the windows on the front are sashes, and at the rear is a horizontally-sliding sash window and a round-arched stair window.
St Cuthbert's Church; 54.48293°N 1.28345°W		1799	The church is in stone with a tile roof and boarded eaves. It consists of a nave and a chancel under one roof, and on the west gable is a bellcote, The west doorway has a rounded head and a keystone, and above it is a dated and initialled plaque. The windows have pointed arches.
