= Listed buildings in Thornton-le-Beans =

Thornton-le-Beans is a civil parish in the county of North Yorkshire, England. It contains five listed buildings that are recorded in the National Heritage List for England. All the listed buildings are designated at Grade II, the lowest of the three grades, which is applied to "buildings of national importance and special interest". The parish contains the village of Thornton-le-Beans and the surrounding countryside. The listed buildings consist of three houses, a farmhouse and a former chapel.

== Buildings ==
Name and location	Photograph	Date	Notes
Crosby Court; 54.32105°N 1.39695°W		Mid to late 18th century	The house is in red brick, with dressings in white brick and stone, a floor band, a moulded eaves band, and hipped Welsh slate roofs. The main south block has two storeys, five bays, and a bowed bay on the left corner. The middle three bays project slightly under a pediment containing an oculus. The central doorway has Doric columns, a fanlight, an archivolt, a frieze with paterae, and an open pediment, and the windows are sashes. To the right is a single-storey single-bay extension with a cornice and a balustraded parapet, and further to the right is a two-storey one-bay block with a full-height canted bay window. The right return has five bays, and a central doorway in a moulded architrave, above which is an oval window, and a cornice on consoles.
Pasture House; 54.29229°N 1.38356°W	—	Mid to late 18th century	The house, which was later extended, is stuccoed, with stone dressings, and a pantile roof, hipped on the right. There are two storeys, a front of eight bays, and a rear wing. The front range has blocks of three, three and two bays. On the right bay is a Doric porch with two columns, a frieze, a cornice and a blocking course with a panel above, and the doorway has a fanlight. The windows are in moulded architraves, on the ground floor they are casements, and the upper floor has sash windows. On the block is a floor band, a moulded cornice and a parapet. The other blocks contain sash windows, those in the middle block with architraves.
Chapel of Ease; 54.30753°N 1.39354°W		1770	The former chapel is in stone with a Westmorland slate roof, and consists of a nave with a south porch, and a chancel. At the west end is a gabled bellcote with a cornice. The porch is gabled and has a basket arch, and an inner square-headed doorway with a chamfered surround. On the south front are square-headed windows with cusped lights, and a sundial without a gnomon. The east window is cusped and has a pointed head.
Hawnby House; 54.30847°N 1.39147°W	—	Late 18th century	The house is in stone, and has a pantile roof with stone coping. There are two storeys and two bays. The central doorway has a flat arch, and the windows are sashes.
Martins Folly; 54.30196°N 1.39523°W		Late 18th to early 19th century	The farmhouse is in red brick, with stepped eaves, and a Welsh slate roof with shaped kneelers. There are two storeys and three bays. The doorway has an architrave and a fanlight with radiating glazing bars, and the windows are casements with flat brick arches.
