= Harold Hubbard =

Harold Evelyn Hubbard (1883 – 1953) was the second Bishop of Whitby and an Honorary Chaplain to the King. A grandson of the first Lord Addingdon, he was educated at Eton and Christ Church, Oxford and ordained in 1908. After a curacy at Skelton-in-Cleveland, he served with great distinction in the First World War. He was interviewed for a commission as a Temporary Chaplain to the Forces in November, 1914. His experience of preaching in the open air in South Shields Market Place suggested that he could communicate with large, noisy, hostile audiences. He served in France mainly with the Guards Division with whom he earned a DSO and a MC. His DSO citation reads ‘For conspicuous gallantry and devotion to duty. When several men had been killed by a sniper attempting to rescue a wounded man from a derelict tank, he went out regardless of danger, and brought the man in. His gallantry and courage were an inspiration to the men throughout operations’. His MC was gazetted on 13, September, 1918. ‘For conspicuous gallantry and devotion to duty. This Chaplain was untiring in his attention and care for the wounded under heavy shell fire, especially when the regiment aid post had to be moved back, in remaining at the forward post the rest of the day so as to direct cases that came down in to the new post’. Hubbard was gassed and hospitalised.

When peace came, he was successively Rector of Gisborough in Cleveland, Chaplain of Cheltenham College, and finally Vicar of St John’s Middlesbrough, before elevation to the Episcopate in 1939. He served throughout the whole of the Second World War and retired in 1946. On his death in 1953, his Will stated, somewhat unusually, that he wished to dispel any misconception that he had been making a fortune from his ministry in the church: the large sum being the result of legacies from wealthier members of his distinguished family.

== Notes ==
Church of England titles
Preceded by Henry St John Stirling Woollcombe	Bishop of Whitby; 1939 – 1946	Succeeded by Walter Hubert Baddeley
