= Listed buildings in Rudby =

Rudby is a civil parish in the county of North Yorkshire, England. It contains four listed buildings that are recorded in the National Heritage List for England. Of these, one is listed at Grade I, the highest of the three grades, and the others are at Grade II, the lowest grade. The parish contains the village of Rudby and the surrounding area. All the listed buildings are in the village, and consist of a church, a farmhouse, a bridge and a pair of pillboxes.

== Key ==
Grade	Criteria
I	Buildings of exceptional interest, sometimes considered to be internationally important
II	Buildings of national importance and special interest

== Buildings ==
Name and location	Photograph	Date	Notes	Grade
All Saints' Church; 54.45323°N 1.27375°W		Early 14th century	The church has been altered, extended and restored through the centuries. It is built in stone and has a Welsh slate roof. The church consists of a nave, north and south aisles, a chancel, and a south tower porch. The tower has three stages, diagonal buttresses, two-light bell openings, and an embattled parapet with corner pinnacles.	I
Rudby Green Farmhouse; 54.45562°N 1.27561°W	—	Late 17th or early 18th century	The farmhouse, which has been extended, is in pink brick, with a stepped and cogged eaves cornice, and a pantile roof with stone copings. There are two storeys and three wide bays, a small right extension, a larger extension on the left, a rear extension and a rear wing. On the front is a doorway and casement windows, and on the left extension is a stable door.	II
Hutton Bridge; 54.45268°N 1.27406°W		1755	The bridge carries Hutton Bank over the River Leven. It is in sandstone, and consists of two segmental arches with hood moulds. The pointed cutwaters rise to form half-hexagonal pedestrian refuges. The bridge has a plain coped parapet, slightly splayed at the ends.	II
Pair of pillboxes 54.45564°N 1.27191°W	—	1940	The pillboxes, built for the Second World War, are in reinforced concrete. They have a rectangular plan, and are half-sunken into the ground. There are wide gun embrasures in the front and side walls.	II
