= Listed buildings in Faceby =

Faceby is a civil parish in the county of North Yorkshire, England. It contains nine listed buildings that are recorded in the National Heritage List for England. All the listed buildings are designated at Grade II, the lowest of the three grades, which is applied to "buildings of national importance and special interest". The parish contains the village of Faceby and the surrounding countryside. The listed buildings consist of houses and associated structures, and a church with structures around the entrances to the churchyard.

== Buildings ==
Name and location	Photograph	Date	Notes
Faceby House; 54.42093°N 1.23618°W	—	1716	The house is in sandstone, and has a pantile roof with a stone ridge, copings, and large curved kneelers. There are two storeys and three wide bays. The central doorway has an old chamfered lintel, above it is a horizontally-sliding sash window, and the other windows are casements.
Meadowfield and outhouse 54.42184°N 1.23732°W	—	18th century	A house and cottage, later combined, in red brick, with stepped eaves courses forming corbels, and a pantile roof with slightly swept eaves, stone copings and square kneelers. There are two storeys and three bays. On the front is a rustic porch, the windows are horizontally-sliding sashes, and the ground floor openings have stone lintels. At the left is a small stone outhouse.
Wall east of Faceby Manor; 54.42888°N 1.23653°W	—	Late 18th or early 19th century	The garden wall is in red brick on a stone plinth, and has ramped stone coping. In the north part is a doorway with a round brick arch and a sloped buttress.
Faceby Manor and The Cottage; 54.42854°N 1.23662°W		Early 19th century	A large house that has been extended and divided, it is in rendered stone, with a sill band, a modillion eaves cornice, and a hipped Lakeland slate roof. There are two storeys, a main front of three bays, and five bays on the returns. In the centre is an Ionic porch distyle in antis, with a pediment, and the windows are sashes, some in architraves. At the rear on the left is an added cottage.
Fir Tree House and stable 54.42205°N 1.23757°W	—	Early to mid 19th century	A house and cottage, later combined, they are rendered and whitewashed, and have a Welsh slate roof with stone copings and kneelers. There are two storeys and four bays. The doorway has a fanlight, the windows are sashes, and all have architraves. The stable attached to the rear is in sandstone with a pantile roof, it has one storey and a loft and one bay, and contains a doorway and a loading door above.
St Mary Magdalene's Church; 54.42020°N 1.23788°W		1874–75	The church, which was extended in 1911 by Temple Moore, is in sandstone, the nave has a roof of purple slate with a tile ridge, and the chancel roof is in tile with courses of flagstones. It consists of a nave, a south porch, a chancel, and a north vestry, and at the east end is an undercroft. At the west end is a corbelled-out bellcote. Most of the windows are lancets, and in the north wall of the chancel is a Perpendicular window.
Faceby Manor Lodge; 54.43271°N 1.24184°W	—	c. 1900	The lodge is pebbledashed, and has stone dressings, quoins, and a hipped green slate roof. There is one storey and two bays. The central doorway has a rusticated architrave, and the windows are sashes with raised surrounds.
Gates, piers and overthrow south of St Mary Magdalene's Church; 54.42006°N 1.23790°W	—	1927	The main entrance to the churchyard is flanked by plain square sandstone gate piers with plinths and four-sided round-gabled tops. Between them are ornamental double wrought iron gates with scrolled decoration in the panels and along the curved top rail. The overthrow is scrolled, and has a cross finial and a hanging lantern. Outside the piers are short spur walls, the left with an inscription.
Gate and piers southeast of St Mary Magdalene's Church; 54.42011°N 1.23763°W	—	c. 1927	The side gate at the east end of the churchyard is flanked by two plain sandstone monolith gate piers. Between them is an ornamental wrought iron gate with scrolled panels and a top rail.
