= Middleton-on-Leven =

Hamlet and civil parish in North Yorkshire, England

Coordinates: 54°28′58″N 1°16′56″W

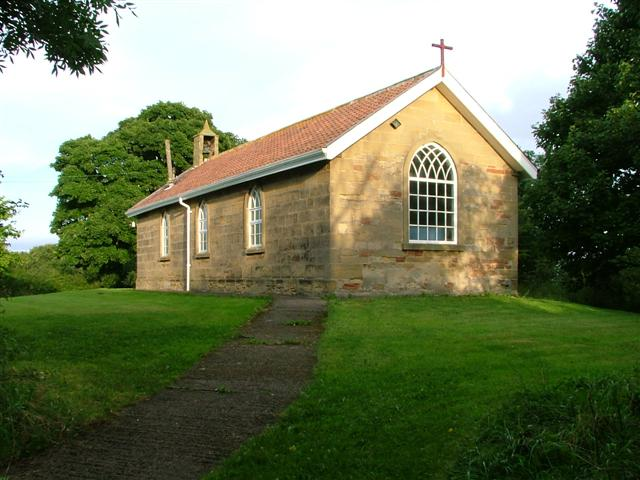
- St Cuthbert's Church, Middleton-on-Leven

- Location within North Yorkshire
- OS grid reference: NZ467099
- Civil parish: Middleton-on-Leven
- Unitary authority: North Yorkshire
- Ceremonial county: North Yorkshire
- Region: Yorkshire and the Humber
- Country: England
- Sovereign state: United Kingdom
- Post town: YARM
- Postcode district: TS15
- Police: North Yorkshire
- Fire: North Yorkshire
- Ambulance: Yorkshire

Middleton-on-Leven is a hamlet and civil parish 6 miles (10 km) south of Middlesbrough in North Yorkshire, England. At the 2011 Census, the population was less than 100, and was recorded with the civil parish of Rudby. In the 2001 census, the parish had a population of 97.

From 1974 to 2023 it was part of the Hambleton District, it is now administered by the unitary North Yorkshire Council.

== Geography ==
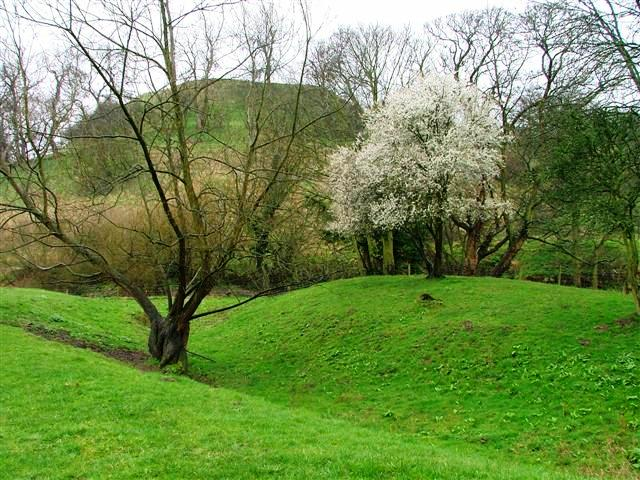
Castle Hill, Castle Levington

It is situated next to the River Leven, near the villages of Hilton (north), Seamer (east) Hutton Rudby (south). On the other side of the Leven is the town of Yarm at 4 miles (6.4 km) north-west and Kirklevington is west. Half a mile to the north-west at Castle Hill is the surviving motte of Castle Levington near the corresponding village.

== See also ==
- Listed buildings in Middleton-on-Leven
