= Bishop of Whitby =

Church of England clerical office

The Bishop of Whitby is an episcopal title used by a suffragan bishop of the Church of England Diocese of York, in the Province of York, England. The title takes its name after the town of Whitby in North Yorkshire; the See was erected under the Suffragans Nomination Act 1888 by Order in Council dated 30 July 1923. The Bishop of Whitby oversees the Archdeaconry of Cleveland.

Barry Hill is the Bishop of Whitby, having been consecrated 10 October 2024.

The Bishop of Whitby formerly had episcopal oversight of traditionalist parishes in the whole Diocese of York. Bates agreed not to ordain women and Ladds and Warner were both opponents of the ordination of women; however with the appointment of Ferguson, a supporter of women's ordination, oversight has been passed to the Bishop of Beverley, Stephen Race, (as PEV.)

== List of bishops ==
Bishops of Whitby
| From | Until | Incumbent | Notes |
|---|---|---|---|
| 1923 | 1939 | Henry Woollcombe | (1869–1941). Translated to Selby. |
| 1939 | 1947 | Harold Hubbard | (1883–1953). Retired. |
| 1947 | 1954 | Walter Baddeley | (1894–1960). Translated to Blackburn. |
| 1954 | 1961 | Philip Wheeldon | (1913–1992). Translated to Kimberley and Kuruman. |
| 1961 | 1972 | George Snow | (1907–1991). Retired. |
| 1972 | 1975 | John Yates | (1925–2008). Translated to Gloucester. |
| 1976 | 1983 | Clifford Barker | (1926–2017). Translated to Selby |
| 1983 | 1999 | Gordon Bates | (b. 1934). Retired. |
| 1999 | 2008 | Robert Ladds SSC | (b. 1941). Retired. |
| 2010 | 2012 | Martin Warner SSC | (b. 1958). Translated to Chichester in 2012. |
| October 2012 | December 2012 | Philip North, bishop-designate | (b. 1966) Withdrew acceptance. Later became Bishop of Burnley (2015–2023), Bishop-nominate of Sheffield (2017) and Bishop of Blackburn (2023– ). |
| 3 July 2014 | July 2024 | Paul Ferguson | (b. 1955) Retired. |
| 2024 | current | Barry Hill | (b. 1979) Consecrated on 10 October 2024 |
