= St Martin's Church, Seamer, Hambleton =

Anglican church in North Yorkshire, England

Coordinates: 54.4856°N 1.2321°W

St Martin's Church
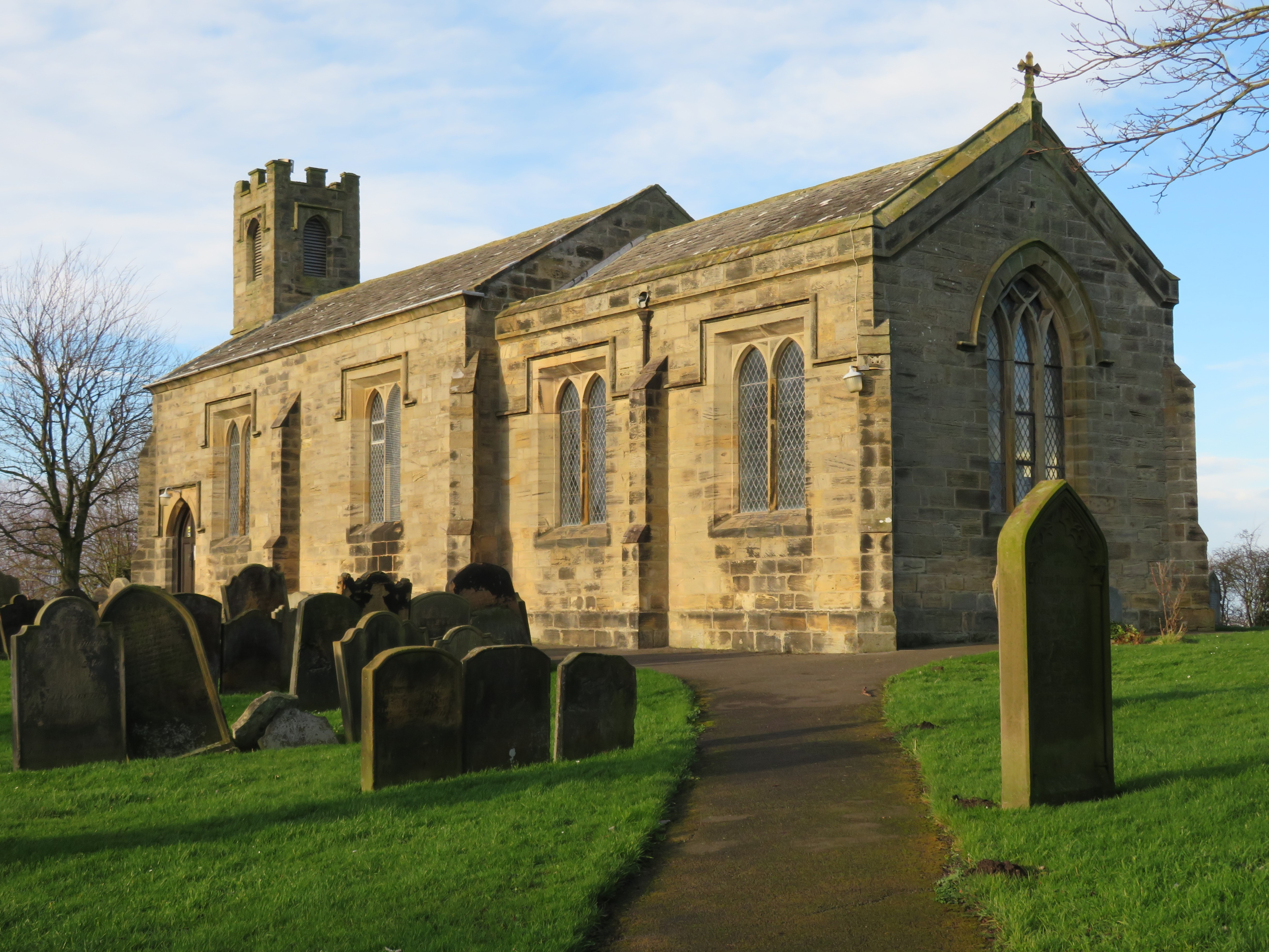
- The church in 2020
- OS grid reference: NZ 49840 10302
- Address: Hilton Rd, Seamer, Middlesbrough TS9 5LU
- Country: England
- Denomination: Church of England
- Website: www.stokesleyparishchurch.org.uk/st-martins-seamer/

St Martin's Church is the parish church of Seamer, a village near Stokesley in North Yorkshire, in England.

There was a medieval church in Seamer but it was entirely rebuilt in 1822, in a neo-Gothic style, with only some masonry in the north wall and one window surviving from the original building. The building was grade II listed in 1966.

The church is built of limestone and has a roof of Lakeland slate. It consists of a nave, a chancel and a slim west tower. The tower has two stages, single bell openings with hood moulds, and an embattled parapet. Along the body of the church are buttresses, paired lancet windows with hood moulds, and the east window has three lights and a pointed head. Inside, there is a font supported by a pillar claimed to have been looted from a church in Alexandria after the Battle of the Nile in 1798. There is also a marble tablet in memory of Stephen Attlay, who died in 1786.

== See also ==
- Listed buildings in Seamer, Hambleton
