= Wykeham, Ryedale =

Hamlet in North Yorkshire, England

Coordinates: 54.166133°N 0.752427°W

Wykeham
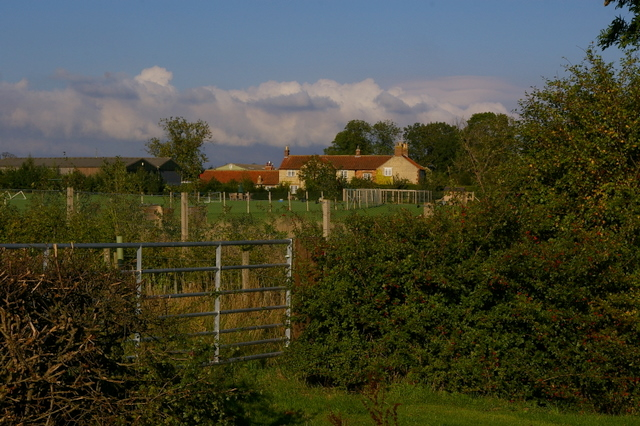
- Farm buildings and gardens at Wykeham

- Location within North Yorkshire
- OS grid reference: SE815752
- Civil parish: Malton
- Unitary authority: North Yorkshire
- Ceremonial county: North Yorkshire
- Region: Yorkshire and the Humber
- Country: England
- Sovereign state: United Kingdom
- Post town: MALTON
- Postcode district: YO17
- Police: North Yorkshire
- Fire: North Yorkshire
- Ambulance: Yorkshire
- UK Parliament: Thirsk and Malton

Wykeham is a hamlet in North Yorkshire, England. It is situated just off the A169 road and is 1.75 miles (2.82 km) north-east of Malton. Wykeham is mentioned in the Domesday Book as wicum, and the name of the hamlet derives from Old English and means [at] the dwellings.

Historically part of the Hundred of Maneshou, later the wapentake of Rydale, it is now part of the civil parish of Malton, and also part of the Thirsk and Malton Constituency. In 1301, the population of Wykeham and Howe was listed as being twelve, in the 2011 census, the population was included in that of Malton civil parish. From 1974 to 2023 it was part of the district of Ryedale, it is now administered by the unitary North Yorkshire Council.
