= St Cuthbert's Church, Middleton-on-Leven =

Church in North Yorkshire, England

Coordinates: 54°28′59″N 1°17′00″W

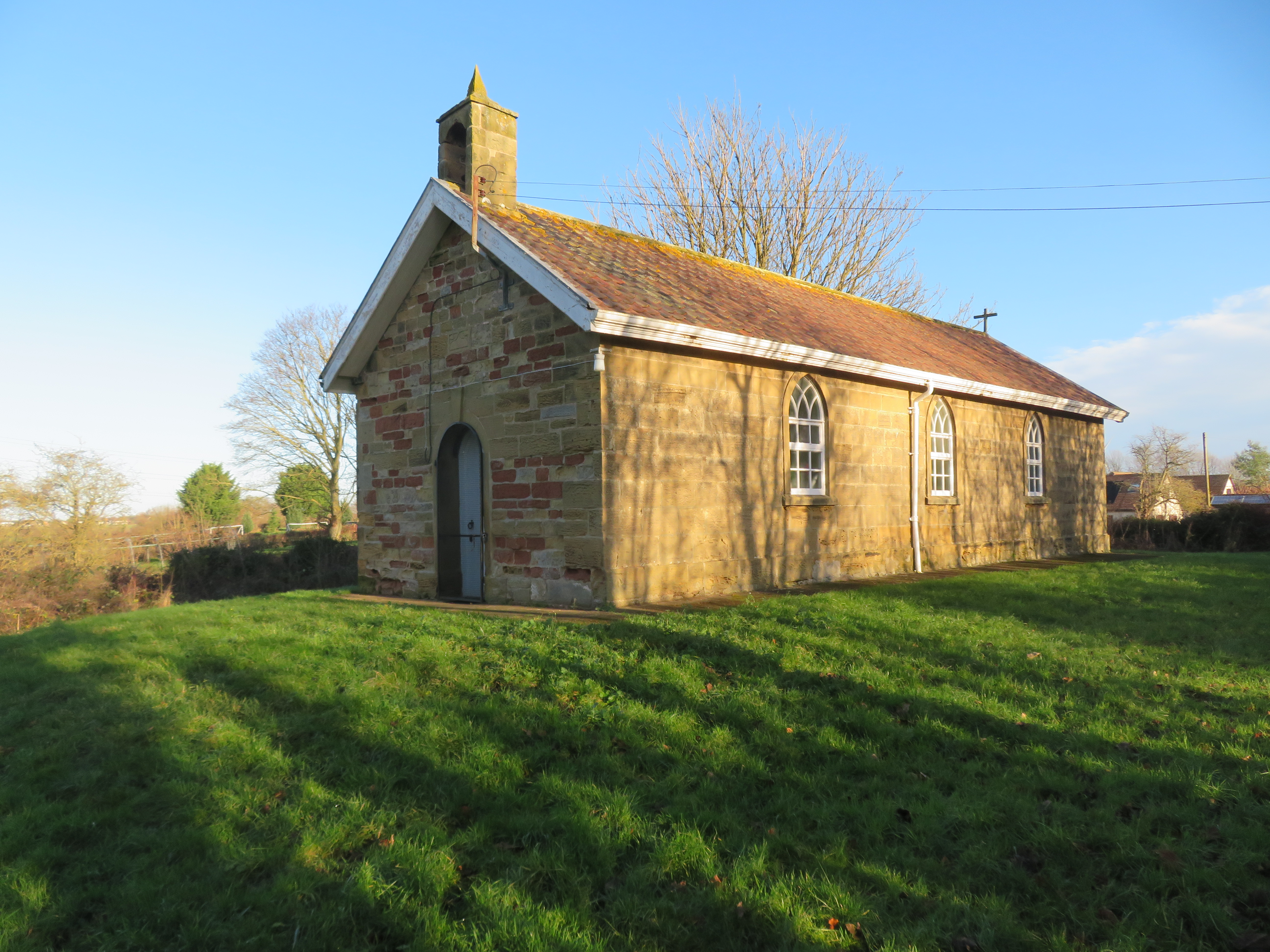
The church, in 2025

St Cuthbert's Church is the parish church of Middleton-on-Leven, a village in North Yorkshire, in England.

In the Mediaeval period, Middleton was in the parish of All Saints’ Church, Hutton Rudby. A chapel was built in Middleton in the later medieval period, certainly before 1483. In 1789, it was entirely rebuilt, on the same site, and reusing most of the original materials. The building was grade II listed in 1966.

The church is built of stone with a tile roof and boarded eaves. It consists of a nave and a chancel under one roof, and on the west gable is a bellcote, The west doorway has a rounded head and a keystone, and above it is a dated and initialled plaque. The windows have pointed arches. Inside, there is a triple arcade, which Nikolaus Pevsner suggests must be a much later addition.

== See also ==
- Listed buildings in Middleton-on-Leven
