= St Mary's Church, Askham Richard =

Church in York, England

Coordinates: 53.925475°N 1.18378°W

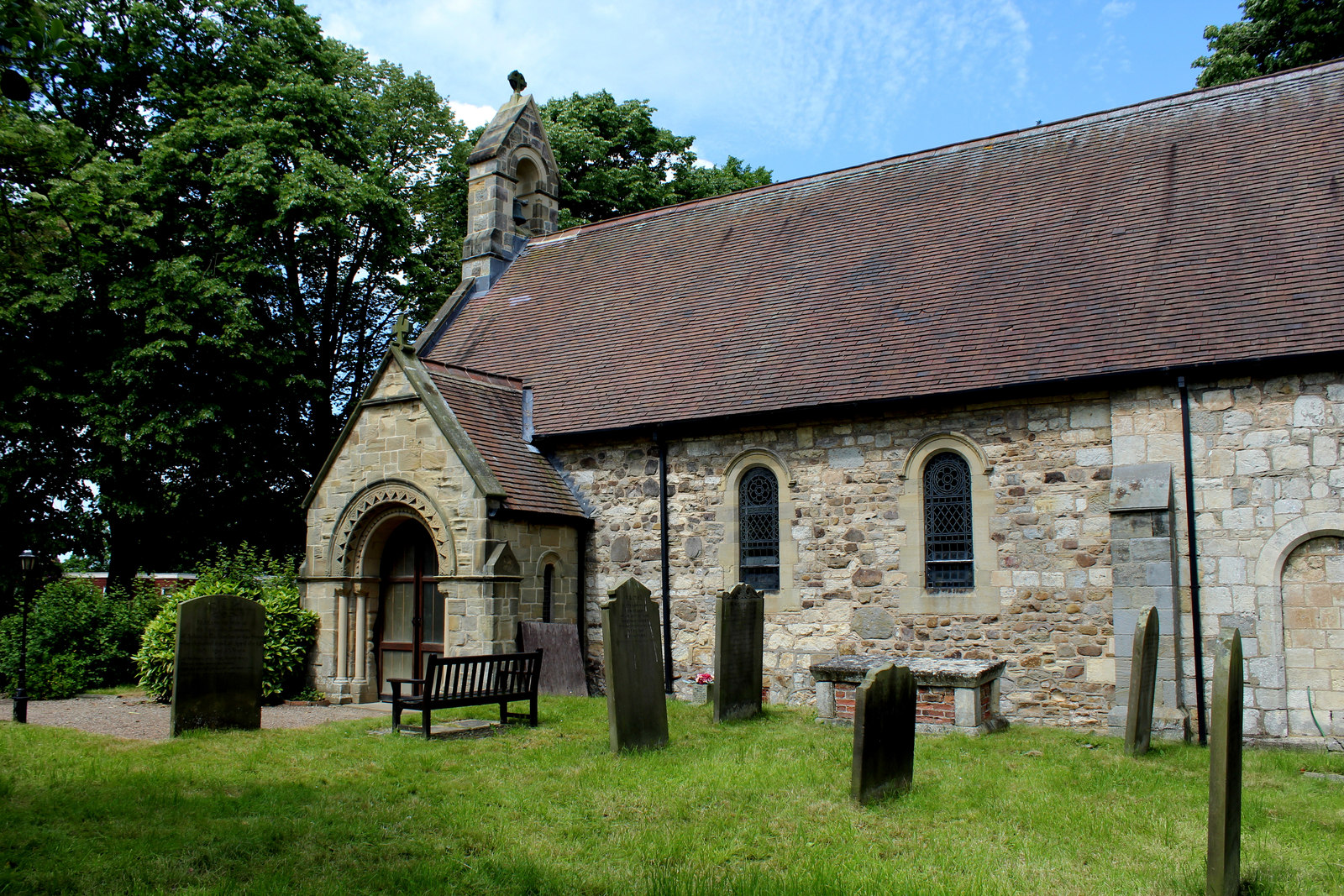
The church, in 2016

St Mary's Church is the parish church of Askham Richard, a village in the western, rural, part of the City of York in England.

The oldest part of the church is a Saxon doorway in the west wall of the vestry, but this was reassembled in the 19th century from parts found embedded in the north wall. The current church was built in the 12th century, with walls of limestone and sandstone. The south wall survives, with three windows, a doorway and a buttress. A porch was added in 1879, and this covers the entrance to another Norman doorway. This has a zigzag moulding, the teeth ornamented with leaves.

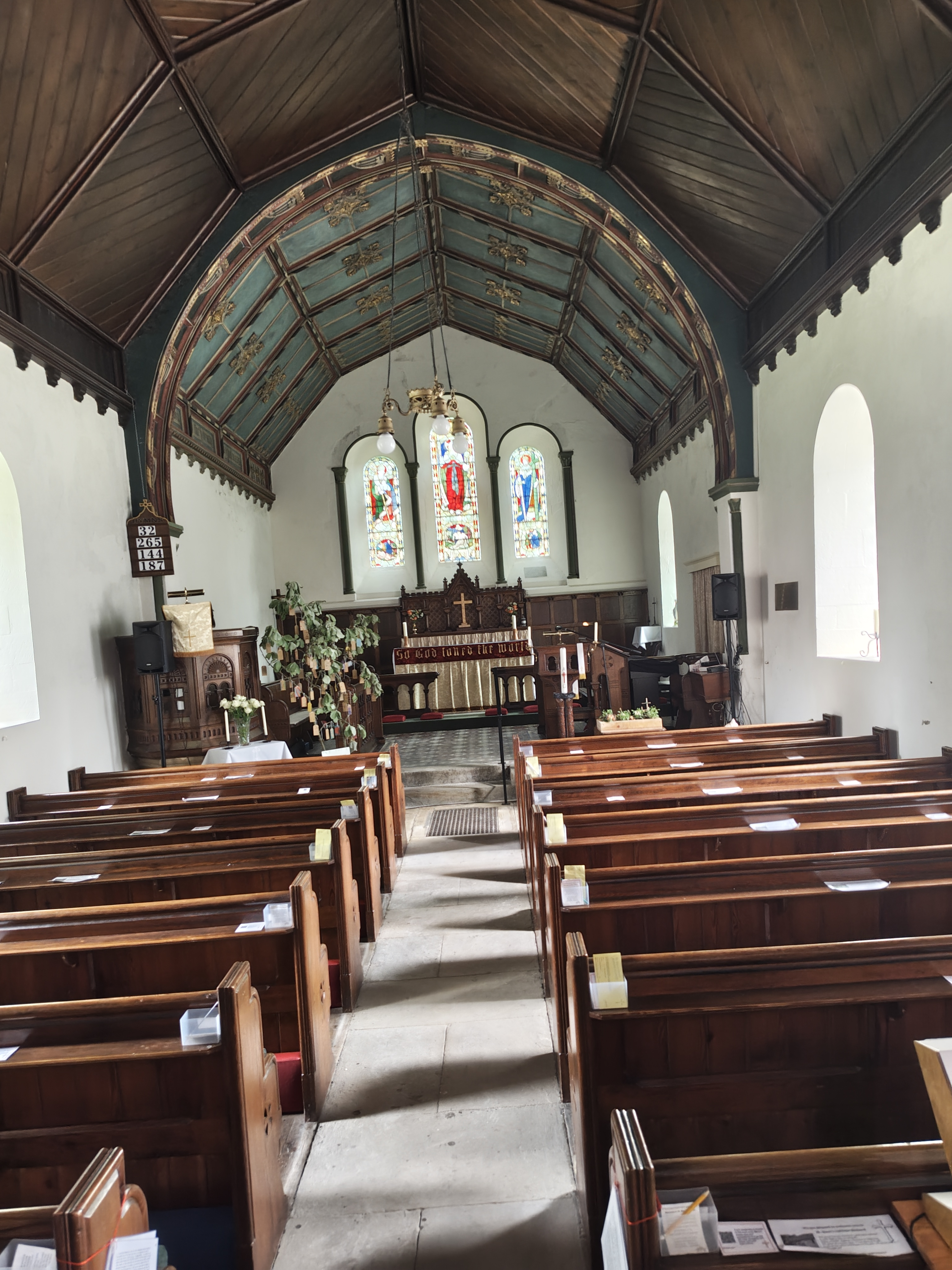
View from the nave into the chancel

In the 19th century, the north wall was rebuilt, the west gable was restored, and a vestry was added. In the west wall is a doorway with no ornament other than plain imposts, described by Nikolaus Pevsner as "very unusual". Atop the roof is a bell turret. Inside, there is no division between the nave and chancel. On the south side of the chancel, one window has stained glass, designed in 1879 by C. E. Kempe. The chancel ceiling dates from about 1890, and was designed by Temple Moore.

In the porch is a square stone cross base, decorated with a serpent design. It is believed to be Norman. The church plate includes a cup, made in York in 1687.

== See also ==
- Grade II* listed buildings in the City of York
- Listed buildings in Askham Richard
