= Rudby =

Village and civil parish in North Yorkshire, England

Coordinates: 54°27′24″N 1°16′31″W

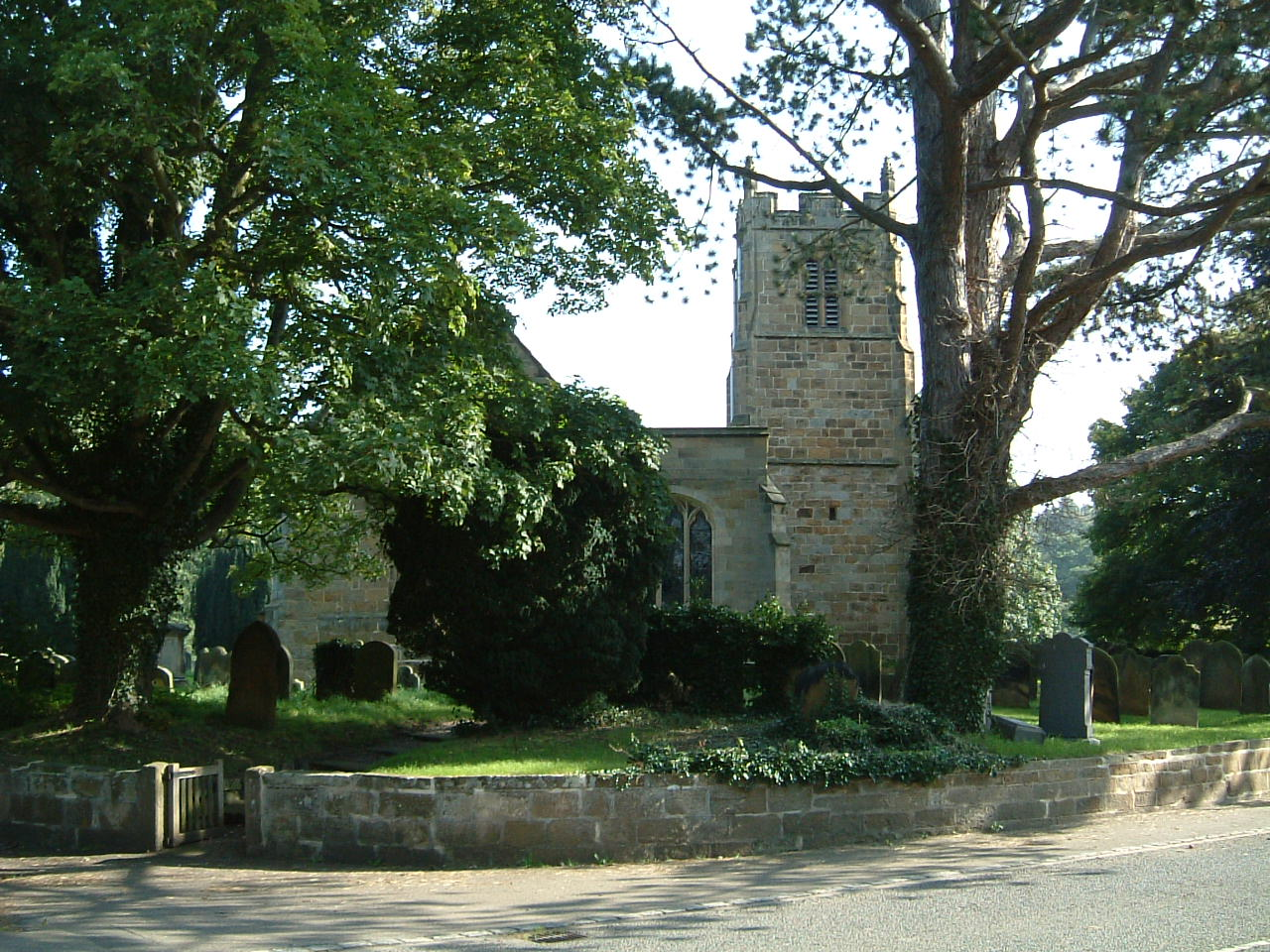
- All Saints' Church, Rudby

- Location within North Yorkshire
- Population: 396 (Including Middleton-on-Leven. 2011 census)
- OS grid reference: NZ471068
- Civil parish: Rudby
- Unitary authority: North Yorkshire
- Ceremonial county: North Yorkshire
- Region: Yorkshire and the Humber
- Country: England
- Sovereign state: United Kingdom
- Post town: YARM
- Postcode district: TS15
- Dialling code: 01642
- Police: North Yorkshire
- Fire: North Yorkshire
- Ambulance: Yorkshire

Rudby is a village and civil parish, 4 miles (6.4 km) from the market town of Stokesley in the county of North Yorkshire, England.

From 1974 to 2023 it was part of the Hambleton District, it is now administered by the unitary North Yorkshire Council.

== Geography ==
It is adjoined to another village called Hutton Rudby and it lies on the River Leven.

The parishes of Hutton Rudby, Middleton on Leven, Rudby and Skutterskelfe, since 2016, combined are part of the Rudby neighbourhood planning area.

== Governance ==
An electoral ward in the same name exists. This ward stretches east to Appleton Wiske and has a total population taken at the 2011 Census of 3,521.

== See also ==
- Listed buildings in Rudby

== Gallery ==
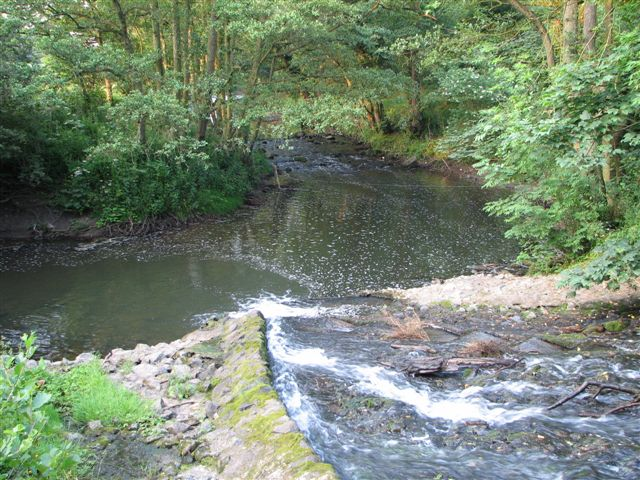
Coul Beck joining the River Leven just upstream from Rudby

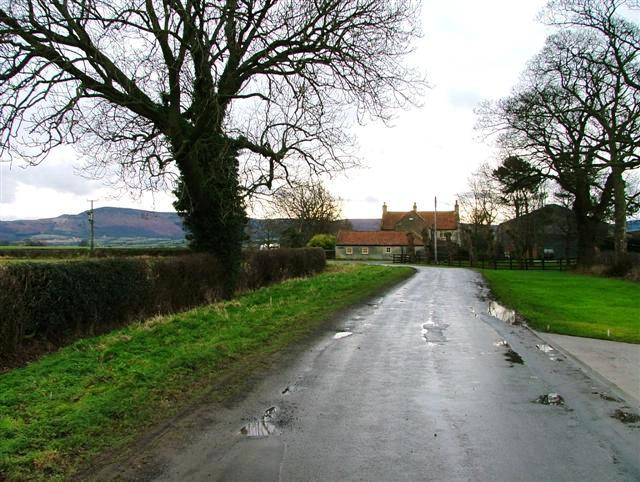
Sexhow Park Farm
