= St Mary Magdalene's Church, Faceby =

Church in North Yorkshire, England

Coordinates: 54.4202°N 1.2379°W

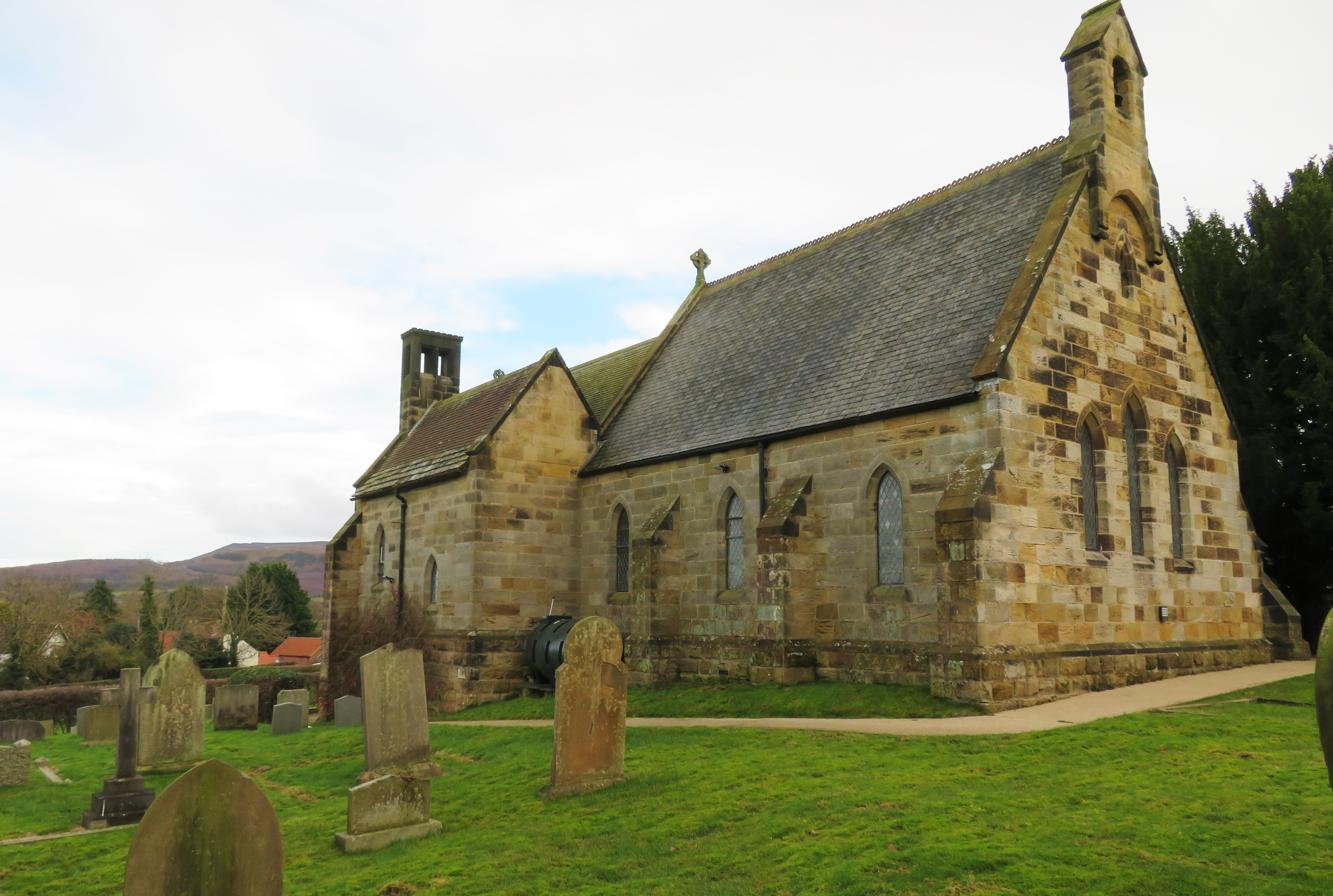
The church, in 2020

St Mary Magdalene's Church is an Anglican church in Faceby, a village in North Yorkshire, in England.

A church was built in Faceby in the 12th century. It was frequently altered, and by the mid-18th century was a rectangular structure, with a bellcote at the west end. The church was demolished in 1874, and a new building was completed on the same site in 1875. It was designed by Mr Falkenbridge of Whitby, and cost £1,000. The church was restored in 1911 by Temple Moore, who also extended the chancel. The building was grade II listed in 1966.

The church is built of sandstone, the nave has a roof of purple slate with a tile ridge, and the chancel roof is in tile with courses of flagstones. It consists of a nave, a south porch, a chancel, and a north vestry, and at the east end is an undercroft. At the west end is a corbelled-out bellcote. Most of the windows are lancets, and in the north wall of the chancel is a Perpendicular window. Inside, most of the 12th-century south doorway arch has been preserved, and there are some 12th-century carved stones in the chancel arch. The font is carved from a medieval column, while the other fittings are of 19th-century wood. The stained glass is by Charles Eamer Kempe.

== See also ==
- Listed buildings in Faceby
