= All Saints' Church, Rudby =

Church in Rudby, North Yorkshire, England

Coordinates: 54.4532°N 1.2737°W

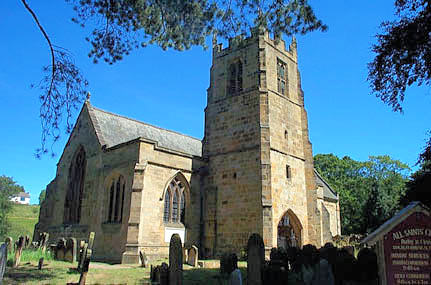
The church, in 2006

All Saints' Church is the parish church of Rudby, a village in North Yorkshire, in England.

A church was probably built in Rudby in the 12th century. It was rebuilt in the early 14th century, from which period the nave, south aisle and chancel survive. In the 15th century, the aisle was extended to the west, and a tower porch was added. The chancel was partly rebuilt in the 18th century, and the roofs were replaced, while the entire building was restored in 1892, the work including the replacement of most of the windows. The roofs were again replaced between 1923 and 1924, and the building was grade I listed in 1966.

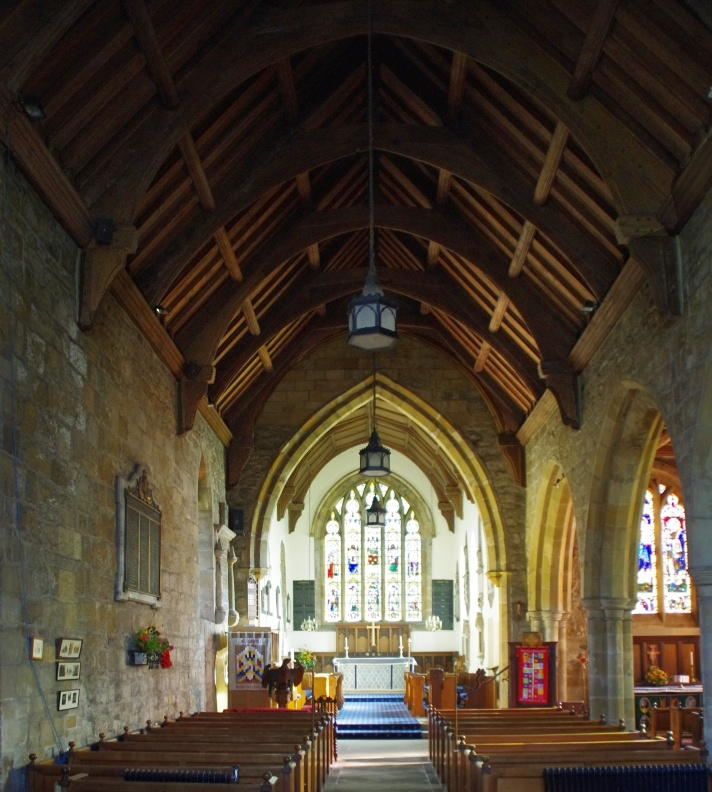
View from the nave into the chancel

The church is built of stone and has a Welsh slate roof. It consists of a nave, north and south aisles, a chancel, and a south tower porch. The tower has three stages, diagonal buttresses, two-light bell openings, and an embattled parapet with corner pinnacles. The Mediaeval west window survives, as does one window in the north aisle. Inside, the font has a 12th-century base, and there is a 14th-century tomb slab of a priest in the south aisle. There are assorted 18th- and 19th-century memorial tablets, and oak benches mostly dating from 1923 to 1924, although a few 17th-century benches survive.

== See also ==
- Grade I listed buildings in North Yorkshire (district)
- Listed buildings in Rudby
