= Paul Ferguson (bishop) =

British Anglican bishop

The Right Reverend Paul Ferguson FRCO
- Bishop of Whitby
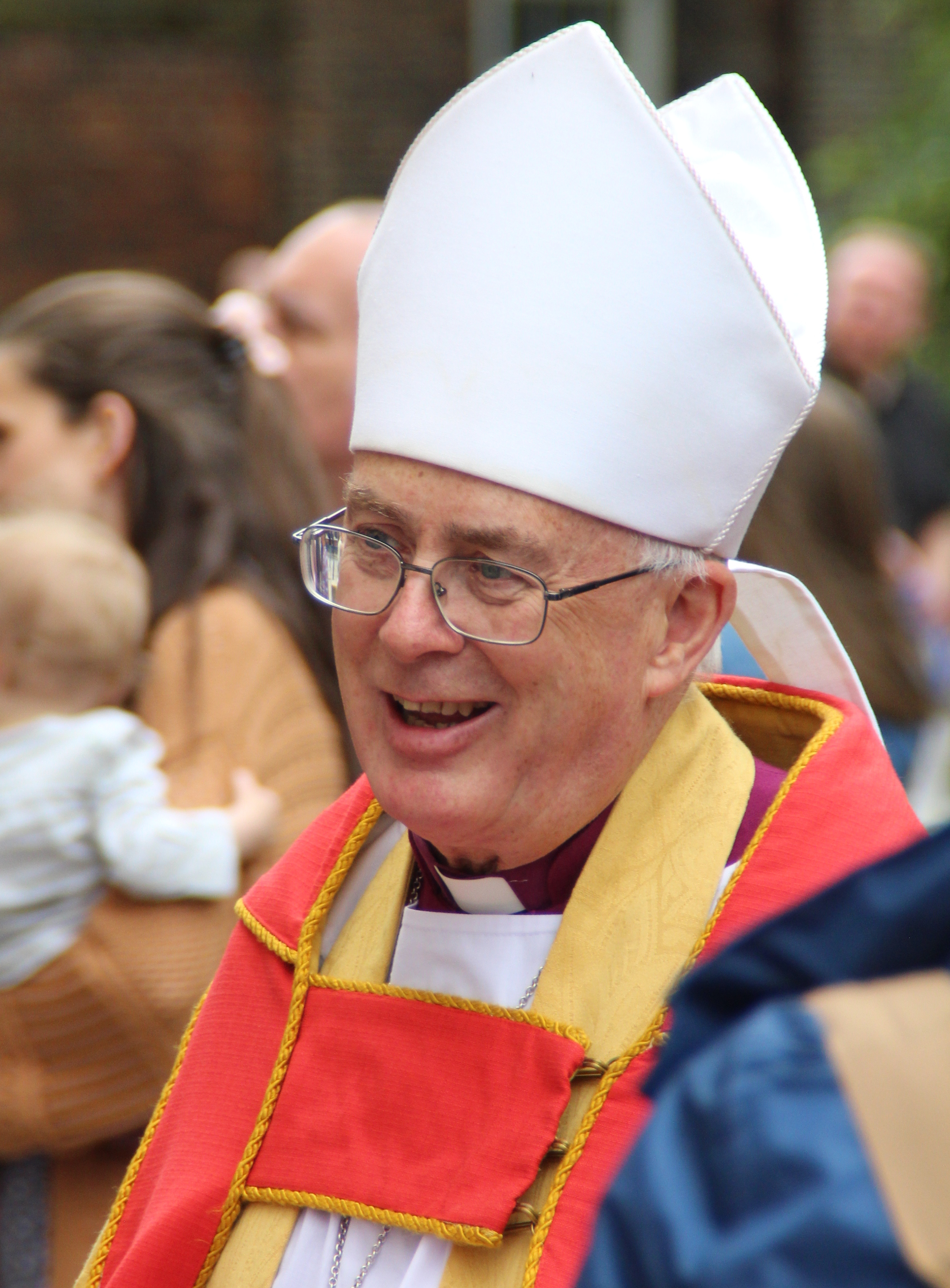
- Ferguson in 2024
- Church: Church of England
- Diocese: Diocese of York
- In office: 2014 to 2024
- Predecessor: Martin Warner
- Other post: Archdeacon of Cleveland (2001–2014)

Orders
- Ordination: 1985 (deacon); 1986 (priest)
- Consecration: 3 July 2014 by John Sentamu

Personal details
- Born: 13 July 1955 (age 71)
- Occupation: Organist and
- Education: New College, Oxford; Westminster College, Oxford; King's College, Cambridge; Westcott House, Cambridge

Paul John Ferguson FRCO (born 13 July 1955) is a British retired Anglican bishop. From 2014 to 2024, he was the Bishop of Whitby, a suffragan bishop in the Church of England's Diocese of York.

== Early life and education ==
Ferguson was born on 13 July 1955. He was educated at Birkenhead School, an independent school in Merseyside. Having been awarded an organ scholarship, he studied music at New College, Oxford, graduating with a Bachelor of Arts (BA) degree in 1976: as per tradition, his BA was promoted to a Master of Arts (MA Oxon) degree in 1980. He undertook teacher training at Westminster College, Oxford completing a Postgraduate Certificate in Education (PGCE). He returned to his former school as a teacher and organ player. He then returned to university, and studied theology at King's College, Cambridge while training for ordination at Westcott House, Cambridge, a Liberal Anglo-Catholic theological college. He graduated with a further BA in 1984.

== Ordained ministry ==
Ferguson was made a deacon at Petertide 1985 (30 June), by Ronald Brown, Bishop of Birkenhead, at St Mary-without-the-Walls, Chester, and ordained a priest the Petertide following (29 June 1986), by Michael Baughen, Bishop of Chester, at Chester Cathedral. After a curacy at St Mary, Chester he was Curate, Chaplain, Sacrist and Precentor at Westminster Abbey from 1988 to 1995. After this he was Precentor and a Residentiary Canon at York Minster until his appointment as Archdeacon of Cleveland in 2001.

=== Episcopal ministry ===
He was consecrated at York Minster on 3 July 2014 by John Sentamu, Archbishop of York. In the vacancy in See between the retirement of Sentamu and the confirmation of Stephen Cottrell, Ferguson was acting diocesan bishop. He retired in July 2024.

Since his retirement, Ferguson has functioned as honorary assistant priest, both at Mass and Evensong at St Lawrence's Church, York, a traditional anglo-catholic and Prayer Book parish church, and also at Selby Abbey and surrounding villages.

== Personal life ==
In 1982, Ferguson married Penelope Hewitt-Jones, cousin of the composer Thomas Hewitt Jones. Together they had one daughter and two sons. His wife predeceased him in 2022. In 2024 he married Bridget Gillespie.
