= Deighton, North Yorkshire =

Village and civil parish in North Yorkshire, England

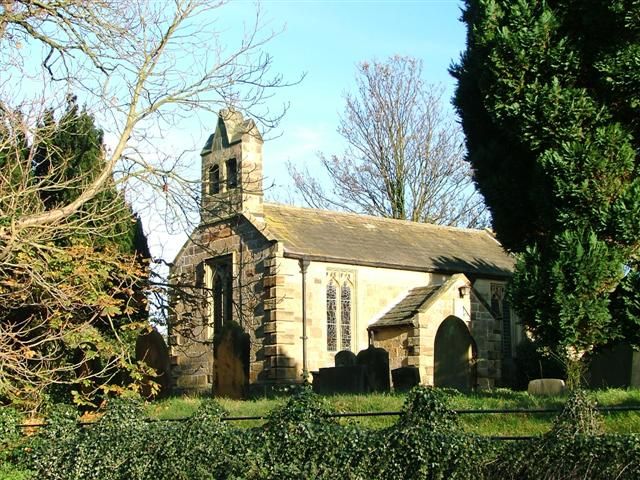
All Saints' Church, Deighton

Deighton is a village and civil parish in the county of North Yorkshire, England. It is about 6 miles (9.7 km) north of Northallerton and near the A167 road.

From 1974 to 2023 it was part of the Hambleton District, it is now administered by the unitary North Yorkshire Council.

In the 2011 census, the population of Deighton (including Little Smeaton and Birkby) was 168.

A moated site at grid reference NZ379017 in Deighton is a scheduled ancient monument.

Deighton contains two listed buildings that are recorded in the National Heritage List for England. Both the listed buildings are designated at Grade II, the lowest of the three grades, which is applied to "buildings of national importance and special interest". The listed buildings are both in the village, and consist of a church and a tombstone in the churchyard.

== Buildings ==
Name and location	Photograph	Date	Notes
All Saints' Church; 54.41006°N 1.41408°W		1715	The church incorporates earlier material, and it was partly rebuilt in 1901, including removal of the tower. The church consists of a nave with a south porch, and a lower chancel with a north vestry. At the west end is a gableted bellcote with two arched openings. The porch is gabled, with rusticated quoins, and a round-arched entrance with a dated and initialled keystone. The inner doorway is also round-arched, and has a chamfered surround. The windows are in Perpendicular style, and at the east end is a three-light window with a hood mould.
Tombstone; 54.40989°N 1.41412°W	—	Early to mid 18th century	The tombstone is in the churchyard of All Saints' Church to the south of the porch. It is in stone, and consists of a rectangular slab with a shaped top. On it is a raised shaped panel surrounded by an eared architrave with carved garlands, and in the shaped top are leaf motifs.
