= Roxby, North Yorkshire =

Village and civil parish in North Yorkshire, England

Coordinates: 54°32′07″N 0°49′29″W

Roxby
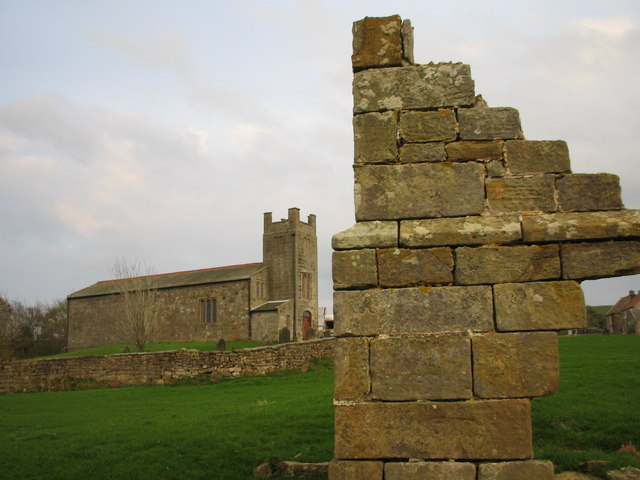
- St Nicholas's Church, Roxby, and in right foreground the ruined corner which is all that remains visible of the 13th-century Roxby Hall

- Location within North Yorkshire
- Population: 120 (2014)
- OS grid reference: NZ762161
- Civil parish: Roxby
- Unitary authority: North Yorkshire
- Ceremonial county: North Yorkshire
- Region: Yorkshire and the Humber
- Country: England
- Sovereign state: United Kingdom
- Post town: SALTBURN-BY-THE-SEA
- Postcode district: TS13
- Police: North Yorkshire
- Fire: North Yorkshire
- Ambulance: Yorkshire
- UK Parliament: Scarborough and Whitby

Roxby (formerly Rousby) is a village and civil parish in the county of North Yorkshire, England. It is located near Staithes.

The population of the civil parish was estimated at 120 in 2014, about the same as the 2001 UK census figure of 119.

Roxby was historically a township in the parish of Hinderwell in the North Riding of Yorkshire. It became a separate civil parish in 1866.

From 1974 to 2023 it was part of the Borough of Scarborough, it is now administered by the unitary North Yorkshire Council.

The name Roxby derives from the Old Norse Rauthrsbȳ meaning 'Rauthr's village'.

St Nicholas' Church, Roxby was built in the 17th century on the site of an earlier church. It is a Grade II listed building. It includes family tombs of the Boynton baronets.

== See also ==
- Listed buildings in Roxby, North Yorkshire
