= Coneysthorpe =

Village and civil parish in North Yorkshire, England

Coordinates: 54°08′00″N 0°54′42″W

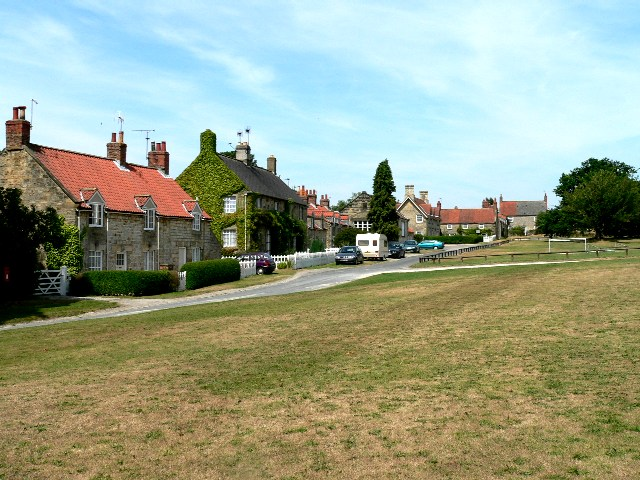

- Location within North Yorkshire
- Population: 120 (2011 census)
- OS grid reference: SE712712
- Civil parish: Coneysthorpe
- Unitary authority: North Yorkshire
- Ceremonial county: North Yorkshire
- Region: Yorkshire and the Humber
- Country: England
- Sovereign state: United Kingdom
- Post town: YORK
- Postcode district: YO60
- Police: North Yorkshire
- Fire: North Yorkshire
- Ambulance: Yorkshire
- UK Parliament: Thirsk and Malton

Coneysthorpe is a small village and civil parish in North Yorkshire, England. It is situated near Castle Howard and 4 miles (6.4 km) west of Malton. The Centenary Way long-distance path runs through the village.

From 1974 to 2023 it was part of the district of Ryedale, it is now administered by the unitary North Yorkshire Council.

The name Coneysthorpe derives from the Old Danish kunung meaning 'king' and the Old Norse þorp meaning 'secondary settlement'.

Coneysthorpe Chapel, built in 1835, lies in the village.

== Notable people ==
- Richard Spruce (1817–1893), botanist

== See also ==
- Listed buildings in Coneysthorpe
