= Faceby =

Village and civil parish in North Yorkshire, England

Coordinates: 54°25′17″N 1°14′12″W

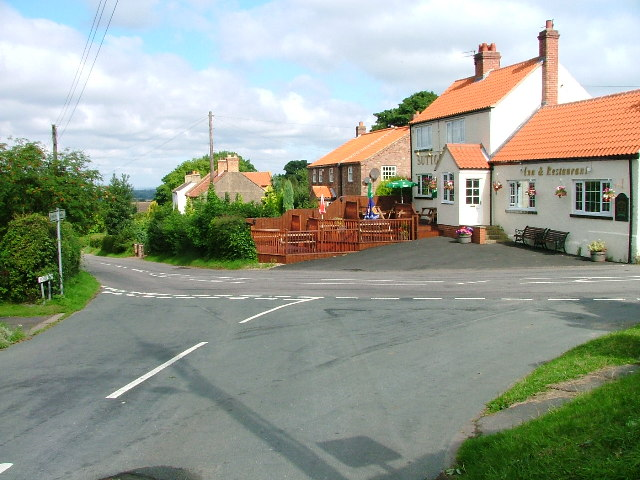
- Faceby village

- Location within North Yorkshire
- Population: 188 (2011 census)
- OS grid reference: NZ496031
- Civil parish: Faceby
- Unitary authority: North Yorkshire
- Ceremonial county: North Yorkshire
- Region: Yorkshire and the Humber
- Country: England
- Sovereign state: United Kingdom
- Post town: MIDDLESBROUGH
- Postcode district: TS9
- Dialling code: 01642
- Police: North Yorkshire
- Fire: North Yorkshire
- Ambulance: Yorkshire

Faceby is a small village and civil parish in North Yorkshire, England. It is at the north-west corner of the North York Moors and near Stokesley.

== Overview ==
The village is located on the north-western edge of the North York Moors National Park and is 0.6 miles (1 km) south of the A172 road, and is 3.7 miles (6 km) from the A19 to the west and 3.7 miles (6 km) from Stokesley to the north-east.

The name of the village derives from the Old Norse meaning "Feit's Settlement", with Feit being a personal name. It has one pub (The Sutton Arms), a village hall, and the 12th century St Mary Magdalene's Church, Faceby. Buses run to Northallerton and Stokesley three or four times a day.

From 1974 to 2023 it was part of the Hambleton District, it is now administered by the unitary North Yorkshire Council.

== See also ==
Listed buildings in Faceby
