= All Saints' Church, Deighton =

Church in Deighton, North Yorkshire, England

Coordinates: 54°24′36″N 1°24′51″W

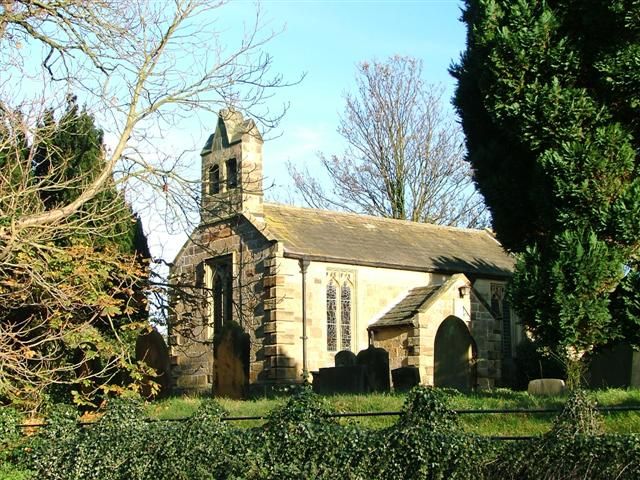
The church, in 2005

All Saints' Church is an Anglican church in Deighton, a village near Northallerton in North Yorkshire, in England.

There was a Mediaeval chapel of ease in Deighton, in the parish of All Saints' Church, Northallerton. The current building was constructed in 1715, with a 17th-century window relocated to the vestry. The east window was inserted in the 19th century, then in 1901, the church was largely rebuilt by William Searle Hicks and Henry Clement Charlewood, the work including the removal of the tower. The building was grade II listed in 1970.

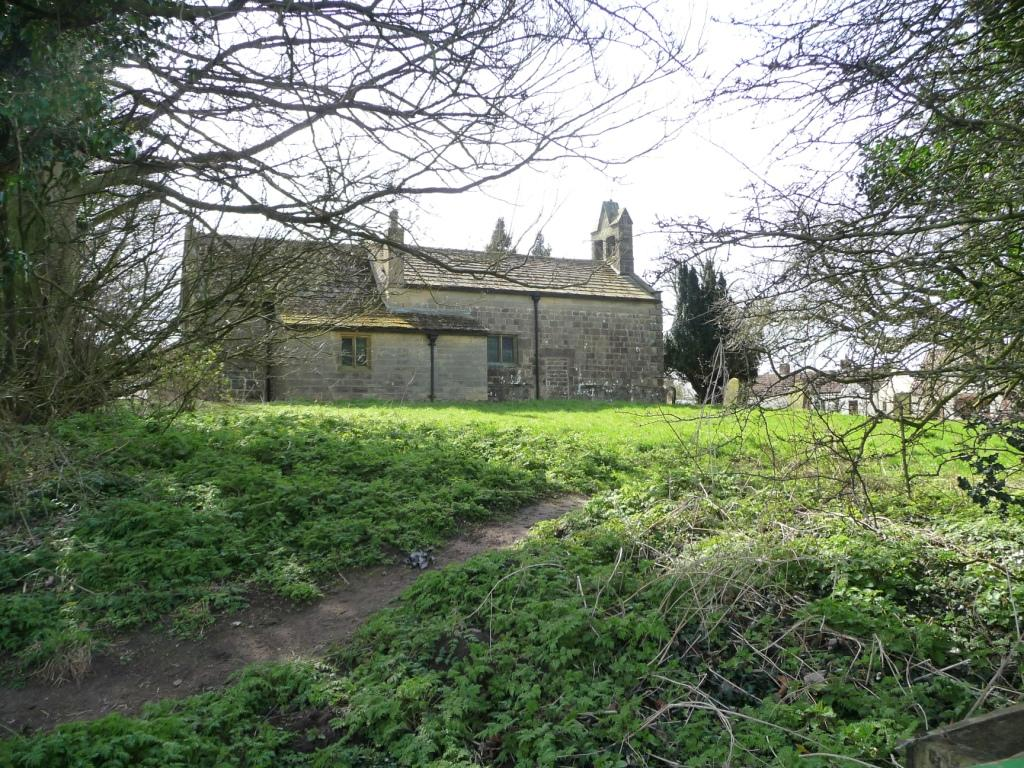
The church, from the northeast

The church consists of a nave with a south porch, and a lower chancel with a north vestry. At the west end is a gableted bellcote with two arched openings. The porch is gabled, with rusticated quoins, and a round-arched entrance with a dated and initialled keystone. The inner doorway is also round-arched, and has a chamfered surround. The windows are in Perpendicular style, and at the east end is a three-light window with a hood mould. Inside the church is a round Norman font and a 17th-century wooden pulpit.

== See also ==
- Listed buildings in Deighton, Hambleton
