= St Nicholas' Church, Roxby =

Church in Roxby, North Yorkshire, England

Coordinates: 54.5367°N 0.8257°W

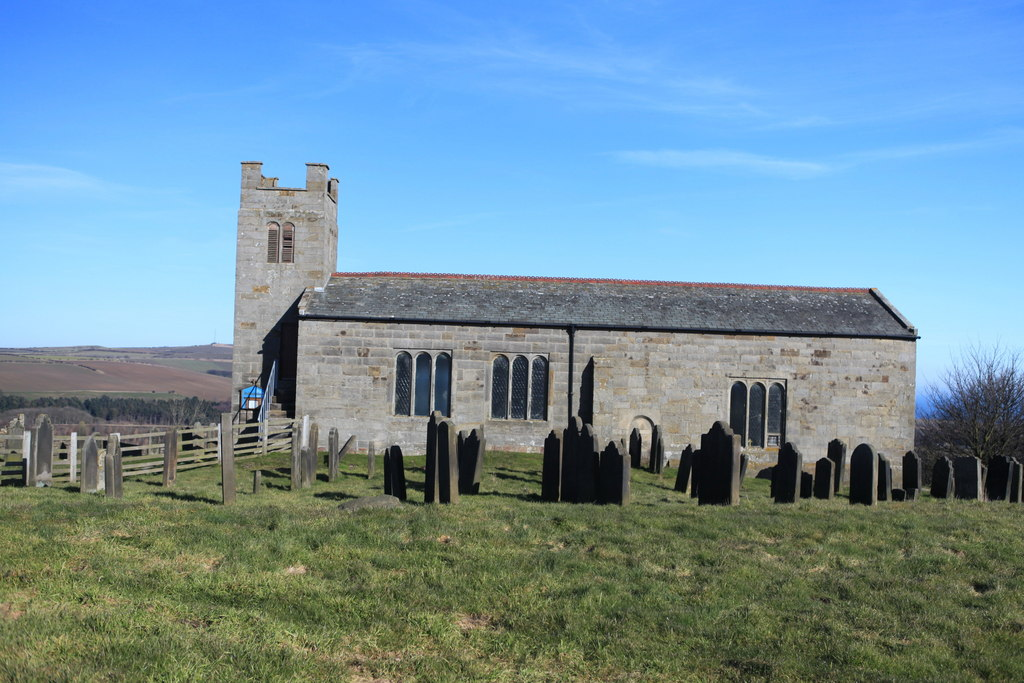
The church, in 2010

St Nicholas' Church is the parish church of Roxby, North Yorkshire, a village in England.

Roxby has a chapel of ease in the parish of St Hilda's Church, Hinderwell from the Mediaeval period, which was rebuilt for Thomas Boynton in about 1520. The current church was constructed in the 17th century, and was largely rebuilt in 1818. The building was restored in the early 20th century, and was grade II listed in 1990.

The church is built of sandstone with a Lakeland slate roof. It consists of a nave and a chancel in one unit, and a west tower. The tower has three stages, and contains a round-arched west doorway with voussoirs, above which is a two-light west window, two-light segmental-headed bell openings, and a parapet with corner battlements. The east window has five lights and a large keystone, and probably dates from the 20th century restoration. The wooden pews and pulpit probably date from 1818. There is a brass memorial to Boynton and two 17th-century graveslabs, along with a 13th-century font on a modern base.

== See also ==
- Listed buildings in Roxby, North Yorkshire
