= Coneysthorpe Chapel =

Historic chapel in Coneysthorpe, North Yorkshire, England

Coordinates: 54.1337°N 0.9117°W

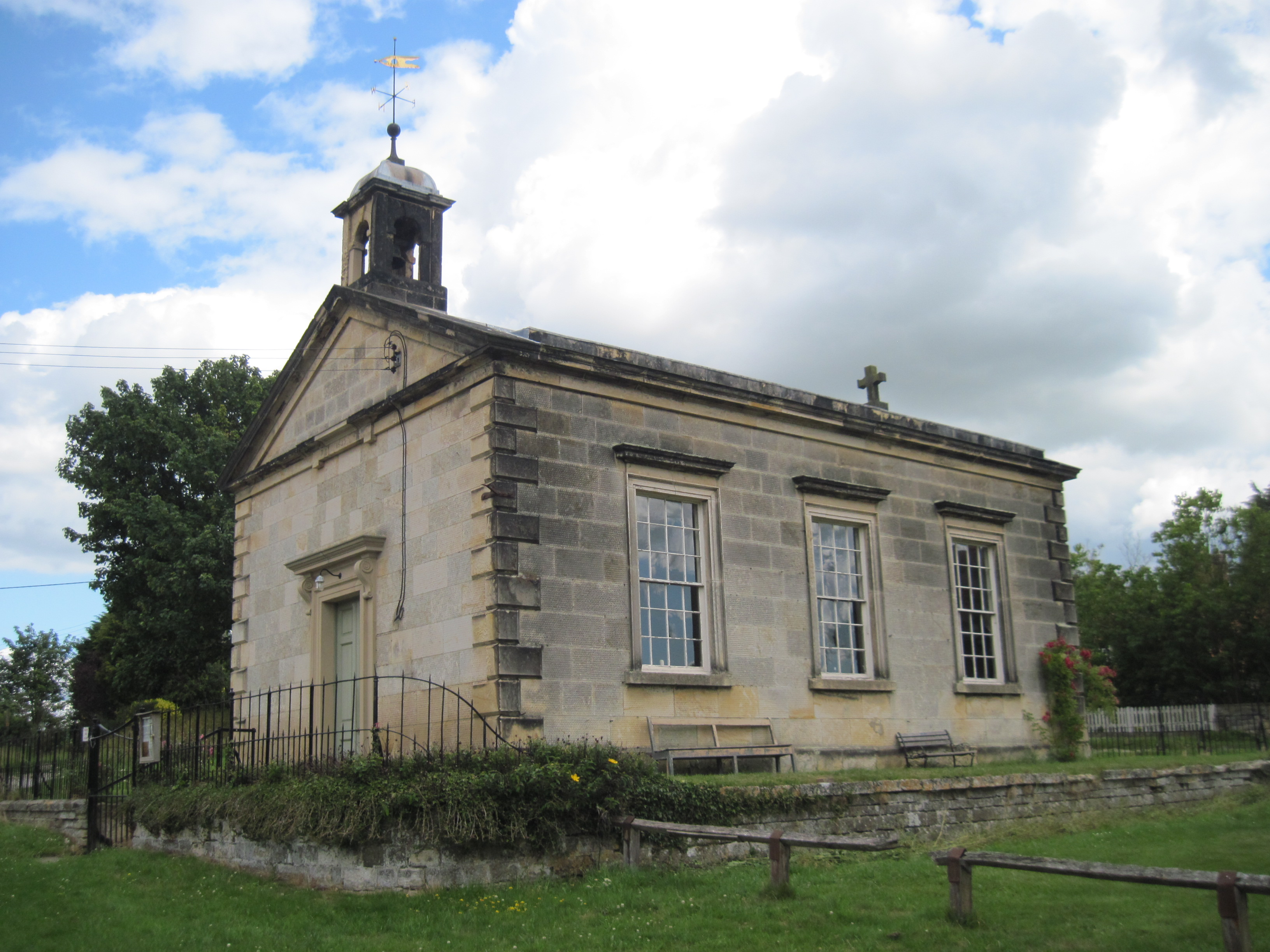
The chapel, in 2010

Coneysthorpe Chapel is a historic chapel in Coneysthorpe, a village in North Yorkshire, in England.

The church was constructed in 1835, as a chapel-of-ease to St Michael's Church, Barton-le-Street. The furnishings were designed in 1894, by Temple Moore. The building was Grade II listed in 1954. In 2010, the church celebrated its 175th anniversary by reviving the tradition of holding a bread loaf feast on Lammas Day.

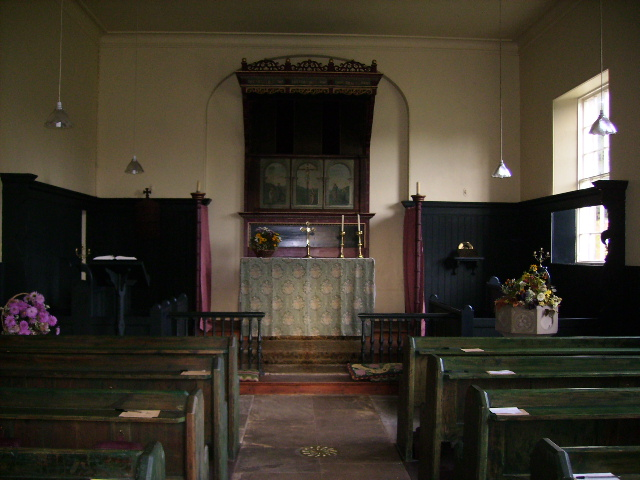
Interior view, in 2006

The chapel is in the Georgian style. It is built of limestone on a plinth, with quoins, a moulded cornice with a datestone and a pediment, and a Welsh slate roof. On the roof is a bell turret with round-arched openings, imposts and keystones, and a domed roof with a ball finial and a weathervane. At the west end are double doors in a moulded architrave, and a hood on consoles. On the south side are sash windows with moulded architraves and hoods, on the north side is a vestry, and at the east end is a sash window with a wedge lintel and a keystone. Inside, the pews, dado, lectern, altar rail and reredos are all by Temple Moore, and there is an octagonal font.

== See also ==
- Listed buildings in Coneysthorpe
