= Seamer, Hambleton =

Village and civil parish in North Yorkshire, England

Coordinates: 54.485150°N 1.231520°W

Seamer
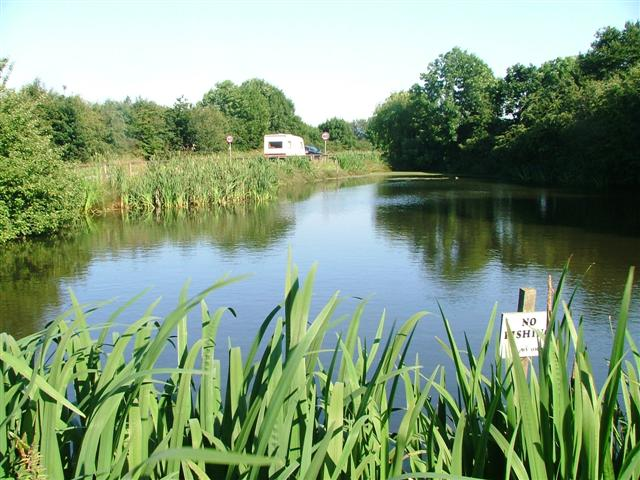
- The village pond in Seamer

- Location within North Yorkshire
- Population: 566 (2011 census)
- OS grid reference: NZ498102
- Civil parish: Seamer
- Unitary authority: North Yorkshire
- Ceremonial county: North Yorkshire
- Region: Yorkshire and the Humber
- Country: England
- Sovereign state: United Kingdom
- Post town: MIDDLESBROUGH
- Postcode district: TS9
- Police: North Yorkshire
- Fire: North Yorkshire
- Ambulance: Yorkshire

Seamer is a village and civil parish in the county of North Yorkshire, England, near the border with the Borough of Stockton-on-Tees and 2 miles (3 km) northwest of Stokesley. According to the 2011 census, the population of the village was 566, which North Yorkshire County Council estimated had dropped to 560 by 2015.

From 1974 to 2023 it was part of the Hambleton District, it is now administered by the unitary North Yorkshire Council.

Its name is first attested in the Domesday Book of 1086 as Semer(s), with later medieval attestations including Samara. The first element is Old English sǣ 'lake'; the spelling of the second element suggests variation between Old English mere 'sea', Old English mersc 'marsh', and Old Norse marr 'lake, sea, pool'. The dominant meaning of the name therefore seems to have been 'lake by the sea'.

This rural village supports a small farming community. There are two churches in the village, a Methodist chapel and the Anglican St Martin's Church. St Martin's is an 1822 rebuild of a medieval church, which was located in the same place. It still retains some 14th-century stained glass and is now grade II listed. The village also has the King's Head pub, and a duck pond on the village green.

== See also ==
- Listed buildings in Seamer, Hambleton
