= Thornton-le-Beans =

Village and civil parish in North Yorkshire, England

Coordinates: 54.30841°N 1.39047°W

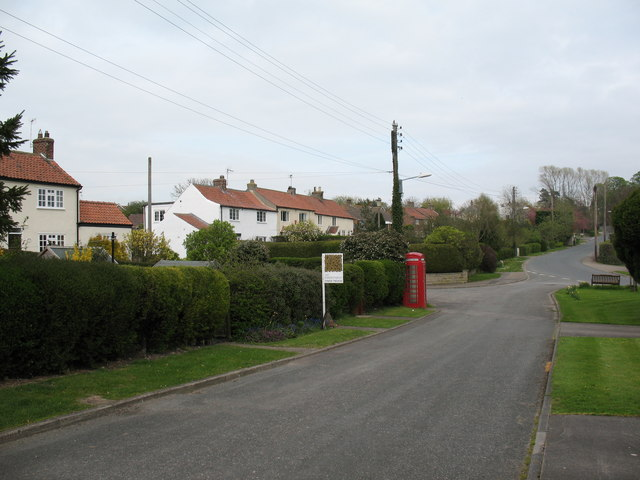
- Village street, Thornton-le-Beans

- Location within North Yorkshire
- Population: 255 (including Crosby. 2011 census)
- OS grid reference: SE397904
- Unitary authority: North Yorkshire
- Ceremonial county: North Yorkshire
- Region: Yorkshire and the Humber
- Country: England
- Sovereign state: United Kingdom
- Post town: NORTHALLERTON
- Postcode district: DL6
- Dialling code: 01609
- Police: North Yorkshire
- Fire: North Yorkshire
- Ambulance: Yorkshire
- UK Parliament: Richmond and Northallerton

Thornton-le-Beans is a village and civil parish in North Yorkshire, England. It is on the A168 road and 3 miles (4.8 km) south of Northallerton.

The village is currently in the Thirsk and Malton Parliamentary constituency, whose incumbent is Kevin Hollinrake.

From 1974 to 2023 it was part of the Hambleton District, it is now administered by the unitary North Yorkshire Council.

The village has one pub called The Crosby behind which there is a campsite. There is a Methodist Chapel at the east end of the village and a Chapel of Ease at the west end. The graveyard looks over the Vale of York. The author Bill Bryson famously stated in his book Notes From a Small Island that he wants to be buried in Thornton-le-Beans, due to the oddness of the name.

== Etymology ==
The town's odd name is derived from the common place name 'Thornton', meaning a farm with thorn bushes. This farm had beans grown upon it. In 1534 it was called Thornton-in-Fabis, the Latin for Thornton-le-Beans.

== See also ==
- Listed buildings in Thornton-le-Beans
