= Grinkle Mine =

Former ironstone mine in North Yorkshire, England

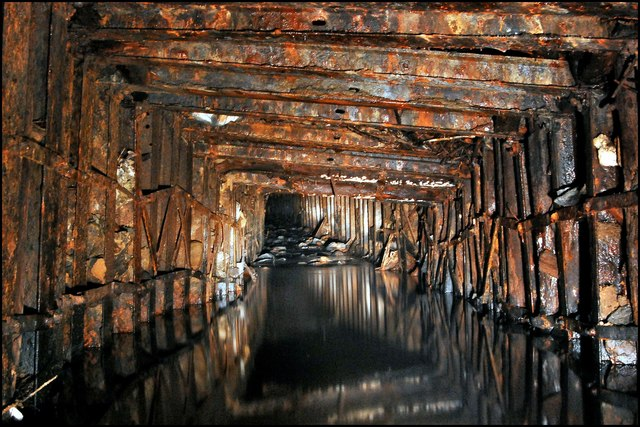
- Grinkle Mine culvert

- Location within North Yorkshire
- Location: Roxby, North Yorkshire, England; 54.5491°N 0.8240°W
- Products: Ironstone
- Production: 4,000 tonnes (4,400 tons)
- Financial year: 1929
- Opened: 1875
- Closed: 1934

Grinkle Mine, was an ironstone mine working the main Cleveland Seam near to Roxby in North Yorkshire, England. Initially, the ironstone was mined specifically for the furnaces at the Palmer Shipbuilders in Jarrow on the River Tyne, but later, the mine became independent of Palmers. To enable the output from the mine to be exported, a 3-mile (4.8 km) narrow-gauge tramway was constructed that ran across three viaducts and through two tunnels to the harbour of Port Mulgrave, where ships would take the ore directly to Tyneside.

During the First World War, the threat of wartime action on the harbour at Port Mulgrave led to a connection being built from the mine site direct to the Whitby to Loftus railway line just to the north of the mine head. Whilst this allowed for the closure of the port to shipping in 1917, the tramway stayed open to transport miners from Port Mulgrave to the minesite. The mine first ceased production in 1921, with sporadic years of mining taking place, however the mine closed for good in 1930. Part of the site is now underneath the surface workings of the Boulby Mine complex, though some buildings remain at ground level.

== History ==
In 1852, Charles Mark Palmer entered into a business venture with his brother, George, to build ships at Jarrow (Palmers Shipbuilding and Iron Company), on the south bank of the River Tyne in County Durham. (Note: Jarrow is now in Tyne and Wear.) As the company installed their own blast furnaces at the shipyard, iron ore needed to be sourced, and a licence was obtained to mine for ironstone in the vicinity of Easington and Boulby on the Yorkshire coast, which had not been mined for iron before this time, but small scale quarrying of ironstone had taken place before in coastal regions. Initially, ore was mined around the Port Mulgrave area which necessitated the building of a port there. (Note: The area around Port Mulgrave was known as Rosedale. When the ironstone industry at Rosedale in the North York Moors started operating, it was decided to rename the area at the coast as Port Mulgrave after the local landowners.) Iron was dug from the cliffs, and loaded directly into ships in the port underneath the workings, at first on a wooden jetty, which was later replaced by a stone one.

Since 1864, the Palmers had been buying up land in the area of Staithes when it became available. They purchased the Grinkle Estate, the Seaton Estate and other pockets of land in what was known as the Rosedale area. In 1875, the company moved into a new mine, named Grinkle after the estate it was located on, 3 miles (4.8 km) west of Port Mulgrave, and 9.5 miles (15.3 km) north of Whitby. This new venture included building a 3-mile (4.8 km) long tramway connecting the mine to the existing loading facility at Port Mulgrave, as at the time, the nearest railhead was at Redcar some 13 miles (21 km) to the north. The mine had a shaft located at the northern side of the railway sidings, and a drift entrance on the southern side. After the conversion of the mine from steam to electricity, a Sirocco Fan and associated buildings were installed on the site which added improved efficiency in venting gases and introducing air from above ground. The mine worked the main Cleveland Seam of ironstone, although the Port Mulgrave quarrying operations worked the Dogger Seam.

In order to maintain a level operating base for the surface buildings, Easington Beck was diverted through a tunnel and into a culvert. Even so, the new venture was rooted in a narrow valley with many streams and small valleys to cross. Between 1875 and 1899, the mine was owned by Palmers's Shipbuilding & Iron Co., but by July 1899, it was in the ownership of the Grinkle Mining Co. Ltd. This company first floated the idea of a different method of exporting the ore mined, as bad weather at sea affected the shipping of the ore from Port Mulgrave. If the weather was too rough to sail, then this would affect the amount that could be mined as the harbourside at Port Mulgrave had limited storage. However, as the new company was not tied to Palmer's anymore, they could sell their ironstone direct to the furnaces on Teesside. In the 1890s, production was hampered by a downturn in demand for ships, which led to shorter working shifts at the mine. In 1893, the mine was only working for one week in every two. Although the new company did still supply Palmer's with iron ore, they sought out new markets as the output from the mine in 1899 was on average 3,000 short tons (2,700 t) per week, which was being stockpiled as they were unable to sell it all. This led to another reduction of a four-day working week.

Between 1900 and 1914, some ore was transported underground to the Loftus Mine, and then used at Skinningrove Steelworks. This allowed the miners to resume full time working and the contract to supply the Pease and Partners steelworks at Skinningrove, meant that the underground transfer was a simpler method of transporting the ore. However, this practice ceased on the outbreak of the First World War. Additionally, with the possible threat of wartime action at Port Mulgrave, first a rope-worked, then later, an electric incline was installed in 1917, connecting the mine directly with the nearby Whitby to Loftus railway line, which was just to the north. The mine stopped working in 1921, and apart from brief interludes of mining in 1927 and 1929, it had all but stopped supplying Palmers and their blast furnaces at Jarrow ceased production in May 1930, which meant a ceasing of mining at Grinkle. The site was completely abandoned in June 1934, with an official notice stating that the company had been dissolved appearing in the London Gazette in October 1936.

During the course of the mine's operation, 22 workers died, including one who was riding the empty wagons out of the mine when it derailed on the points and threw him out and crushed him.

== Notable staff ==
At the age of 13, future Labour MP, William Mansfield, started work at the mine. He rose to be a check-weighman at the site in 1908.

== Grinkle Mine tramway ==
Grinkle Park Mine Railway
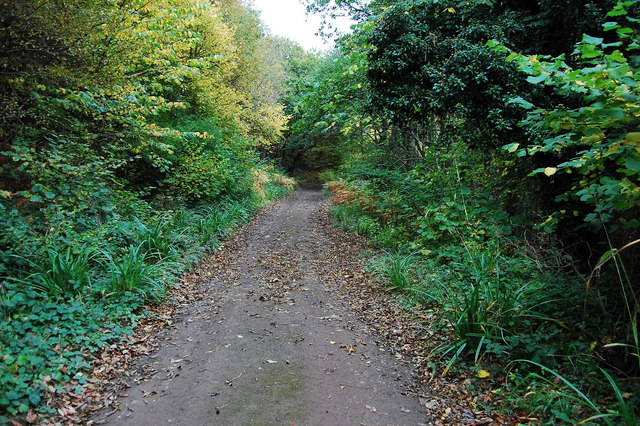
- Grinkle Mine abandoned tramway

Overview
- Status: Closed/lifted
- Termini: Grinkle Mine; Port Mulgrave

Service
- Type: Tramway

History
- Opened: 1875
- Closed: 1930

Technical
- Line length: 2 1/2 miles (4 km)
- Num of tracks: 1
- Track gauge: 3 ft (914 mm)

Grinkle Mine was linked to Port Mulgrave, some 2 1/2 miles (4 km) away, by the company's own tramway, which opened in 1875. The 3-foot (0.91 m) gauge line was also used to transport workers to the minesite from the port due to the remoteness of the mine's location. From the Grinkle Mine site, a single track left southwards through Ridge Lane Tunnel, 376 yards (344 m) long, then curved eastwards through the hamlet of Dalehouse where it entered a longer tunnel (Port Mulgrave Tunnel, 1,729 yards (1,581 m)) which exited onto the cliff-face at Port Mulgrave. (Note: Another source lists the gauge as being 2 feet 6 inches (0.76 m) and the tunnel lengths to be different too. Another source lists the tunnel as being 3 miles (4.8 km) in length. A consultation of modern day Ordnance Survey mapping shows the tunnel to be about 0.93 miles (1.5 km) in length, and is possibly confusing the distance between the two sites, which was 2.5 miles. This tunnel was also known as Dalehouse Tunnel, or Seaton Tunnel.) The railway cost Charles Palmer £40,000 to build in 1875.

The tunnel through to Port Mulgrave was 16 feet (5 m) tall, and was between 23 feet (7 m) and 26 feet (8 m) wide. This had been a previous ironstone working dug into the cliff, which was developed into a brick-lined tunnel for the tramway connecting the dock to Grinkle Mine. The tunnel mouth on the seaward side is still extant and bricked up, some 50 feet (15 m) above the high water mark. Wooden viaducts were built over the becks that the tramway had to cross to get to the port, with timber supplied from Whitehall Shipyard in Whitby.

Trains typically consisted of eight wagons, carrying a loaded weight of 8 short tons (7.3 t) each, (64 short tons (58 t) per train). These were worked by 0-4-0 Saddle Tank engines; two of which were built by Fowler of Leeds and two by Hudswell Clarke.

Port Mulgrave was originally created in 1850s to ship ironstone dug from the surrounding cliffs lining the coast. As this became exhausted, the mining company moved inland to Grinkle Mine and built the tramway so that the port could still be used as a loading point. During its heyday, up to 800 ships a year were loading ironstone for the smelters in the North East of England. Wooden gantries were built some 60 feet (18 m) above the stone jetties that allowed the mined ore to be laden into the ships by means of gravity. Ships would work in a triangular route; firstly carrying coal to London from the Tyne, then running empty to Port Mulgrave, loading with ironstone and then sailing for the Tyne, where they would swap ironstone for coal to begin the journey again. Ships could only enter Port Mulgrave harbour when the tide was rising, and would also need to leave before the water became too low.

Steam engines worked the line between the mine head and the west portal of the tunnel at Port Mulgrave, where a stationary engine rope-hauled the wagons through the tunnel and out onto the jetties. As the western portal of Port Mulgrave Tunnel was the switchover point for the traction, this is where the tramway had a small shed on a siding off the main running line.

The harbour at Port Mulgrave was furnished with three overhead gantries, all with storage below, and an incline leading up from sea level back up to the gantries to allow for an overspill storage if necessary. Besides exporting ironstone, the jetties were also used to import coal for the steam engines and the company also delivered the coal to local communities. Despite being the loading point for the newer mining operation, mining and quarrying of ironstone at Port Mulgrave did not come to an end until 1881, six years after Grinkle had opened. A separate 2-foot (0.61 m) gauge railway ran around the harbour walls to provide materials and labour to maintain the harbour walls.

A new incline was proposed in 1899 to directly connect the Grinkle minesite with the Whitby to Loftus railway line. This would allow the transportation of ironstone from the site direct to the smelters of Middlesbrough via the railway. All work and transfer of materials was ceased by 1916 in Port Mulgrave, partly due to the new incline at the mine site, but also in part of fear that the port could be used as an invasion point, or be attacked by submarines picking off the shipping. A rope-worked incline was built first, sometime during 1916, when the Boulby and Grinkle Park Mines Company reached an agreement with the North Eastern Railway for sidings to load ironstone. These were on the south side of the line, opposite the loading sidings for the Boulby iron ore mine. In 1923, over 25,000 tonnes (28,000 tons) of ore were loaded at the site, which has since been obliterated by the new Boulby Mine complex. After 1916, when ore was transferred direct to the railway line, the tramway ceased to be used to output ironstone, but due to the remote location of the mine, it was still used to transport the miners up and down the valley to the minesite.

The port complex structures were later destroyed by fire in 1934 during a process of removal of the harbour machinery. During the early stages of the Second World War, what remained of the port was demolished by the Royal Engineers. It was thought that the ruined jetties and buildings would be a good landing point for enemy incursions.

== The site ==
When Boulby Mine was opened in 1969, spoil for the workings there were dumped onto the drift part of Grinkle Mine, effectively burying it and damaging much of the structures that were left behind and derelict. In 2015, the culvert built to divert Easington Beck away from the minesite collapsed. ICL UK paid £1.5 million for the remediation of the site.

== Gallery ==
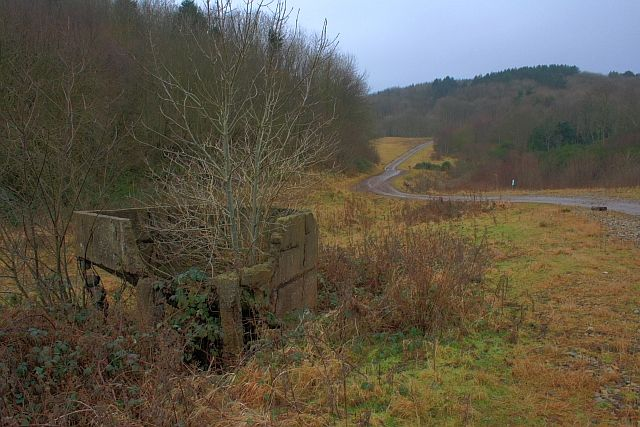
Relic of Grinkle Ironstone Mine

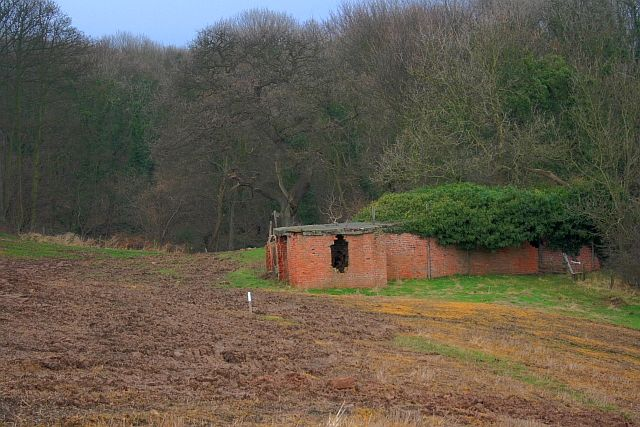
Fan House, Grinkle Ironstone Mine

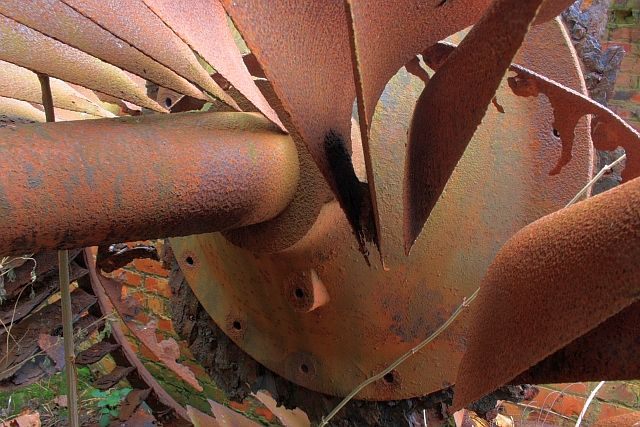
Remains of Sirocco fan

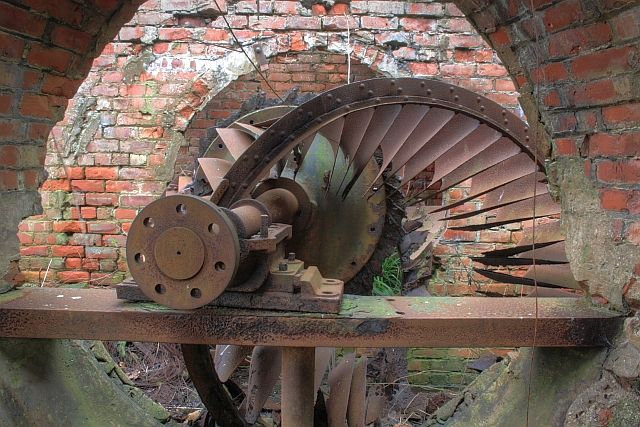
Remains of Sirocco fan

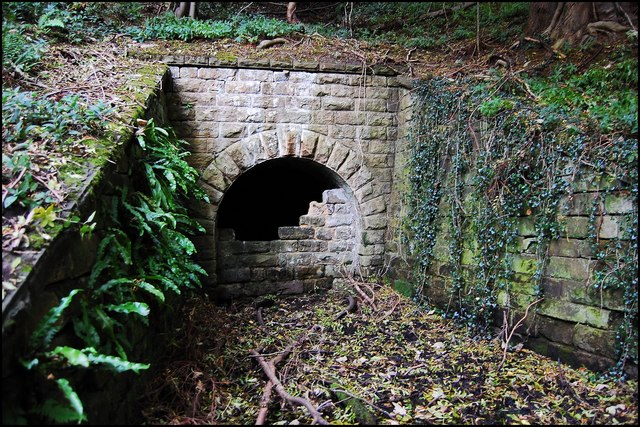
Ridge Lane abandoned tunnel

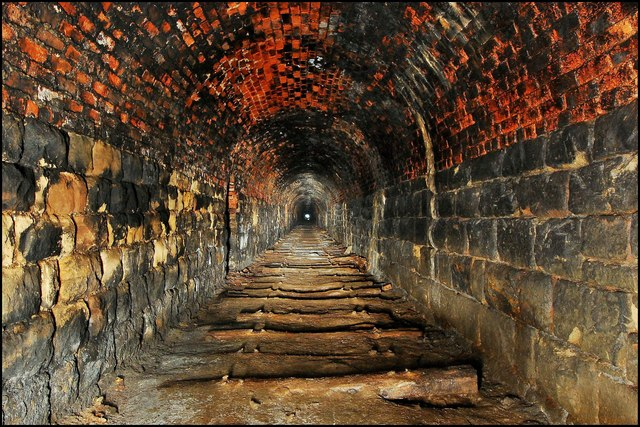
Ridge Lane abandoned tunnel

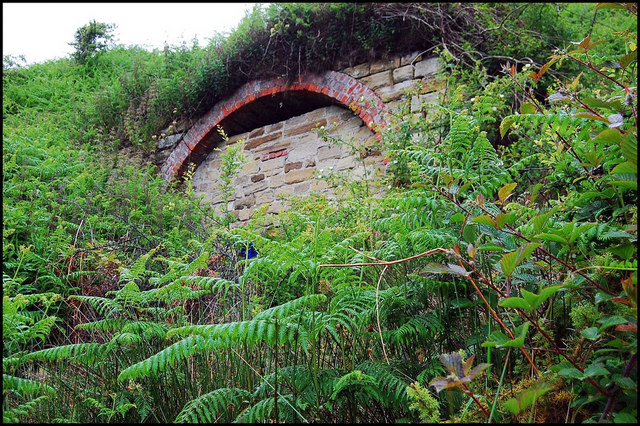
Port Mulgrave mine tunnel portal
