= Silkstone Hall =

Building in Hinderwell, North Yorkshire, England

Coordinates: 54.5345°N 0.7695°W

Silkstone Hall is a historic building in Hinderwell, a village in North Yorkshire, in England.

The house was constructed for the artist Henry Silkstone Hopwood, to a design by Edgar Wood. It was completed in 1902, and was originally named "The Croft". After Hopwood's death in 1914, the building was occupied by the local Inspector of Mines. The building's architect was long forgotten, but was identified by the Edgar Wood Research Project in the 2010s, and as a result the house was grade II listed in 2015. Historic England describe it as an "exemplary example of Arts and Crafts architecture using local materials and vernacular forms".

The house was designed by Edgar Wood in Arts and Crafts style. It is in sandstone with pantile roofs, stone coped gables and kneelers. There are three storeys including attics, and a compact plan, and all the fronts are asymmetric. Most of the windows are mullioned, and here are bay windows. At the entrance to the drive is a gateway, and at the northwest is a pedestrian entrance, both with wrought iron gates in Art Nouveau style. The gate piers have wrought iron finials. Inside, there is an entrance hall leading to a central staircase. The northern first floor bedroom is believed to have originally been an artist's studio, and retains a fireplace which is likely to be original.

== See also ==
- Listed buildings in Hinderwell
