= Listed buildings in Hinderwell =

Hinderwell is a civil parish in the county of North Yorkshire, England. It contains 105 listed buildings that are recorded in the National Heritage List for England. Of these, one is at Grade II*, the middle of the three grades, and the others are at Grade II, the lowest grade. The parish contains the villages of Hinderwell and Staithes, the smaller settlements of Port Mulgrave, Runswick Bay and Dalehouse, and the surrounding countryside. Most of the listed buildings are houses, cottages, shops and associated structures. The others include churches, chapels and associated structures, a holy well, a bridge, public houses, a warehouse, farmhouses and farm buildings, a milepost, and a war memorial clock tower.

== Key ==
Grade	Criteria
II*	Particularly important buildings of more than special interest
II	Buildings of national importance and special interest

== Buildings ==
Name and location	Photograph	Date	Notes	Grade
St Hilda's Well; 54.54256°N 0.77859°W		Medieval (probable)	The holy well is in the churchyard of St Hilda's Church to the north of the church, and it was restored in 1912. The well is in stone, the side walls are rusticated, and it carries a flat slab roof above the spring. On the well is an inscription relating to the restoration.	II
Sea Drift; 54.55846°N 0.78991°W	—	Early 18th century	A house, later incorporating a shop, in rendered stone, with a steep pantile roof and stone coped gables. There is one storey and an attic, and two bays. In the ground floor is a small shop window, and above are half-dormers breaking the eaves.	II
9 and 10 Seaton Garth, Staithes; 54.55835°N 0.78956°W		Early 18th century	Two houses in stone, partly rendered, with a pantile roof and stone copings. There are three storeys and four bays, the top two bays on the right jettied over stout beams. The windows are modern pivoted lights, and the left ground floor window has a lintel and a keystone.	II
Dalehouse Bridge; 54.55172°N 0.80055°W		1745	The bridge a carries a track over Staithes Beck. It is in sandstone, and consists of a single segmental arch with voussoirs and keystones, one dated and initialled, under a hood mould. The bridge has a string course, parapets with chamfered copings carrying inscriptions, and splayed abutments. To the north is a semicircular arch over a former mill race.	II
1 High Street, Hinderwell; 54.54181°N 0.77830°W	—	Mid 18th century	The former rectory, incorporating part of an earlier rectory, it is in stone, with a floor band, a corbelled parapet, and a pantile roof with stone coping. There are wo storeys and an attic, three bays, and flanking single-storey extensions. In the centre is a doorway with fluted pilasters, a patterned fanlight and a pediment, and the windows are sashes. In the attic are two gabled dormers.	II
25 and 27 Porret Lane, Hinderwell; 54.54083°N 0.77874°W	—	18th century	Two houses in stone with pantile roofs, stone copings and small kneelers. There are two storeys and three bays. The windows are sashes. No. 25 has a canted bay window and a passage on the left, and No. 27 has a gabled porch.	II
Brown's Haven; 54.55852°N 0.79014°W		18th century	The house is in stone, rendered at the front, with a chamfered stone quoin on the left, a moulded eaves cornice, and a pantile roof. There are three storeys, and a front of two bays. The windows are sashes, and in the left return is a small doorway with an architrave.	II
Greystones; 54.55879°N 0.79254°W	—	18th century	At one time a public house, the house is in stone with a Welsh slate roof. There are three storeys and three bays. The central doorway has a Doric doorcase, a radial fanlight and a tall open pediment. The windows are casements in architraves.	II
Harbour View; 54.55834°N 0.78944°W	—	18th century	The house is rendered and has a pantile roof. There is one storey and attics, and two bays. The central doorway is flanked by sash windows in architraves, and in the attic are two round-headed dormers.	II
Lynn Cottage, Boulby Cottage and Hilda Cottage; 54.55809°N 0.79340°W	—	18th century	A row of three cottages in stone, with a pantile roof and stone coped gables. There are two storeys and attics, and each cottage has two bays. Some windows are sashes, there is a two-storey canted bay window, and modern windows. The doorways have oblong fanlights, and Lynn Cottage has a gabled dormer with a bargeboard.	II
Royal George Warehouse; 54.55935°N 0.79189°W	—	18th century	The warehouse is in stone and has a stone-coped pantile roof. There is one tall storey, and it contains a tall side door, a blocked door and a window, all with stone lintels.	II
Sea Crest; 54.55881°N 0.79071°W	—	18th century	The house is rendered, on a plinth, and it has a pantile roof with stone-coped gables, the gable end facing the street. There are two storeys and two bays, and an outshut containing a doorway. The house contains a double-hung sash window and a fixed light.	II
Slip Top; 54.55883°N 0.79064°W	—	18th century	The house is rendered with a pantile roof. There are two storeys and an attic, and two bays, and the gable end faces the sea. The windows vary, and include a sash window and a fixed light.	II
Spindrift; 54.55858°N 0.79003°W	—	18th century	The house is rendered, and has a tile roof with stone copings. There are two storeys and one wide bay, and a small outshut. The windows include sashes, one horizontally-sliding.	II
St Heliers; 54.55796°N 0.79021°W	—	18th century	The house is in rendered stone on a bedrock plinth, and it has a Welsh slate roof. There are two storeys and two bays. The windows are sashes with plain surrounds and stone lintels. The roadside front is blank apart for one sash window.	II
Walls, St Hilda's Rectory; 54.54257°N 0.77808°W	—	18th century	The walls enclosing the garden on the east and south sides are in stone. The south part is later and has rounded coping. The earlier parts are taller and have flat coping.	II
The Cottage; 54.55837°N 0.79058°W	—	18th century	The cottage is in rendered stone with a pantile roof. There is one storey and an attic, and one bay. In the ground floor is a doorway, and the windows are sashes, those in the upper floor breaking the eaves.	II
The Cottage and Viking Cottage; 54.55830°N 0.78970°W	—	18th century	A pair of rendered houses with a pantile roof and stone copings. There are two storeys and an attic, each house has one bay, and there is an extension on the front. Some windows are modern, and others date from the 19th century.	II
Thornhill; 54.53874°N 0.77387°W	—	18th century	The house is in stone, with a floor band, and a swept pantile roof with stone copings. There are two storeys and four bays. The doorway and the windows, which are sashes, have surrounds of alternating blocks, and keystones.	II
West View and adjacent cottage 54.55804°N 0.79352°W	—	18th century	A pair of stone cottages with pantile roofs and stone copings. There are two storeys and attics, and three bays. A garage door has been inserted, the windows are sashes, and there are two modern dormers.	II
St Hilda's Church; 54.54236°N 0.77852°W		1773	The tower was added in 1817, and the church was restored in 1895. It is in stone with a Welsh slate roof, and consists of a nave, a chancel and a west tower. The tower has two stages, a west doorway, and an embattled parapet. The windows are square-headed with Perpendicular tracery, and at the east end is a Venetian window.	II
Aunt Pat's Cottage; 54.55822°N 0.79011°W	—	Late 18th century	A small house in rendered stone with a pantile roof. There are two storeys and one wide bay. The doorway has a plain architrave, and the windows are sashes with chamfered surrounds. In the right return is a fixed light.	II
Bramble Cottage and Ye Cot; 54.55843°N 0.79056°W	—	Late 18th century	A pair of stone cottages, rendered on the front, with a pantile roof and stone kneelers. There are two storeys and three bays. The windows are sashes with stone lintels, and in the centre of the upper floor is a blank panel.	II
Cliff Crest; 54.55934°N 0.79232°W		Late 18th century	The house is rendered, and has a pantile roof with stone coping. There are two storeys and fronts of two bays. The doorway and windows are modern.	II
Corner House; 54.55862°N 0.79064°W	—	Late 18th century	The house is rendered, and has a Welsh slate roof with stone copings and small kneelers. There are three storeys, one bay, and a projecting outshut on the left. The doorway has an oblong fanlight, and the windows are sashes.	II
Barn and wall, Greylands Farm; 54.54153°N 0.77767°W		Late 18th century	The barn is in stone, and has a pantile roof with stone copings and kneelers. There are two storeys, and its openings, including slit vents, have chamfered surrounds. To the north is a single-bay extension with a tile roof. The forecourt wall is tall, curving and has gabled coping.	II
Cottage, Royal George Yard; 54.55927°N 0.79165°W	—	Late 18th century	The cottage is rendered and has a pantile roof. The left bay is gabled with two storeys, and behind on the right is a single storey. This part contains a sash window, and the other windows are original with fixed lights.	II
Seaholm and Cherryburn; 54.55845°N 0.79011°W	—	Late 18th century	A pair of stone houses with a pantile roof. There are two storeys, an attic and a basement, and two bays. On the front are two doorways, the left with an oblong fanlight, modern casement windows, and in the left house is a modern dormer.	II
The Fox and Hounds Public House; 54.55154°N 0.79984°W		Late 18th century	A house and a cottage to the left combined into a public house, it is in stone, and has a pantile roof with stone coping and square kneelers. There are two storeys and four bays, the left two bays lower. On the front is a doorway, the windows are sashes. and there is a modern skylight.	II
The Smugglers; 54.55926°N 0.79216°W		Late 18th century	A house with later inserted shops, it is in yellow brick, with stone dressings, rusticated quoins, and a pantile roof with roof lights. There are two storeys and four bays. In the ground floor is a modern shopfront, and above are sash windows with lintels carved as voussoirs, and keystones.	II
The Thatched Cottage; 54.53409°N 0.74872°W		Late 18th century	The house is in stone and has a thatched roof. There are two storeys and two bays. The doorway is in the centre and the windows are sashes, those in the upper floor bowed.	II
18 Church Street, Staithes; 54.55838°N 0.79034°W	—	Late 18th or early 19th century	The house is in rendered stone on a plinth, and has a pantile roof with stone copings and kneelers. There are two storeys and two bays. The doorway has an oblong fanlight, and the windows are casements.	II
99 and 101 High Street, Hinderwell; 54.53847°N 0.77363°W	—	Late 18th or early 19th century	A pair of stone cottages with a pantile roof. There are two storeys and two bays. On the left is a passage entry, on the right is a doorway with an oblong fanlight, and between them are two small bay windows. The upper floor contains sash windows.	II
60 High Street, Staithes; 54.55908°N 0.79205°W	—	Late 18th or early 19th century	A house, at one time containing a shop, in rendered brick with a pantile roof. There are three storeys and two bays, the lower two storeys of the left bay projecting. The doorway has a plain surround, and most of the windows are sashes under segmental brick arches.	II
67 High Street, Staithes; 54.55915°N 0.79172°W	—	Late 18th or early 19th century	A small house in rendered brick with a pantile roof. There are two storeys and two bays. On the left is a passage entrance, to its right is a doorway, and further to the right and in the upper floor are sash windows.	II
Ashe Cottage; 54.55897°N 0.79122°W	—	Late 18th or early 19th century	The house is rendered and has a Welsh slate roof. There are two storeys and three bays. In the left bay is a doorway with a patterned oblong fanlight, and the windows are sashes. All the openings have keystones.	II
Barris House, Pilgrim Cottage and Eight Bells; 54.55852°N 0.79105°W	—	Late 18th or early 19th century	A row of three stone cottages with pantile roofs. There are two storeys, and each cottage has one wide bay. Each cottage has a doorway, and the windows are horizontally-sliding sashes, single in the upper floor, and double hung in pairs on the ground floor.	II
Chapel Garth; 54.53415°N 0.74887°W	—	Late 18th or early 19th century	The house is in stone, with a pantile roof and stone coping on the left. There is a single storey and an attic, two wide bays, and an extension to the right with a hipped roof. Most of the windows are casements, and there are also bow windows.	II
East View; 54.55880°N 0.79098°W	—	Late 18th or early 19th century	The house is rendered and has a pantile roof. There are two storeys and three bays. To the left is a garage door, and to the right is a doorway with an oblong fanlight. The middle bay contains a two-storey canted bay window, and the other windows are sashes.	II
Glaisdale Cottage; 54.55866°N 0.79269°W	—	Late 18th or early 19th century	The cottage is in rendered stone with a tile roof. There are three storeys and one bay. On the gabled front is a doorway to the left, and sash windows.	II
Haseldene; 54.55851°N 0.79029°W	—	Late 18th or early 19th century	A house divided into two, it is rendered, and has a pantile roof with stone copings and kneelers. There are two storeys and three bays. On the front is a doorway, to its right is a shop window with four arched lights, and the other windows are sashes.	II
Barn and byre north of High Farmhouse; 54.53772°N 0.77265°W	—	Late 18th or early 19th century	The farm buildings are in stone with stone-coped pantile roofs. The barn at the north has two storeys and a one-storey extension, and there is a single-storey range to the north. The openings include boarded doors and small openings with fixed lights.	II
Kippers Corner; 54.55909°N 0.79229°W	—	Late 18th or early 19th century	A house in rendered stone on a corner site, with a pantile roof, stone copings and kneelers. There are three storeys and two bays. Two steps lead up to a doorway in the right bay with a blocked oblong fanlight. To its left is a three-light transomed window, and in the upper floors are sash windows.	II
Kirkhill; 54.55835°N 0.79011°W	—	Late 18th or early 19th century	The house is in stone, and has a stone-coped pantile roof. There are two storeys and five bays. Five steps lead up to a doorway that has a Doric doorcase with fluted and reeded pilasters, and a pediment. The windows are sashes. to the left is an inserted doorway, and at the rear is a round-headed stair window. The area wall is in stone with moulded coping.	II*
Smugglers Cottage and warehouse 54.55936°N 0.79209°W	—	Late 18th or early 19th century	The house and warehouse are in stone, the warehouse is rendered, and they have pantile roofs. The house has two storeys and three bays, and the warehouse has a single storey and two bays. The house has modern doors and windows, the warehouse has 19th-century doors, and in the basement is a segmental relieving arch.	II
The Anchorage; 54.55923°N 0.79204°W	—	Late 18th or early 19th century	The house, with a cottage at the rear, has a rendered front, rusticated quoins, and a pantile roof. The house has three storeys and two bays. In the left bay is a two-storey canted bay window. To the right is a doorway with an oblong fanlight, above which is a window, both with a segmental stone lintel and a keystone. The cottage has two storeys and one bay, and it contains sash windows.	II
The Royal George Public House; 54.55920°N 0.79189°W		Late 18th or early 19th century	The public house is rendered, on a plinth, and has a pantile roof. There are three storeys and three bays. In the left bay is a two-storey canted bay window. To the right is a public house front with quasi-Doric pilasters and a fascia, containing a doorway with an oblong fanlight. Elsewhere, there are sash windows.	II
Thornton House; 54.55862°N 0.79274°W	—	Late 18th or early 19th century	A house and shop in stone with a tile roof. There are two storeys and an attic, and two bays. In the ground floor is a shopfront with quasi-Doric pilasters and two doorways, and above are modern windows and 20th-century dormers.	II
Top of Steps; 54.55858°N 0.79073°W	—	Late 18th or early 19th century	The house is rendered and has a pantile roof. There are two storeys and two bays. On the front are a modern doorway and sash windows.	II
Venus Cottage; 54.55913°N 0.79165°W	—	Late 18th or early 19th century	The house is in stone with a pantile roof. There are three storeys and a basement, and two bays. On the front is a doorway with an oblong fanlight, to the right is a passage entry, and the windows are segmental-headed sashes.	II
Building south of Watch House; 54.55909°N 0.79144°W	—	Late 18th or early 19th century	The building is in stone, partly rendered, and has a pantile roof with stone copings. There are two low storeys and one bay. It contains a doorway and fixed lights, and in the west front is a blocked long window.	II
Waverley; 54.55910°N 0.79159°W	—	Late 18th or early 19th century	The house is in stone, and has a pantile roof with stone kneelers. There are three stories and a basement, and two bays. Three steps lead up to the central doorway, and the windows are sashes.	II
1, 2 and 3 Chapel Yard, Staithes; 54.55889°N 0.79303°W	—	Early 19th century	A row of three stone cottages with a pantile roof. There are two storeys, and each cottage has one bay. On the front are three doorways, and three two-light casement windows with transoms.	II
2 Boathouse Yard, Staithes; 54.55932°N 0.79163°W	—	Early 19th century	The house is rendered and has a pantile roof. There are two storeys and an attic, and two bays. On the front is a doorway, the windows are sashes, and in the attic are two gabled dormers with carved bargeboards.	II
3 and 4 Boathouse Yard, Staithes; 54.55927°N 0.79165°W	—	Early 19th century	A house, later divided into two, with possibly an earlier core, it is rendered and has a pantile roof. There are two storeys and three bays. On the front are two doorways, and the windows are sashes.	II
1 Elliots Yard, Staithes; 54.55842°N 0.79313°W	—	Early 19th century	A back-to-back house in rendered stone with a Welsh slate roof. There are three storeys, and a projecting gabled section on the left. On the front is a doorway, and the windows are irregularly-placed sashes, one horizontally-sliding.	II
74 High Street, Staithes; 54.55897°N 0.79154°W	—	Early 19th century	A house and shop on a corner site in stone, with chamfered quoins and a pantile roof. There are three storeys, and a front with one wide bay. In the ground floor is a curved shopfront with a tiled stall riser, and above is a two-storey canted oriel window.	II
79 High Street, Staithes; 54.55904°N 0.79139°W	—	Early 19th century	A house and shop in stone, with a Welsh slate roof, stone copings and kneelers. There are three storeys and two bays. In the ground floor is an altered shopfront, and above are sash windows.	II
91 High Street, Staithes; 54.55888°N 0.79083°W	—	Early 19th century	A house on a corner site, it is rendered and has an asbestos tile roof. There are three storeys, and one bay on each front. On the front is a doorway, and the windows are sashes.	II
1 and 2 Wesley Square, Staithes; 54.55887°N 0.79333°W	—	Early 19th century	A pair of shops with town houses above, the front is in stone, and elsewhere the buildings is in yellow brick on a plinth, with stone quoins. The roof is in Welsh slate with stone copings and kneelers. On the front facing the river are four storeys, at the rear are three storeys, and the fronts have two bays. The doors have four panels, most of the windows are sashes, one is tripartite, and the lintels are in stone.	II
Atcot and cottage to the right 54.55859°N 0.79326°W	—	Early 19th century	A pair of stone cottages with a pantile roof, and stone coping and a shaped kneeler on the left. There are two storeys, and each cottage has one bay. On the front are two doorways, Atcot has sash windows, the other cottage has casements, and all the openings have reeded stone lintels.	II
Balmoral House; 54.55830°N 0.79036°W	—	Early 19th century	The house is in stone, and has a tile roof with stone copings. There are two storeys and a basement, three bays, and an added three-storey-square bay window on the right. Four steps lead up to a doorway with a reeded architrave and a pediment. The windows are sashes in architraves, and in the basement is a horizontally-sliding sash window. At the rear is a round-arched stair window.	II
Barbers Cottage; 54.55939°N 0.79197°W	—	Early 19th century	A house in red brick with rusticated stone quoins and a pantile roof. The front is gabled, and has two storeys, an attic and a basement, and two bays. Four steps lead up to the doorway, and the windows are sashes, the one in the attic horizontally-sliding with a loading pulley above.	II
Bay View and Ship Cottage; 54.53396°N 0.74987°W	—	Early 19th century	A pair of stone cottages with pantile roofs and stone coping on the right. There are two storeys and each cottage has one wide bay and a doorway. In the ground floor of Bay View is a casement window, Ship Cottage has a rounded bow window, and in the upper floor are horizontally-sliding sash windows.	II
Beaumont House; 54.55845°N 0.79307°W		Early 19th century	The house is in stone with a tile roof, two storeys and a basement, and three bays. Steps lead up to a doorway in the left bay, and on the right is a passage entrance. The windows are sashes, and in the basement are rectangular fanlights.	II
Broom Hill View; 54.55914°N 0.79165°W	—	Early 19th century	The house is rendered. There are three storeys and a basement, and one wide bay. Three steps lead to a doorway with an oblong fanlight and a pedimented hood on brackets, and there is a small basement door. In each floor is a cross casement window.	II
Claymoor Cottage; 54.53395°N 0.74925°W	—	Early 19th century	A small stone house with a pantile roof, coped on the right. There is one storey and an attic, and two bays. The windows are sashes in architraves, and the ground floor windows and doorway have heavy lintels.	II
Coastguard Cottages; 54.55876°N 0.79285°W		Early 19th century	A house divided into two, in stone, with a wooden eaves cornice on paired brackets, and a Welsh slate roof with stone copings and kneelers. There are three storeys and a basement, and two bays. Four steps with iron handrails lead up to paired central doorways under one lintel. The basement window is modern, and the other windows are sashes.	II
Friendship Cottage; 54.55854°N 0.79055°W	—	Early 19th century	The house is in rendered stone on a plinth, and has a pantile roof with stone gable coping. There is one storey and an attic, two bays, and an extension to the south. The doorway is in the south return, and the windows are sashes, one is horizontally-sliding, and the upper windows are in half-dormers.	II
Grimes Cottage; 54.55862°N 0.79138°W	—	Early 19th century	The cottage us in stone with a pantile roof. There are two storeys and three bays. In the centre is a doorway, the windows are sashes, and there are two later dormers.	II
Grosvenor House; 54.55907°N 0.79146°W	—	Early 19th century	A house, at one time a shop, in stone, with a Welsh slate roof, stone kneelers and copings. There are three storeys and one wide bay. In the ground floor is a doorway on the left with a divided fanlight, to its right is a shop window and a passage entry. The middle floor contains a sash window flanked by circular windows, and in the top floor is a cross casement window.	II
High Farmhouse; 54.53754°N 0.77288°W	—	Early 19th century	The farmhouse and attached cottage are in stone, and have a tile roof with gable copings. There are two storeys and four bays, the left part lower. The doorway have oblong fanlights, and the windows are sashes.	II
Forecourt west of High Farmhouse; 54.53758°N 0.77323°W	—	Early 19th century (probable)	The forecourt wall is in stone with flat coping. It is high near the house, and ramped down along the garden. The wall incorporates a small outbuilding on its canted corner.	II
Hillside Cottage; 54.55803°N 0.79054°W	—	Early 19th century	The cottage has incised rendered walls, and a pantile roof with stone copings. There are three storeys, two bays, and an extension to the left. The doorway is in the centre, and there are two sash windows in the lower two floors, and one in the top floor.	II
Holme Farmhouse and wall 54.53963°N 0.77581°W	—	Early 19th century	The farmhouse is in stone, and has a Welsh slate roof with stone copings. There are two storeys and three bays. The central doorway has an oblong fanlight, and the windows are sashes with plain surrounds. The forecourt is enclosed by a low wall with rounded coping.	II
Megs Cottage; 54.55932°N 0.79199°W	—	Early 19th century	The cottage is in rendered stone with a curved wall, and has a pantile roof. There are two storeys and two bays. The doorway has a plain surround, and the windows are sashes.	II
North Lea and wall 54.53398°N 0.74951°W		Early 19th century	The house is in stone, and has a pantile roof with stone copings and kneelers. There are two storeys and a raised central attic, and two bays. The doorway is in the centre, the windows are sashes in architraves, and the sunk areas around the house are enclosed by a curved wall.	II
Pinjarra; 54.55779°N 0.78987°W	—	Early 19th century	The house is rendered and has a pantile roof. There are two storeys and three bays, the right bay recessed. On the front are two doorways, a three-light transomed casement window, and sash windows in architraves.	II
Poplar House; 54.55847°N 0.79277°W	—	Early 19th century	A house and a cottage, later combined, with rendered walls, pantile roofs, two storeys and an L-shaped plan. The cottage on the north has one bay, and a part extension with a canted bay. It contains a doorway with an oblong fanlight and sash windows. The house has two bays, a porch, and casement windows.	II
Rock Lea; 54.55880°N 0.79282°W	—	Early 19th century	The house is in stone and has a pantile roof with stone copings and kneelers. There are four storeys and two bays. In the left bay is a doorway, and the windows are sashes.	II
Ruby House; 54.55906°N 0.79287°W	—	Early 19th century	The house is in stone, and has a Welsh slate roof with stone copings and kneelers. There are three storeys and two bays. A double perron of five steps leads up to a doorway with a patterned rectangular fanlight, and the windows are sashes.	II
Seven Bells; 54.55870°N 0.79304°W	—	Early 19th century	The house is rendered on the front, and has a Welsh slate roof with stone copings and short kneelers. There are two storeys, two bays, and a single-storey extension on the left. On the front is a doorway and sash windows, those on the ground floor with segmental arches.	II
Spout House; 54.53403°N 0.74991°W	—	Early 19th century	A small cottage in stone with a pantile roof. There is a single storey, two bays, and a small outhouse extension to the right. In the centre is a Dutch door, and the windows are sashes.	II
Sunny Lea; 54.55851°N 0.79306°W	—	Early 19th century	The house is in rendered stone, and has a tile roof with a stone ridge and copings. There are three storeys and two bays. In the ground floor is a modern doorway and window, and the upper floors contain sash windows in splayed openings.	II
The Black Lion Public House; 54.55891°N 0.79243°W	—	Early 19th century	The public house is in painted stone with a Welsh slate roof. There are three storeys and four bays. The doorway has an oblong fanlight, and most of the windows are sashes with projecting stone sills and stone lintels.	II
The Old Mill; 54.55176°N 0.79962°W	—	Early 19th century	A house and a cottage, later combined, in stone, with a pantile roof, stone copings and kneelers. There are two storeys and five bays, The doorway has a small oblong fanlight, and the windows are sashes with plain surrounds.	II
The Old Watch House; 54.55919°N 0.79145°W	—	Early 19th century	A rendered cottage with a hipped pantile roof. There are two storeys and two bays. In the ground floor are two windows and a doorway, and the upper floor contains sash windows.	II
Watch House; 54.55928°N 0.79150°W	—	Early 19th century	A rendered cottage with a pantile roof. There are two storeys, one bay on the front and two on the gable end. The doorway is modern, and the windows are sashes with stone lintels, those in the ground floor in splayed reveals.	II
Westgate; 54.55843°N 0.79312°W	—	Early 19th century	The house is in stone on a plinth, and has a Welsh slate roof with stone copings and kneelers. There are three storeys and a basement, and three bays. Steps with an iron handrail lead up to a central doorway with a fanlight, above which is a blocked window. The other windows are sashes with stone lintels.	II
Former Bethel Congregational Church; 54.55829°N 0.79356°W		1835	The former church is in sandstone on a plinth, with a hipped Welsh slate roof. There are two storeys at the front and four at the rear, and three bays. In the centre is a round-arched doorway with a fanlight and a hood mould, and to the left is a flat-headed doorway with an oblong fanlight. The windows are round-arched with impost blocks. Above the central doorway is a plaque inscribed "BETHEL" in Egyptian relief carving. At the rear is a small outhouse and cast iron area railings.	II
110 High Street, Hinderwell; 54.53815°N 0.77397°W		Early to mid 19th century	The house is in stone, and has a Welsh slate roof with stone copings and curved kneelers. There are three storeys and three bays. In the centre is a doorway with an oblong fanlight, and above are sash windows. The outer bays contain full-height canted bay windows with moulded eaves and hipped roofs.	II
Greylands Farmhouse; 54.54136°N 0.77751°W	—	Early to mid 19th century	The farmhouse is in stone, and has a Welsh slate roof with stone copings. There are two storeys and four bays. The doorway has a chamfered surround and an oblong fanlight, and the windows are sashes in architraves.	II
Linden Cottage; 54.55862°N 0.79339°W	—	Early to mid 19th century	The house is in stone, and has a pantile roof with stone coping and kneelers. There are two storeys and two bays. The doorway has an oblong fanlight, and the windows are sashes, one with a large keystone.	II
Sandringham and the Coffins; 54.55878°N 0.79255°W	—	Early to mid 19th century	A house divided into two, it is in red brick with pale brick headers and a Welsh slate roof. There are three storeys and three bays. In the centre are paired doorways with oblong fanlights. To the left is a canted bay window, to the right is a square bay window, and the upper floors contain sash windows.	II
The Badger Hounds Public House; 54.54026°N 0.77614°W		Early to mid 19th century	The public house is in rendered stone on a stone plinth, and has a pantile roof with stone coping and kneelers. There are two storeys, four bays, and a single-storey extension on the left. In the centre is a porch with a slate hipped roof, and the windows are sashes.	II
Forecourt walls, railings and gate, Balmoral House; 54.55830°N 0.79027°W	—	19th century	The wall to the east of the house is in stone. The railings are in wrought iron with cast iron standards, and the gate is in wrought iron.	II
Milepost; 54.54132°N 0.77776°W		19th century	The milepost to the northeast of the A174 road is in cast iron, and has a triangular plan, a chamfered top and a semicircular backplate. On the backplate is inscribed "NORTH RIDING OF YORKSHIRE", on the top is "HINDERWELL U. D. C.". On the sides are pointing arrows, the left side with the distances to Whitby and Scarborough, and on the right side to Saltburn and Guisborough.	II
St Peter's Church and clergy house 54.55817°N 0.79030°W		Mid 19th century	Originally a school, later a church, and subsequently used for other purposes, the building is in stone on a plinth, and has a pantile roof with stone copings. There is one tall storey and an undercroft. Most of the windows are sashes, and there is a blocked round-arched window. On the porch is a bellcote, and the porch links to the clergy house.	II
The Old Chapel; 54.55837°N 0.79288°W		Mid 19th century	Originally a Sunday school, the chapel is in stone on a plinth, and has a Welsh slate roof with stone copings. There are two storeys and three bays. On the front is a projecting gabled porch, the windows are sashes, and the front area is enclosed by cast iron railings.	II
York House; 54.55866°N 0.79153°W	—	Mid 19th century	The house is in stone with a stone-coped Welsh slate roof. There are two storeys and a basement plinth, and three bays. The central doorway has an oblong fanlight flanked by casement windows, and above it is a blank panel. The other windows are sashes, and in the basement is a modern doorway.	II
Methodist Chapel, Sunday School and walls 54.53867°N 0.77456°W		1873	The Sunday school was added to the north in 1886. The buildings are in stone with Welsh slate roofs, stone copings, kneelers and finials. They form two parallel ranges, the chapel taller. Each has quoins, an eaves band, and a central round-arched doorway in a gabled projection flanked by round-arched windows. Above the chapel doorway is an inscribed plaque and a small round-headed window, and above the school doorway is a circular window. In front is a low forecourt wall with four-gabled gate piers and alternating raised rounded coping stones.	II
Primitive Methodist Chapel; 54.55830°N 0.79300°W		1880	The chapel, later used for other purposes, is in stone on a plinth, with rusticated quoins, an ornamented string course and a Welsh slate roof. There are two storeys and five bays, the middle three bays projecting under a pediment containing an oculus with keystones. In the outer bays are round-arched doorways with architraves, pilasters with leafy capitals, and keystones. Between these are two windows with segmental heads, and the upper floor contains round-arched windows with architraves and keystones. In front are cast iron area railings with fleur-de-lys standards.	II
Silkstone Hall and gateways 54.53452°N 0.76950°W	—	1902	The house was designed by Edgar Wood in Arts and Crafts style. It is in sandstone with pantile roofs, stone coped gables and kneelers. There are three storeys including attics, and a compact plan, and all the fronts are asymmetric. Most of the windows are mullioned, and here are bay windows. At the entrance to the drive is a gateway, and at the northwest is a pedestrian entrance, both with wrought iron gates in Art Nouveau style. The gate piers have wrought iron finials.	II
War Memorial Clock Tower; 54.53785°N 0.77330°W		1921	The war memorial is in a paved enclosure by a road junction, and is in Aislaby stone. It consists of a clock tower on a rusticated plinth with a splayed base on two steps. The tower is rusticated with corner block columns and a string course arching over the clock face. Above this is a dentilled cornice, and a segmental pediment on a stepped base. A stone table on the north side contains the names of those lost in the First World Warr, and there is a stone tablet with the names of those lost in the Second World War. On the splayed foot is an inscription.	II
