= St Peter's Church, Staithes =

Church in Staithes, North Yorkshire, England

Coordinates: 54°33′29″N 0°47′25″W

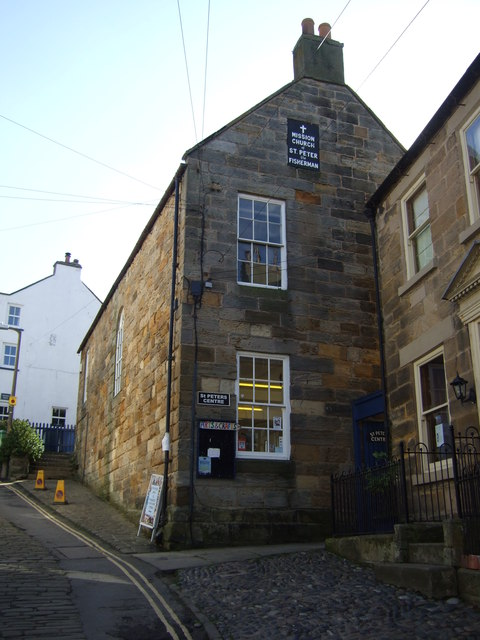
The church, in 2014

St Peter's Church is an Anglican church in Staithes, a village in North Yorkshire, in England.

A private house was constructed in 1802 for William Weatherill. He died in 1847, and the house was converted into a school. There was no Anglican church in the village, so in 1849, the school was licensed for worship. In 1874 it became a mission church, dedicated to Saint Peter the fisherman. An attached house was made available for clergy, but it remained served by the vicar of St Hilda's Church, Hinderwell. From the 1940s, the lower room was used to host community events, and the building is now leased to a community group as St Peter's Centre. Monthly church services continue to take place in the upper room. The building was grade II listed in 1973.

The building is built of stone on a plinth, and has a pantile roof with stone copings. There is one tall storey and an undercroft. Most of the windows are sashes, and there is a blocked round-arched window. On the porch is a bellcote, and the porch links to the clergy house.

== See also ==
- Listed buildings in Hinderwell
