= Primitive Methodist Chapel =

Primitive Methodist Chapel may refer to:

- Primitive Methodist Chapel, Nantwich, in England
- Primitive Methodist Chapel, Staithes, in England

== See also ==
- Primitive Methodist Church
