= The Royal George =

Pub in Hinderwell, North Yorkshire, England

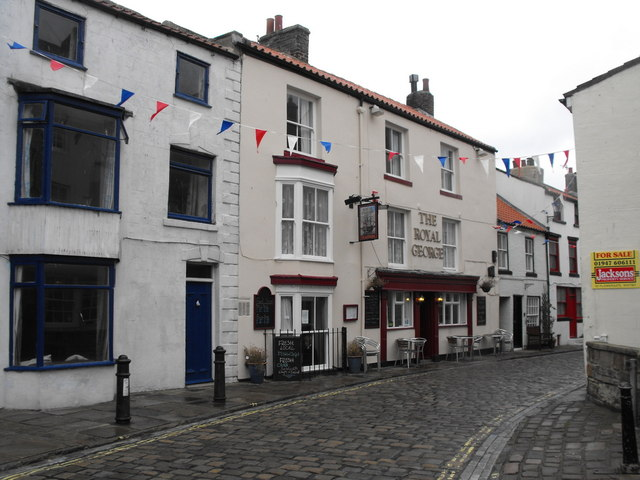
The pub, in 2013

The Royal George is a historic pub in Staithes, a village in North Yorkshire, in England.

The building was constructed in about 1800, as an inn. It was grade II listed in 1973. In 2021, Tom Parker Bowles and Olly Smith listed it as one of Yorkshire's cosiest pubs, noting its coal fire, real ales, and food including fish and chips and crab sandwiches.

The public house is rendered, on a plinth, and has a pantile roof. There are three storeys and three bays. In the left bay is a two-storey canted bay window. To the right is a public house front with quasi-Doric pilasters and a fascia, containing a doorway with an oblong fanlight. Elsewhere, there are sash windows.

== See also ==
- Listed buildings in Hinderwell
