= Our Lady Star of the Sea Church, Staithes =

Catholic church in North Yorkshire, England

Coordinates: 54°33′15″N 0°47′41″W

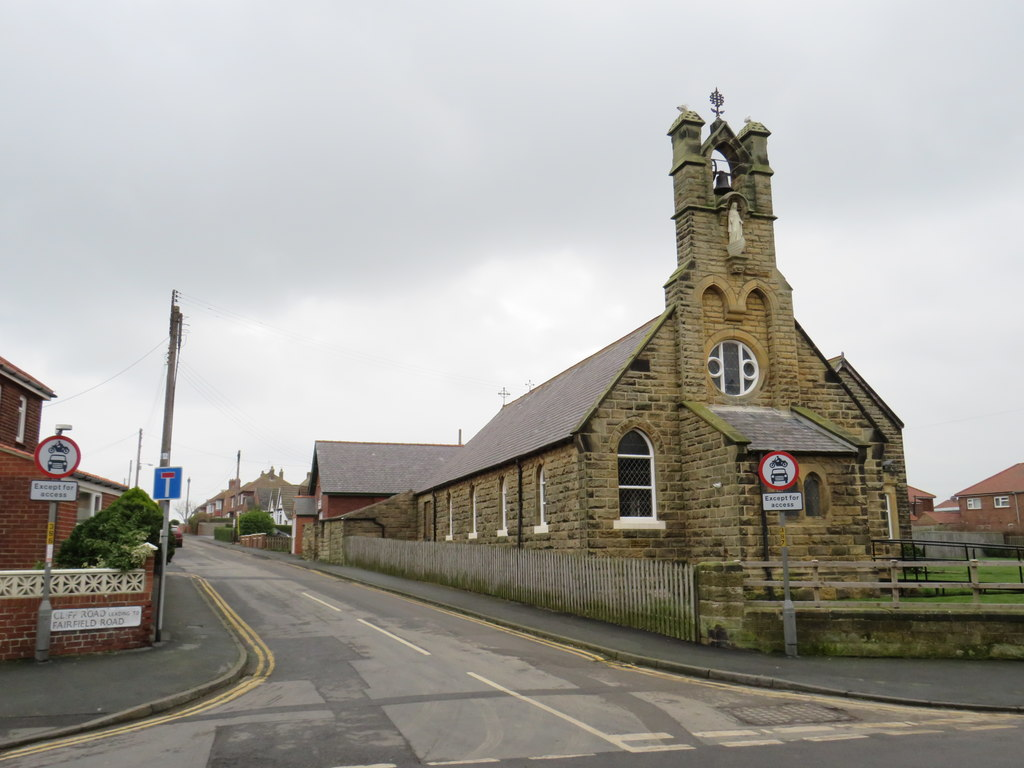
The church, in 2019

Our Lady Star of the Sea is a Catholic church in Staithes, a village in North Yorkshire, in England.

Until the late 19th century, Catholics in Staithes worshipped at Ugthorpe or at Loftus. A church was constructed between 1884 and 1885, to a design by Martin Carr, in the Gothic Revival style. It cost about £1,250, and the first resident priest was installed in 1895.

The church is built of sandstone and has a Welsh slate roof. It is a single space with a combined nave and chancel, measuring 70 feet (21 m) by 25 feet (7.6 m). There is a porch at the west end, below a statue of the Virgin and Child on the prow of a boat, carved by A. B. Wall. Above them is a circular window, and a gable end topped by a large bellcote. Nikolaus Pevsner was unimpressed by the bellcote and described it as "fussy". The windows are lancets, quite poorly carved. There is a presbytery attached to the southeast corner of the church, which may be contemporary or slightly later. Inside are a Gothic altar and pulpit, original pews, and one stained glass window installed in about 1973.
