= Fox and Hounds, Dalehouse =

Pub in Hinderwell, North Yorkshire, England

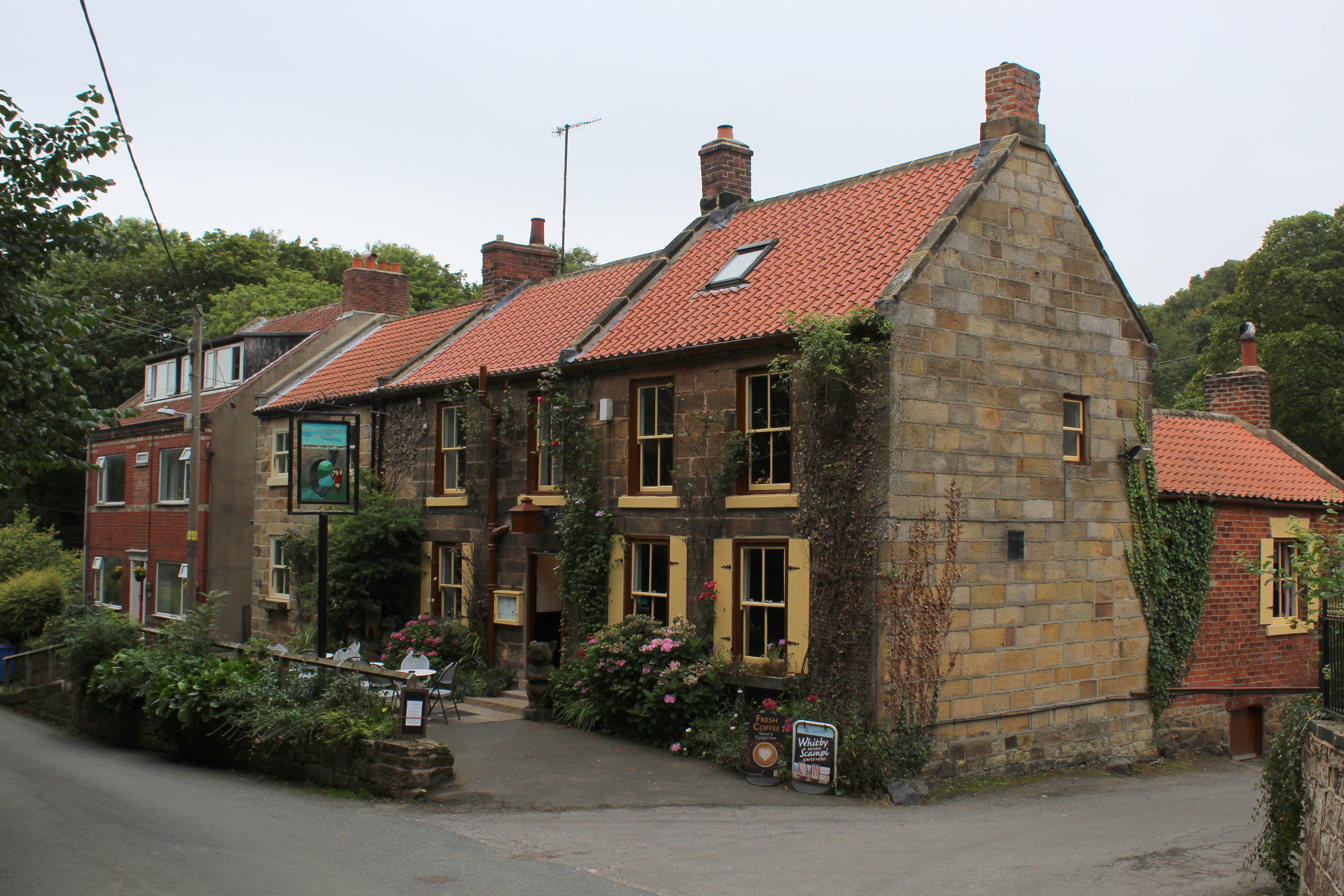
The building, in 2018

The Fox and Hounds is a historic public house in Dalehouse, a hamlet in North Yorkshire, in England.

The building was constructed in the late 18th century, as farmhouse and cottage. The two were later combined to form an inn, and the windows were replaced in the late 19th century. The building was grade II listed in 1985. In the early 21st century, Beth Mead worked in the pub.

The pub is built of stone, and has a pantile roof with stone coping and square kneelers. There are two storeys and four bays, the left two bays lower. On the front is a doorway, the windows are sashes. and there is a modern skylight.

== See also ==
- Listed buildings in Hinderwell
