= Wesleyan Methodist Chapel, Staithes =

Building in North Yorkshire, England

Coordinates: 54.5587°N 0.7934°W

The Wesleyan Methodist Chapel is a historic building in Staithes, a village in North Yorkshire, in England.

The Wesleyan Methodist Church opened a chapel in Staithes in 1824. The current building was constructed in 1866. In 1932, the Wesleyan Methodists became part of the new Methodist Church of Great Britain, which also inherited the Primitive Methodist Chapel in the village. The two congregations remained separate until 1970, when in a compromise arrangement, it was agreed to worship at the two buildings on alternate Sundays. However, in 1975, the arrangement was abandoned and both chapels opened each Sunday.

The former Primitive Methodist chapel closed in 1981, but only a minority of worshippers transferred to the former Wesleyan chapel. By 2005, it had only 10 regular worshippers, and the Sunday school had closed. The chapel itself closed in 2010 and was converted into holiday accommodation.

The church is on three floors. The chapel is on the ground floor, with a first floor balcony with raked seating, supported on cast iron beams. On the lower ground floor is the former schoolroom and various smaller rooms including a former kitchen.
