= The Mermaids of Staithes =

Folklore, British Mythology and Legends

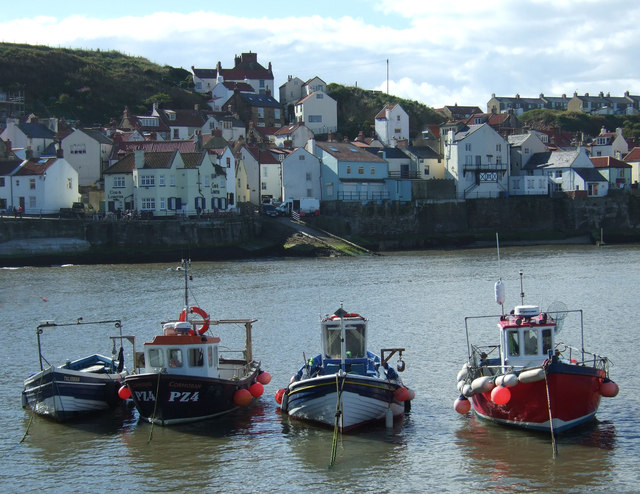
Staithes Harbour

The Mermaids of Staithes are mentioned in a legend from the village of Staithes in Yorkshire. The legend, which is set in an undisclosed period, tells of two mermaids who came ashore and were made prisoners by the villagers. Some time later the mermaids "either made their escape or were set at liberty" and when they reached the sea one of them cursed the village with a prophecy declaring that one day "The sea shall flow to Jackdaw’s Well". The other mermaid chastised her companion for revealing this information to the villagers, but the prophetic sea-maid retorted with the enigmatic statement, “I have not told them what the egg broth comes to”. The mermaids then swam away and were never seen again.

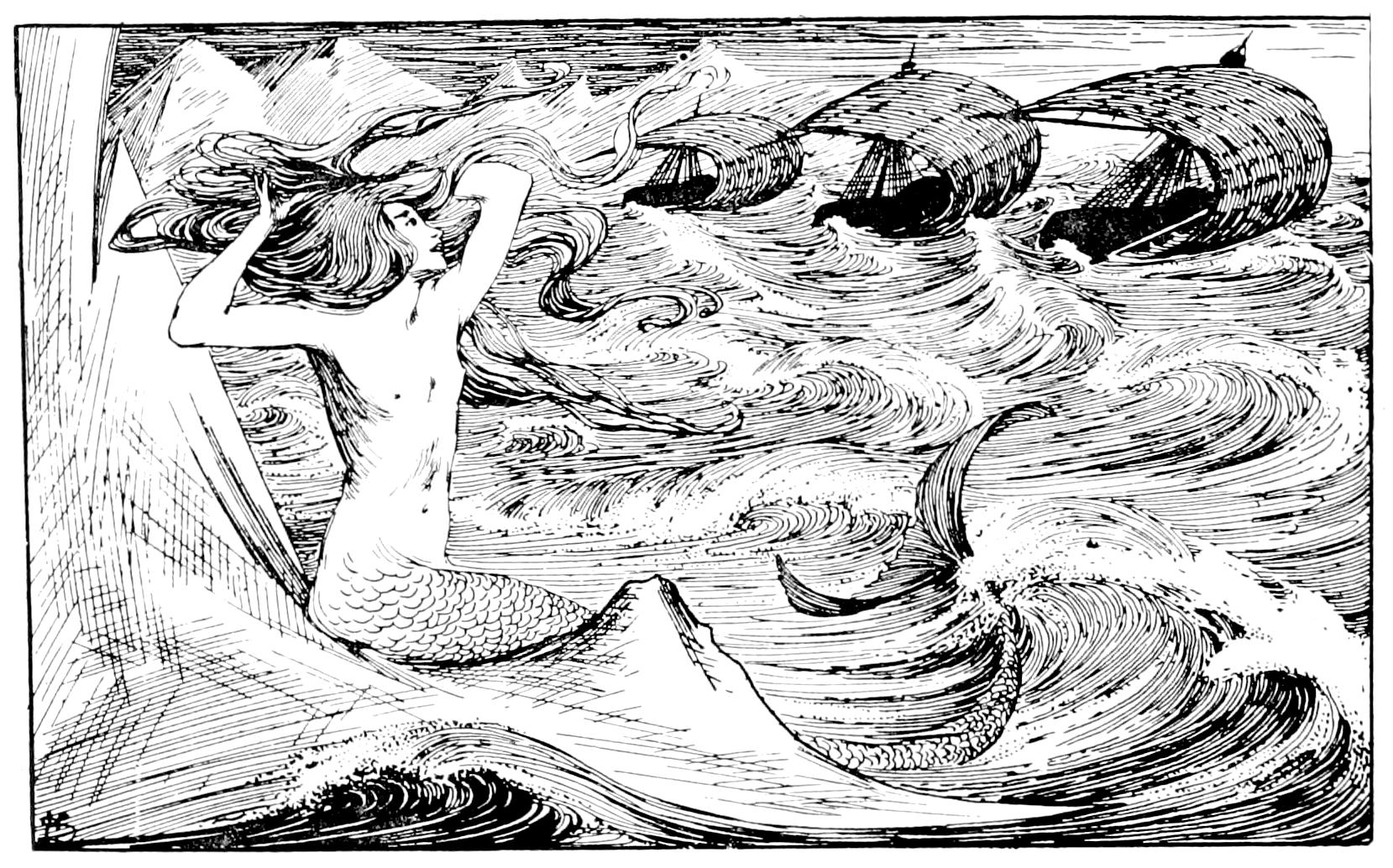
Mermaid Illustration by Helen Stratton

== Date and Motifs ==
The oldest verbal and published accounts of the legend on record date from January and March 1924 respectively, when the tale was told to the Staithes Study Group by local resident Robert Brown (1864–1941) and published in The Whitby Gazette as a three-part serialisation of his talk. Brown spent a lifetime studying the local history of Staithes and the stories he shared had been passed onto him by his grandfather and other members of the community.

Sarah Peverley and Chloe Middleton-Metcalfe, who researched the origins of the legend, have noted parallels with other mermaid stories from Cornwall, Wales, Scotland, and the Isle of Man, and have suggested that the prophetic reference to Jackdaw's Well and the egg-broth motif (which is omitted in most later retellings of the legend) indicate that the tale emerged in a much earlier period, perhaps the eighteenth century, when superstitions connecting “eggs, witches, mermaids, and maritime culture were far better known”.

=== Jackdaw's Well ===
Jackdaw's Well was a key water source for the village, containing minerals with curative and preservative properties. It was still in use in the 1890s, but by the time that Robert Brown recounted the legend in 1924 it had been destroyed by a landslide caused by coastal erosion.

=== Egg-Broth ===
Egg-broth, or the water in which eggs have been boiled, features in a number of folktales, where it is used to reveal changelings. From the sixteenth century onwards, folklore throughout the British Isles, Ireland and Western Europe also presents witches boiling eggs to create storms at sea and using eggshells as vehicles for sea travel.

=== Meteorological and Economic Change ===
Peverley and Middleton-Metcalfe propose that the Staithes legend arose in response to a series of storms that floods Staithes from the eighteenth to the nineteenth century causing great destruction of property and life. Local newspapers record the sea destroying buildings in the village from as early as September 1766 and throughout the nineteenth century in 1812, 1830, 1844, and 1852.

Robert Brown's 1924 account of the mermaids can similarly be situated against the social, meteorological and economic problems that Staithes encountered in the late nineteenth and early twentieth centuries. At this time, the frequent loss of life at sea and flooding that affected the village also coincided with the decline of Staithes' fishing industry and proposals to build a breakwater to protect the fishing community.

== The Mermaids in Art ==
Staithes is now a popular tourist destination with a thriving art-scene and annual arts festival. Two examples of public art in the village currently reference the mermaid legend. A wooden sculpture by artist Steve Iredale is situated in the garden at the Staithes Arts and Crafts Centre and a painting of a mermaid resting against rocks can be found in Gun Gutter on The Staithes Illusion Trail, created by Trompe L’Oeil artist Paul Czainski.
