= Hinderwell Methodist Church =

Chapel in Hinderwell, North Yorkshire, England

Coordinates: 54°32′19″N 0°46′28″W

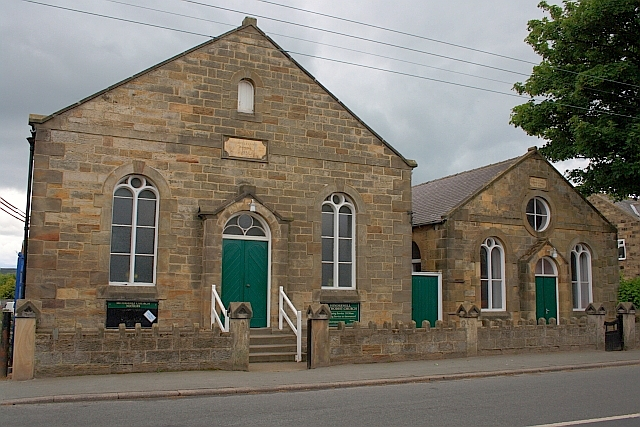
The church, in 2011

Hinderwell Methodist Church is a historic building in Hinderwell, a village in North Yorkshire, in England.

The chapel was built for the Wesleyan Methodist Church in 1873. In 1886, it was extended to provide a room for a Sunday school. By 2024, the congregation had relocated to the former Sunday school, and the chapel was sold for conversion into housing. It has been grade II listed since 1985.

The buildings are constructed of stone with Welsh slate roofs, stone copings, kneelers and finials. They form two parallel ranges, the chapel taller. Each has quoins, an eaves band, and a central round-arched doorway in a gabled projection flanked by round-arched windows. Above the chapel doorway is an inscribed plaque and a small round-headed window, and above the school doorway is a circular window. In front is a low forecourt wall with four-gabled gate piers and alternating raised rounded coping stones.

== See also ==
- Listed buildings in Hinderwell
