= Bethel Chapel, Staithes =

Listed building in North Yorkshire, England

Coordinates: 54°33′30″N 0°47′37″W

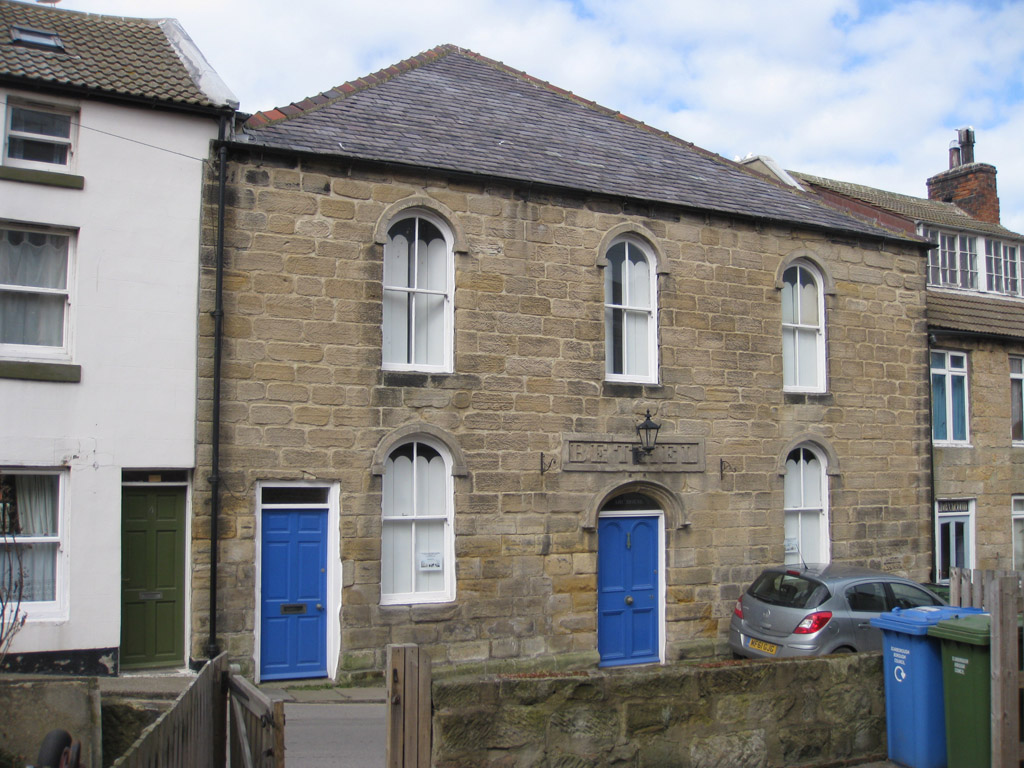
Bethel Chapel in 2013

The Bethel Chapel is a former Congregational church in Staithes, a village in North Yorkshire, in England.

A congregational chapel in Staithes opened in 1823, the first place of worship in the village. It was able to seat 400 worshippers. The building was altered in 1835. In 1965, the church withdrew from the Congregational Union of England and Wales, and thereafter lacked a resident minister. It closed in the 1980s, and was converted into holiday accommodation. The building has been grade II listed since 1973.

The church is built of sandstone on a plinth, with a hipped Welsh slate roof. It has two storeys at the front and four at the rear, and three bays. In the centre is a round-arched doorway with a fanlight and a hood mould, and to the left is a flat-headed doorway with an oblong fanlight. The windows are round-arched with impost blocks. Above the central doorway is a plaque inscribed "BETHEL" in Egyptian relief carving. At the rear is a small outhouse and cast iron area railings.

== See also ==
- Listed buildings in Hinderwell
