= Port Mulgrave, North Yorkshire =

Former port in North Yorkshire, England

Coordinates: 54.546°N 0.773°W

Port Mulgrave
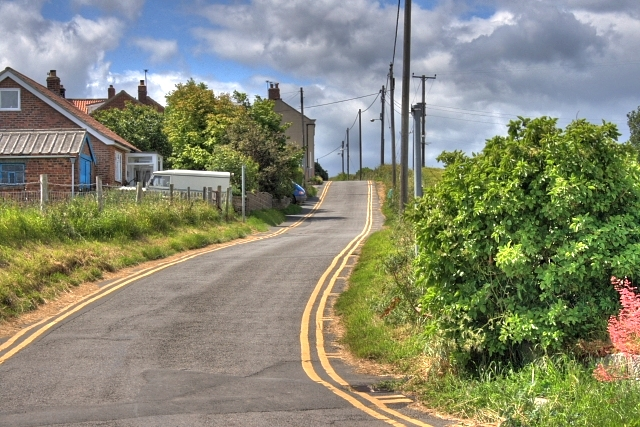
- Rosedale Lane, Port Mulgrave

- Location within North Yorkshire
- OS grid reference: NZ794174
- Civil parish: Hinderwell
- Unitary authority: North Yorkshire
- Ceremonial county: North Yorkshire
- Region: Yorkshire and the Humber
- Country: England
- Sovereign state: United Kingdom
- Post town: SALTBURN-BY-THE-SEA
- Postcode district: TS13
- Police: North Yorkshire
- Fire: North Yorkshire
- Ambulance: Yorkshire
- UK Parliament: Scarborough and Whitby

Port Mulgrave is a derelict former ironstone exporting port on the North Yorkshire coast midway between Staithes and Runswick Bay in the civil parish of Hinderwell. Rows of domestic properties and individual houses exist on the top of the cliff and the remains of the harbour can still be seen below the cliff.

Historically the locality was known as Rosedale, but to avoid confusion with the ironstone mines and iron works at Rosedale in the middle of the North York Moors, the area was renamed Port Mulgrave for the local landowner the Earl of Mulgrave.

== History ==
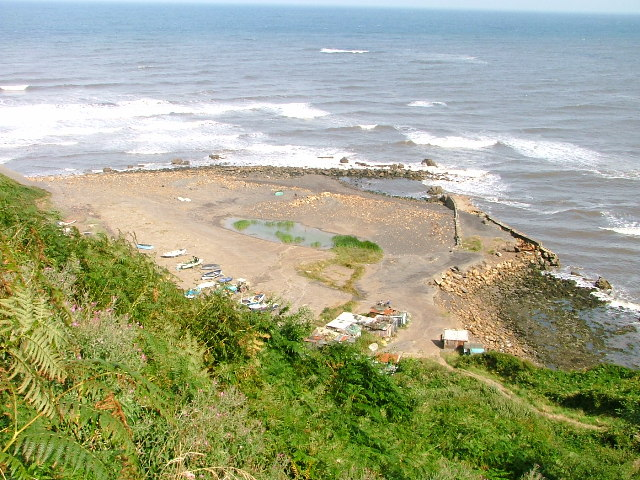
Port Mulgrave Harbour

In the 1850s Sir Charles Palmer opened an ironstone mine at Rosedale Wyke, Port Mulgrave with ironstone loaded onto small vessels from a wooden jetty. The barges were moved in and out using a paddle steamer.

A nearby harbour was constructed by Sir Charles Palmer in 1856-57 at a cost of £45,000. Initially the harbour exported ironstone to Jarrow on Tyneside to supply Palmers Shipbuilding and Iron Company Limited founded by Sir Charles Palmer. Later ironstone was sent to blast furnaces by the River Tees.

When the mine at Rosedale Wyke began to run out Sir Charles Palmer established Grinkle ironstone mine 3 miles (4.8 km) to the east near the hamlet of Dalehouse and in 1875 a narrow-gauge railway line was built to the mine. The ironstone wagons from Grinkle Mine were taken over bridges then through a tunnel under Ridge Lane down a mile long inclined tunnel on a cable railway powered by a stationary steam engine situated by the east pier then emerging in the cliff side 30 ft above sea level. The railway wagons were then led onto a gantry with bunkers on the east harbour wall ready for loading the ironstone directly into ships in the harbour. At times, as much as 2,500-3000 tons of stone per week were shipped from Port Mulgrave to Jarrow.

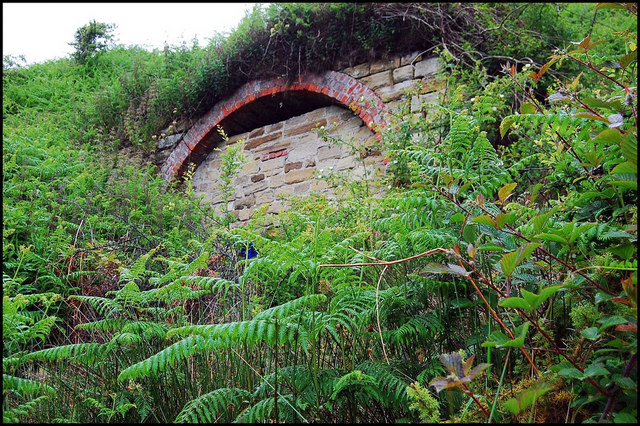
Bricked up tunnel entrance at the harbour

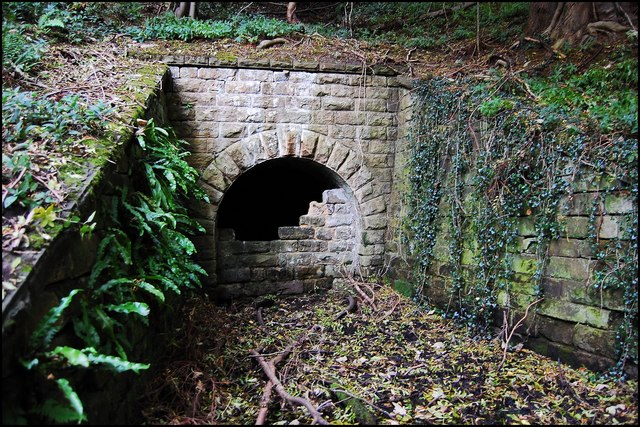
Abandoned (1916) tramway tunnel to Grinkle Mine under Ridge Lane

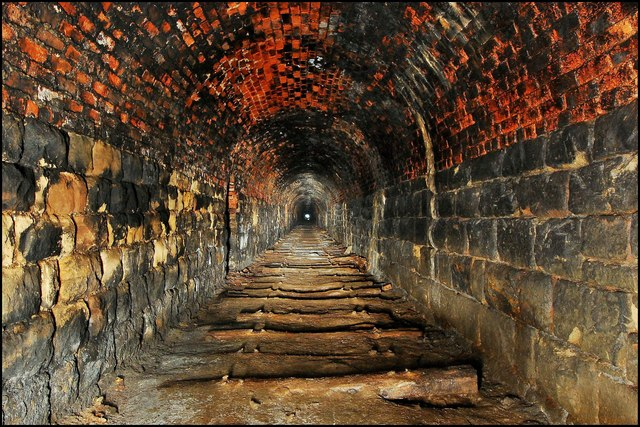
Abandoned (1916) tramway tunnel

The tunnel entrance at the harbour can still be seen but it is sealed up. In 1911 the pier gantry and boiler house were damaged by a serious fire however, the damage was repaired. In 1916 Grinkle Mine was connected to the Whitby, Redcar and Middlesbrough Union Railway thus avoiding the wartime hazards of shipping and the tramway tunnel abandoned. Port Mulgrave was a busy port for 40 years but the harbour was redundant by 1920 due to the railway link and cheaper foreign sources of ironstone becoming available. After falling into disuse the harbour was left to decay. In 1934 Grinkle Mine was abandoned, then the harbour machinery was sold off as scrap and the gantry accidentally destroyed by a fire. The west harbour breakwater wall was deliberately destroyed by the Royal Engineers to prevent its use as part of any German invasion during World War II.

== Geography ==
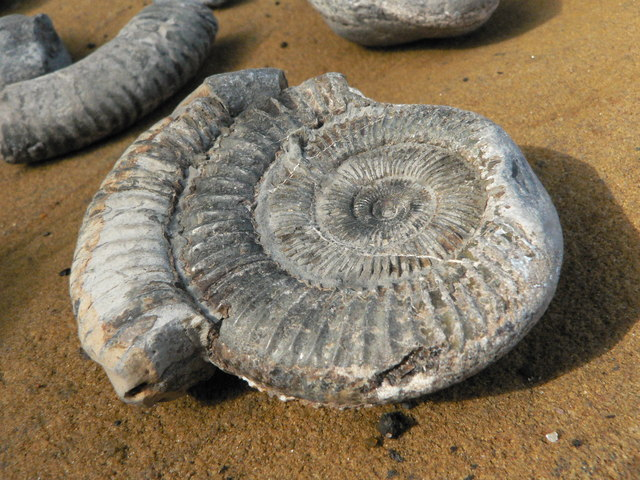
Ammonite fossil at Port Mulgrave

The geology of the cliffs is Whitby Mudstone Formation (including alum shale) on top of Cleveland Ironstone Formation with traces of jet in the shale.

The official access route to the beach is down a steep path leading to a wooden ladder. The cliff area is subject to coastal erosion, landslips and path closures, and the tide can cut off beach walkers. In 2022, the steps down to the beach collapsed during a landslip making it difficult for visitors to access safely.

Ammonite, dinosaur and reptile fossils can be found on the foreshore and in the cliffs and because of this it is a Site of Special Scientific Interest. However, digging fossils out of the crumbling cliffs and screes is dangerous. The beach is composed of rock, sand and stones. The Cleveland Way walking route passes along the top of the cliff.

== Economy ==
Some inshore fishing using cobles takes place from the harbour. Fishing cabins made from flotsam and found materials can be seen by the cliffs next to the harbour.

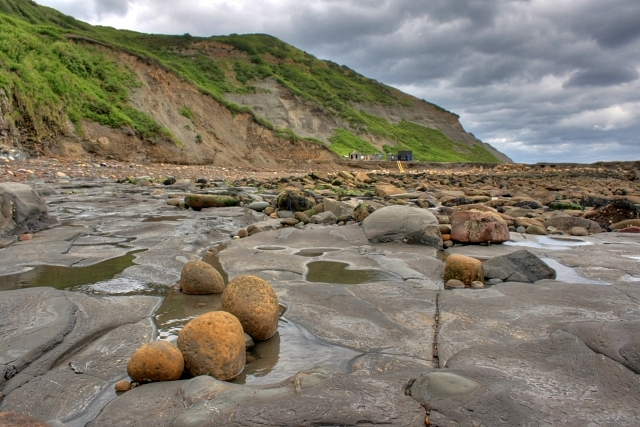
Cliffs and foreshore at Port Mulgrave looking north

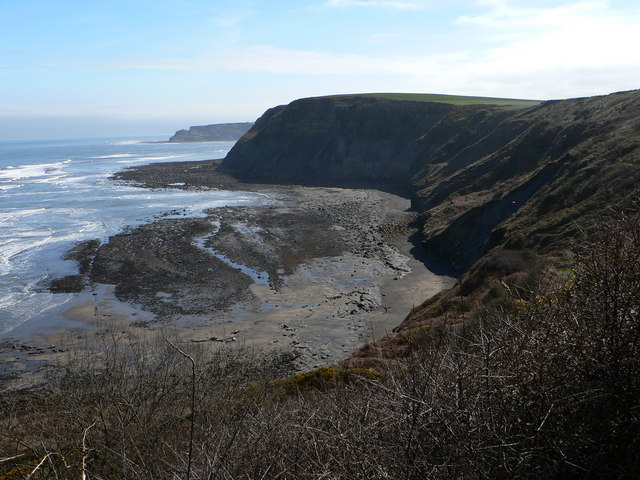
Cliffs at Port Mulgrave looking south east

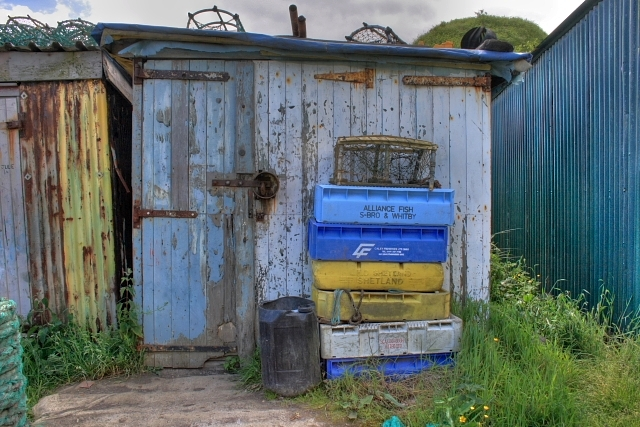
Fisherman's hut

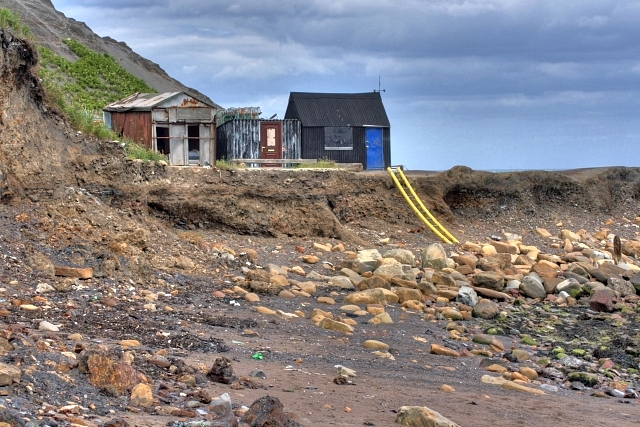
East harbour wall and wooden ladder

== See also ==
- Listed buildings in Hinderwell
- Grinkle Mine
