= Primitive Methodist Chapel, Staithes =

Chapel in North Yorkshire, England

Coordinates: 54°33′30″N 0°47′35″W

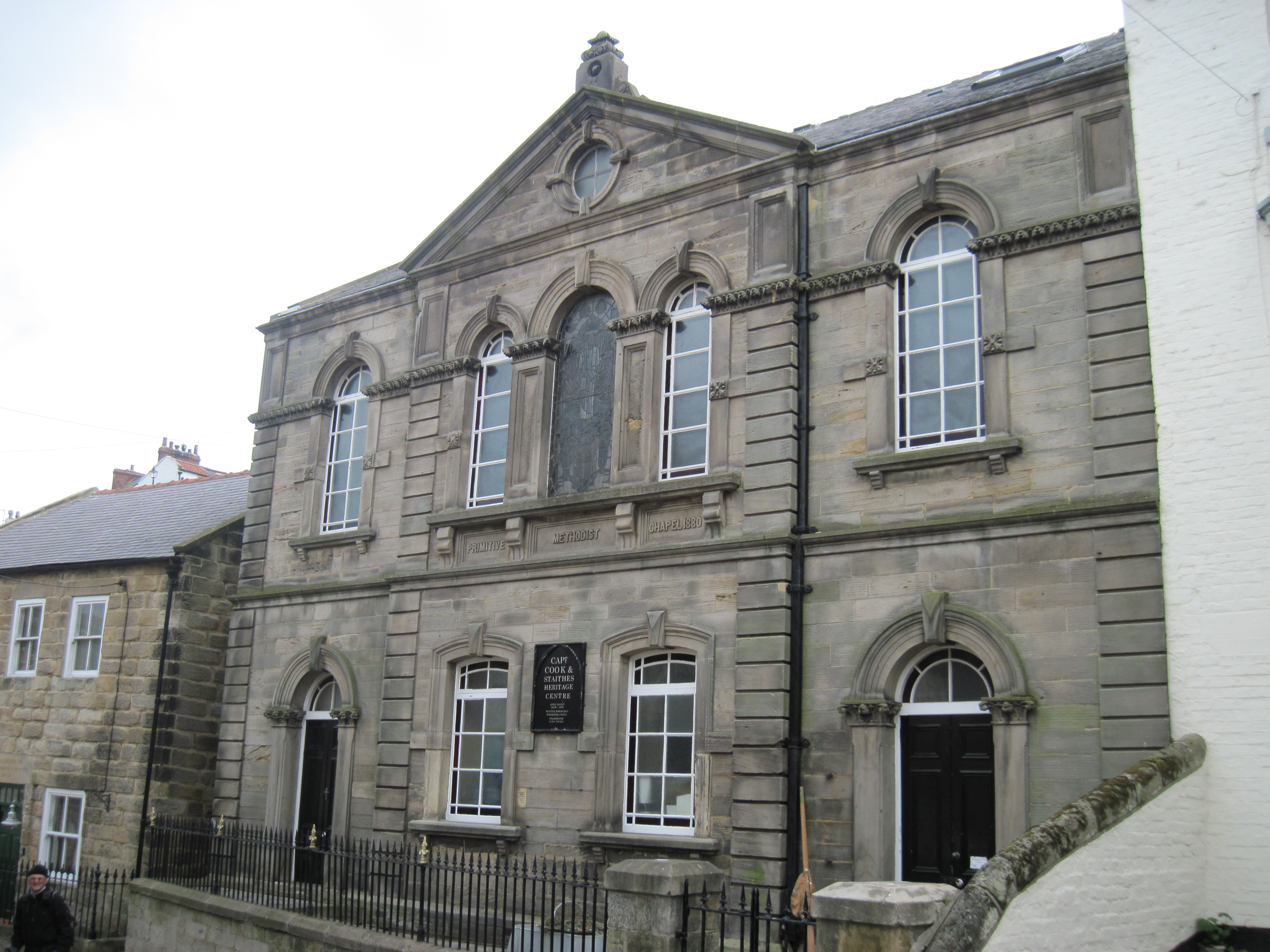
The former chapel, now Staithes Museum

The Primitive Methodist Chapel is a historic building in Staithes, a village in North Yorkshire, in England.

Primitive Methodism first reached Staithes in the 1820s, and a chapel was completed in 1858. However, it soon proved too small, and a new chapel was built next door in 1880. The old chapel was converted into a Sunday school. The chapel became known for its music, and in the 1940s a choral quintet led by Willie Verrill was broadcast on BBC Radio on several occasions.

In 1932, the Primitive Methodists became part of the new Methodist Church of Great Britain, which also inherited the Wesleyan Methodist Chapel in the village. The two congregations remained separate until 1970, when in a compromise arrangement, it was agreed to worship at the two buildings on alternate Sundays. However, in 1975, the arrangement was abandoned and both chapels opened each Sunday. In 1981, membership at the former Primitive Methodist chapel had declined so much that it was unable to find nominees for legally required posts, and instead opted to close.

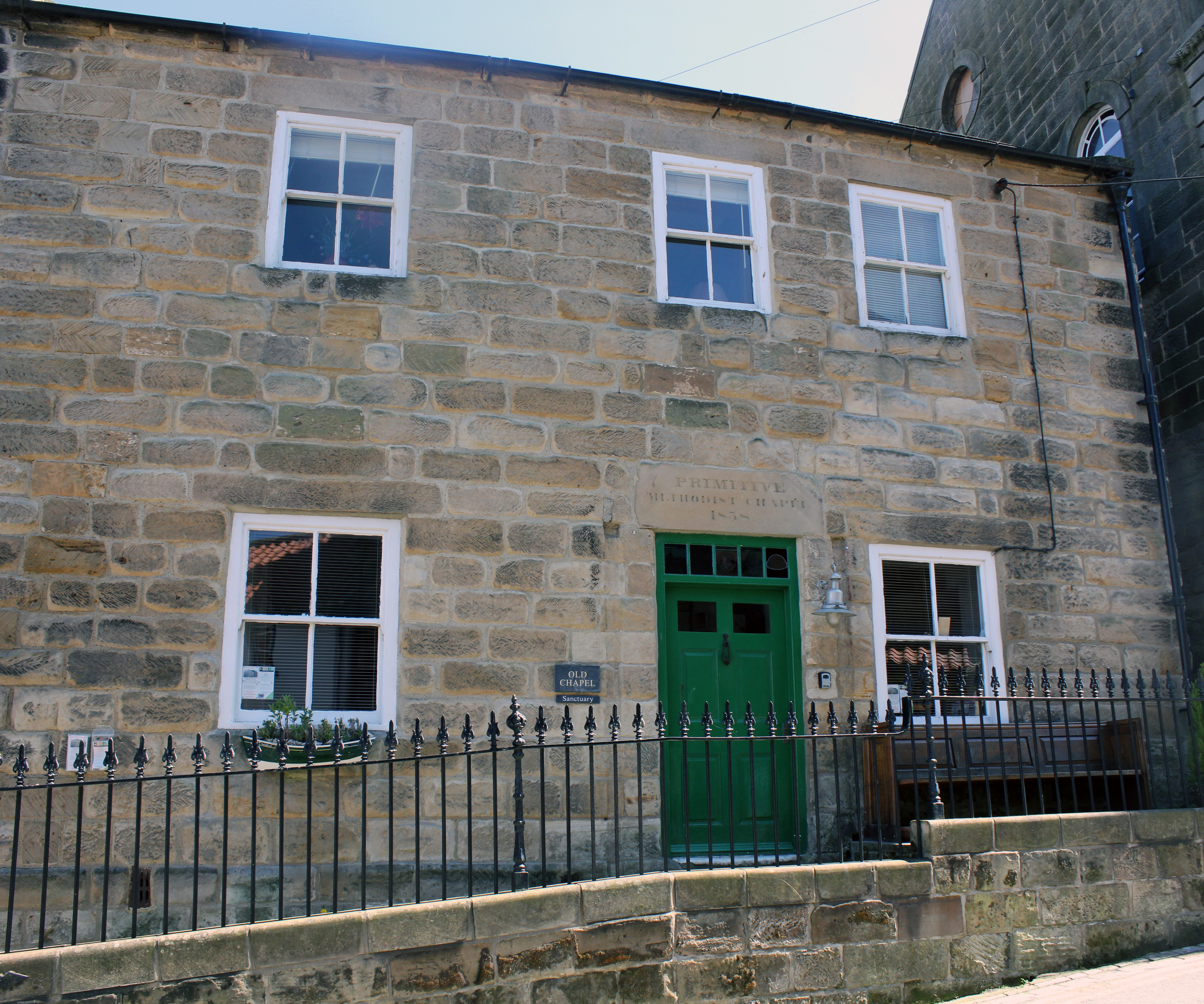
Staithes Old Chapel, in 2021

In 1993, the chapel was converted into the Staithes Museum, focusing on local industries, maritime and artistic heritage, with a focus on James Cook's time in the village. In the early 2000s, the school was converted into a cafe, and in 2015 it became a holiday let, named Staithes Old Chapel.

== Architecture ==
=== Staithes Museum ===
The museum in built of stone on a plinth, with rusticated quoins, an ornamented string course and a Welsh slate roof. There are two storeys and five bays, the middle three bays projecting under a pediment containing an oculus with keystones. In the outer bays are round-arched doorways with architraves, pilasters with leafy capitals, and keystones. Between these are two windows with segmental heads, and the upper floor contains round-arched windows with architraves and keystones. In front are cast iron area railings with fleur-de-lys standards. It was grade II listed in 1973.

=== Staithes Old Chapel ===
The former chapel is built of stone on a plinth, and has a Welsh slate roof with stone copings. There are two storeys and three bays. On the front is a projecting gabled porch, the windows are sashes, and the front area is enclosed by cast iron railings. It was separately grade II listed in 1973.

== See also ==
- Listed buildings in Hinderwell
