= St Hilda's Church, Hinderwell =

Church in Hinderwell, North Yorkshire, England

Coordinates: 54°32′33″N 0°46′43″W

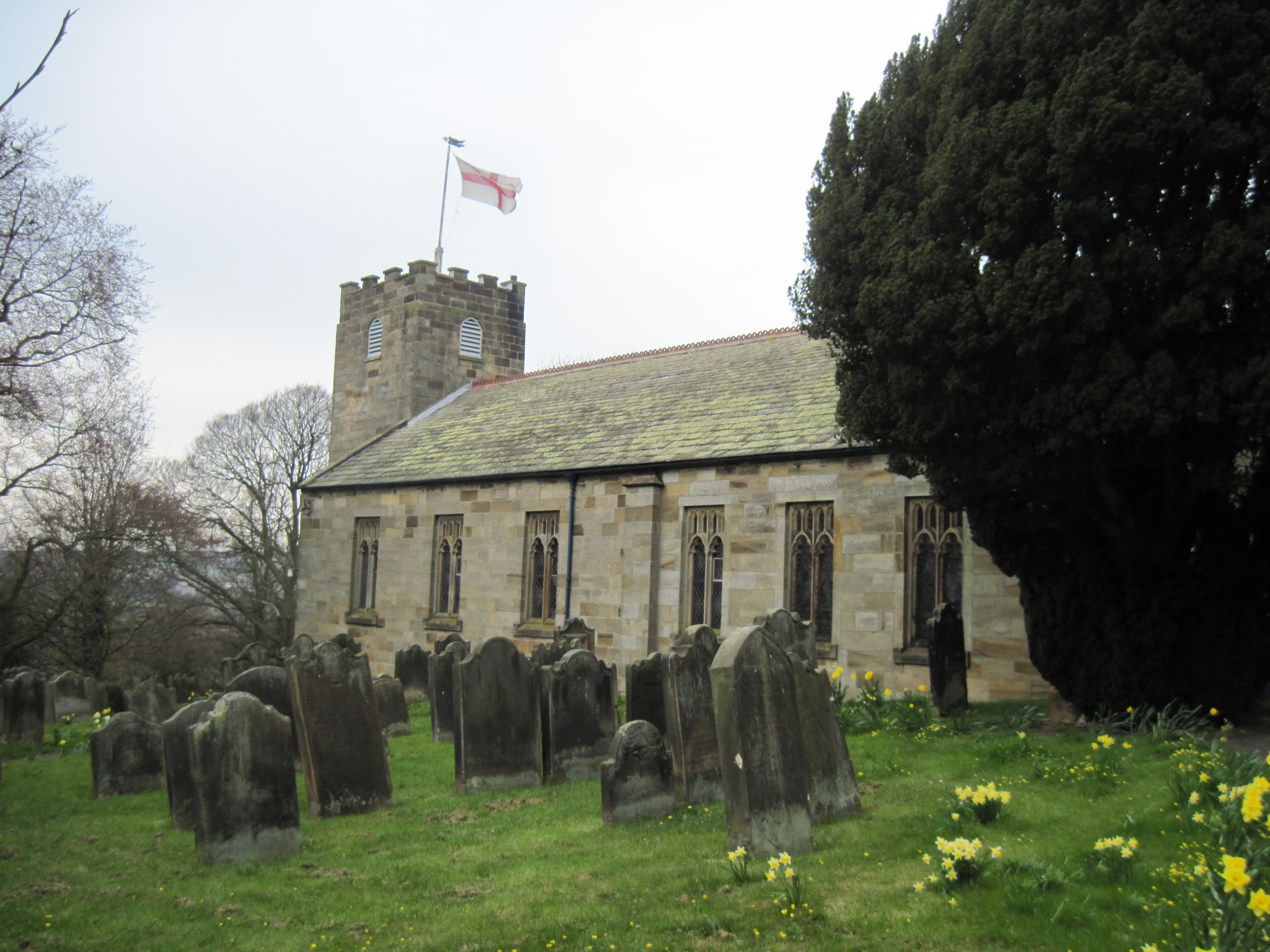
The church, in 2013

St Hilda's Church is the parish church of Hinderwell, a village in North Yorkshire, in England.

A church was built on the site in the Saxon period, and rebuilt in the 12th century. There is a holy well in its churchyard. The old church was demolished and the current church was built in 1773, while the tower was rebuilt in 1817. The church was restored in 1895, and was grade II listed in 1969.

The church is built of stone with a Welsh slate roof, and consists of a nave, a chancel and a west tower. It measures 68 feet (21 m) by 29 feet (8.8 m). The tower has two stages, a west doorway, and an embattled parapet. The windows are square-headed with Perpendicular tracery, and at the east end is a Venetian window. Inside, part of a Norman piscina and some Saxon carvings survive from the old church. There is a Gothic oak screen, and a west gallery and organ which were moved from Selby Abbey.

St Hilda's Well in the churchyard is probably mediaeval and was restored in 1912. The wellhead is built of stone, the side walls are rusticated, and it carries a flat slab roof above the spring. On the well is an inscription relating to the restoration.

== See also ==
- Listed buildings in Hinderwell
