= Hinderwell =

Village and civil parish in North Yorkshire, England

Coordinates: 54°32′17″N 0°46′25″W

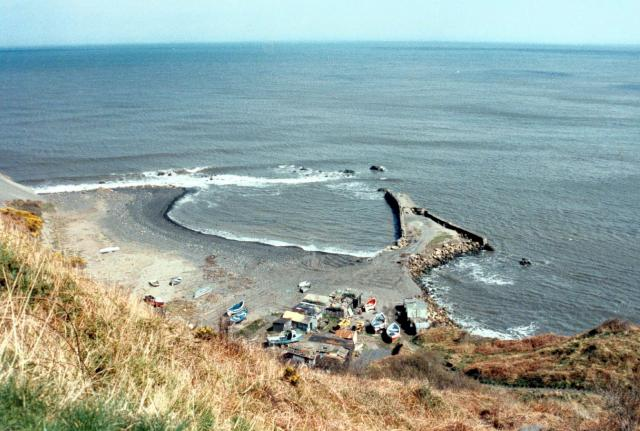
- Derelict harbour at Port Mulgrave, near Hinderwell, North Yorkshire

- Location within North Yorkshire
- Population: 1,875 (2011 census)
- OS grid reference: NZ792167
- Civil parish: Hinderwell
- Unitary authority: North Yorkshire
- Ceremonial county: North Yorkshire
- Region: Yorkshire and the Humber
- Country: England
- Sovereign state: United Kingdom
- Post town: SALTBURN-BY-THE-SEA
- Postcode district: TS13
- Dialling code: 01947
- Police: North Yorkshire
- Fire: North Yorkshire
- Ambulance: Yorkshire
- UK Parliament: Scarborough and Whitby

Hinderwell is a village and civil parish in North Yorkshire, England which lies within the North York Moors National Park, about a mile from the coast on the A174 road between the towns of Loftus and Whitby.

The 2011 UK census states Hinderwell parish had a population of 1,875, a decrease on the 2001 UK census figure of 2,013. Hinderwell was the most northerly parish in the Scarborough Borough Council area until its abolition in 2023. Hinderwell is mentioned in the Domesday Book of 1086 as Hildrewell, which is said to derive from the well of Saint Hilda of Whitby, the Abbess of Whitby Abbey. St Hilda's Church, Hinderwell is named for her, as it St Hilda's Well in the churchyard. Hinderwell Methodist Church was built in 1873.

The civil parish of Hinderwell encompasses:

- the village of Staithes,
- the hamlet of Port Mulgrave (NZ794174),
- the hamlet of Runswick Bay (NZ806161), a popular beach resort with a lifeboat service operated independently since 1982,
- the hamlet of Dalehouse (NZ777180), which contains the Fox and Hounds pub.

From 1974 to 2023 it was part of the Borough of Scarborough, it is now administered by the unitary North Yorkshire Council.

== Culture and events ==
Hinderwell lies less than a mile inland from the Cleveland Way National Trail, along with the National Trust Rosedale Cliffs. NZ798174

== Transport ==
Up until 1958 the area was served by Staithes and Hinderwell railway stations. Buses to Whitby, Loftus, and Middlesbrough stop here.

== Sport ==
=== Football ===
Hinderwell Football Club is based on Sports Park, on the south side of the village on High Street, and compete in the Eskvale & Cleveland Football League.

=== Cricket ===
Hinderwell Cricket Club is located on Sports Park, on the south side of the village on High Street. The club have a Midweek XI team that compete in the Esk Valley Evening League and a junior section play in the Whitby & District Junior Cricket League.

== Notable residents ==
- Richard Osbaldeston, later Bishop of Carlisle and Bishop of London, was instituted as rector of Hinderwell in 1715.
- Beth Mead grew up in the village and made her debut for the senior England women's national football team in 2018, represented England in the World Cup in 2019, and the Euros in 2022.
