= Staithes =

Village in North Yorkshire, England

Coordinates: 54°33′19″N 0°47′36″W

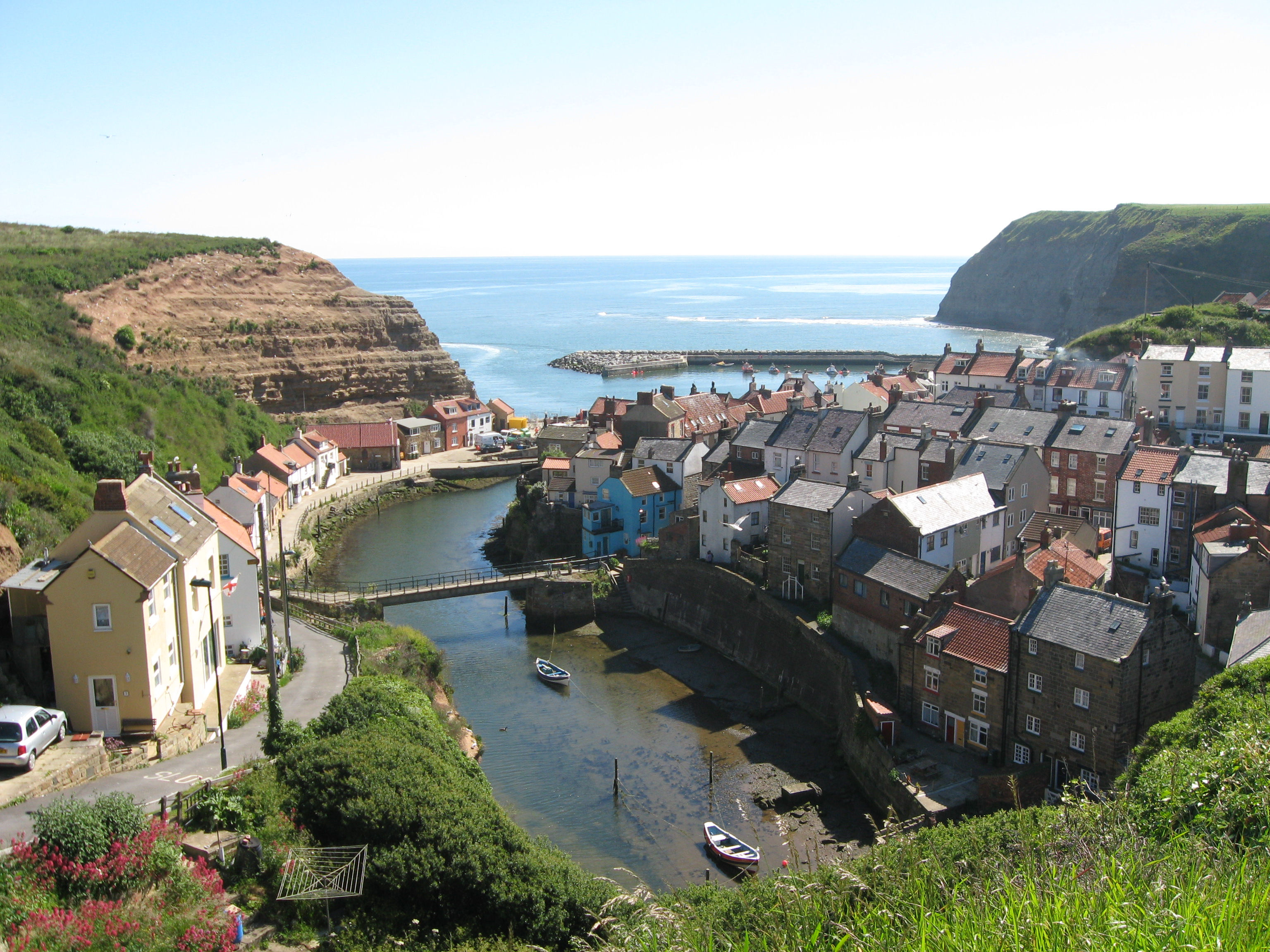
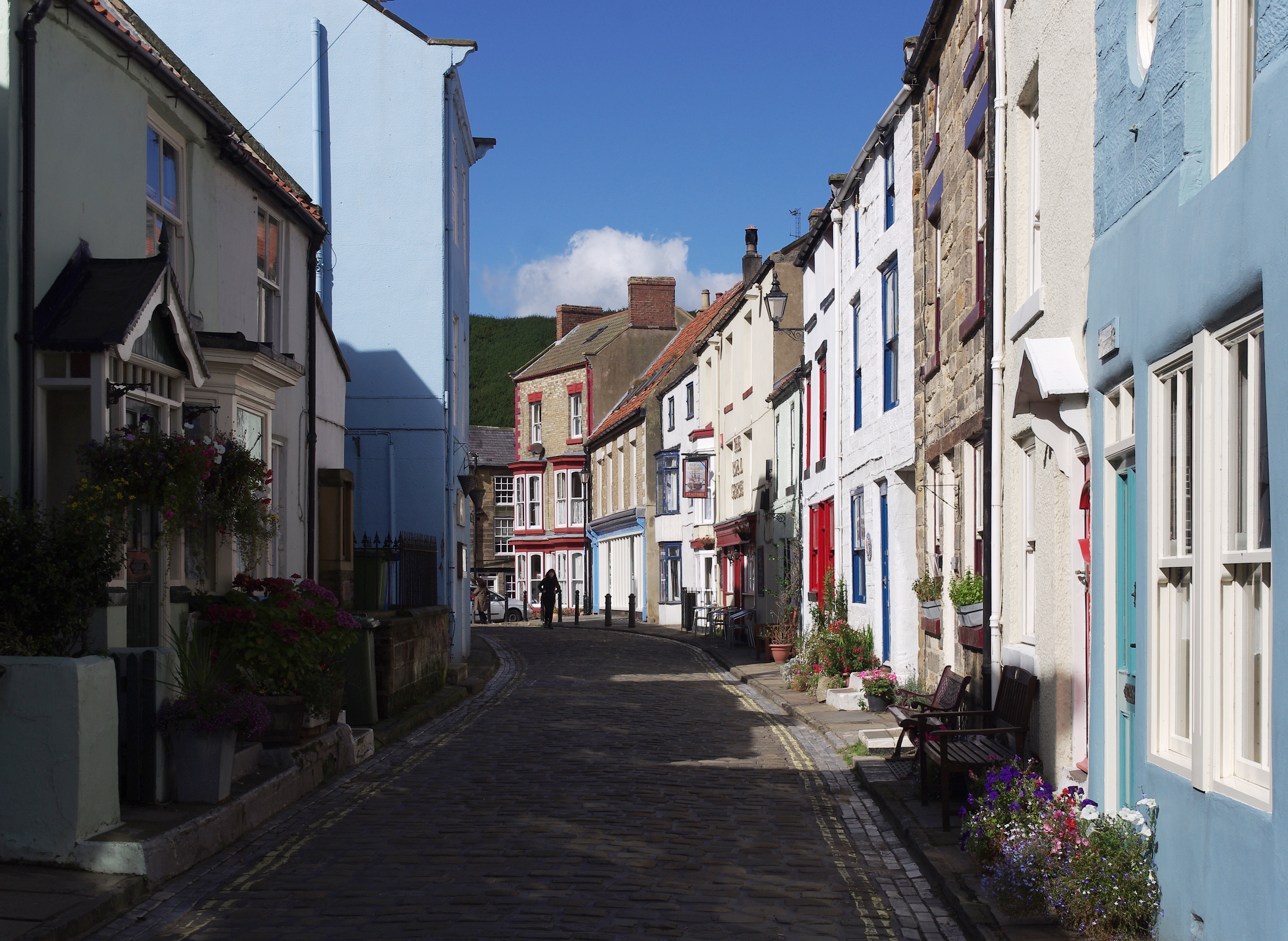
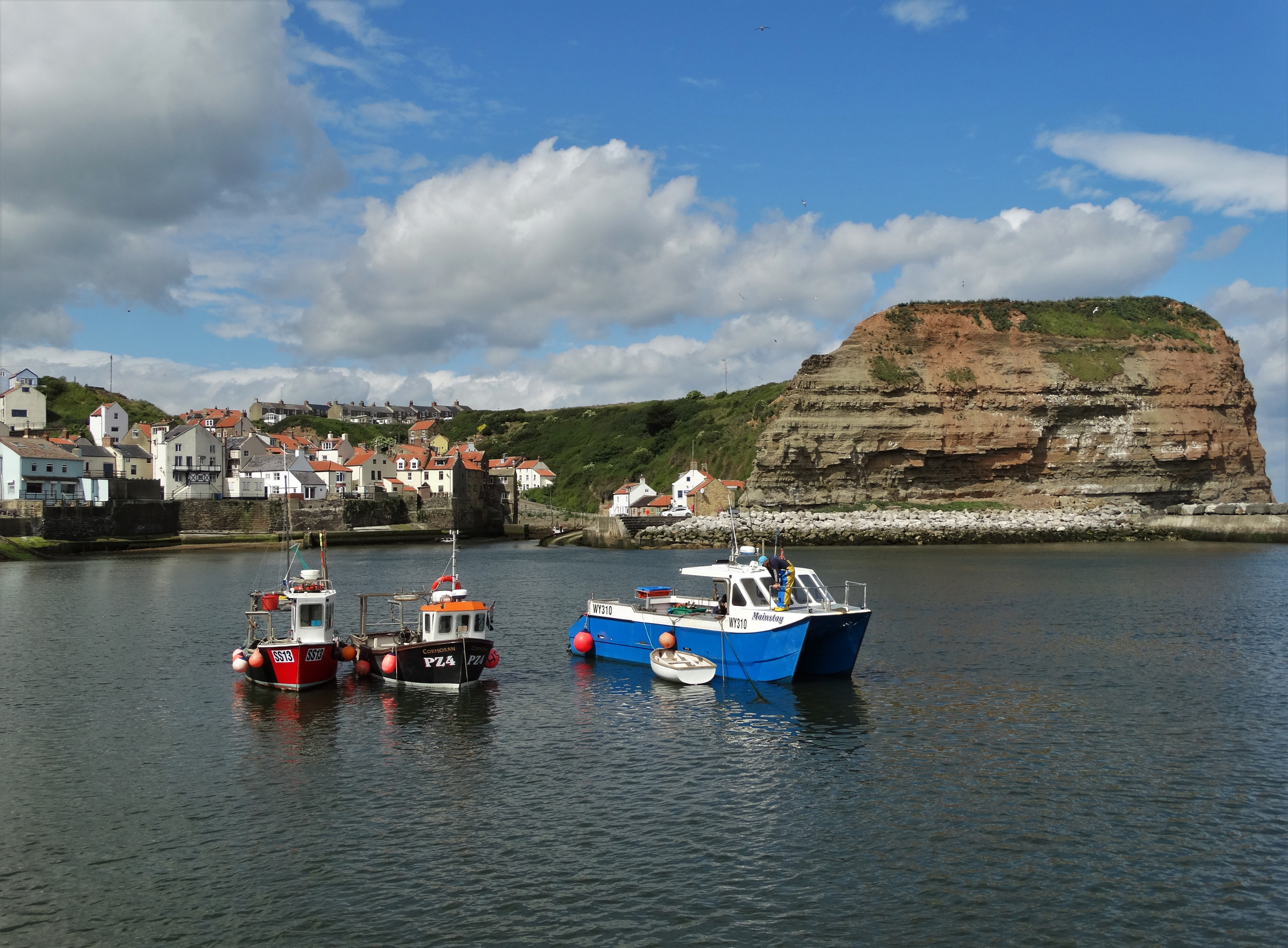
- Hill top view High Street Harbour

- Location within North Yorkshire
- OS grid reference: NZ779185
- Civil parish: Hinderwell
- Unitary authority: North Yorkshire
- Ceremonial county: North Yorkshire
- Region: Yorkshire and the Humber
- Country: England
- Sovereign state: United Kingdom
- Post town: SALTBURN-BY-THE-SEA
- Postcode district: TS13
- Dialling code: 01947
- Police: North Yorkshire
- Fire: North Yorkshire
- Ambulance: Yorkshire
- UK Parliament: Scarborough and Whitby

Staithes (locally /'stɪəz/) is a village in North Yorkshire, England, by the border between the unitary authorities of North Yorkshire and Redcar and Cleveland. The area on the Redcar and Cleveland side is known as Cowbar. Formerly a centre of fishing and mining, Staithes is now a tourist destination in the North York Moors National Park.

It is in the civil parish of Hinderwell. From 1974 to 2023 it was part of the Borough of Scarborough. It is now administered by the unitary North Yorkshire Council.

== History ==
The name Staithes derives from Old English and means landing-place. It has been suggested that it is so named after being the port for the nearby Seaton Hall and Hinderwell. The spelling Steers or Steeas is sometimes used to indicate the traditional local dialect pronunciation /stɪəz/. The demonym given to people from the village is "Steerser".

At the turn of the 20th century there were 80 full-time fishing boats putting out from Staithes. A hundred years later there are still a few part-time fishermen. There is a long tradition of using the coble (a traditional fishing vessel) in Staithes.

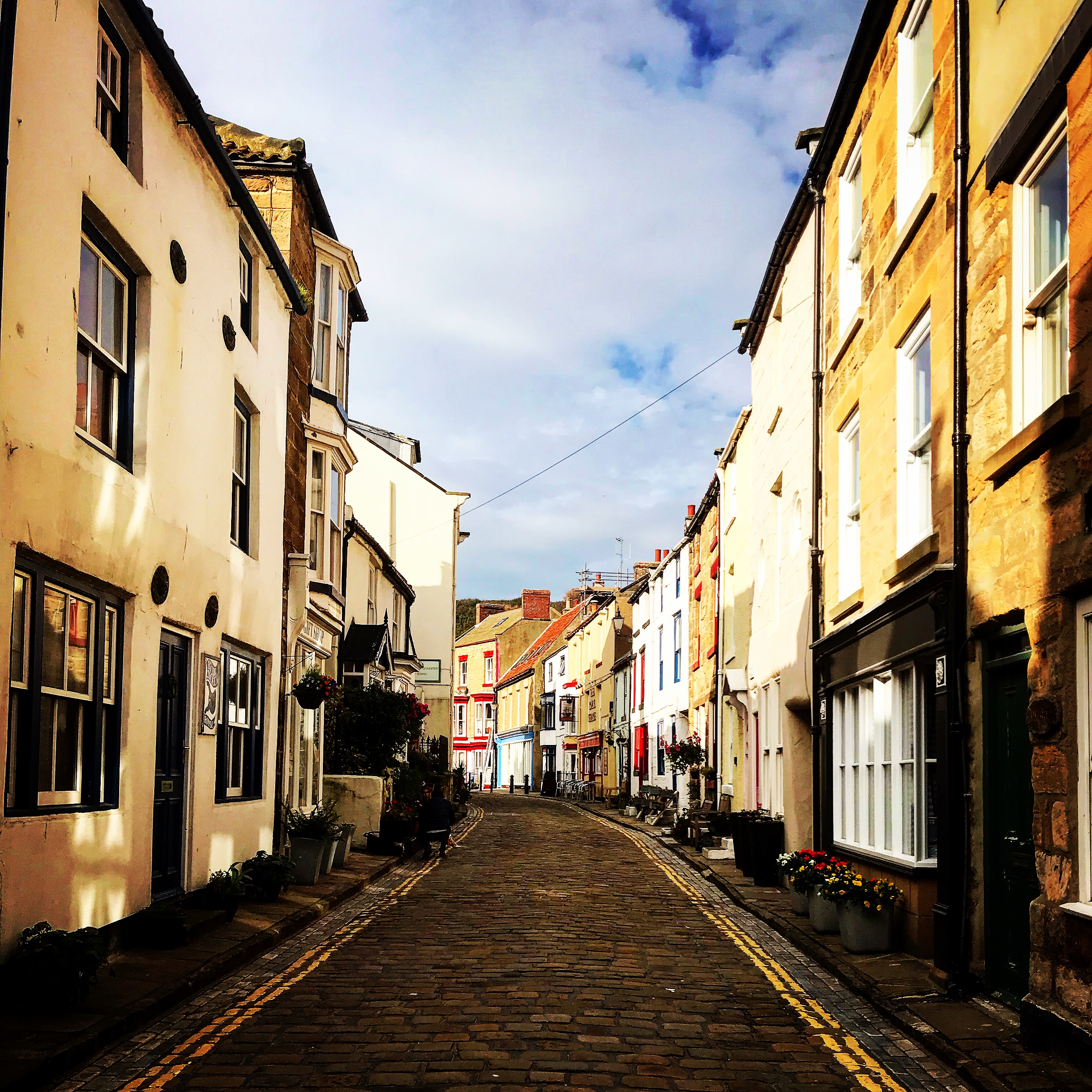
Staithes

Staithes has numerous narrow streets and passageways; one of these, Dog Loup, with a width of just 18 inches (46 cm), is claimed to be the narrowest alley in the world. It was reported in 1997 that the Royal Mail were encouraging the occupants of Staithes to number their houses instead of relying on names. Whilst the usual postie had no difficulty with the narrow streets and cottages, relief staff were confused. Royal Mail also claimed it would aid the efficiency of their postal machines, which automatically read the addresses.

== Geography ==
The oldest and best-known part of the village is clustered around the sheltered harbour, bounded by high cliffs and two long breakwaters. The more modern upper village is at the top of the hill, around the junction of the High Street and the A174 road.

A mile to the west is Boulby Cliff where, for a brief period, alum was extracted from quarried shale and used as a mordant to improve the strength and permanency of colour when cloth was dyed. The mining operation ended when a cheaper chemical method was developed. The ruined remnants of the mines can be seen from the cliff top by walkers on the Cleveland Way between Staithes and Skinningrove.

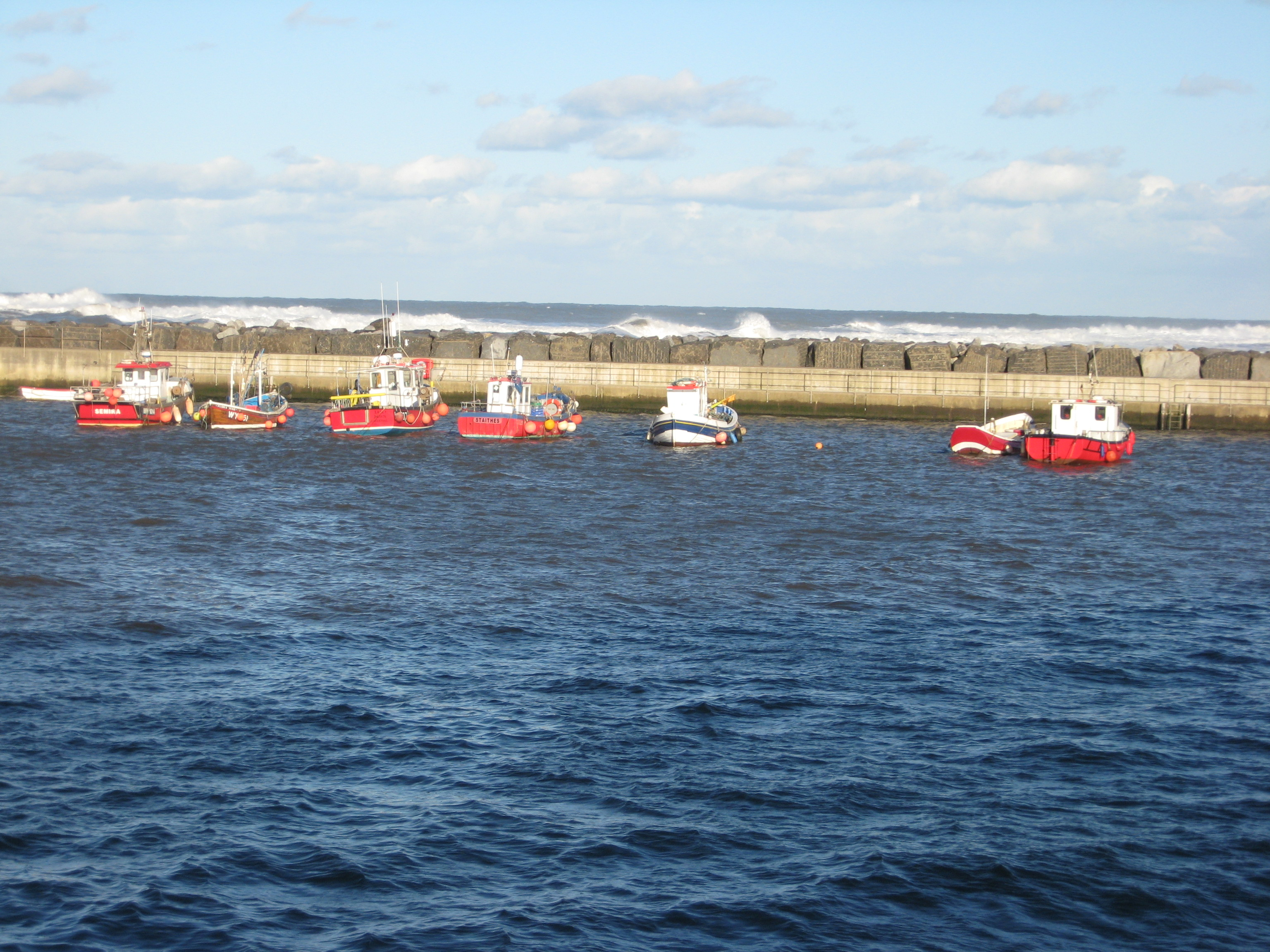
Breakwater

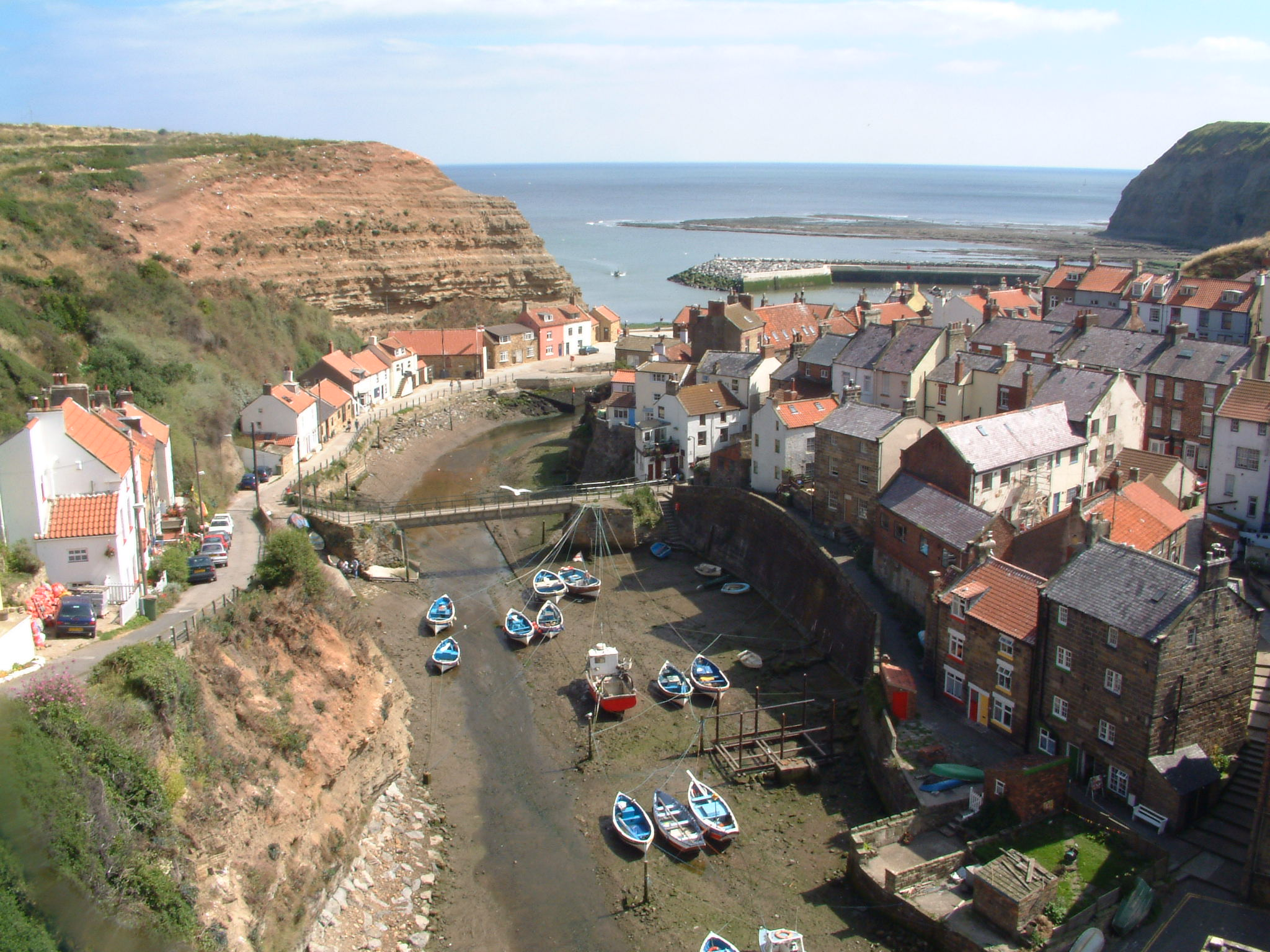
View of the harbour from above

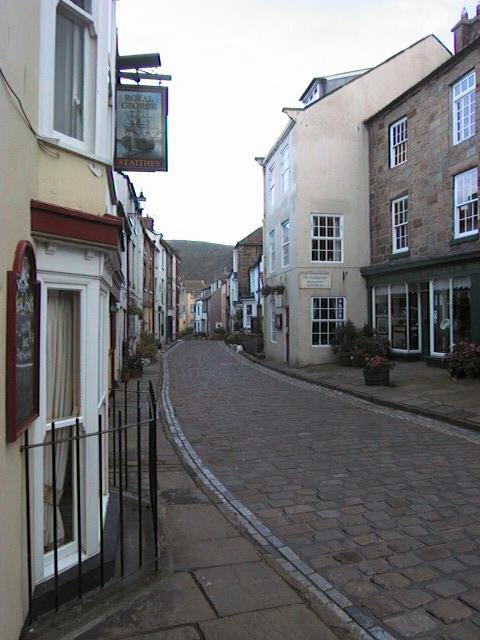
A street in Staithes

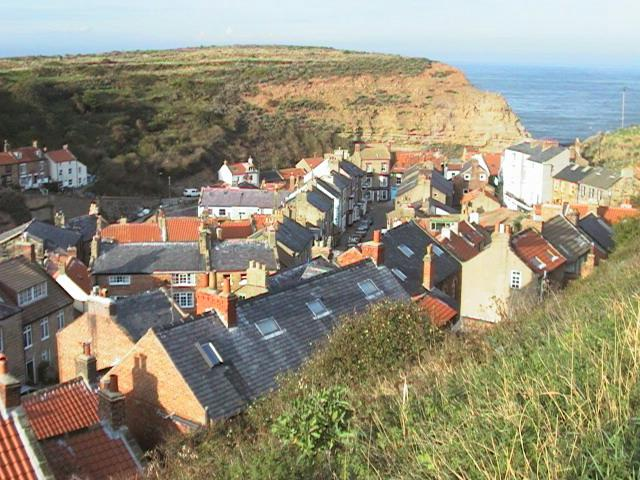
Staithes rooftops

=== Geology ===
Staithes is a destination for geologists researching the Jurassic (Lias), strata in the cliffs surrounding the village. In the early 1990s a rare fossil of a seagoing dinosaur was discovered after a rockfall between Staithes and Port Mulgrave to the south. This fossil has been the focus of a project to remove the ancient bones of the creature. Port Mulgrave remains one of the best places on the northern coast to find fossils of ammonites and many visitors spend hours cracking open the shaly rocks on the shoreline in the hope of finding a perfect specimen.

== Churches ==
Anglican worship takes place at St Peter's Church, Staithes and the Roman Catholic Our Lady Star of the Sea Church, Staithes was built in 1885. There were five churches in the village: St Peter's Church (Church of England), Our Lady Star of the Sea (Roman Catholic), the Bethel Chapel, the Primitive Methodist Chapel and the Wesleyan Methodist Chapel. Staithes retained two Methodist churches, even after the Methodist Union, but the Wesleyan Methodist Chapel closed in 2010 after a financial review.

== Transport ==
Between 1883 and 1958 the village was served by Staithes railway station, on the Whitby, Redcar and Middlesbrough Union Railway. The southern end of the village is bisected by the A174 road between Thornaby-on-Tees and Whitby.

== Culture and events ==
The permanent population of Staithes has decreased since the 1970s owing to the decline of fishing and mining and an increase in second homes and holiday cottages. Because of this many of the village's traditions are no longer practised. Staithes Bonnets were traditionally worn by the women inhabitants of the village, with some older residents still wearing them daily in the 1990s. The cotton bonnets were sewn by hand and helped to protect the wearer's hair and face when carrying out fishing work. The bonnets were traditionally white, but colourful and patterned bonnets came in during the Second World War when fabric was rationed, and the women would recycle their dresses into headgear. A black bonnet was worn during the deep mourning period and was then swapped, after a period of 2–3 years, for a mauve or lavender bonnet during half-mourning. There are a few women left in the village who still sew Staithes Bonnets.

The Mermaids of Staithes is a legend concerning the capture of two mermaids who came to Staithes and were imprisoned by the villagers. Upon escaping, one of the mermaids cursed the village, announcing that one day "the sea would flow to Jackdaw's Well". When her mermaid companion chastised her for revealing this information to the villagers, she replied enigmatically, "I have not told them what the egg broth comes to". The oldest oral and published accounts of the legend on record date from January and March 1924 respectively, when the tale was told to the Staithes Study Group by local resident Robert Brown and published in The Whitby Gazette as a serialised version of his talk. Brown spent a lifetime studying the local history of Staithes and the stories he shared had been passed on to him by his grandfather and other members of the community. Sarah Peverley and Chloe Middleton-Metcalfe record notable parallels with other mermaid stories from Cornwall, Wales, Scotland and the Isle of Man and have suggested that the egg-broth motif may indicate that the legend emerged in a much earlier period, perhaps the eighteenth century, "when the negative associations between eggs, witches, mermaids and maritime culture were far better known". They also argue that the reference to Jackdaw's Well (which had been destroyed by a landslide by the time Brown recounted the legend) makes sense only if the legend was circulating from at least the nineteenth century, when it was an important landmark "in the natural and social fabric of Staithes's past".

Superstitions in Staithes had a part in everyday life. One of the best-known village superstitions is the aversion to say the word "pig". It is believed saying this word will bring bad luck. Fishermen who heard this word would refuse to go to sea in case they drowned. Instead, locals will call the animals "grecians", "grunters", "oinkers" or "four-legged creatures" or spell out the word. The word "grecian" has no link to Greece and is thought by local historians to come from Old Norse but this has not been proven. Ironically there is a pig farm overlooking the village. Previously this belief applied to all four-legged animals, including dogs and cats; pigs were considered the unluckiest animal of them all. The superstition today pertains only to pigs. Other superstitions include the belief that if all the jackdaws leave Cowbar that side of the village will fall into the sea. It was considered bad luck to undertake a sea trip if a fisherman met a woman wearing white linen. Winding yarn after dark was also unlucky if family members were at sea and eggs had to be referred to as "roundabouts" to avoid back luck.

Men of Staithes are a fishermen's choir who perform sea shanties and hymns in the village.

The Roxby Run is a local pub crawl. It starts at The Fox and Hounds in the nearby village of Dalehouse then goes to Staithes Athletic Club, The Captain Cook Inn, The Black Lion (now closed) and The Royal George before finishing at The Cod and Lobster on the harbour front.

Staithes Museum is in the disused primitive Methodist chapel on Staithes High Street. The museum was set up by Reginald Firth in 1993 and houses a collection relating to the history of Staithes and Captain James Cook who lived in the village as a teenager. In 2019 the Museum was taken on by a charitable trust.

Staithes and Runswick RNLI Lifeboat Weekend takes place in August each year and features a nightgown parade. The event raises money for, and encourages participation with the Staithes and Runswick Lifeboat Station.

Staithes Festival of Arts and Heritage takes place in September each year. The first event was held in 2012. Houses and other properties throughout the village open their doors to the public as pop-up galleries, creating a trail through the village. Events celebrating the heritage of Staithes are held.

=== Staithes in popular culture ===
Several episodes of The Fast Show feature sketches filmed in Staithes.

The series Old Jack's Boat, starring Bernard Cribbins, was set and filmed in Staithes, with Old Jack's house located at 4 Cowbar Bank.

The film Phantom Thread features scenes filmed in Staithes.

The 2020 Christmas special of Mortimer & Whitehouse: Gone Fishing saw Bob Mortimer and Paul Whitehouse filmed in Staithes. A local tour guide noted that the village's appearance on the show had caused interest in the village to go "ballistic".

In the series Hetty Wainthropp Investigates, Staithes doubled as the coastal village of 'Kirkewell' in the episode "Blood Relations" (1998).

== Media ==
Local news and television programmes are provided by BBC North East and Cumbria and ITV Tyne Tees. Television signals are received from the Bilsdale TV transmitter and the local relay transmitter. Local radio stations are BBC Radio Tees, Capital North East, Smooth North East, Heart North East, Greatest Hits Radio Yorkshire Coast, This is The Coast and Coast and County Radio. Staithes is covered by the local newspapers, the Whitby Gazette and TeessideLive.

== Sport ==
Staithes Athletic Club Cricket Club ground is situated off Seaton Crescent, Staithes. The club has two senior teams: a Saturday 1st XI that compete in the Scarborough Beckett Cricket League, a Midweek Senior XI in the Esk Valley Evening League and a junior section that compete in the Derwent Valley Junior Cricket League.

== Notable people ==
- James Cook worked in Staithes as a shopkeeper's apprentice between 1745 and 1746. He was apprenticed to a local merchant and banker, William Sanderson. Sanderson's shop, where Cook lived and worked, was destroyed by the sea c.1850 but parts were recovered and incorporated into Captain Cook's Cottage on Church Street.
- The village was home to a group of around 50 artists known as the Staithes Group, or Northern Impressionists. The group was made up of painters such as Edward E. Anderson, Joseph R. Bagshawe, Thomas Barrett and James W. Booth; with Dame Laura Knight and her husband Harold Knight working in the village for many years. The group mainly painted en plein air in oils and water colours and were inspired by the French impressionists.

== See also ==
- Listed buildings in Hinderwell
- Staithe
