= John Dawnay =

John Dawnay may refer to:

- Sir John Dawnay (14th century), English soldier
- John Dawnay, 1st Viscount Downe (1625–1695), MP for Pontefract and Yorkshire
- John Dawnay (MP) (1686–1740), MP for Pontefract, grandson of the above
- John Dawnay, 4th Viscount Downe (1728–1780), MP for Cirencester and Malton, son of the above
- John Dawnay, 5th Viscount Downe (1764–1832), MP for Petersfield and Wootton Basset, son of the above
- John Dawnay, 9th Viscount Downe (1872–1931), Viscount Downe
- John Dawnay, 11th Viscount Downe (1935–2002), Viscount Downe

== See also ==
- Dawnay (surname)
