= Listed buildings in Wykeham, Scarborough =

Wykeham is a civil parish in the county of North Yorkshire, England. It contains 31 listed buildings that are recorded in the National Heritage List for England. Of these, two are listed at Grade II*, the middle of the three grades, and the others are at Grade II, the lowest grade. The parish contains the villages of Wykeham and Ruston and the surrounding area. In the parish is the country house, Wykeham Abbey, which is listed, together with associated structures. The other listed buildings include houses, farmhouses, cottages and associated structures, the remains of a priory, a church and the tower from an earlier church converted into a lychgate, a public house, a bridge, and a school.

== Key ==
Grade	Criteria
II*	Particularly important buildings of more than special interest
II	Buildings of national importance and special interest

== Buildings ==
Name and location	Photograph	Date	Notes	Grade
Priory remains 54.22392°N 0.52516°W	—	12th century	The remains of the Wykeham Priory are in sandstone, and consist of a section of the priory church north wall, about 50 metres (160 ft) in length. It contains a round-arched doorway with quoined jambs, parts of the north transept arches, and a deeply splayed window opening.	II
Churchyard cross east of Wykeham Abbey; 54.22404°N 0.52492°W	—	Medieval	The churchyard cross in the grounds to the east of the house is in limestone. It is about 1.7 metres (5 ft 7 in) in height, and one arm is missing.	II
Church Lychgate; 54.23697°N 0.52159°W		14th century	The tower of the earlier church, altered by William Butterfield in 1853–54, who added a spire, and converted it into a clock tower and lychgate. It is in sandstone, and has three stages, diagonal buttresses, string courses, and a staircase extension to the north with a slate roof. In the bottom stage is an archway with a double-chamfered surround and a pointed head, a narrow window and a clock face on the middle stage, and louvred two-light bell openings. Above is an octagonal broach spire with lucarnes and a weathervane.	II
Wykeham Abbey; 54.22397°N 0.52609°W	—	Mid-18th century	A country house which has been extended, it is in sandstone, with quoins, an eaves band and a Westmorland slate roof. The entrance front has three storeys and six bays, the middle four bays projecting under a pediment. This is flanked by two-storey two-bay wings and further two-storey three-bay ranges. Single-storey five-bay service wings project on both sides with linking bays. In the centre is a canted porch and a rusticated Doric doorcase with a pediment, and a doorway with a patterned fanlight. The windows are sashes with raised surrounds and keystones. On the front is an attached Doric colonnade with a plain parapet. The service wings have doorways with Gibbs surrounds, windows with triple keystones, and domed cupolas with weathervanes. The garden front has nine bays and a central full-height bow window.	II*
40 and 41 Wykeham Village; 54.23659°N 0.52159°W	—	1765	A pair of sandstone cottages, with rendered extensions at the rear, and a pantile roof with coped gables and kneelers. There are two storeys and four bays, and rear extensions. The entrances are in the extensions. On the front are sash windows on the ground floor, casement windows above, and all the windows have keystones. On the centre of the upper floor is an initialled datestone.	II
52 Ruston Village; 54.23518°N 0.52883°W	—	Late 18th century	The house is in sandstone with a Roman tile roof. There are two storeys and two bays, and a single-storey single-bay extension to the right. The doorway is in the extension, two of the windows are casements, and the others are sashes.	II
Abbots Meadow; 54.23260°N 0.52422°W	—	Late 18th century	The house is in sandstone on a plinth, with quoins, a stepped eaves course, and a Roman tile roof with coped gables and shaped kneelers. There are two storeys, three bays and a rear wing. The central doorway has pilasters, a divided fanlight and a cornice hood. The windows are sashes, those on the ground floor with wedge lintels, and those on the upper floor breaking the eaves.	II
West Hill and outbuilding 54.23473°N 0.52938°W	—	Late 18th century	The house and outbuilding are in sandstone with a pantile roof. The house has a stepped eaves course, two storeys, a double depth plan and a front of three bays. To the left is a single-bay extension, and further to the left is a single-storey outbuilding. The house has a central doorway with a divided fanlight, and sash windows. The extension contains a stable door and a sash window, the extension and outbuilding roofs have coped gables and shaped kneelers, and on the gable end is a datestone.	II
Ice house north of All Saints' Church; 54.23746°N 0.52118°W		c. 1800	The ice house is in orange-red brick sunk into a slope, with a retaining wall in sandstone. A short passage leads to a cylindrical interior with a domed roof.	II
The Downe Arms; 54.23681°N 0.52193°W		c. 1800	The public house is in sandstone, and has a hipped pantile roof. There are three storeys, a double depth plan, a rear wing, and a front of three bays, each bay with a full-height recessed round arch. The central doorway has a round-arched head and a radial fanlight. The windows are sashes, those in the lower two floors are tripartite and those on the top floor have segmental heads. At the rear is a radial-glazed stair window.	II
Bridge; 54.23714°N 0.52194°W	—	Early 19th century (probable)	The bridge carries Wykeham Lane over Beedale Beck. It is in sandstone, and consists of a single round arch of voussoirs. The bridge has a raised band between rusticated piers, that rise through a coped parapet, where they are panelled, and they have overhanging flat tops. At the ends are rusticated cylindrical piers with shallow domed caps.	II
Manor Farmhouse and Cottage; 54.23454°N 0.53100°W		Early 19th century	The farmhouse and attached cottage are in sandstone, with quoins on the chamfered left corner, and a pantile roof with coped gables and shaped kneelers. There are two storeys, the house on the right has three bays, the cottage has two, and at the rear are an outshut and a wing. The house has a central doorway with a divided fanlight, and above it is a coat of arms in a recessed panel. The windows are casements with painted wedge lintels. The cottage has a doorway with a divided fanlight, sash windows and heavy painted lintels. On the left gable end is a datestone.	II
Hill Farmhouse; 54.23632°N 0.52004°W	—	Early 19th century	The house, which was extended in 1851, is in sandstone, and has a pantile roof with coped gables and shaped kneelers. There are two storeys, a double depth plan three bays and a rear wing. On the front is a projecting porch, the windows are sashes, and all the openings have chiselled lintels. At the rear is an initialled datestone.	II
Gates, railings and four gate piers at the former main entrance to Wykeham Abbey; 54.23497°N 0.52703°W		Early 19th century (probable)	The gate piers are in sandstone, they have a square plan with bowed faces, and are about 3 metres (9.8 ft) in height. Each pier has banded rustication, a moulded impost band, a frieze containing rosettes in roundels, a moulded cornice, and a flat cap with festoons in relief, and is surmounted by a fluted flat urn. The gates and railings are in iron.	II
Gates, gate piers and walls at the north entrance to Wykeham Abbey; 54.22850°N 0.52513°W	—	Early 19th century (probable)	The gate piers and the attached walls at the entrance to the grounds are in sandstone. The piers are chamfered and rusticated, with a rectangular plan and bowed ends. They are about 3 metres (9.8 ft) in height, and have cornices and flat urn finials. The walls are ramped and have flat coping, and the gates are in wrought iron.	II
Gates, gate piers and walls north of Wykeham Abbey; 54.22453°N 0.52661°W	—	Early 19th century (probable)	Closing the entrance to the courtyard are sandstone walls containing wrought iron gates and sandstone gate piers. The piers have a rectangular plan and bowed ends, they are about 3 metres (9.8 ft) in height, and have cornices and flat urn finials. The walls are about 1.25 metres (4 ft 1 in) in height, and have pilaster piers with tall urn finials and flat coping.	II
Lora Terrace; 54.23514°N 0.53016°W	—	1832	A terrace of three cottages in sandstone with a pantile roof. There are two storeys and four bays, and rear outshuts. On the front are doorways and horizontally sliding sash windows, all with thin timber lintels. Over the middle door is an inscribed datestone.	II
46 Ruston Village and outbuilding 54.23452°N 0.53038°W	—	1833	The house is in sandstone with a pantile roof. There are two storeys, two bays and a single-storey outbuilding on the right. On the front is a doorway, and the windows are horizontally sliding sashes. All the openings have thin timber lintels. Above the doorway is an inscribed datestone.	II
Yew Grange and outbuilding 54.23284°N 0.52403°W	—	Early to mid-19th century	The house is in sandstone, and has a slate roof with coped gables and shaped kneelers. There are two storeys and three bays, and a single-storey three-bay range on the left. The central doorway has a blocked pattered fanlight, above it is fixed window, and the other windows are sashes. At the rear, the outbuilding opens to a cobbled yard.	II
Lora Cottages; 54.23596°N 0.52183°W	—	1844	A terrace of five cottages in sandstone with a pantile roof. There are two storeys and six bays. On the front are doorways and sash windows, and all the openings have wedge lintels. Over the middle door is an inscribed datestone.	II
63 Ruston Village and outbuilding 54.23570°N 0.53196°W	—	1846	The house is in sandstone on a plinth, and has a pantile roof. There are two storeys, two bays, and single-storey outbuildings on the left and at the rear. The central doorway has a divided fanlight, the windows are sashes, and all the openings have chiselled lintels. Above the doorway is an initialled datestone. The outbuildings have horizontally sliding sash windows and a pitching opening.	II
65 Ruston Village and outbuildings 54.23589°N 0.53190°W	—	1846	The house is in sandstone with a pantile roof. There are two storeys, two bays, and a single-storey single-bay outbuilding on the left. The central doorway has a divided fanlight, the windows are sashes, and above the doorway is an initialled datestone. The outbuilding has horizontally sliding sash windows and a pitching opening.	II
Ruston Lodge; 54.23506°N 0.53068°W	—	1847	The house is in sandstone and has a pantile roof with coped gables and shaped kneelers. There are two storeys and two bays at the front, and a later rear parallel range and a rear wing. On the front are sash windows with chiselled lintels, and a blocked doorway with an initialled datestone above. The entrance is on the right gable end of the parallel range.	II
23 and 24 Wykeham Village; 54.23458°N 0.52150°W		1849	A pair of houses in sandstone, with quoins, and a slate roof with coped gables and shaped kneelers. There are two storeys and four bays. In the centre of each house is a doorway with a divided fanlight, and the windows are sashes. On the upper floor is an initialled datestone.	II
Butterfield Cottages and outbuilding 54.23534°N 0.52893°W		c. 1850	A row of three cottages, designed by William Butterfield, in pink brick, rendered at the sides and rear, with a pantile roof. There are two storeys, each cottage has three bays, and the outbuilding to the left has a single storey. The middle bay of each cottage is gabled, that of the middle cottage full-height, and each contains a bracketed gabled porch with a tile roof. The windows are a mix of horizontally sliding sashes, casements and fixed lights. Over the ground floor windows are segmental relieving arches, and the upper floor windows have flat aches.	II
The Lodge; 54.22858°N 0.52540°W		Mid-19th century	The lodge at the north entrance to Wykeham Abbey is in sandstone on a plinth, with chamfered quoins, a moulded cornice with mutules, and a slate roof. There are two storeys and a T-shaped plan, with a front of three bays. In the centre is a full-height canted porch that has four attached dwarf Doric columns on high plinths, and an entablature. The doorway has a round head, and above it is a two-light mullioned window. Above the middle bay is a shaped and coped parapet containing a recessed circular panel with a coat of arms. On the returns are three-light bow windows and Venetian windows above.	II
Cross northeast of Wykeham Abbey; 54.22430°N 0.52500°W	—	19th century	The cross in the grounds to the northeast of the house is on the site of a previous church, it is in sandstone and about 4.5 metres (15 ft) in height. It consists of a cross and a pedestal on three steps. On the pedestal is an inscription and a moulded Celtic cross on a tall tapering shaft with flat volutes at the base.	II
All Saints' Church; 54.23718°N 0.52117°W		1853–54	The church, designed by William Butterfield in the style of the 13th century, is in sandstone with slate roofs. It consists of a nave with a clerestory, north and south aisles, a south porch, a chancel, and an organ loft and vestry. At the west end are three buttresses and two two-light windows with Y-tracery, above which is a lancet window. The east window has three lights with pointed heads and a continuous hood mould.	II*
School and school house 54.23676°N 0.52092°W		1853–54	The school and schoolhouse, later incorporated into the school, were designed by William Butterfield. They are in sandstone, with quoins, and a slate roof. The buildings form an L-shaped plan, with the former house being a rear wing. The school has a single storey with two bays, and a lower outbuilding on the right containing a pointed entrance with a quoined surround. On the right gable end is a coat of arms, and all the windows have quoined surrounds. The former house has a single storey and three bays, and sash windows.	II
North House and outbuildings 54.23774°N 0.51960°W	—	1854	A parsonage and outbuildings, designed by William Butterfield, and later used for other purposes, they are in sandstone, with some brick, quoins, and Welsh slate roofs. There are two parallel ranges. The entrance front has one storey and three bays, the middle bay projecting with two storeys, and a doorway on the left return with a chamfered surround and a half-hexagonal head. Most of the windows are sashes, and there is a mullioned and transomed stair window.	II
Gates, gate piers and walls at the west entrance to Wykeham Abbey; 54.22379°N 0.53362°W		Early 20th century (possible)	The gate piers and the attached walls at the entrance to the grounds are in sandstone. The piers are about 4 metres (13 ft) in height, with a square plan. They are chamfered and have cornices, stepped caps and ball finials. The flanking walls are ramped up, and have flat coping, and the gates are in wrought iron.	II
