= Dawnay (disambiguation) =

Dawnay is a singer.

Dawnay may also refer to:

- Dawnay baronets
- John Dawnay (disambiguation)
- Guy Dawnay (disambiguation)
- Hugh Dawnay (1932–2012), English polo player and author
- Jean Dawnay (1925–2016), British model and actress
- Dawnay Day, financial services group
