= Wykeham Abbey =

Country house in Yorkshire, England

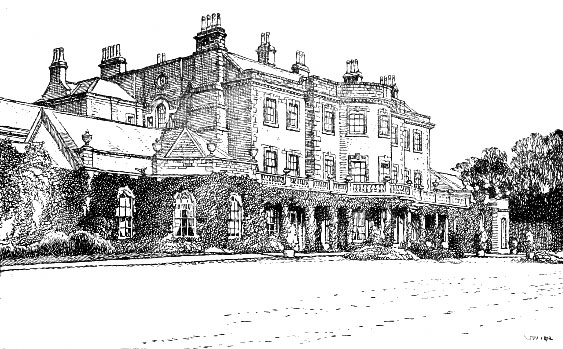
- Wykeham Abbey, sketch c. 1923

- Location within North Yorkshire

General information
- Type: Country house
- Architectural style: Georgian
- Location: Wykeham, Scarborough
- Coordinates: 54.2239°N 0.5262°W
- Client: John Dawnay, 1st Viscount Downe

Listed Building – Grade II*
- Designated: 13 December 1951
- Reference no.: 1173210

Wykeham Abbey is a Grade II* listed country house in Wykeham, North Yorkshire, England. It has been the seat of the Viscounts Downe since the early 20th century.

== History ==
Wykeham Abbey was built on the side of the former Wykeham Priory, a Cistercian nunnery established between 1140-1160. Pain de Wykeham granted his house to the priory and his son Theobald gifted the nuns 48 acres of land. King Henry III granted them an additional 103 acres.

The nunnery was destroyed by fire during the reign of Edward III (between 1312 and 1377) and rebuilt. It was dissolved in 1539 and the lands granted to Francis Poole in 1544. The only relic of the nunnery is the north wall of the priory church, which dates from the end of the 12th century.

The present house was built in the mid-18th century for Richard Hutchinson, who assumed the surname Langley after he became heir to his uncle Thomas Langley. His grandson, also Richard Langley, died childless in 1817, and bequeathed his estates to his cousin Marmaduke Dawnay, the younger son of John Dawnay, 4th Viscount Downe. In 1824, Marmaduke also assumed the surname Langley. He died in 1851, unmarried, and Wykeham Abbey has remained in the Dawnay family since.

The house was considerably expanded in the 19th century; 1835 is the year marked on a datestone and the loggia was added in 1839. There were further additions in 1904 enlarging the house.

Wykeham Abbey has been the seat of the Viscounts Downe since 1909, and the surrounding estate spreads across 2,500 acres.

Like many country houses in England, Wykeham Abbey served as a Red Cross recovery hospital in World War I. From 1914 to 1919, more than 1,520 non-commissioned officers and soldiers from across the British Isles passed through the doors.

== Listed buildings ==
The main house is Grade II* listed. Several other buildings surrounding the main house are Grade II listed:

- Outbuildings and stables, designed in 1854 by William Butterfield
- Gates, railings and gate piers, dated early 19th century
- Medieval churchyard cross, approximately 35 metres east of the main house
- 12th-century priory remains consisting of a section of north wall, approximately 50 metres long, 10 metres east of the main house
