= Henry Dawnay =

Henry Dawnay may refer to:

- Henry Dawnay, 3rd Viscount Downe (1727–1760), British soldier and politician
- Henry Dawnay, 2nd Viscount Downe (1664–1741), English politician
