= White Rose Way (walking trail) =

Long-distance footpath in England

Coordinates: 53.7963°N 1.5475°W

The White Rose Way
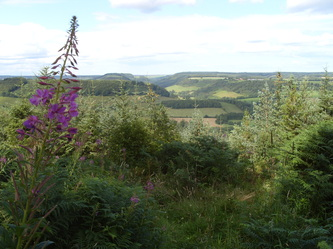
- View at Langdale End
- Length: 104 miles (167 km)
- Location: West Yorkshire, East Riding of Yorkshire, North Yorkshire, England
- Designation: Long Distance Footpath
- Trailheads: Leeds, Scarborough
- Use: Hiking
- Highest point: 755 ft (230 m)
- Lowest point: Sea level
- Difficulty: Moderate

The White Rose Way is a 104 miles (167 km) walking trail in England from Leeds, West Yorkshire to Scarborough, North Yorkshire. It was created in 2011 by local author Paul Brown. The walk starts at the foot of the Black Prince Statue in City Square with the finish line being at the former harbour-side Tourist Information Centre in the South Bay, Scarborough (now Esposito's Ice Cream next to Ask Restaurant).

The walk links existing trails with little used footpaths, passing through suburbs of Leeds to quickly enter linked park land and into the grounds of Harewood House. The Wharfe Valley follows, leading to the market town of Wetherby, and on to the agricultural plains of the Vale of York via Boston Spa and Tadcaster. The walk passes through Fulford and Kexby and up the River Derwent into Stamford Bridge. The Derwent Valley is followed in to Malton and Thornton le Dale. The North York Moors National Park is traversed through Wykeham Forest and Dalby Forest to the hamlet of Harwood Dale. The walk pushes on to Cloughton before following the Cleveland Way for the last few miles in to Scarborough.

The guide to the walk (The White Rose Way by Paul Brown) was published in 2012 by Hazelbury Publishing (ISBN 978-0957113404).

== See also ==
- Way of the Roses (cycling route)
