= Robert Monckton (disambiguation) =

Robert Monckton (1726–1782) was a British Army officer.

Robert Monckton may also refer to:

- Robert Monckton (died 1722) (1650s–1722), English Member of Parliament

== See also ==
- Robert Monckton-Arundell, 4th Viscount Galway (1752–1810), British politician
