= Langdale Forest =

Forest in North Yorkshire, England

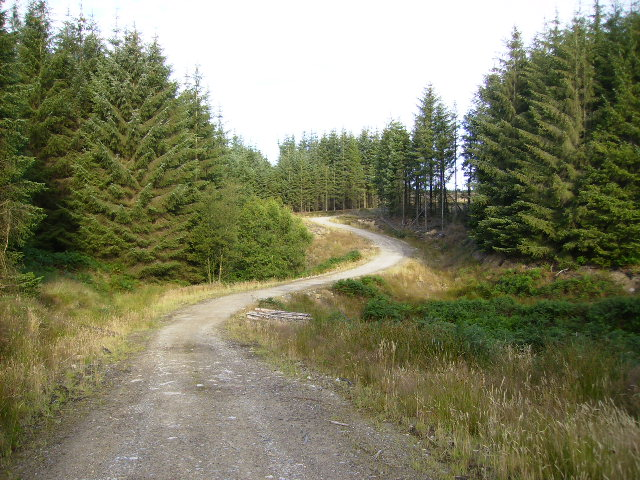
- Forestry road in Langdale Forest

- Location within North Yorkshire
- Interactive map of Langdale Forest

Geography
- Location: North Yorkshire, Yorkshire and the Humber, England
- Coordinates: 54.3419°N 0.6157°W
- Elevation: 61–290 metres (200–950 ft) (range); 224.3 metres (736 ft) (average)
- Area – maximum: 2,993.8 hectares (7,398 acres) in 2022

Administration
- Status: Forestry England
- Established: 1934

Langdale Forest is an area of primarily coniferous woodland at the southern end of the North York Moors National Park, in North Yorkshire, England. The forest covers an area of 2,993.8 hectares (7,398 acres) and includes May Moss, a peatland that is recognised by the IUCN. Some areas of coniferous plantations within the forest that have been felled in the 21st century, have been replaced with broad-leaved trees. Alongside neighbouring Dalby Forest, and nearby Cropton Forest, Langdale Forest forms part of the North Riding Forest Park.

== History ==
The forest lies 14 kilometres (8.7 mi) north-west of Scarborough, and 16 kilometres (9.9 mi) north-east of Pickering, located within the North York Moors National Park in North Yorkshire, England. In 2021, it consisted of 64% coniferous tree cover, 7% broad-leaf cover, 25% open land or scrubland, and the remaining 4% was land cover with felled trees. The forest is so named after the nearby village of Langdale End, and one of the prominent features of the forest, Langdale Rigg. Langdale itself is recorded as a name as far back as 1335, and means Long Valley. The land for the forest was acquired in 1934, and 1938, with the portion on the east bank of the River Derwent first, and the area on the west bank side around Broxa, second. The geology of the area is sandstone of the Osgodby Formation which is overlain with clay and sand.

Prior to the establishment of the forest, the land had been used for sheep-grazing and as a military training area (large parts of which also became the RAF Fylingdales base in 1963). The only wooded areas were the steep sides of the gorge on either side of the River Derwent, which also forms the northern boundary of the forest on its western side. The average height range of the forest cover is 224.3 metres (736 ft), with the lowest point being the River Derwent gorge (61 metres (200 ft)), to the highest at High Wood Howe, which is 290 metres (950 ft). Several streams within the forest are tributaries of the River Derwent.

Langdale forms part of the North Riding Forest Park, which also includes the adjacent Dalby Forest (to the south-west) and nearby Cropton Forest. All of these forests have suffered from illegal off-roading activities in the 21st century.

=== May Moss ===
May Moss is a peatland on the north-western edge of Langdale Forest that borders RAF Fylingdales to the north. The bog is believed to be 9,000 years old, and was included as part of the forest as spruce trees were planted there. The bog covers an area of 150 hectares (370 acres), and in 2012, over 170,000 trees were removed from the bog area to prevent May Moss drying out as the trees root zones were taking the water. The bog acts as a sponge during cloudbursts, preventing excess flooding on the River Derwent. The peat restoration project included many partners and the site is registered as part of the peatland programme with the International Union for Conservation of Nature.

== Scheduled monuments ==
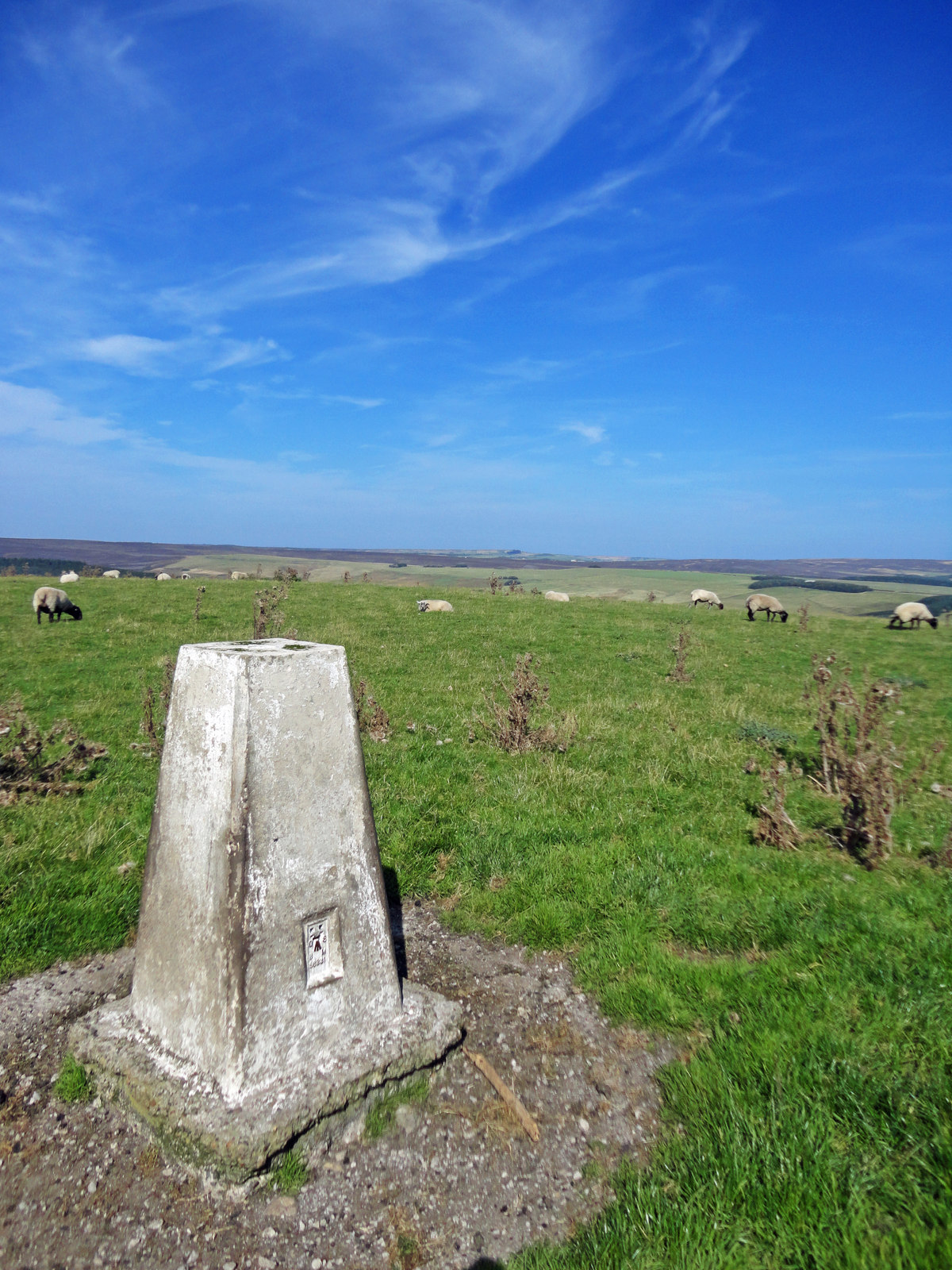
Langdale Rigg End Trig Point

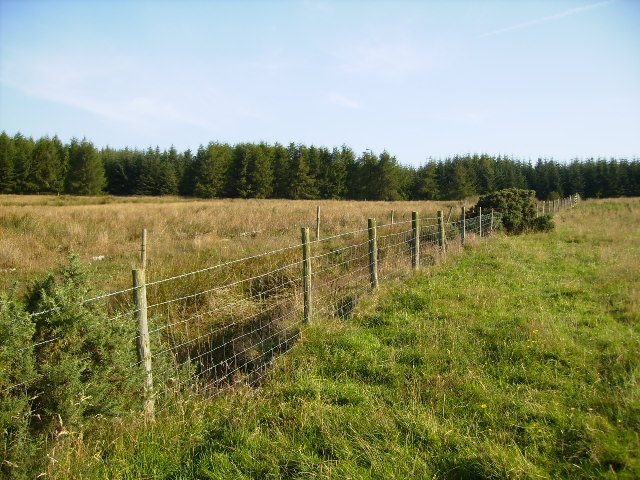
Uncultivated area near the edge of Langdale Forest

The forest contains over 15 scheduled monuments, all listed with Historic England, being noted for their history dating back to the Bronze Age.

Scheduled monuments within Langdale Forest
| Name | Ref |
|---|---|
| Round barrow 610m south west of High Langdale End | |
| Round barrow 430m SSW of High Langdale End | |
| Round barrow 330m south west of High Langdale End | |
| Round barrow 280m south west of High Langdale End | |
| Round barrow 450m west of High Langdale End | |
| Round barrow on Maw Rigg, 1.6km south west of High Langdale End | |
| Round barrow on Maw Rigg, 1.5km south west of High Langdale End | |
| Round barrow 490m south west of High Langdale End | |
| Maw Rigg cairnfield in Langdale Forest | |
| Round barrow on Derwent Head Rigg, 145m east of High Woof Howe | |
| Round barrow on Derwent Head Rigg, 200m east of High Woof Howe | |
| Brecken Howe round barrow | |
| Round barrow on Lun Rigg, 890m east of Brecken Howe | |
| Low Woof Howe round barrow | |
| High Woof Howe round barrow at Derwent Head Rigg | |
| Round cairn cemetery at High Greens 460m south east of Brecken Howe | |

== Recreation ==
In 1993, the Forestry Commission opened up over 30 miles (48 km) of mountain bike trails within the forest. During the 1980s, Langdale and Wykeham Forest were used as part of a rallying course, with Finnish driver Hannu Mikkola crashing in Langdale Forest.

== Wildlife ==
In 2012, £24,000 was spent on ecological improvements to the becks in the forest to provide a stable habitat for water voles. Some conifers were felled and scrub was cleared to allow "suitable vegetation" to grow that the water voles favour. Nightjars have established what has been described as a "Northern stronghold" in the forest, with over 70 males recorded in 2011. The bog area at May Moss is known to be host to common lizards and adders. Like other nearby forests, Langdale has a population of red and roe deer.
