= William Lowther (died 1688) =

English landowner and politician

Sir William Lowther (c. 1612 – February 1688) was an English landowner and politician who sat in the House of Commons from 1660 to 1679.

== Life ==
Lowther was the son of Sir John Lowther of Lowther Hall and his wife Eleanor Fleming, daughter of Wiliam Fleming of Rydal. In 1660, he was elected member of parliament for Pontefract in the Convention Parliament He was re-elected MP for Pontefract in 1661 for the Cavalier Parliament. He was knighted on 30 December 1661 and was dwelling at Swillington.

== Family ==
Lowther married Jane Busfield daughter of William Busfield, merchant of Leeds, Yorkshire, by 1636. They had five sons and nine daughters, the eldest son being Sir William Lowther. Daughter Jane married Sir Francis Bland, 2nd Baronet

He was also the brother of Sir John Lowther, 1st Baronet.

Parliament of England
| Preceded by William White | Member of Parliament for Pontefract; 1660–1679; With: Sir George Savile, Bt 1660–1661; Sir John Dawnay 1661–1679 | Succeeded by Sir John Dawnay; Sir Patience Ward |
