= Wykeham Priory =

Nunnery in Wykeham, North Yorkshire, England

- Location within North Yorkshire
- Interactive map of Wykeham Priory

Monastery information
- Established: between 1140 and 1160
- Disestablished: 14th century (destroyed by fire during the reign of Edward III)

Site
- Location: Wykeham, North Yorkshire, England
- Country: England
- Coordinates: 54.224670°N 0.519531°W

Wykeham Priory was a nunnery in Wykeham, North Yorkshire, England. It was established between 1140 and 1160 and was destroyed by fire during the reign of Edward III.

In the mid-18th century, Wykeham Abbey was built on the site of the former priory.
