= Viscount Downe =

Title in the peerage of Ireland

- Argent on a bendlet cotised sable three annulets of the field
- Creation date: 19 July 1675 (first creation); 19 February 1680 (second creation)
- Created by: Charles II
- Peerage: Peerage of Ireland
- First holder: William Ducie (first creation); John Dawnay (second creation)
- Present holder: Richard Henry Dawnay, 12th Viscount Downe
- Heir presumptive: Thomas Payan Dawnay
- Subsidiary titles: Baron Dawnay
- Seat: Wykeham Abbey
- Former seats: Cowick Hall, Dawnay Lodge, Danby Castle
- Motto: Timet pudorem "He fears shame")

Heraldic achievement of the Viscounts Downe
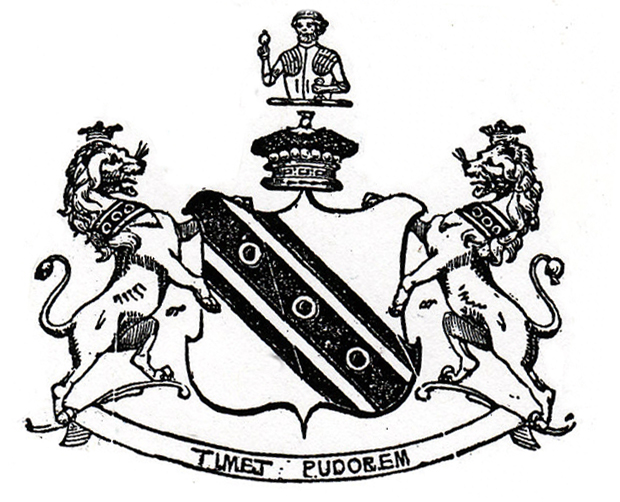
- Crest: A demi Saracen in armour, couped at the thighs and wreathed about the temples ppr. holding in the dexter hand a ring gold, stoned az. and in the sinister a lion's gamb erased or, armed ge.
- Shield: Argent on a bendlet cotised sable three annulets of the field
- Supporters: Two lions or, gorged with a fesse cotised ea. charged with three annulets ar. ducally crowned of the last
- Motto: Timet pudorem ("He fears shame")

Viscount Downe is a title that has been created twice in the Peerage of Ireland. The first creation came in 1675 for William Ducie. However, the title became extinct on his death in 1679. The second creation came in 1680 for John Dawnay. He had earlier represented Yorkshire and Pontefract in the English House of Commons. His son, the second Viscount, also represented these constituencies in the House of Commons. His grandson, the third Viscount, sat as a member of parliament for Yorkshire but died from wounds received at the Battle of Campen in 1760. He was succeeded by his younger brother, the fourth Viscount, who represented Cirencester and Malton in Parliament.

His son, the fifth Viscount, sat as a member of parliament for Petersfield and Wootton Bassett. In 1797, he was created Baron Dawnay, of Cowick in the County of York, in the Peerage of Great Britain. However, this title became extinct on his death while he was succeeded in the viscountcy by his younger brother, the sixth Viscount. His son, the seventh Viscount, was a member of parliament for Rutland. His son, the eighth Viscount, was a Major-General in the Army and served in the Anglo-Zulu War of 1879 and in the Second Boer War. In 1897, he was created Baron Dawnay, of Danby in the North Riding of the County of York, in the Peerage of the United Kingdom. This peerage gave him and his descendants an automatic seat in the House of Lords until the passing of the House of Lords Act 1999. As of 2015, the titles are held by his great-great-grandson, the twelfth Viscount, who succeeded his father in 2002.

The Hon. Guy Dawnay, fourth son of the seventh Viscount, was a soldier and Conservative politician.

The first Viscount of the second creation was the brother of Sir Christopher Dawnay, 1st Baronet, of Cowick, a title which became extinct in 1644 (see Dawnay baronets, of Cowick).

The family seat is Wykeham Abbey, near Scarborough, North Yorkshire.

== Viscounts Downe, First Creation (1675) ==
- William Ducie, 1st Viscount Downe (c. 1612 – 1679)

== Viscounts Downe, Second Creation (1680) ==
- John Dawnay, 1st Viscount Downe (1625–1695)
- Henry Dawnay, 2nd Viscount Downe (1664–1741)

- The Honourable John Dawnay (1686–1740)

- Henry Pleydell Dawnay, 3rd Viscount Downe (1727–1760)
- John Dawnay, 4th Viscount Downe (1728–1780)
- John Christopher Burton Dawnay, 5th Viscount Downe (1764–1832)
- William Henry Dawnay, 6th Viscount Downe (1772–1846)
- William Henry Dawnay, 7th Viscount Downe (1812–1857)
- Hugh Richard Dawnay, 8th Viscount Downe (1844–1924)
- John Dawnay, 9th Viscount Downe (1872–1931), Captain in the 10th Hussars, fought in Boer War, where he was mentioned in despatches and awarded DSO and later gained rank of Major in Norfolk Yeomanry. Succeeded as 9th Viscount on 21 January 1924.
- Richard Dawnay, 10th Viscount Downe (1903–1965), educated at Eton, Page of Honour to George V between 1917 and 1919; gained rank of Colonel in the Green Howards. Succeeded as 10th Viscount on 1 December 1931.
- John Christian George Dawnay, 11th Viscount Downe (1935–2002), educated at Eton; following national service in the Grenadier Guards, Christ Church, Oxford, Deputy lieutenant of North Yorkshire in 1982. Succeeded as 11th Viscount on 8 December 1965.
- Richard Henry Dawnay, 12th Viscount Downe (born 1967), educated at Eton and Durham University, where he completed a Bachelor of Science degree. An accountant by profession, formerly with HSBC. Succeeded as 12th Viscount on 15 March 2002.

The heir presumptive is the present holder's cousin Thomas Payan Dawnay (born 24 July 1978).
