= William Lowther (1639–1705) =

English landowner and politician (1639–1705)

Sir William Lowther (18 August 1639 – 7 December 1705) was an English landowner and MP.

He was the eldest son of Sir William Lowther of Swillington, near Leeds and educated at Gray's Inn and Balliol College, Oxford. He succeeded his father in 1688 and was knighted the same year.

He was appointed High Sheriff of Yorkshire for 1681. He was commissioner for the Aire and Calder Navigation in 1699 and elected member of parliament for Pontefract in 1695, sitting until 1698.

He died at Little Preston Hall near Leeds in 1705 and was buried at Kippax. He had married Catherine, the daughter of Thomas Harrison of Middlesex, and had ten children, the eldest being Sir William Lowther, 1st Baronet. He had a falling-out with his eldest son, William, over his marriage to the daughter of Lord Maynard, because of the reduction in the estates that would be entailed by her jointure. He left the majority of his estate to Christopher, his younger son.

Parliament of England
Preceded by Hon. Henry Dawnay; Sir John Bland, Bt	Member of Parliament for Pontefract; 1695–1698; With: Robert Monckton	Succeeded by Sir John Bland, Bt; John Bright
Honorary titles
Preceded by Sir Richard Graham, Bt	High Sheriff of Yorkshire; 1681	Succeeded by Ambrose Pudsey
