= Dalby Forest =

Forest in North Yorkshire, England

Coordinates: 54.278°N 0.654°W

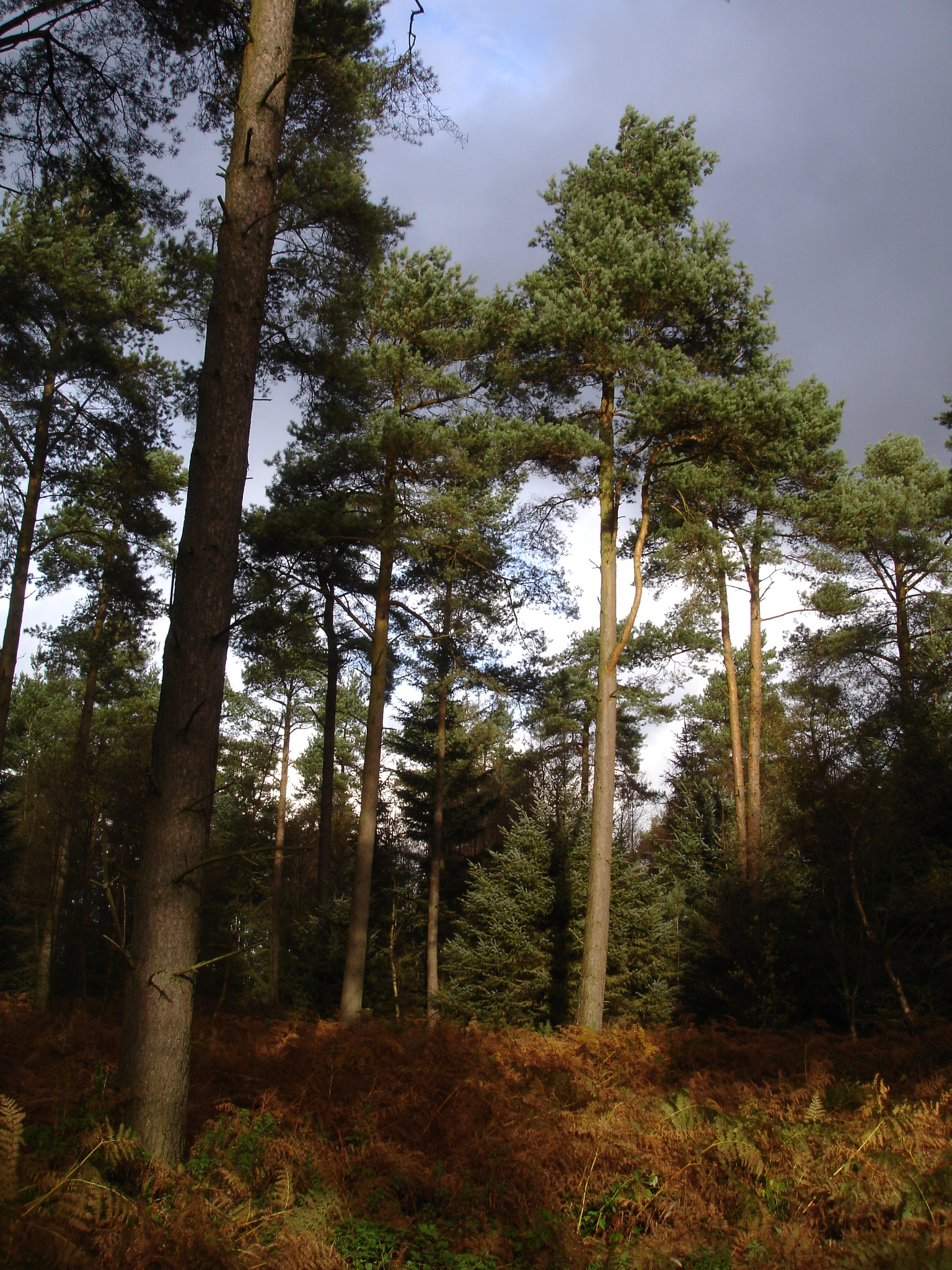
A stand of Scots pine in Dalby Forest

Dalby Forest is a forest located on the southern slopes of the North York Moors in North Yorkshire, England. It is maintained by Forestry England. Dalby Forest, along with Langdale Forest and Cropton Forest, forms part of the North Riding Forest Park, found within the North York Moors National Park.

== Flora and fauna ==
Dalby Forest is home to many species of wildlife such as badgers, roe deer and nightjars, as well as five species of bat. There are also many species of trees including oak, beech, ash, alder and hazel. Sitka spruce is the prevalent tree species accounting for 30% of all trees in the forest. It is also home to narrow leaved marsh orchids, yellow bird's-nest and violet crown cup.

There are four Sites of Special Scientific Interest (SSSI) within the forest at Ellerburn Bank, Ellers Wood & Sand Dale, Seive Dale Fen and Troutsdale & Rosekirk Dale Fens.

== Geology ==
The area now covered by the forest was under water 150 million years ago. Fossils from this era can be found across the entire area. The predominant soil type on the moorland and spurs is Middle calcareous grit, or sandstone. Elsewhere, Hambleton Oolite Limestone and Yedmandale Limestone, as well as sandstone, can be found. On the valley floor is Oxford Clay Formation, also known as mudstone. There are also some peat bogs. The forest is situated on a rising landscape from a low point of 60m in Thornton Dale to a high point of 248m. There are four main water valleys of Thornton Dale, Trouts Dale, Stain Dale and Deep Dale. The dales of Dalby Forest were the result of melt water from glacial ice fields during the Devensian period.

== History ==
There is evidence of people living in Dalby Forest since the Bronze Age. Burial mounds, linear earthworks of unknown purpose and the remains of a flourishing rabbit warren industry have also been found throughout the woods. In all there are 83 scheduled and over 600 unscheduled monuments within the area.

It was once the Royal Hunting Forest of Pickering. The Forestry Commission purchased land around Low and High Dalby in 1919 from the Duchy of Lancaster Estate. They began planting trees in 1921.

During the 1930s, unemployed men were set to work in Dalby Forest, breaking ground, building tracks and undertaking other heavy labour. The men lived in a work camp at Low Dalby, which was one of a number of so-called Instructional Centres run by the Ministry of Labour in order to 'harden' young men who had been out of work for some time. By 1938, the Ministry was operating 35 Instructional Centres across Britain with a total capacity of over 6,000 places.

By 1939, unemployment was declining in the face of impending war and the Ministry closed down its work camps. However, much of Dalby village seems to be based partly on the layout of the old Instructional Centre.

In 1982, Barry Prudom sought refuge from a police manhunt in Dalby Forest. Prudom who was wanted for several murders holed up in Malton near the police station and when cornered, he committed suicide.

== Recreation ==
Today, Dalby Forest is used for recreation as well as timber production. There are several car parks, hiking trails and mountain bike trails, a 'forest drive' throughout the forest and a Go Ape centre. A toll is charged to enter either end of the forest drive by car. There is no further charge for parking at the car parks along the route. The main visitor centre has a café and shop, which is adjacent to a selection of other businesses including a bike shop and various craft workshops. A free, weekly, timed 5k parkrun takes place at 9am every Saturday starting near The Courtyard, Low Dalby.

Mountain bike trails correspond to the standard IMBA and Forestry England grading scheme. Some start from the main visitor centre, others from Dixons Hollow, an area a little further along the forest drive. They include:

- Two green trails, one starting from the visitor centre and one from Dixons Hollow. The green trails follow forestry roads for the duration of the trail, and as suggested by the IMBA, require a minimal amount of fitness and are suitable for families.
- A blue trail starting from the visitor centre.
- A red trail starting from Dixons Hollow. This is the longest trail and explores much of the forest. It passes near the visitor centre and can be accessed from it. The red trail is technical in places and requires a high level of fitness and technical proficiency. A hardtail mountain bike of a moderate spec is advised to tackle this trail.
- A black trail starting from Dixons Hollow. The black trail is highly technical with some extremely severe descents requiring a very high level of skill and fitness. On the newer sections of the trail there are a number of blind 3–5 ft drops which can cause serious injury if approached unaware, or at a high speed.
- A "slope-style" area at Dixons Hollow, including jumps, a corkscrew, northshore and skinnies. This has been sponsored by Pace Cycles and constructed in association with SingletrAction.

The more challenging trails deliberately start from Dixons Hollow, a little remote from the main visitor centre, to discourage inexperienced mountain bikers.

In 2010 and 2011 the forest hosted a round of the cross-country section of the UCI Mountain Bike World Cup. A climb through the forest featured on the first stage of the 2015 Tour de Yorkshire.

The route of the White Rose Way, a long distance walk from Leeds to Scarborough, passes through the forest.

The Dark-sky preserve aspect of Dalby ensures its place as an optimal venue for local and national astronomical societies.

Dalby has long been a popular venue for rallying. Its forest tracks, noted for their long straights and difficult bends, for many years formed one of the most daunting stages on Britain's round of the World Rally Championship, the RAC Rally. It is also part of the Forest Live music network, and hosts a number of concerts per year from artists of a great variety of genres. Performers include:

- Embrace (25 June 2006)
- Morning Runner (25 June 2006)
- James Morrison (2007)
- McFly (26 June 2009)
- Will Young (June 2012)
- Kaiser Chiefs (2016)

The Kaiser Chiefs were due to play at the venue in the summer of 2020, but had to cancel due to the COVID-19 pandemic. Will Young and James Morrison were also due to play that year as part of the Forest Live 2020 concert series.

== Long term plan ==
Forestry England, who maintain and conserve the forest and its facilities, have a long term plan for sustainability. It includes:

- Conservation of ancient trees and restoration of native woodland and plants.
- Maintaining the character of the woodlands through structural and species diversity.
- Maintaining a sustainable timber supply through diversification of types of tree felled.
- Providing recreational opportunities aligned with the sustainability goals.
- Protecting those scheduled and unscheduled features within the forest.
