= William Jessop (died 1734) =

English lawyer and Whig politician

William Jessop (c. 1665–1734) of Broom Hall, Sheffield, Yorkshire, was an English lawyer, and Whig politician who sat in the English and British House of Commons for 32 years between 1702 and 1734. He was a judge on the Anglesey and Chester circuits.

== Early life ==
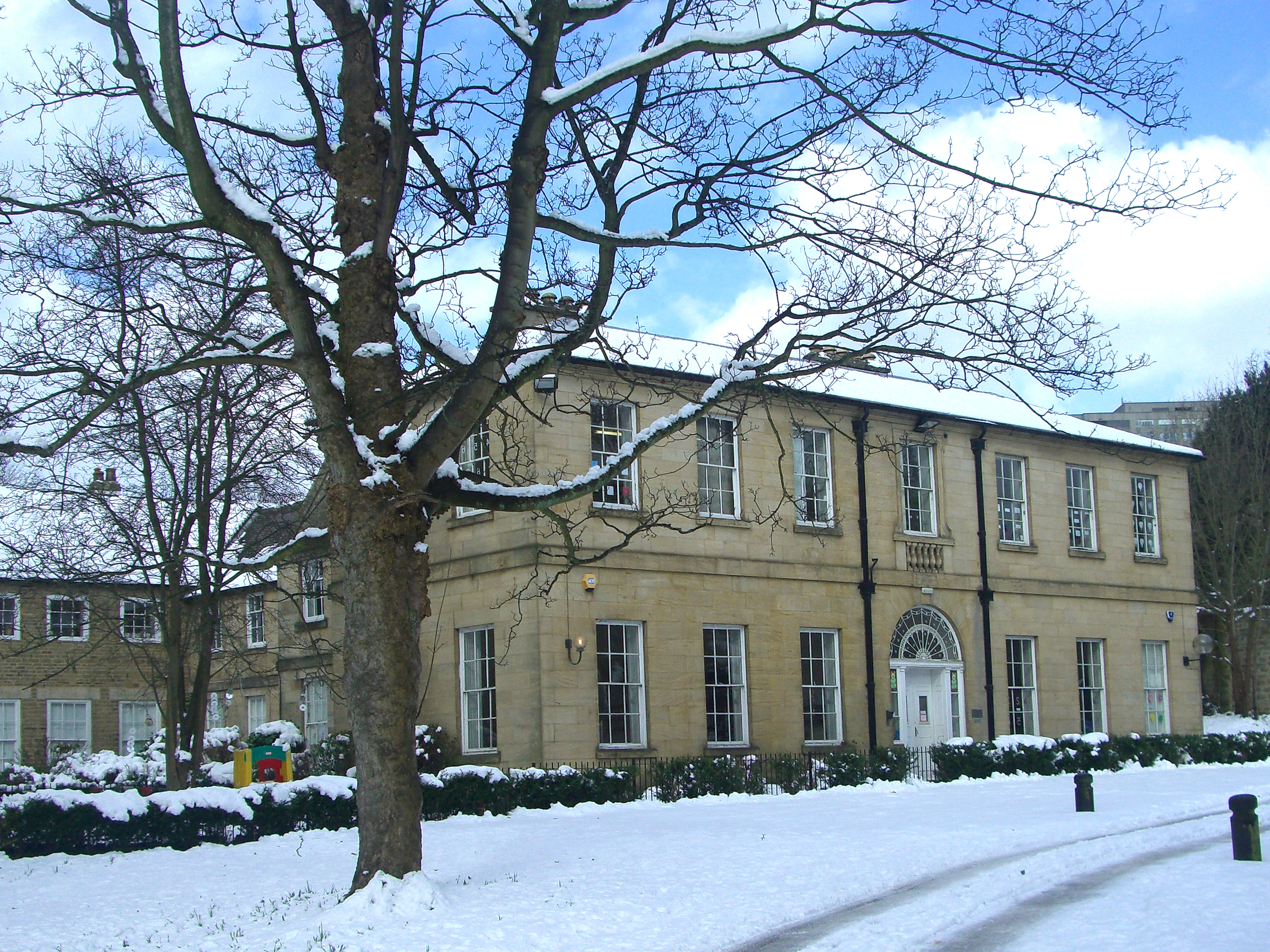
Broom Hall, Sheffield

Jessop was the fifth son of Francis Jessop, of Broomhall, Yorkshire and his wife Barbara Eyre, daughter of Robert Eyre of Highlow, Derbyshire. He was admitted at Gray's Inn in 1683 and was called to the bar in 1690. In 1691 he succeeded his father to Broom Hall. He married by licence dated 15 January 1697, Mary Darcy, daughter of James Darcy.

== Career ==
Jessop was legal adviser to John Holles, 1st Duke of Newcastle, on whose recommendation he first stood unsuccessfully for election at Aldborough in 1701. He was returned unopposed as Member of Parliament for Aldborough at the 1702 general election and again in 1705. In 1707, he was appointed a Justice of the Anglesey circuit. He was returned unopposed for Aldborough as a Whig in the 1708 general election. On 14 January 1709, he fought a duel in Hyde Park with William Levinz an opponent of the Duke, and was ‘run into the belly, but not dangerous’. He was returned unopposed as MP for Aldborough at the 1710 general election. After the Duke of Newcastle died in 1711, his widow disputed the will which left his estates to his nephew, Thomas Pelham-Holles, 1st Duke of Newcastle. Jessop sided with Pelham and stood as a Whig on Pelham's interest for Aldborough in 1713 but was defeated by the Duchess.

At the 1715 British general election, Jessop regained his seat at Aldborough, after Pelham's dispute with the Duchess of Newcastle had been determined in Pelham's favour. He was a consistent supporter of the Administration. Also in 1715 he was promoted to chief justice of the Anglesey circuit, and became a bencher of his Inn. In 1717, he was appointed Commissioner and Receiver of the Alienation Office and was re-elected at the resulting by-election on 24 July 1717. He held the post for the rest of his life. In 1721 during the debates on the directors of the South Sea Company, he was mentioned as having lost money in another fraudulent company of one of the Directors, and spoke strongly against letting the directors keep a percentage of their estates in return for prompt payment. He was returned unopposed for Aldborough in 1722 and in 1727. In 1729, he was appointed a Puisne Justice of Chester and was re-elected in consequent by-election on 3 March 1729. He then remained in office until his death. He was returned attain for Aldborough As a placeman he always voted with the Government, except in 1732 on the army issue. He was returned for the last time at the 1734 general election.

== Death and legacy ==
Jessop died on 8 November 1734. He had a son and four daughters. His son James inherited the title Baron Darcy of Navan from his maternal grandfather but predeceased his father without issue in 1733. Jessop's daughter Barbara married Andrew Wilkinson, who succeeded to his seat in Parliament.

Parliament of England
Preceded by Robert Monckton; Cyril Arthington	Member of Parliament for Aldborough; 1702–1708; With: Robert Monckton	Succeeded by Parliament of Great Britain
Parliament of Great Britain
Preceded by Parliament of England	Member of Parliament for Aldborough; 1708–1713; With: Robert Monckton	Succeeded by John Dawnay; Paul Foley
Preceded by John Dawnay; Paul Foley	Member of Parliament for Aldborough; 1715–1734; With: James Stanhope 1715; William Monson 1715-1722; Charles Stanhope 1722 -1734; Henry Pelham 1734	Succeeded by John Jewkes; Andrew Wilkinson
