= William Dawnay, 6th Viscount Downe =

English clergyman and Irish peer

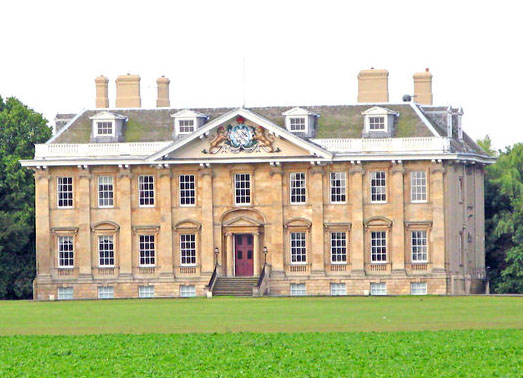
Cowick Hall in the East Riding of Yorkshire, seat of the Viscounts Downe

William Henry Dawnay, 6th Viscount Downe (20 August 1772 – 23 May 1846), styled The Honourable William Henry Dawnay until 1832, was an English clergyman and Irish peer.

William was the second son of John Dawnay, 4th Viscount Downe. Educated at Eton, he became friends there with the son of Giles Earle (d. 1811). He matriculated at Christ Church, Oxford in 1790, receiving his BA in 1795 and his MA in 1796.

In 1798, his brother John Dawnay, 5th Viscount Downe presented William to the rectories of Sessay and Thormanby. Both of these livings are in North Yorkshire, and were in the patronage of the Dawnays, as was Ashwell, Rutland, to which he was presented by his brother in 1803.

On 6 June 1811, William married Lydia Heathcote daughter of John Heathcote of Connington Castle, by whom he had three children:

- William Dawnay, 7th Viscount Downe (1812–1857)
- Hon. Lydia Frances Catherine Dawnay (2 October 1813 – 28 January 1890)
- Hon. Payan Dawnay (18 November 1815 – 17 June 1891)

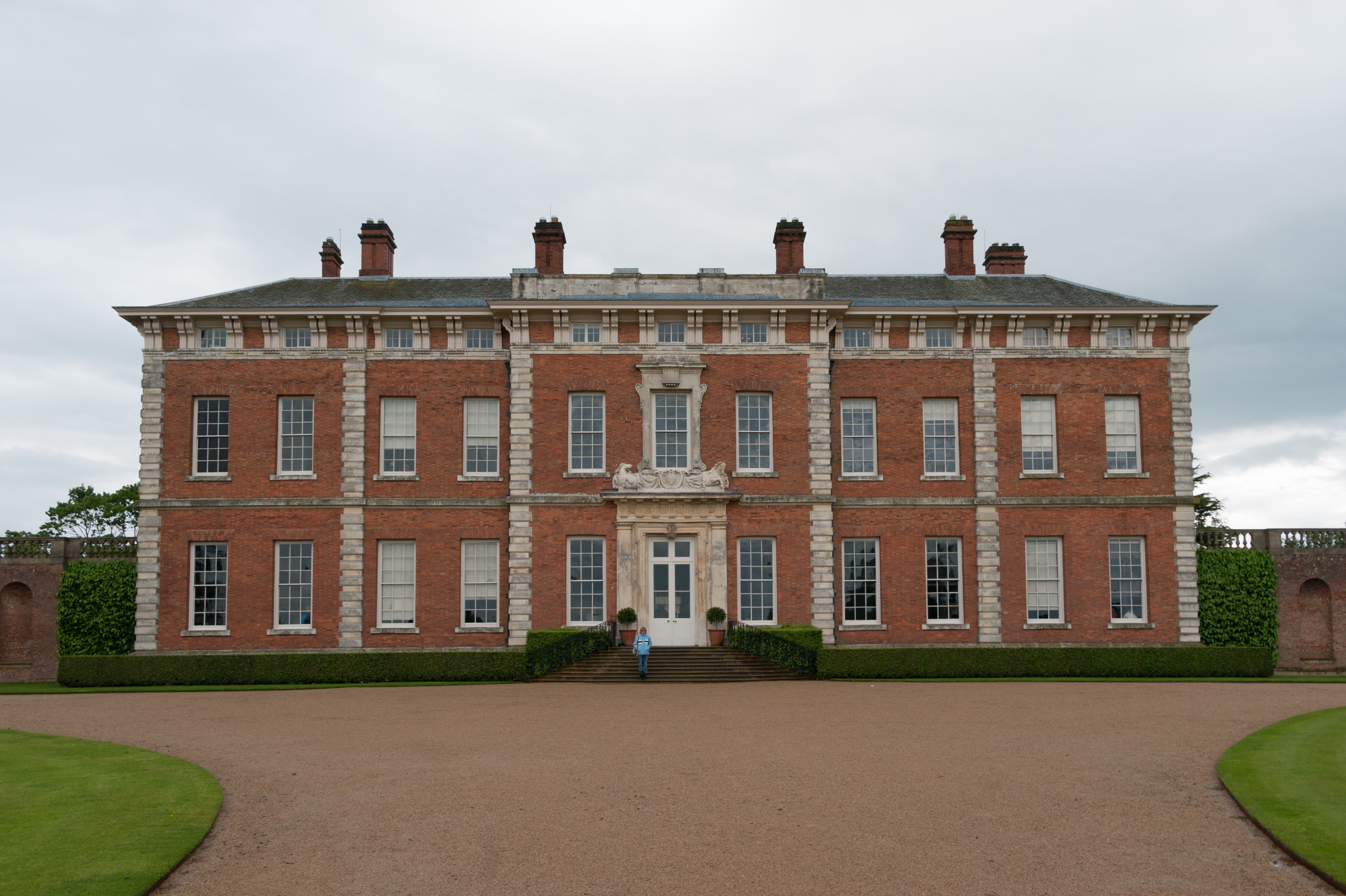
Beningbrough Hall, Yorkshire

Dawnay inherited Beningbrough Hall, Yorkshire, in 1827, upon the death of Margaret Earle, mother of his school friend at Eton. Her sons predeceased her, and as she was the last of the Bourchier family that had owned Beningbrough, she left it to him. He succeeded his brother as Viscount Downe in 1832. Downe died at Torquay in 1846 and was succeeded by his eldest son William Henry. Beningbrough, however, was left to Downe's second son, Payan.

Peerage of Ireland
Preceded by John Dawnay	Viscount Downe; 1832–1846	Succeeded by William Dawnay
