= All Saints' Church, Wykeham =

Church in North Yorkshire, England

Coordinates: 54.2371°N 0.5211°W

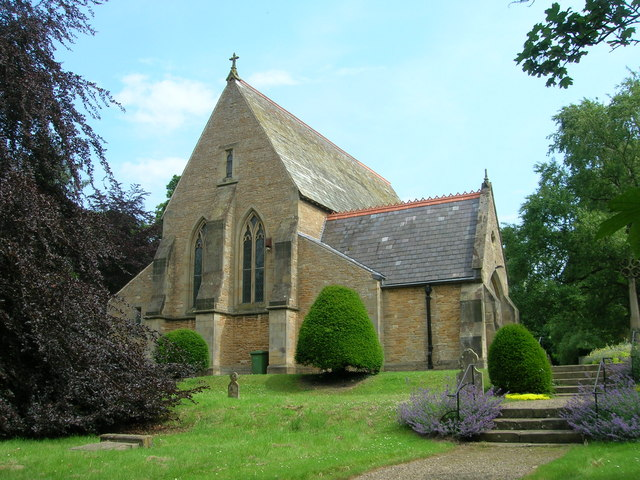
The church, in 2009

All Saints' Church is the parish church of Wykeham, a village near Scarborough, North Yorkshire, a town in England.

A chapel was built in Wykeham in 1321 by John de Wykeham, and dedicated to Saint Helen. The building fell into ruin, although the tower remained standing. A new church was built immediately to the north between 1853 and 1855, to a design by William Butterfield. Once the church was complete, he restored the tower of the old church, adding a spire, and altering it to serve as a lychgate for the new building. The church was grade II* listed in 1967, while the lychgate is grade II listed.

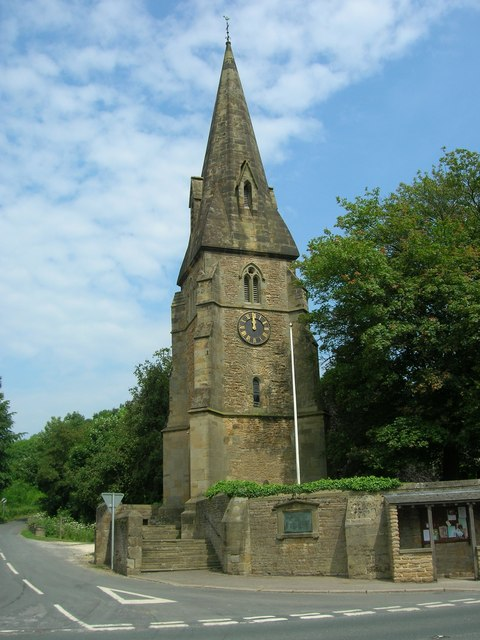
The lychgate

The church is built of sandstone with slate roofs. It consists of a nave with a clerestory, north and south aisles, a south porch, a chancel, and an organ loft and vestry. At the west end are three buttresses and two two-light windows with Y-tracery, above which is a lancet window. The east window has three lights with pointed heads and a continuous hood mould. Inside, the pulpit, font and altar candlesticks were all designed by Butterfield, while the choir stalls, altar rails, litany desk and candelabra were designed in 1937 by Robert Thompson. The east window has stained glass by William Wailes.

The lychgate is built of sandstone, and has three stages, diagonal buttresses, string courses, and a staircase extension to the north with a slate roof. In the bottom stage is an archway with a double-chamfered surround and a pointed head, a narrow window and a clock face on the middle stage, and louvred two-light bell openings. Above is an octagonal broach spire with lucarnes and a weathervane.

== See also ==
- Grade II* listed churches in North Yorkshire (district)
- Listed buildings in Wykeham, Scarborough
