= Wykeham Forest =

Forest in North Yorkshire, England

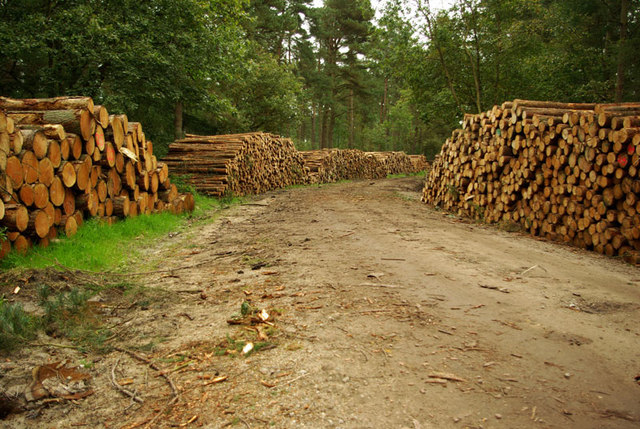
- Logging in Wykeham Forest

- Location within North Yorkshire
- Interactive map of Wykeham Forest

Geography
- Location: North Yorkshire, England
- Coordinates: 54.283°N 0.544°W
- Elevation: 660 feet (200 m)
- Area – maximum: 2,760 acres (1,115 hectares); 3,800 acres (1,500 ha) in 1951

Administration
- Established: 1924 – 1987
- Authority: Forestry Commission

Wykeham Forest is a 2,760-acre (1,115-hectare) woodland 6 miles (9.7 km) in the North York Moors National Park, near to Wykeham, west of Scarborough, England. The wood is a mixture of conifer and broadleaf trees, with some open ground and a Forestry Commission nursery. The wood was planted in stages between 1924 and 1987, with open land being purchased by the commission. Recreational activities such as walking, cycling and horse-riding are undertaken in the forest.

== History ==
Wykeham Forest is located on the Tabular Hills, some 6 miles (9.7 km) west of Scarborough, in North Yorkshire. The forest was developed from the 1920s onwards, as part of the Allerston Forest programme, which included Dalby Forest, Bickley Forest and Staindale Forest. The all-encompassing name of Allerston Forest was decided upon as when it was first surveyed, the works party stayed in the village of Allerston. At its peak in 1951, the forest at Wykeham covered 3,800 acres (1,500 ha), but by 2017, this had been reduced to 2,760 acres (1,115 hectares). The land ranges from 500 feet (150 m) to 800 feet (240 m) above sea level, with an average of 660 feet (200 m). In 2016, conifer coverage within the forest was 764 acres (309 ha), which is expected to fall to 714 acres (289 ha) by 2066. Conversely, broadleaf coverage is expected to increase during the same time period from 167 acres (68 ha) to 283 acres (115 ha).

During the Second World War, a labour shortage led to German and Italian Prisoners of War being used in the planting programme. The PoWs were given accommodation in Thornton Dale and transported into the forest by lorry. In 1950, a large portion of the eastern side of the forest covering 29.4 acres (11.9 ha) was designated an SSSI. The wood, known as Cockrah Wood, overlooks the River Derwent and is noted for its habitats of may lilys. Besides the SSSI, Moor Dike, an ancient earthwork extends across the forest, and three round barrows dated to the Late Bronze Age are within the forest. The earthworks extend down the two main small dales that drain the forest to the south; Bee Dale and Yedman's Dale. Water from the forest finds its way south to be drained by the River Derwent, with the river also forming an eastern edge to the forest. In 1952, the North York Moors National Park was designated, and Wykeham Forest is wholly within the park.

In the 2000s, timber logging at Wykeham Forest yielded around 5,000 tonnes (5,500 tons) annually. In 2003, many of the rabbit warrens in the forest were listed as scheduled monuments. The warrens were a managed system of bred rabbits which supplied pelts to the London millinery trade.

Coniferous trees make up 68% of the forest (22% of which are Larch trees), and broadleaf trees cover 14.9% of the forest. Sitka spruce trees were increased in number and area from 16% of the forest in 2002, to 19% in 2017. This was due to the sitka species being unaffected by deer browsing in comparison to other conifer species. In March 2021, it was announced that the nursery at Wykeham Forest, one of the largest of its kind in England, would be closed by April 2022, and all seed operations would be transferred to another Forestry Commission site at Delamere in Cheshire. The closure announcement led to an early day motion being tabled in Parliament, asking the government to intervene and stop the closure.

== Recreation ==
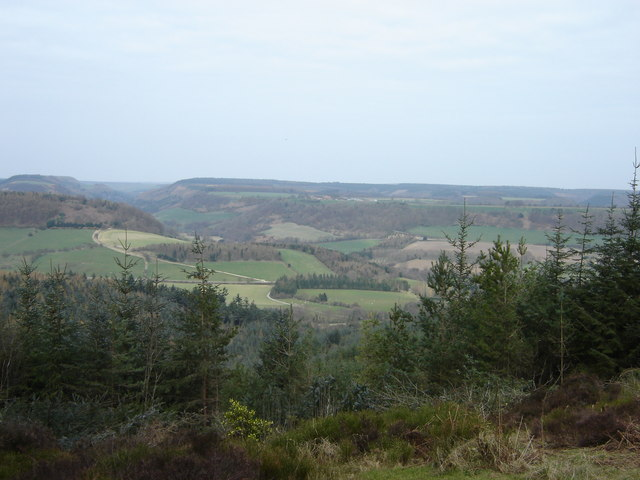
View from Highwood Brow Viewpoint

Some minor roads are present at the western end of the forest, and though logging tracks are present throughout, the eastern end is less accessible to vehicles, though footpaths are located throughout the forest. Many footpaths, including the Tabular Hills Walk, converge at Highwood Brow viewpoint (682 feet (208 m)) at the northern end of the forest. Its elevated spot, with a gap in the trees, offers views across Troutsdale, the Hackness valley, and the River Derwent. Bicycling is also popular within the forest, or as a through route between Scarborough and nearby Dalby Forest.

Horse riding and trail biking are also undertaken within the forest.

== Wildlife ==
Bats are known to be present in the forest, with at least eight species listed in Dalby and Wykeham Forests. Wykeham Forest is known to be a good observation site for the honey buzzard, one of only four locations in England listed by the RSPB. Also seen from Highwood Brow viewpoint have been the rough-legged buzzard, goshawks, nightjars, marsh harrier, hobby, goldcrest, woodcock, spotted flycatcher, willow warbler, garden warbler, redpoll and linnet. Ospreys have also been spotted from Highwood Brow, but not within the forest.
