= John Dawnay, 4th Viscount Downe =

British peer and Whig politician

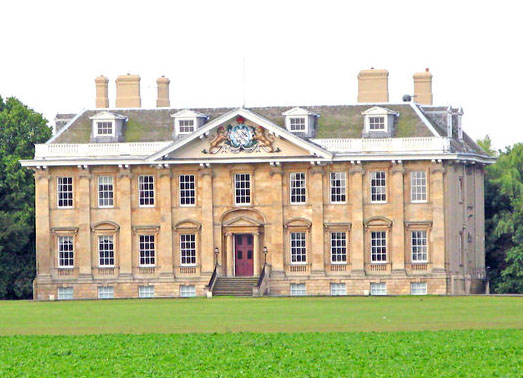
Cowick Hall in the East Riding of Yorkshire, seat of the Viscounts Downe

John Dawnay, 4th Viscount Downe (9 April 1728 – 21 December 1780), was a British peer and Whig politician.

== Background ==
Dawnay was the younger son of John Dawnay, eldest son of Henry Dawnay, 2nd Viscount Downe. His mother was Charlotte Louisa, daughter of Robert Pleydell, while Henry Dawnay, 3rd Viscount Downe, was his elder brother.

== Political career ==
Dawnay was returned to Parliament for Cirencester in 1754. In 1760 he succeeded in the viscountcy after the death of his elder brother in the Seven Years' War. However, as this was an Irish peerage it did not entitle him to a seat in the British House of Lords and consequently did not prevent him from remaining a member of the House of Commons. In 1768 he was returned for Malton, a seat he held until 1774.

== Family ==
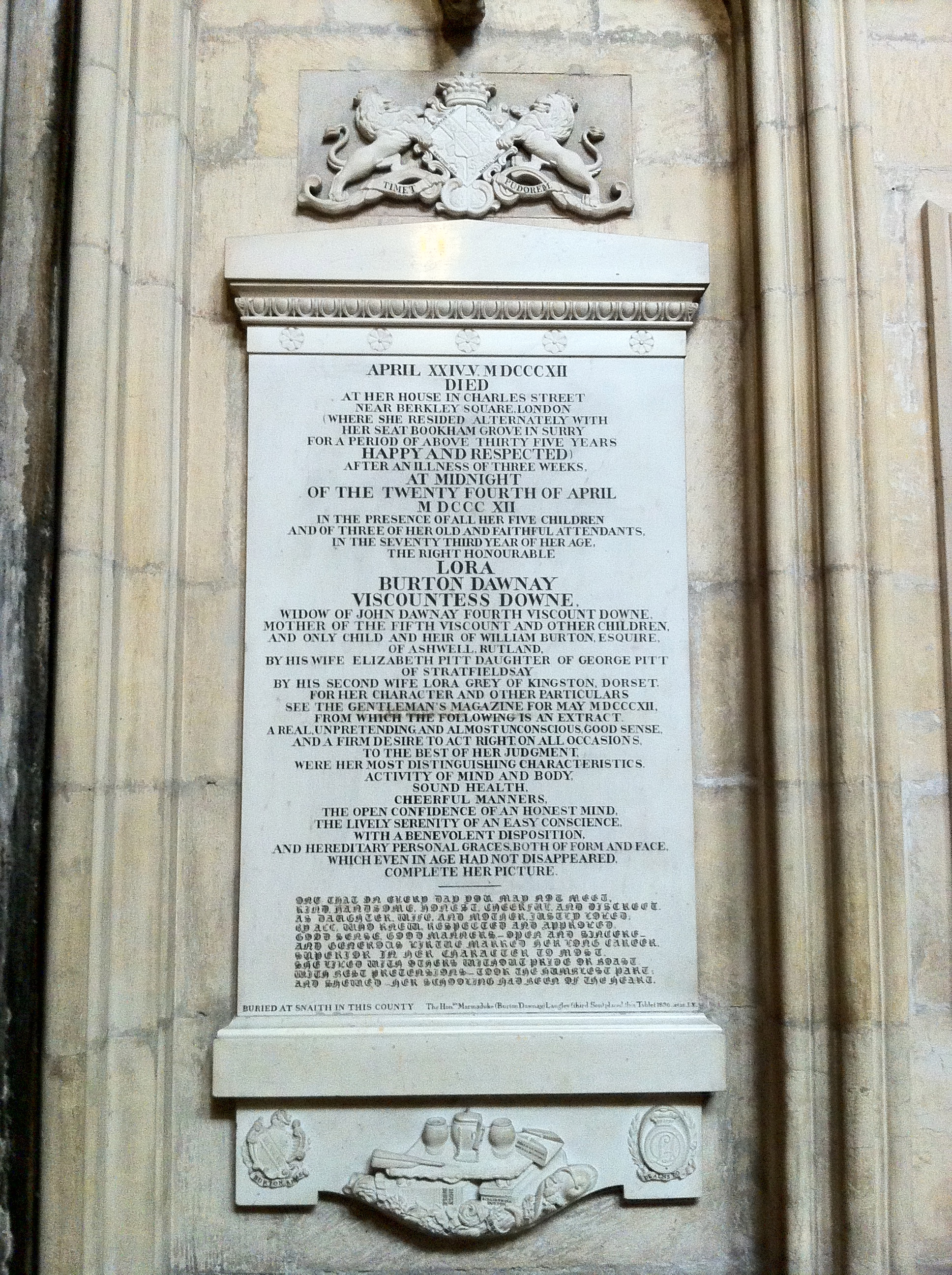
Memorial in the north choir aisle of York Minster. To Lora Burton Dawnay, Viscountess Downe, widow of John Dawnay, 4th Viscount Downe

Lord Downe married Lora, daughter of William Burton, in 1763. They lived at Cowick Hall in Yorkshire and had at least seven children:

- John Dawnay, 5th Viscount Downe (1764–1832)
- William Henry Pleydell Dawnay, died young
- Hon. Catherine Dawnay (23 August 1768 – 9 July 1821)
- William Dawnay, 6th Viscount Downe (1772–1846)
- Hon. Lora Dawnay (b. 17 June 1774), died young
- Hon. Marmaduke Dawnay (26 July 1777 – 1 October 1851), later (1824) Marmaduke Langley
- Hon. Rev. Thomas Dawnay (30 May 1779 – 1 January 1850), rector of Ashwell

Lord Downe died in December 1780, aged 62, and was succeeded by his eldest son, John. The Viscountess Downe died in April 1812, as stated on her monument in York Minster.

Parliament of Great Britain
Preceded by John Coxe; Hon. Henry Bathurst	Member of Parliament for Cirencester; 1754–1768; With: Hon. Benjamin Bathurst 1754–1761; James Whitshed 1761–1768	Succeeded by James Whitshed; Estcourt Creswell
Preceded by John Mostyn; Savile Finch	Member of Parliament for Malton; 1768–1774; With: Savile Finch	Succeeded by Savile Finch; Edmund Burke
Peerage of Ireland
Preceded by Henry Pleydell Dawnay	Viscount Downe; 1760–1780	Succeeded by John Dawnay
