= Robert Monckton (died 1722) =

English landowner and Whig politician

Robert Monckton (c. 1659 – 1722) was an English landowner and Whig politician who sat in the English and British House of Commons between 1695 and 1713. He took an active part supporting William of Orange in the Glorious Revolution, and was notable for his involvement in a number of exceptionally bitter and prolonged electoral disputes.

== Background and early life ==
Robert Monckton's father was Sir Philip Monckton, of Cavil, near Howden, Yorkshire. His mother was Anne Eyre, daughter of Robert Eyre of Highlow Hall, Derbyshire. Robert was the eldest son and had one brother, William, a naval officer, and a sister, Margaret.

Robert Monckton's education seems to have been patchy. On 26 May 1677, aged 17, he entered Sidney Sussex College, Cambridge, the college formerly attended by Oliver Cromwell, but by 19 Nov. 1678 he was receiving legal training at the Middle Temple. He inherited the family estates at about the age of 20.

== Revolutionary career ==
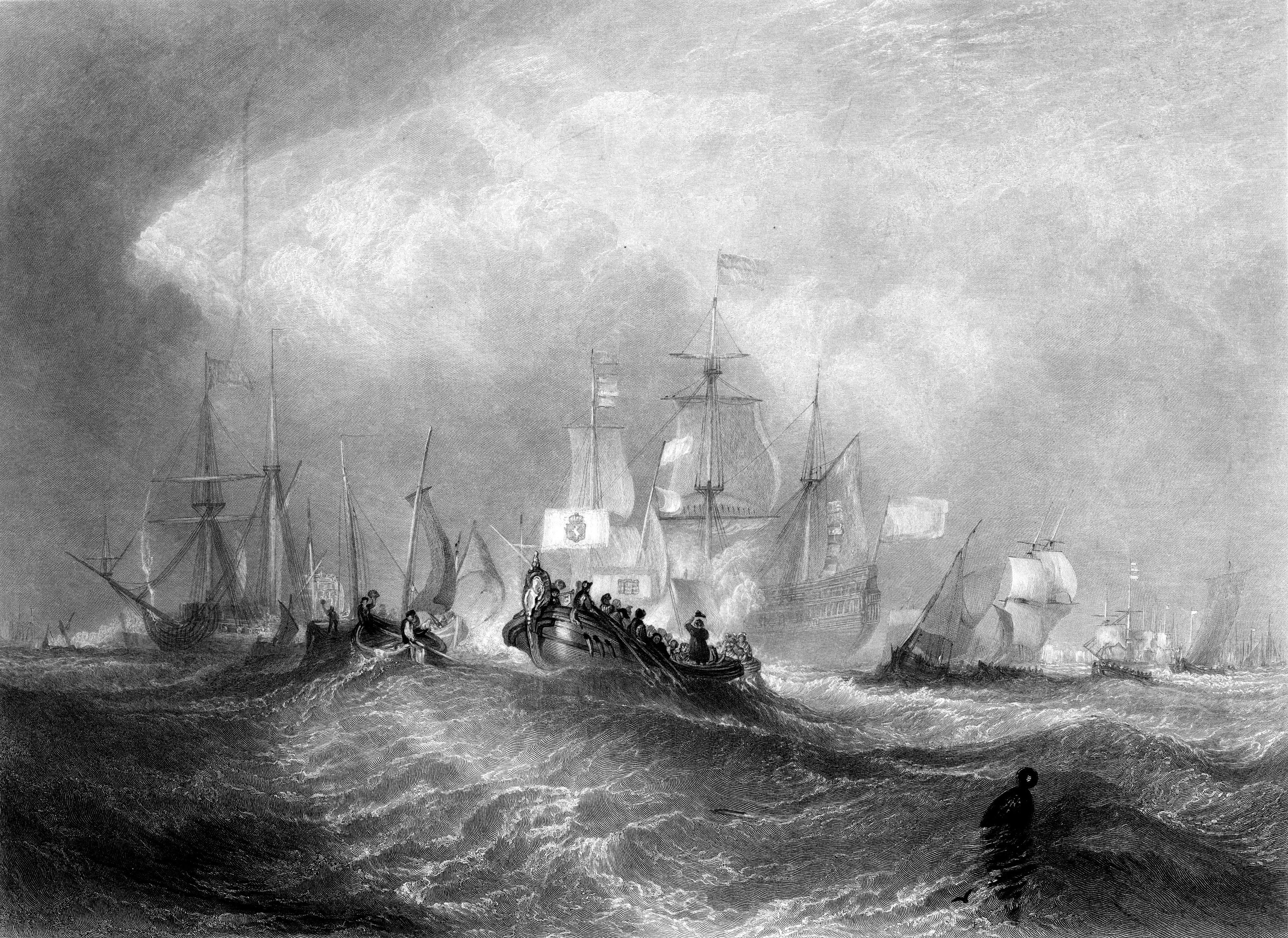
Wiliam III's army lands at Torbay, a key event of the Glorious Revolution, in which Robert Monckton took part.

Unlike his father, who preened himself on his apparently shaky royalist credentials, Robert had Puritan associates: he was listed as Low Church in an analysis of the 1705 Parliament. He became a committed opponent of the Duke of York, later James II. He went into exile in the Netherlands during the 1680s and was commissioned as an officer by William, Prince of Orange, on 10 November 1688. He took part in the invasion which carried through the Glorious Revolution of 1688 and was rewarded with a post as Commissioner for Trade and Plantations.

== Political career ==
=== MP for Pontefract ===
Monckton became a client of the Whig grandee John Holles, 1st Duke of Newcastle-upon-Tyne. With Newcastle's support, he contested the previously Tory constituency of Pontefract at the 1695 English general election. His Whig running mate was Sir William Lowther of Swillington, a Presbyterian landowner who was jeered as a "Commonwealthsman" when he plied the electorate with wine. However, Lowther and Monckton had taken the precaution of securing a number of burgage votes in the borough and there was actually a sizeable Dissenting community in the town, described by an Anglican clergyman as a "schismatic town." Lowther topped the poll with 80 votes and Monckton came a close second with 78. Sir John Bland, a defeated Tory, petitioned against the election, claiming electoral malpractice by the returning officer, but the petition failed.

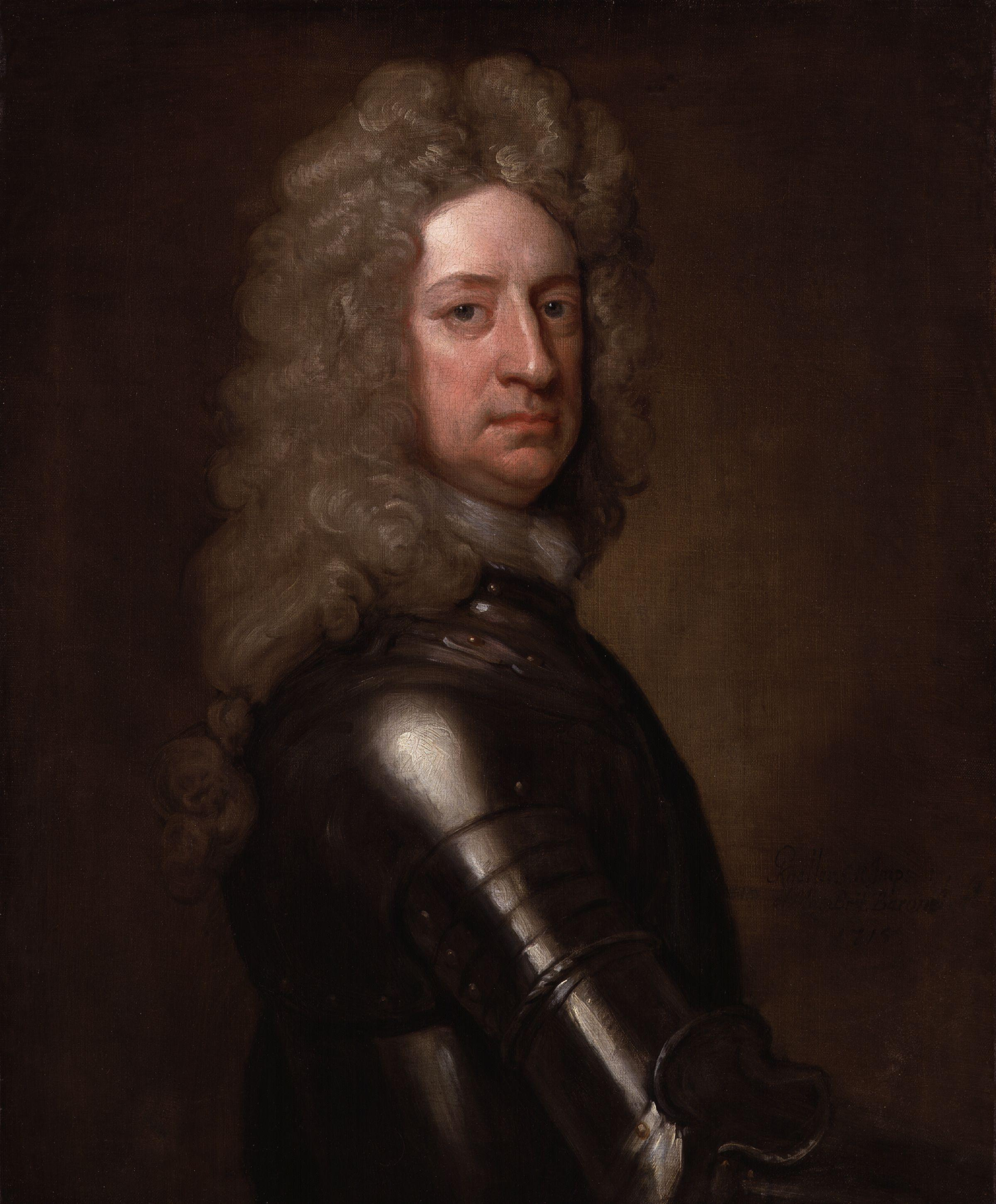
Charles Mordaunt, Earl of Peterborough and Monmouth.

The elections produced a Whig majority in the House of Commons, and William III, who had previously sought to balance Whigs and Tories, now leaned for support on the Whig Junto – a small elite grouping centred on John Somers, later Baron Somers; Charles Montagu, later Earl of Halifax; Thomas Wharton, later Marquess of Wharton and Edward Russell, later Earl of Orford. Monckton was aligned with the Country Whigs, a provincial Member backing the Whig ministry on many measures, but unwilling to countenance the more vindictive policies of the Junto. However, unlike Robert Harley, the most prominent of the Country party, he remained a committed Whig and did not drift toward the Tories.

Monckton was a reliable supporter of the King's economic demands, voting, for example, to fix the guinea at 22 shillings. However he voted against the attainder of Fenwick, the failed and pathetic Jacobite conspirator on 25 November 1696. In February 1697 he was called by the House of Lords as a witness 'to some matters which concern the Earl of Monmouth.' Monmouth had been Monckton's commanding officer in 1688 and had served as Tory First Lord of the Treasury but had since quarrelled with the king. He was accused of complicity in Fenwick's plot and imprisoned but released in March after investigation.

In February 1697 Monckton got into a financial dispute with Richard Vaughan, a blacksmith. Vaughan fetched Thomas Bailey to act as his bailiff, and together with Bailey and John Brown, broke into Monckton's London house in Vine Street. Monckton and his family suffered assault and a complaint of breach of Parliamentary privilege was entered. Bailey, Brown and Vaughan were taken into custody by the Serjeant-at-Arms. All three men petitioned the House unsuccessfully, and Vaughan was imprisoned in the Gatehouse for three days.

It is not clear whether the dispute was politically motivated, but it certainly did not affect Monckton's independence of judgement. Though a faithful Whig, in April he voted and acted as teller against a supply bill for a land tax. He was also enthusiastic about disbanding the army. On the other hand, he took over management of a bill against the corruption of juries and chaired a Committee of the Whole on the matter, although the bill lapsed in 1698, when fresh elections became due.

In the 1698 English general election at Pontefract, Lowther played no part, retiring from Parliament for good. A reliable, radical Whig entered the lists: John Bright, formerly John Liddell, grandson and heir of Sir John Bright, 1st Baronet, a veteran of the Parliamentary army in the English Civil War, whose name he had adopted. Bright and Monckton did not contest the seat on a joint platform. As a result, the Tory Bland topped the poll with 108 votes, while Bright came second with 72, and Monckton a close third with 71. Monckton petitioned against the result, alleging that eight of Bright's voters had no right to vote. Bright counter-petitioned, making essentially the same allegation against Monckton. The investigating committee found in Bright's favour, and put a motion to the House of Commons to declare him elected, but it failed. A motion was put in favour of Monckton but it was rejected without a vote. Hence a fresh election was called. This time Bright beat Monckton by seven votes, but another petition from the burgesses and aldermen alleged further malpractice, and the case was again referred to committee. However, rumours of an early dissolution of Parliament were spreading and Monckton hastened to use his alliance with Newcastle to obtain a safer seat.

=== MP for Aldborough ===
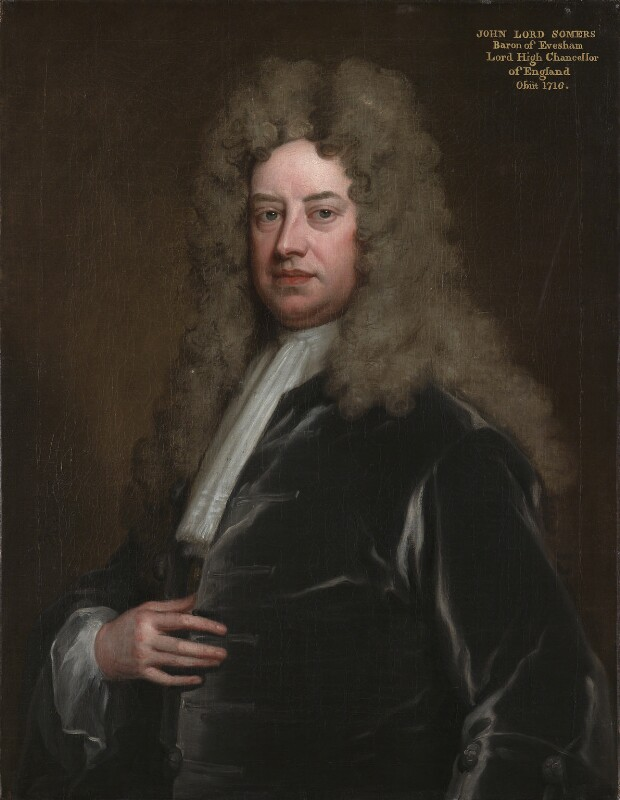
Somers

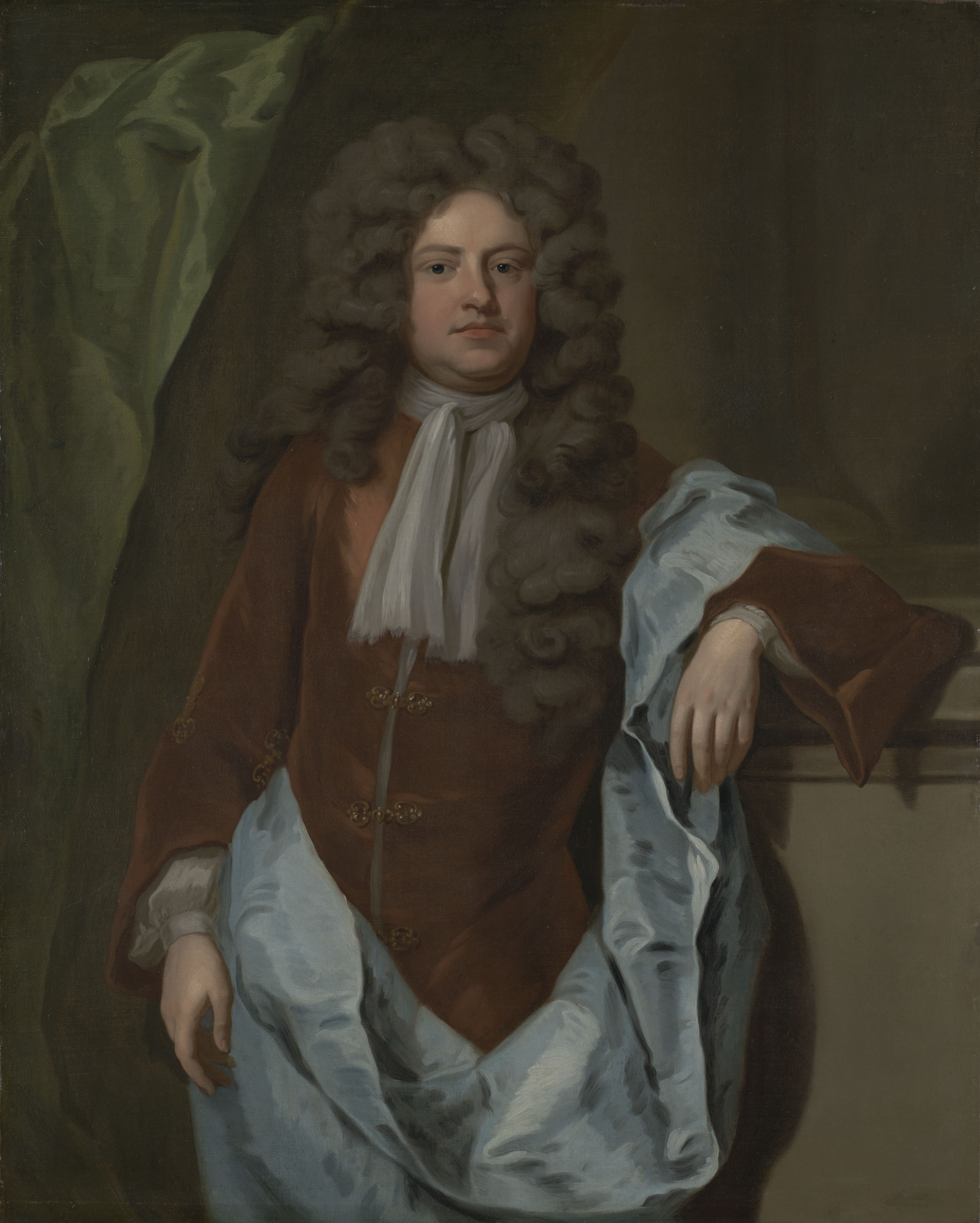
Halifax

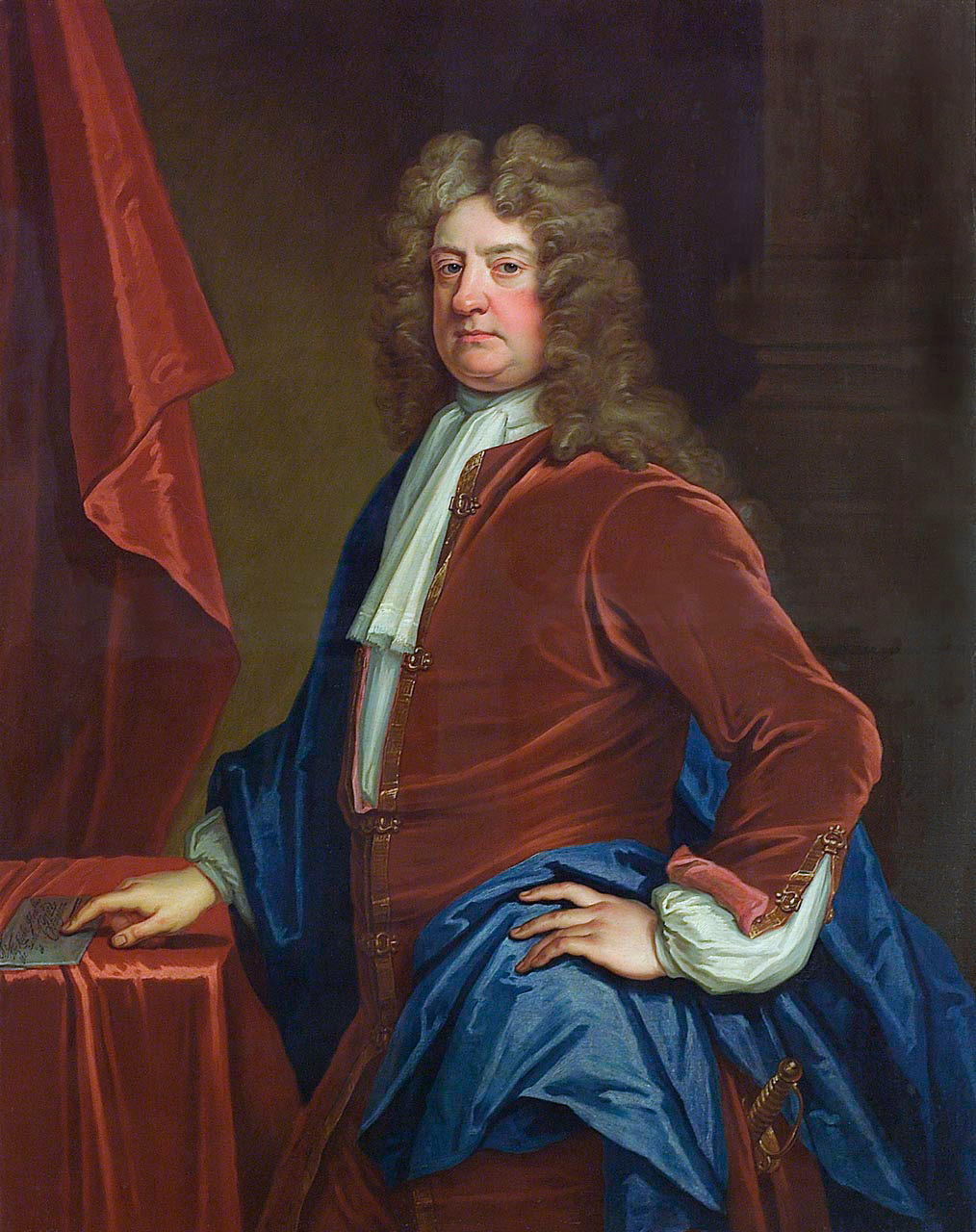
Orford

Three members of the Junto.

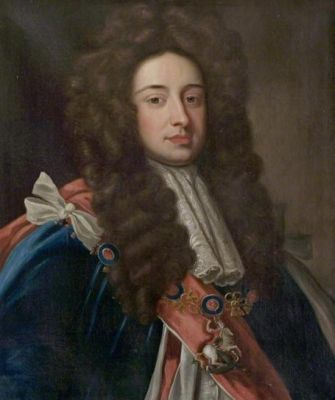
John Holles, 1st Duke of Newcastle-upon-Tyne. Monckton's career rested on his patronage.

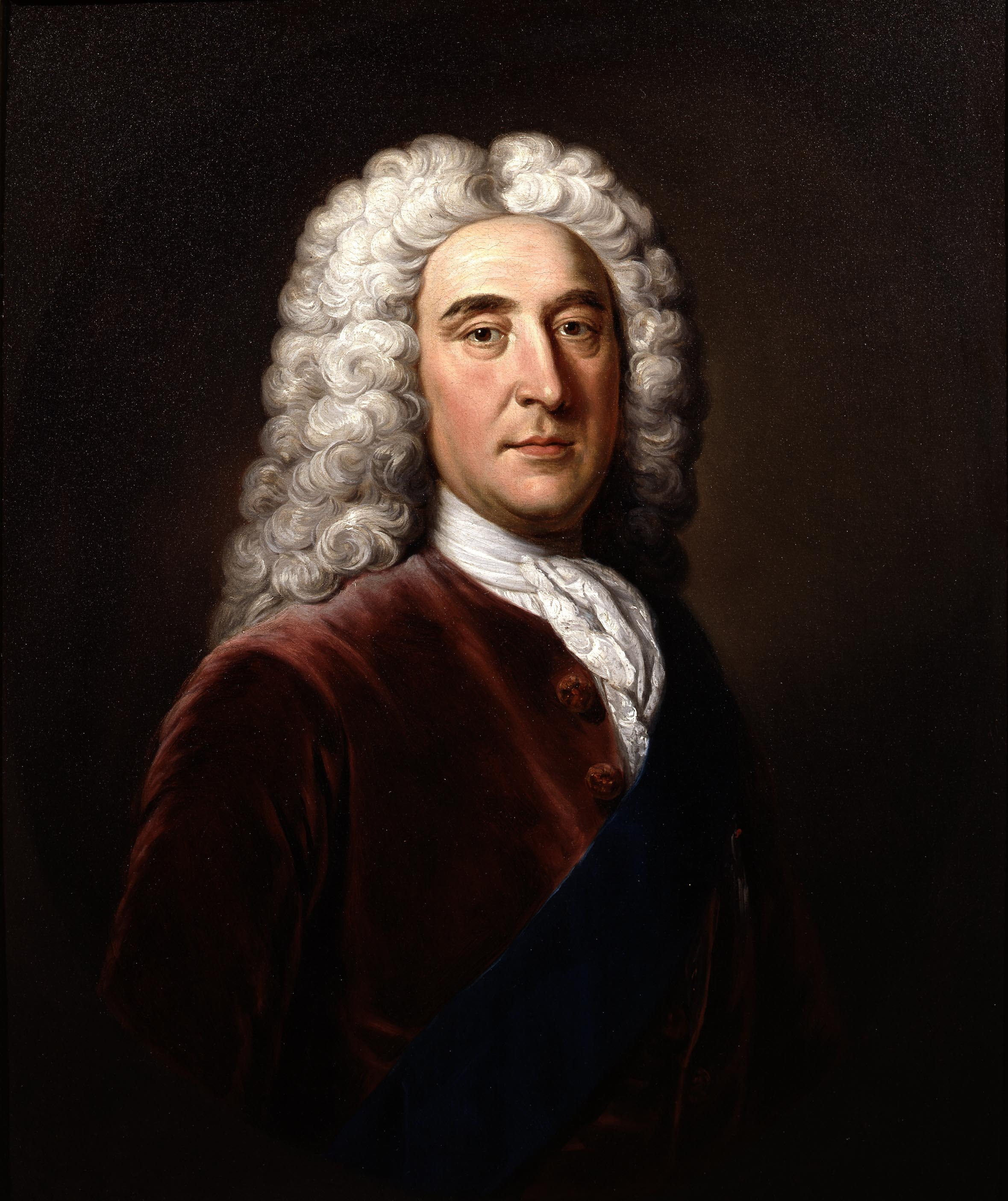
Thomas Pelham-Holles, 1st Duke of Newcastle. His succession to the title resulted in Monckton's loss of political patronage and signalled the eclipse of his political career.

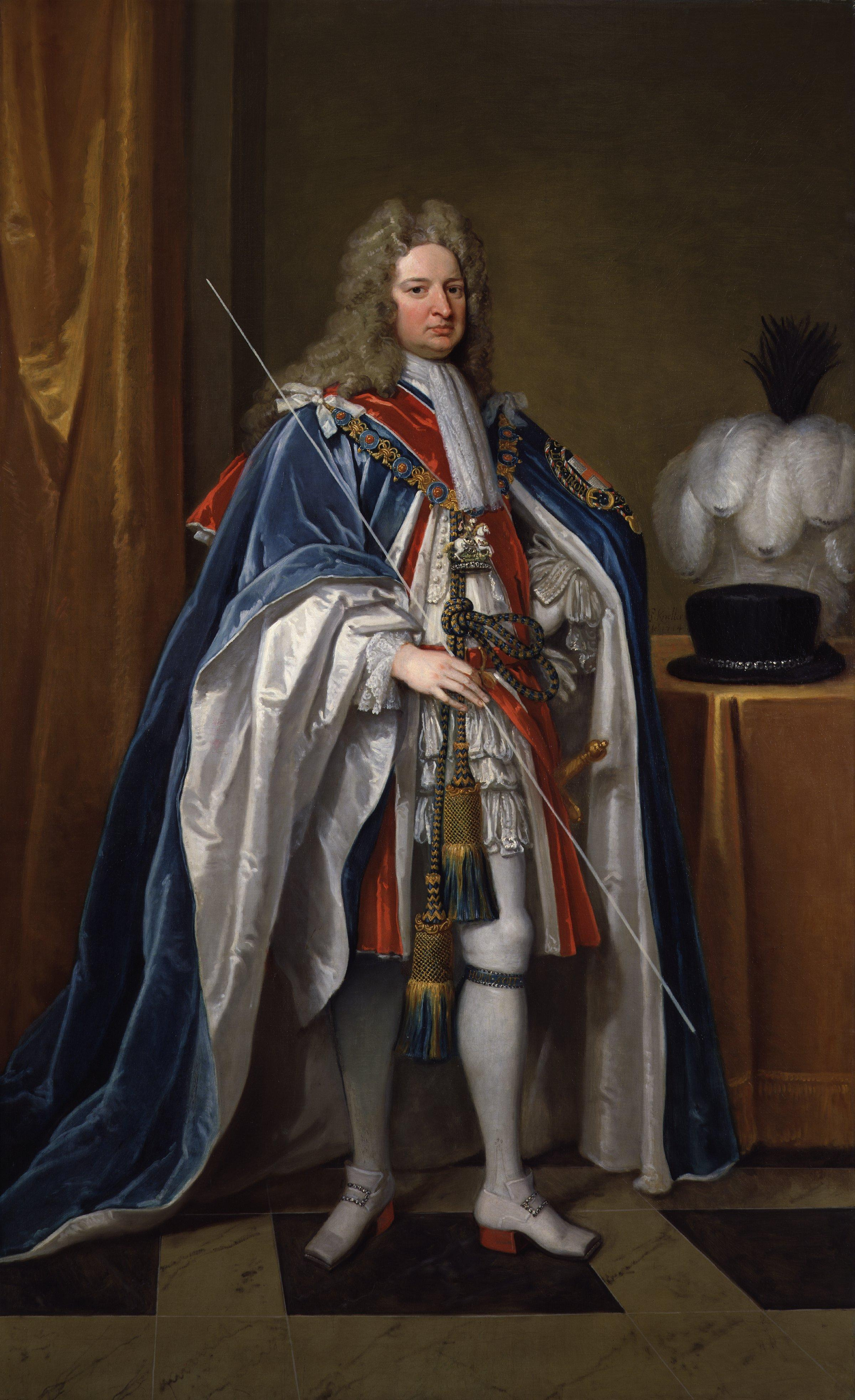
Robert Harley, 1st Earl of Oxford and Earl Mortimer. Initially a Country Whig and a friend of Monckton, who ultimately moved into the Tory party.

Newcastle offered Monckton the borough of Aldborough, where he had recently acquired control by purchase from the Wentworth family, relatives of Lord Wentworth The borough had seen bitter contests in the past, as it was a scot and lot borough, with a wide franchise, though a small electorate. As a result of Newcastle's influence, Monckton was returned as Member of Parliament unopposed in January 1701, along with Cyril Arthington, who had contested the seat unsuccessfully in the past and had the support of another local landowner.

The parliament had a Tory majority and the Junto soon found themselves accused of treason. The first move to redefine party loyalties came in February with a motion to urge the King to recognise the Duke of Anjou, Louis XIV's grandson, as 'King of Spain'. This was a direct attack on the foreign policy of William himself and the previous administration. Monckton denounced this fiercely, saying that "if this vote was carried, he should expect that the next vote would be for owning the pretended Prince of Wales" - a reference to the James Francis Edward Stuart, the "Old Pretender", the Jacobite candidate for the throne supported by Louis XIV. He demanded support for England and its allies in what would soon become the War of the Spanish Succession, saying that "he, for one, would be prepared to eat only roots for the good of his country."

In April came moves to remove the Junto members Somers, Halifax and Orford, together with Portland, from the king's council. Having rejected their extreme measures in the past, Monckton felt obliged to defend them against a pending impeachment. When the motion came up for debate, Monckton proposed an amendment that the House "would support the King in preventing the union of France and Spain and in the maintaining of the trade and commerce of this kingdom." This irrelevant and unpalatable amendment led to heated debate, with Monckton predicting dire commercial consequences for the present policies. Harley, now Speaker, rose and removed his hat, a gesture intended to silence Monckton, but he continued his diatribe, even when called to order.

Parliament was dissolved later the same year and for the second election of 1701 Monckton reassured Newcastle of his Whig loyalties by promising that he would support other Whig candidates in Yorkshire. He and Arthington were returned again, but in a contested election, with another Newcastle client, William Jessop, a close third. At the 1702 English general election, Monckton was elected unopposed alongside Jessop, as Arthington's patron sold his interest to Newcastle.

Monckton and Jessop were returned together unopposed at the 1705 English general election. Monckton never again attained the prominence that marked the first years of the century. He became more and more an agent of Newcastle, acting as go-between in his dealings with Harley, whom he warned against being manipulated by the Tories. He was appointed to the Board of Trade in 1707, a post which allowed him to develop his interest in commerce. He was returned again with Jessopp at the 1708 British general election and generally supported distinctively Whig measures, although he found the venality of the party hard to bear at times. In 1710 he was reported as saying "he'll be no Whig any longer, for he says he angered since he came to town some of his old friends by being so reasonable as to maintain 'twas fit the Queen should use her pleasure in disposing employments as she pleases." However, this was clearly a figure of speech, as he was returned unopposed with Jessop again as a Whig at the 1710 British general election. He was in favour of the Hanoverian Succession, during the 1710–1711 session.

In 1711, Newcastle died. He was succeeded by his nephew Thomas Pelham-Holles. Monckton attempted to intercede in property disputes between the new duke and the dowager duchess, but only alienated both parties. As a result, the duchess announced that she would not support him at Aldborough, although Pelham was publicly undecided. Monckton continued his personal friendship with Harley, now Lord Treasurer and head of a Tory ministry, while still voting with the Whigs on most issues. However Monckton voted against the party line over a 1713 commercial treaty with France, finally losing himself his safe seat. At the 1713 British general election, he was not a candidate at Aldborough but tried his luck again at Pontefract. He came fourth and last in the poll, with two Tories elected.

Even this did not end Monckton's involvement in politics. For another year he continued to give evidence before the Board of Trade, particularly in regard to the activities of Arthur Moore. Moore was a protégé of Henry St John, 1st Viscount Bolingbroke who had been involved in trade negotiations with Spain. Moore was accused of making personal profit from this work, in particular annexing a substantial part of the asiento de negros, the Spanish concession of supplying slaves to the Spain's colonies in the Americas. Monckton accused him of failing to consult the board of trade. He also claimed to have seen a letter referring to an annual 2,000 louis d'or bribe that Moore had been promised. It seems that Monckton's attack was made in concert with a group of Whig leaders, including Lord Halifax. However, it was also rumoured that his contribution was also part of a Tory internecine feud, favouring Harley against Bolingbroke.

The queen died in August 1714, and with a new reign, a new dynasty and a new session of parliament, Monckton retired to his Yorkshire estates. He died in 1722 and was buried on 13 November.

== Marriage and Family ==
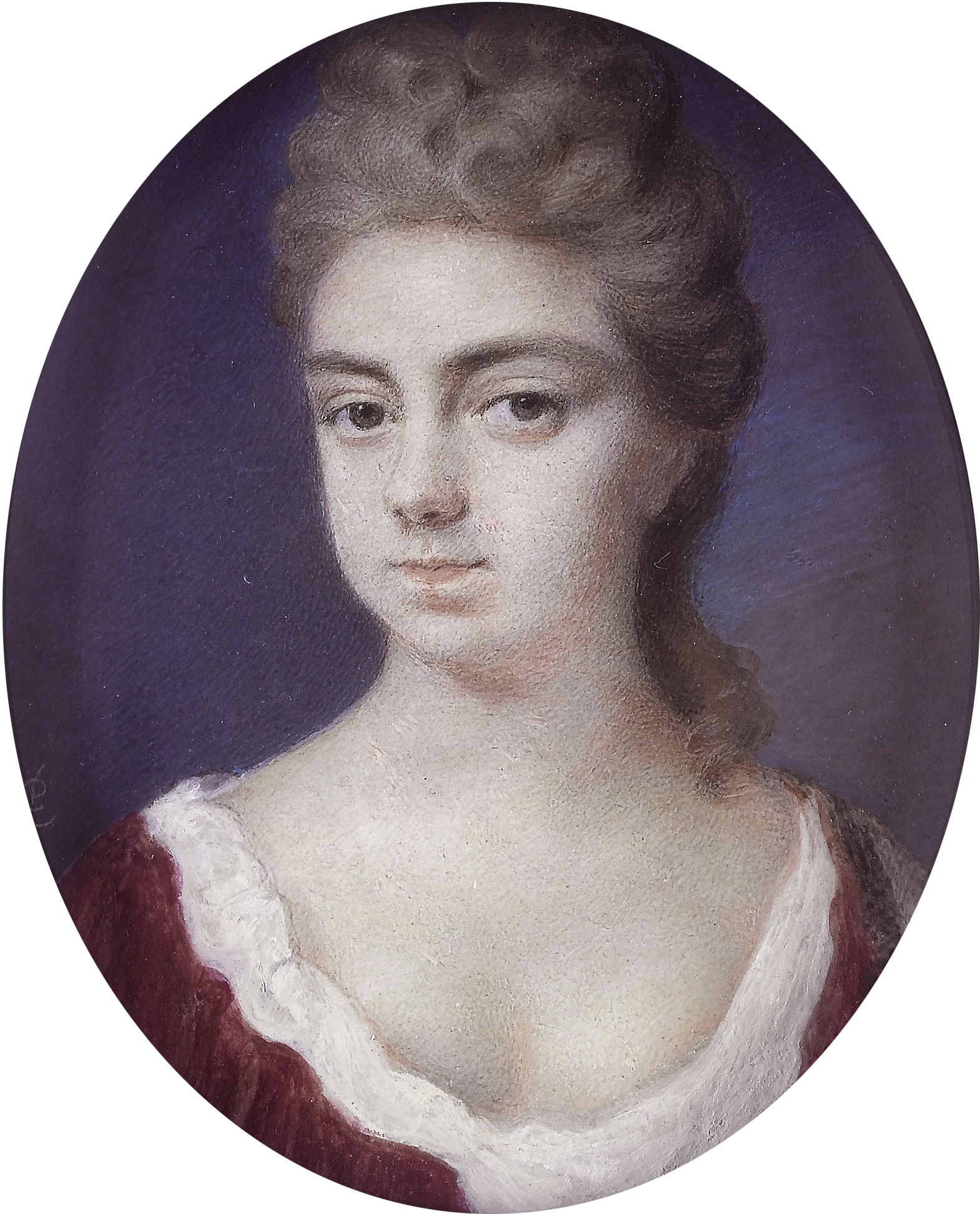
Theodosia Monckton (Peter Cross)

In 1692, Monckton married Theodosia Fountaine, daughter and co-heir of John Fountaine of Melton on the Hill, near Doncaster, and Hodroyd, near Barnsley, Yorkshire. They had a number of children. Robert's heir was John Monckton, later to become the 1st Viscount Galway. He was a very successful Whig politician and a more pliable client of the Pelhams than Robert had proved.

Parliament of England
Preceded by Sir John Bland; Hon. Henry Dawnay	Member of Parliament for Pontefract; 1695–1698; With: William Lowther	Succeeded by John Bright; Sir John Bland
Preceded by Sir George Cooke; Sir Abstrupus Danby	Member of Parliament for Aldborough; 1701–1707; With: Cyril Arthington; William Jessop	Succeeded by Parliament of Great Britain
Parliament of Great Britain
Preceded by Parliament of England	Member of Parliament for Aldborough; 1707–1713; With: William Jessop	Succeeded by John Dawnay; Paul Foley
