= Henry Dawnay, 3rd Viscount Downe =

British soldier and politician

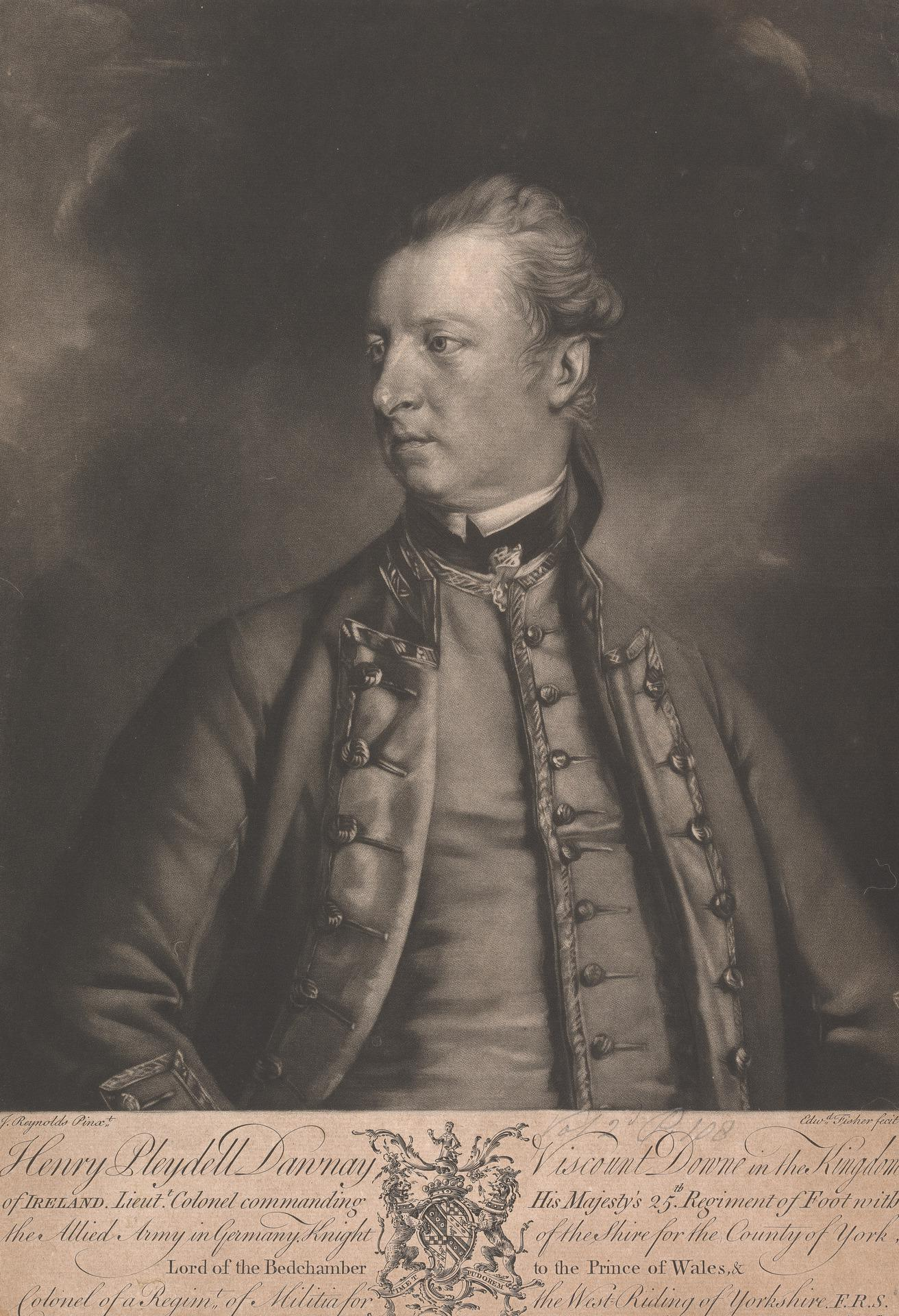
Henry Dawnay, 3rd Viscount Downe

Lieutenant-Colonel Henry Pleydell Dawnay, 3rd Viscount Downe FRS (8 April 1727 – 9 December 1760), was a British soldier and politician.

Dawnay was the eldest son of the Honourable John Dawnay, son of Henry Dawnay, 2nd Viscount Downe. His mother was Charlotte Louisa, daughter of Robert Pleydell, of Ampney Crucis, Gloucestershire. He succeeded his grandfather in the viscountcy in May 1741, aged 14. As this was an Irish peerage it did not entitle him to a seat in the English House of Lords (although it did entitle him to a seat in the Irish House of Lords). He was consequently eligible for election to the House of Commons and in 1750 he was returned as one of two Knights of the Shire for Yorkshire, a seat he held until his death ten years later. Lord Downe also served in the Seven Years' War as a lieutenant-colonel in the 25th Foot. He fought in the Battle of Minden in 1759 and commanded the regiment in the Battle of Campen in October 1760. He died in December 1760 from wounds received during the latter battle, aged 33.

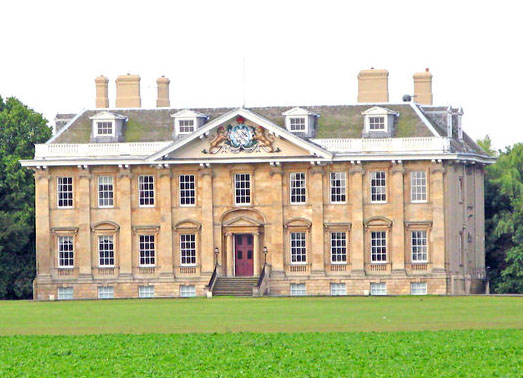
Cowick Hall in the East Riding of Yorkshire, seat of the Viscounts Downe

Lord Downe never married and was succeeded by his younger brother, John.

Parliament of Great Britain
Preceded by Sir Miles Stapylton, Bt; Sir Conyers Darcy	Member of Parliament for Yorkshire; 1750–1760; With: Sir Conyers Darcy 1750–1759; Sir George Savile, Bt 1759–1760	Succeeded by Sir George Savile, Bt; Edwin Lascelles
Peerage of Ireland
Preceded by Henry Dawnay	Viscount Downe; 1741–1760	Succeeded by John Dawnay
