= Dawnay =

- Origin: South Africa
- Genres: Pop
- Occupations: Singer, producer, songwriter
- Years active: 2000–present
- Labels: WEA, Eternal, Robroy Music
- Website: www.dawnaymusic.com

Dawnay is a South African singer, producer and songwriter best known for his hit "U Touch Me" which broke records in South Africa when it spent 22 weeks at the top of the charts in 2001, toppling artists such as Destiny's Child and Shaggy from the No. 1 position. Dawnay opened for Shaggy in 2002. In 2002 Dawnay also received a SAMA nomination for "Best pop album". Dawnay's hit song "You touch me", was also used in a "Simba" advert and the song was also the only local song used in the Coca-Cola pop stars auditions. Following South African success, WEA / Eternal (part of Warner Music) in the UK picked up the license. In 2002, a promo 12" vinyl and CD single was released featuring remixes by Almighty, Xenomania and Nip & Tuck. "U Touch Me" is published by Robroy Music

== Discography ==
- 12". UK. ETERNAL. SAM00675. (2002)
- U Touch Me (Live Mix) 4.34
- U Touch Me (Almighty Mix) 7.53
- U Touch Me (Xenomania Club Mix) 6.27
- U Touch Me (Nip & Tucks Funky Facelift) 6.09

UK CD SAM00675 (2002)

- U Touch Me (Live Mix) 4.34
- U Touch Me (Almighty Mix) 7.53
- U Touch Me (Xenomania Club Mix) 6.27
- U Touch Me (Supafly Dub) 6.46
- U Touch Me (Nip & Tucks Funky Facelift) 6.09
