= Ruston, North Yorkshire =

Village in North Yorkshire, England

Coordinates: 54.234889°N 0.530535°W

Ruston
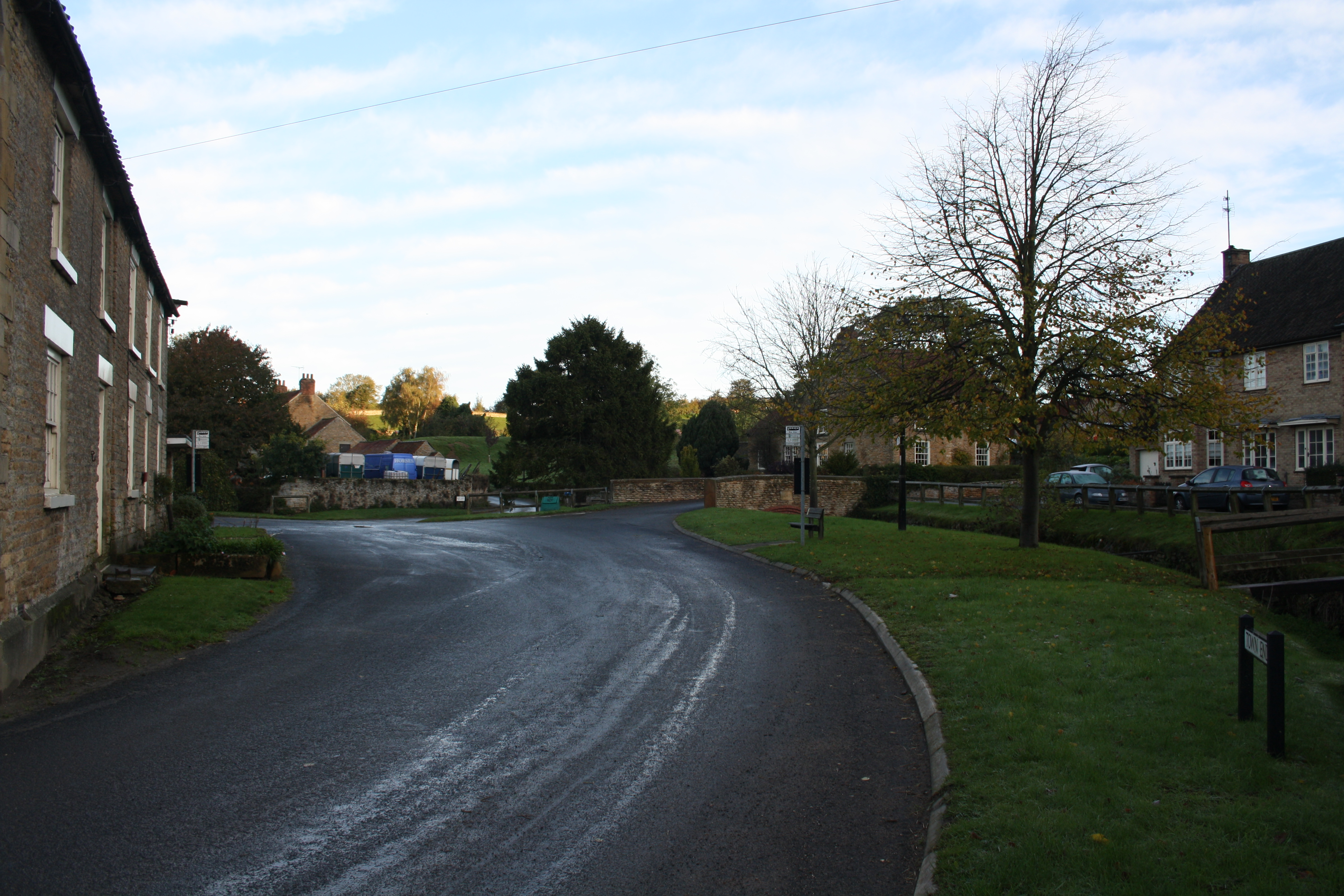

- Location within North Yorkshire
- OS grid reference: SE958831
  - London: 190 mi (310 km) S
- Civil parish: Wykeham
- Unitary authority: North Yorkshire
- Ceremonial county: North Yorkshire
- Region: Yorkshire and the Humber
- Country: England
- Sovereign state: United Kingdom
- Post town: SCARBOROUGH
- Postcode district: YO13
- Police: North Yorkshire
- Fire: North Yorkshire
- Ambulance: Yorkshire
- UK Parliament: Scarborough and Whitby

Ruston is a small village in the county of North Yorkshire, England, forming part of the civil parish of Wykeham. The village is situated just off the A170 road, and approximately 7 miles (11 km) south-west from Scarborough. Ruston is mentioned in the Domesday Book as having ploughlands and woodlands, though the derivation of the name is unknown; it could possibly stem from Hrōst, which is Old English for roof-beam.

From 1974 to 2023 it was part of the Borough of Scarborough, it is now administered by the unitary North Yorkshire Council.
