= John Dawnay, 5th Viscount Downe =

British Whig politician

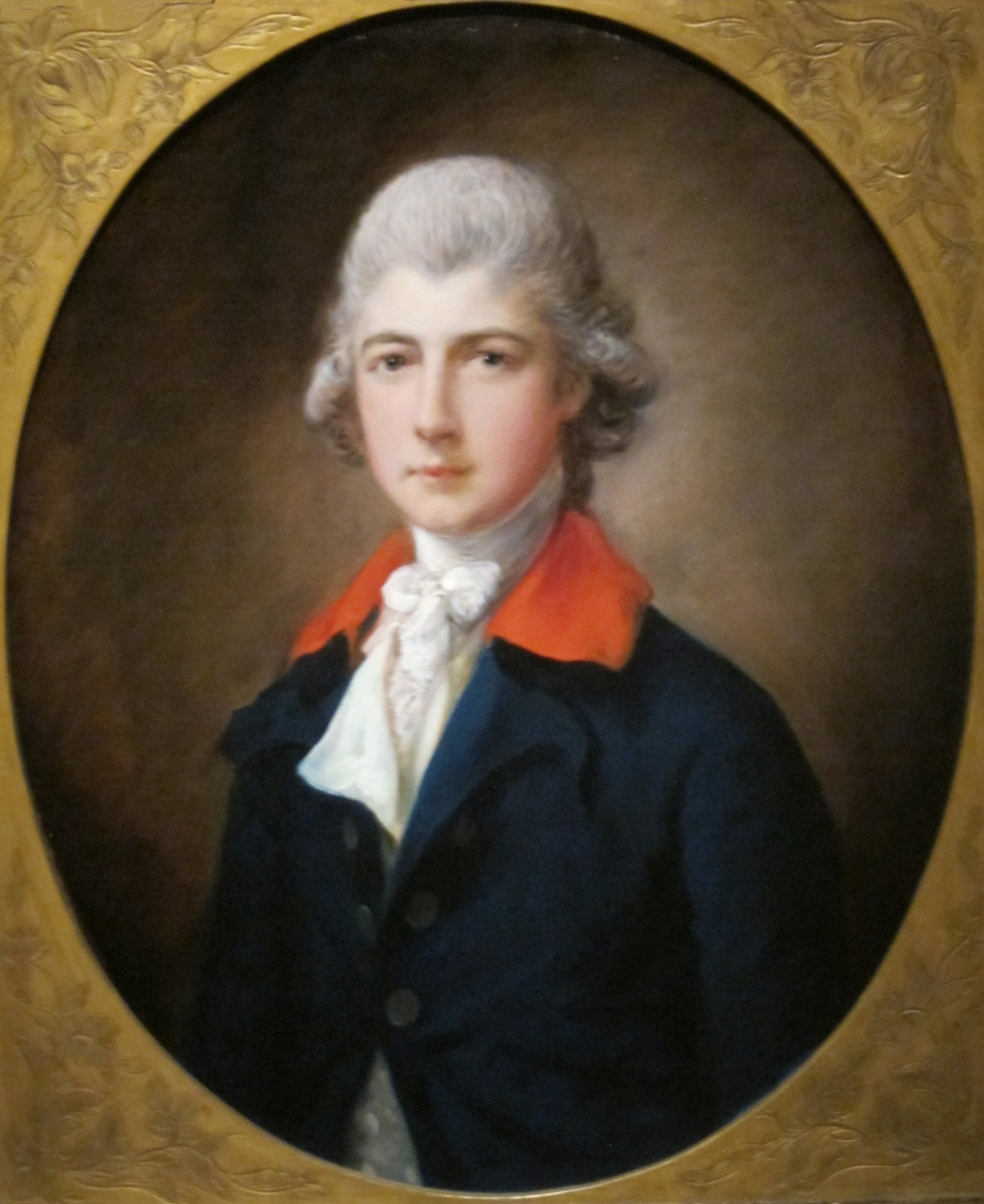
John Dawnay at age 17 by Thomas Gainsborough

John Christopher Burton Dawnay, 5th Viscount Downe (15 November 1764 – 18 February 1832), styled The Honourable John Dawnay until 1780, was a British Whig politician and peer.

Dawnay was the eldest son of John Dawnay, 4th Viscount Downe, by Laura, daughter of William Burton, of Luffenham, Rutland. He succeeded his father in the viscountcy in 1780. However, as this was an Irish peerage it did not entitle him to a seat in the English House of Lords. He subsequently sat as Member of Parliament for Petersfield between 1787 and 1790 and for Wootton Basset between 1790 and 1796. The latter year he was created Baron Dawnay, of Cowick in the County of York, in the Peerage of Great Britain, which gave him a seat in the House of Lords.

Lord Downe was twice married. He married firstly a daughter of Major John Scott of Balconie. After her death in 1798 he married secondly Louisa Maria, daughter of George Welstead, of Apsley, Sussex, in 1815. There were no children from the two marriages. Downe died in February 1832, aged 67. The barony of Dawnay died with him while he was succeeded in the viscountcy by his younger brother, Reverend William Henry Dawnay.

His widow spent her later years at Bowden Hall in Upton St Leonards, where she endowed the local primary school. The Viscountess Downe died in March 1867.

Parliament of Great Britain
Preceded by William Jolliffe; Thomas Samuel Jolliffe	Member of Parliament for Petersfield; 1787–1790; With: William Jolliffe	Succeeded by William Jolliffe; Hon. George North
Preceded by Hon. George North; Hon. Robert Seymour-Conway	Member of Parliament for Wootton Basset; 1790–1796; With: John Stanley	Succeeded by John Denison; Edward Clarke
Peerage of Ireland
Preceded by John Downe	Viscount Downe; 1780–1832	Succeeded by William Dawnay
Peerage of Great Britain
New creation	Baron Dawnay; 1796–1832	Extinct
