= Forest Live =

British annual music festival

- Genre: Rock; pop
- Dates: June – July
- Location: United Kingdom
- Years active: 2001 – present
- Website: Forest Live

Forest Live (formerly Forest Tour) is an annual British music festival featuring predominantly pop and rock bands and artist. The series of concerts are organised by the Forestry Commission, a British non-ministerial government department. The events are hosted in seven forest venues throughout the United Kingdom. The tour began in 2000, as part of an initiative to bring new audiences into forests, and encourage people to see their woodlands.

== History ==
=== 2001 ===
- Levellers
- Jools Holland

=== 2002 ===
- Pulp
- Jools Holland

=== 2003 ===
- Status Quo
- Jools Holland
- The Beach Boys
- Courtney Pine
- Motörhead

=== 2004 ===
- Paul Weller
- Bryan Ferry
- Jools Holland
- Sugababes
- Fun Lovin' Criminals
- Status Quo

=== 2005 ===
- Madness
- The Beautiful South
- Ian Brown
- Daniel Bedingfield
- Jools Holland

=== 2006 ===
- UB40
- Embrace
- Massive Attack
- Jamie Cullum
- Van Morrison
- Pet Shop Boys
- KT Tunstall
- The Coral

=== 2007 ===
- James Morrison
- Travis
- The Feeling
- Blondie
- Van Morrison
- The Charlatans
- Jools Holland
- M People

=== 2008 ===
- The Zutons
- Crowded House
- Elbow
- KT Tunstall
- McFly
- Status Quo
- The Charlatans
- Katherine Jenkins
- Jools Holland

=== 2009 ===
- Paul Weller
- Doves
- Simply Red
- James Morrison
- McFly
- Sugababes
- David Gray
- The Human League
- Vanessa-Mae
- Status Quo
- Jools Holland

=== 2010 ===
- Simply Red
- Keane
- Doves
- Scouting for Girls
- JLS
- Blondie
- Status Quo
- James Morrison
- Katie Melua
- The Saturdays

=== 2011 ===
- Erasure
- Simple Minds
- Bryan Ferry
- Texas
- The Script
- Scouting for Girls
- Status Quo
- The Courteeners
- Westlife

=== 2012 ===
- Plan B
- Will Young
- Ed Sheeran
- Madness
- Alfie Boe
- The Darkness
- Steps
- The Wanted
- The Wombats
- Razorlight

=== 2013 ===
- Paloma Faith
- Blondie
- Paul Weller
- The Script
- Olly Murs
- Jessie J
- The Charlatans
- James
- Jools Holland's Rhythm and Blues Orchestra
- Elvis Costello

=== 2014 ===
- Paul Weller
- Jessie J
- Boyzone
- Suede
- Rebecca Ferguson
- James Blunt
- Katherine Jenkins
- Deacon Blue
- Little Mix
- The Pogues

=== 2015 ===
- Paloma Faith
- Tom Odell
- The Vamps
- Paul Heaton and Jacqui Abbott
- Sam Smith
- The Script
- Robert Plant and the Sensational Space Shifters
- Spandau Ballet
- McBusted
- James

=== 2016 ===
- Rudimental
- Kaiser Chiefs
- UB40
- Tom Jones
- Guy Garvey
- John Newman
- Jake Bugg
- Paul Heaton and Jacqui Abbott
- Simply Red
- James Bay

=== 2017 ===
- Rick Astley
- Craig David
- Elbow
- Olly Murs
- Tom Jones
- Clean Bandit

=== 2018 ===
- Gary Barlow
- George Ezra
- Paul Heaton and Jacqui Abbott
- Kasabian
- Paloma Faith
- The Script
- UB40 with Ali, Astro & Mickey

=== 2019 ===
- Foals
- Haçienda Classical
- Jack Savoretti
- Jess Glynne
- Paul Weller
- Stereophonics
- Tears For Fears

=== 2020 ===
All of the 2020 concerts were cancelled due to the COVID-19 outbreak which hit the UK, but confirmed artists were.

- Rag'n'Bone Man
- Will Young
- James Morrison
- Madness
- Keane
- Noel Gallagher's High Flying Birds
- Kaiser Chiefs
- Jack Savoretti
- Madness
- Jools Holland & his Rhythm & Blues Orchestra

=== 2021 ===
All of 2021 concerts were postponed until 2022 due to the COVID pandemic.

=== 2022 ===
- Rag'n'Bone Man
- Madness (band)
- Keane (band)
- Noel Gallagher's High Flying Birds
- Texas (band)
