= Guy Dawnay =

Guy Dawnay may refer to:

- Guy Dawnay (politician) (1848–1889), British soldier and Conservative politician
- Guy Dawnay (British Army officer) (1878–1952), his nephew, army officer and merchant banker
