= Henry Dawnay, 2nd Viscount Downe =

English Tory politician

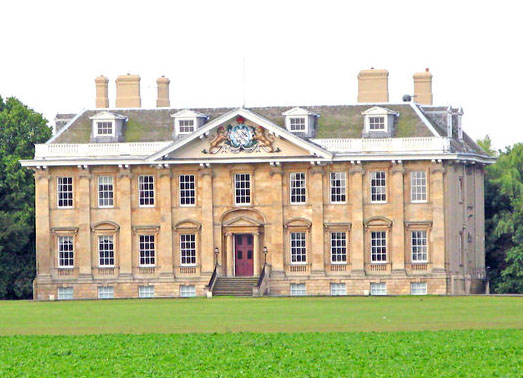
Cowick Hall in the East Riding of Yorkshire, seat of the Viscounts Downe

Henry Dawnay, 2nd Viscount Downe (7 June 1664 – 21 May 1741), styled The Honourable Henry Dawnay between 1681 and 1695, was an English Tory politician who sat in the English House of Commons between 1690 and 1707 and in the British House of Commons from 1708 to 1727.

Dawnay was the son of John Dawnay, 1st Viscount Downe, by his second wife Dorothy, daughter of William Johnson, of Wickham, Lancashire.

Dawnay succeeded his father as Member of Parliament for Pontefract in 1690, a seat he held until 1695. In 1695, he also succeeded his father in the viscountcy. As this was an Irish peerage it did not entitle him to a seat in the English House of Lords (although it did entitle him to a seat in the Irish House of Lords). He was consequently eligible for election to the English House of Commons and in 1698 he was elected Member of Parliament for Yorkshire, a seat he held until 1700. He was returned as MP for Yorkshire at a by-election in December 1707 and was re-elected MP for Yorkshire at the 1708 general election. He was elected again in 1710, 1713, and 1715 1722.

Lord Downe married Mildred, daughter of William Godfrey, of Thornock, Lincolnshire, in 1685. She died in August 1725. Downe remained a widower until his death in May 1741, aged 76. He was succeeded in the viscountcy by his grandson, Henry, his son the Honourable John Dawnay having predeceased him.

== Ancestry chart ==
Ancestors of Henry Dawnay, 2nd Viscount Downe

4. John Dawnay of Womersley, Yorkshire
2. John Dawnay, 1st Viscount Downe
20. Anthony Hutton
10. Sir Richard Hutton
5. Elizabeth Hutton
22. Thomas Briggs of Cawmire, Westmorland
11. Agnes Briggs
1. Henry Dawnay, 2nd Viscount Downe
6. William Johnson, of Wickham
3. Dorothy Johnson

Parliament of England
Preceded by The Viscount Downe; Sir Thomas Yarburgh	Member of Parliament for Pontefract; 1690–1695; With: Sir John Bland, Bt	Succeeded by William Lowther; Robert Monckton
Preceded by Sir John Kaye, Bt; The Lord Fairfax of Cameron	Member of Parliament for Yorkshire; 1698–1701; With: The Lord Fairfax of Cameron	Succeeded by The Lord Fairfax of Cameron; Sir John Kaye, Bt
Parliament of Great Britain
Preceded by The Marquess of Hartington; The Lord Fairfax of Cameron	Member of Parliament for Yorkshire; 1707–1727; With: Conyers Darcy 1707–1708; Sir William Strickland, Bt 1708–1710; Sir Arthur Kaye, Bt 1710–1727; Cholmley Turner 1727	Succeeded by Cholmley Turner; Sir Thomas Watson-Wentworth
Peerage of Ireland
Preceded by John Dawnay	Viscount Downe; 1695–1741	Succeeded by Henry Pleydell Dawnay
