= John Dawnay (MP) =

British politician

The Honourable John Dawnay (8 December 1686 – 12 August 1740) of Cowick Hall, Yorkshire was a British politician who sat in the House of Commons between 1713 and 1716.

Dawnay was the son of Henry Dawnay, 2nd Viscount Downe and his wife Mildred Godfrey, daughter of William Godfrey, of Thornock, Lincolnshire. He matriculated at Christ Church, Oxford on 16 July 1703, aged 16 and was created M.A. on 9 July 1706.

At the 1713 general election Dawney was returned as Member of Parliament for Aldborough and Pontefract constituencies. There was a petition against the result at Aldborough, but this had not been resolved by the time the Parliament was dissolved in 1715. While there was an outstanding petition against one of the elections, he was not required to choose which constituency he would represent, and so sat for both boroughs throughout the Parliament. He was returned for Pontefract at the 1715 general election until he was unseated on petition on 22 March 1716.

Dawnay married Charlotte Louisa, daughter of Robert Pleydell, of Ampney Crucis, Gloucestershire, on 10 August 1724. She died in April 1729. Dawnay died on 31 July 1740, aged 53, predeceasing his father by one year and was buried on 12 August at Snaith. His sons Henry and John both succeeded in turn to the viscountcy.

Parliament of Great Britain
Preceded by Robert Monckton; William Jessop	Member of Parliament for Aldborough; 1713–1715; With: Paul Foley	Succeeded by James Stanhope; William Jessop
Preceded by Sir John Bland, Bt; Robert Frank	Member of Parliament for Pontefract; 1713–1716; With: Robert Frank	Succeeded by Sir William Lowther, Bt; Hugh Bethell
