= John Dawnay, 1st Viscount Downe =

English politician

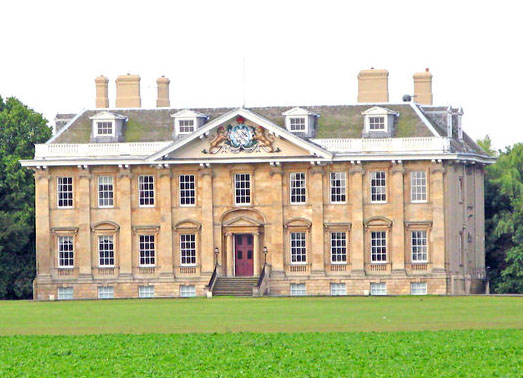
Cowick Hall in the East Riding of Yorkshire, seat of the Viscounts Downe

John Dawnay, 1st Viscount Downe (c. 1625 – 1 October 1695), known as Sir John Dawnay between 1660 and 1681, was an English politician who sat in the House of Commons between 1660 and 1690.

Dawnay was the son of John Dawnay of Womersley, Yorkshire and his wife Elizabeth Hutton, daughter of Sir Richard Hutton, a Judge of the King's Bench. He was baptised on 25 January 1625. He entered Gray's Inn and Jesus College, Cambridge in 1641.

In 1660, Dawnay was elected Member of Parliament for Yorkshire in the Convention Parliament. He was knighted on 2 June 1660. In 1661 he was elected MP for Pontefract in the Cavalier Parliament. He was re-elected MP for Pontefract in the two elections of 1679. He was raised to the Peerage of Ireland as Viscount Downe on 19 February 1681. As this was an Irish peerage he could remain a member of the House of Commons and he was re-elected in 1681, 1685 and 1689.

In 1687, he acquired the mansion at 15 St James's Square, Westminster.

He commissioned the building of Cowick Hall in East Yorkshire in the late 17th century. Dawnay died in October 1695, aged 70, and was succeeded in the viscountcy by his son Henry.

Lord Downe was twice married. He married firstly Elizabeth Melton, daughter of Sir John Melton, in 1645. After her death in February 1662 he married secondly Dorothy Wickham, daughter of William Johnson, of Wickham, Lancashire, in 1663 Sir Christopher Dawnay, 1st Baronet, was his brother.

Parliament of England
Both seats vacant	Member of Parliament for Yorkshire; 1660–1661; With: The Lord Fairfax of Cameron	Succeeded by Conyers Darcy; Sir John Goodricke, Bt
Preceded by William Lowther; Sir George Savile, Bt	Member of Parliament for Pontefract; 1661–1690; With: William Lowther 1661–1679; Sir Patience Ward 1679–1685; Sir Thomas Yarburgh 1685–1690	Succeeded by Hon. Henry Dawnay; Sir John Bland, Bt
Peerage of Ireland
New creation	Viscount Downe; 1681–1685	Succeeded by Henry Dawnay
