= Wykeham, Scarborough =

Village and civil parish in North Yorkshire, England

Coordinates: 54.23728°N 0.52201°W

Wykeham
- Location within North Yorkshire
- Population: 280 (2011 census)
- OS grid reference: SE964834
- Civil parish: Wykeham
- Unitary authority: North Yorkshire
- Ceremonial county: North Yorkshire
- Region: Yorkshire and the Humber
- Country: England
- Sovereign state: United Kingdom
- Post town: SCARBOROUGH
- Postcode district: YO13
- Police: North Yorkshire
- Fire: North Yorkshire
- Ambulance: Yorkshire
- UK Parliament: Scarborough and Whitby

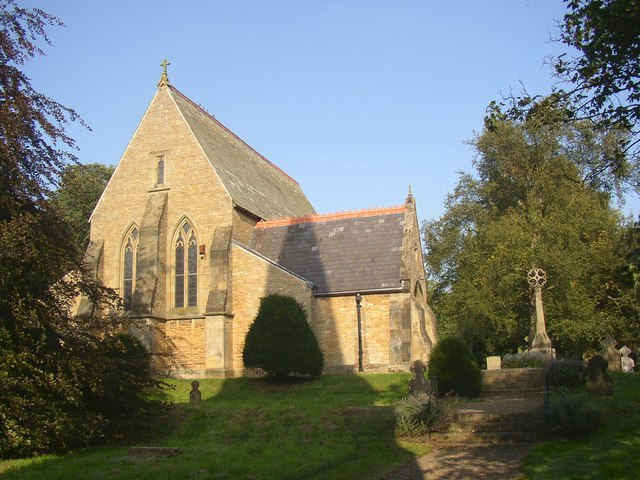
St Helen and All Saints' Church

Wykeham is a small village and civil parish in the county of North Yorkshire, England, on the outskirts of Scarborough and the southern boundary of the North York Moors National Park.

It consists of a main street adjacent to the only pub, The Downe Arms. It lies around 7 miles (11 km) away from Scarborough. Surrounding villages include East Ayton, West Ayton, Snainton, Hutton Buscel, Brompton and Ruston. It has a cricket ground also which is hidden away in a small turning off the main road. To the north of the village is Wykeham Forest, which covers over 1,114 acres (451 ha).

According to the 2011 UK census, Wykeham parish had a population of 280, a decrease on the 2001 UK census figure of 290. In 2015, North Yorkshire County Council estimated that population had remained static at 280.

From 1974 to 2023 it was part of the Borough of Scarborough. It is now administered by the unitary North Yorkshire Council.

The name Wykeham possibly derives from the Old English wīchām meaning 'village associated with a Roman vicus'.

A nunnery was established to the south-east of Wykeham between 1140 and 1160. The Anglican church in the village is a grade II* listed building. All Saints' Church, Wykeham was built between 1853 and 1855 by William Butterfield. A primary school is tied to the church. Wykeham Church of England Primary School, which has a nominal capacity of 60 pupils, was rated Good by Ofsted in 2016.

Charm Park, a point-to-point racecourse, is close to the village, as are the Wykeham Lakes.

== See also ==
- Listed buildings in Wykeham, Scarborough
- Wykeham railway station
