= Listed buildings in Milton Ernest =

Milton Ernest is a civil parish in Bedford, Bedfordshire, England. It contains 24 listed buildings that are recorded in the National Heritage List for England. Of these, two are listed at Grade I, the highest of the three grades and the others are at Grade II, the lowest grade.

== Key ==
Grade	Criteria
I	Buildings of exceptional interest, sometimes considered to be internationally important
II*	Particularly important buildings of more than special interest
II	Buildings of national importance and special interest

== Buildings ==
Name and location	Photograph	Date	Notes	Grade
House, Formerly Stable Block, at Milton Ernest Hall; 52.19107°N 0.51376°W	—	19th century	A former stable block, immediately north of Milton Ernest Hall, designed by William Butterfield and now partly converted into a private dwelling. The building is arranged in a single storey L-plan, with the east wing now the dwelling. This is constructed from coursed limestone rubble with red brick decorative details and old clay tile roofs. The north range is lower in height, terminating with a storehouse of limestone and red brick dressings with a hipped clay tile roof.	II
Wall to Grounds of Milton Ernest Hall on Eastern Side Bordering A6 Trunk Road; 52.19209°N 0.51039°W	—	1920s-30s	The eastern boundary wall to the grounds of Milton Ernest Hall were constructed by a local craftsman to the design of Sir Albert Richardson. The exterior face is roughly finished in small ashlar blocks, with the interior face partly of common bricks. The wall is topped with moulded coping, and there are square piers with stepped tops either side of the gate entrances.	II
3, Radwell Road; 52.19328°N 0.51282°W	—	17th century	17th century house of coursed limestone rubble and a thatched roof. The property is arranged as a one-storey T-plan.	II
Village Farmhouse; 52.19416°N 0.51644°W	—	1670	A large two storey farmhouse, constructed from coursed limestone rubble, with a modern tile roof. The gable end faces the street, and there is two large central ridge stacks.	II
Manor Farmhouse; 52.19465°N 0.51648°W	—	17th century	The farmhouse is of 17th century origins, but was altered and extended in the 19th century. It consists of two storeys of coursed limestone rubble underneath and old clay tile roof. To the north elevation there is a large external stone stack, and a number of modern extensions.	II
Barn Adjacent to Home Farmhouse; 52.19302°N 0.51147°W		1666	A large threshing barn sited in between Home Farmhouse and The Queens Head Inn, that is constructed of coursed limestone rubble and an old clay tile roof.	II
Forge Cottage; 52.19326°N 0.51135°W	—	18th century	Former smithy of 18th century origin, now a two-storey cottage. Consists of colour washed plaster over a timber frame, with an old clay tile roof and two gable end brick chimney stacks. To the left hand side, there is a small colour washed brick extension also with an old clay tile roof.	II
7, Rushden Road; 52.19386°N 0.51292°W	—	17th century	Large two storey farmhouse, constructed from coursed limestone rubble and a roof of old clay tiles with a substantial brick stack.	II
Barn and Outhouse at Lindham Court; 52.19422°N 0.51224°W	—	17th century	The barn was remodelled and heightened in the 19th century, and consists of coursed limestone rubble with a brick gable apex and banding on the east elevation. A modern clay tile roof tops the single store, and there is a small 17th century outhouse of stone and thatch attached to the east end, forming an L-plan.	II
Manor Farmhouse; 52.19354°N 0.50828°W	—	17th century	A two-storey L-plan in shape, the former farmhouse is of coursed limestone rubble and red brick with an old clay tile roof. The west wing is the earliest section, with the south wing being a 19th-century addition.	II
Radwell Bridge; 52.20446°N 0.53095°W		1806	The bridge was first built in 1766, however it was rebuilt with an additional arch in 1806. It consists of six coursed limestone rubble, round-headed arches. The walls of the bridge are plain parapets, and there is a modern length of footway on the southeast side that is jettied out of the east elevation.	II
Dovecote at Milton Ernest Hall; 52.19079°N 0.51381°W	—	19th century	Situated immediately north of Milton Ernest Hall, the dovecote was designed by William Butterfield, and is built of red brick and an old clay tile roof. It is hexagonal in shape, with a plain wooden door and two light window over. The roof has a hexagonal pigeon entry on the apex, with a wrought iron sundial on top.	II
Stone Cottage; 52.19599°N 0.50877°W	—	1669	The cottage is laid out in three rooms over a single storey, and is constructed of coursed limestone rubble and a modern clay tile roof. There is a modern flat-roofed extension at the rear.	II
13, Radwell Road; 52.19342°N 0.51372°W	—	1859	The house is of a design by William Butterfield, and consists of one storey in red brick with diaper decoration in blue brick. The house has a clay tile roof with two half-hipped side gables. There is also a lean-to porch with a decorated door on the right hand side.	II
Woodlands; 52.19457°N 0.50816°W	—	1694	The Woodlands is a former vicarage, now in use as a private dwelling. It consists of coursed rubble limestone with some ashlar and brick dressings, some brick wallin, and tile hanging. The property has Welsh slate roofs, and red brick neo-Tudor chimney stacks. It is two storeys tall, with the present entrance being through a 19th-century porch. To the rear of the house are brick and limestone stables with slate roofs.	II
25, Radwell Road; 52.19373°N 0.51468°W	—	18th century	18th century built in red brick with a colour washed roughcast front, and an old clay tile roof over the two storeys.	II
Milton Ernest Hall; 52.19045°N 0.51362°W		1858	Large country house designed by William Butterfield, in a confident Gothic Revival design. It is constructed from coursed local limestone rubble with ashlar dressings, red brick arches over the windows, some chequered brick and stone work, and clay tile roofs. The main block is arranged in an L-plan. The interior has been altered, however includes wooden chimney pieces with Gothic detailing and a Gothic tracery to the staircase.	I
Milton Mill; 52.18381°N 0.51096°W	—	Late 18th or early 19th century	The mill is of red brick and a clay tile roof. It is laid out in a T-plan with two storeys, and there is a later two storey extension to the rear elevation. The mill stream runs under the cross-wing, with a Gothic arch over the opening.	II
15, Radwell Road; 52.19356°N 0.51401°W	—	17th century	A coursed limestone rubble house with a timber framed east gable end. A new tile roof tops the two storey L-plan structure.	II
10 and 11, Parkside; 52.19285°N 0.51129°W	—	Late 16th or early 17th century	The original building is laid out in a two-storey L-plan of coursed limestone rubble and an old clay tile roof. A gable wing was later added towards the road on the northeast end, and Sir Albert Richardson later extended this further in the 20th century.	II
Queens Head Public House; 52.19301°N 0.51168°W		18th century	Originally a pair of cottages, they were later converted into a public house. Constructed of colour washed coursed limestone rubble with an old clay tile roof over the two storeys. The original front doors are now blocked up, with a single entrance added into the centre of the road facing elevation.	II
Lindham Court; 52.19441°N 0.51216°W	—	Late 17th to early 18th century	The famhouse is of coursed limestone rubble, with a thatched roof and red brick chimney stacks. The building is L-shaped with two storeys, and modern extensions to the left hand side and right hand front.	II
Parish Church of All Saints; 52.19377°N 0.50910°W		12th century	The building replaces an earlier wooden church on the site, and elements date to the 12th century. It is of coursed limestone rubble construction, and was subject to a restoration in the mid-19th century by William Butterfield. Much of the church is of 14th and 15th century origin, including the font inside.	I
Vertical Spinning Tunnel; 52.19595°N 0.49152°W		1955	A vertical spinning tunnel constructed from pre-formed steel plates in the form of a cylinder, approximately 24.4 metres tall. It's divided into sections by regularly spaces, full-height ribs. On the south side is a cylindrical column containing a lift shaft to the motor room, along with an emergency staircase. Two beams project from the top of the cylinder which act as supports for an external hoist. Inside, the working section of the tunnel is 9 metres high forming a tunnel within a tunnel, and the original electric motor has been replaced in the early 21st century. In between the outer and inner skins of the cylinders are a series of small rooms with various purposes.	II
