= Baldersby St James Primary School =

School building in Baldersby, North Yorkshire, England

Coordinates: 54°11′11″N 1°26′27″W

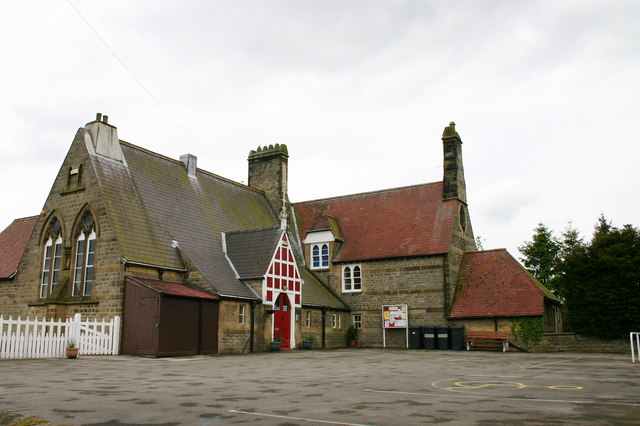
The school, in 2006

Baldersby St James Primary School is a former school in Baldersby St James, a village in North Yorkshire, in England.

The school was commissioned by William Dawnay, 7th Viscount Downe, and designed by William Butterfield. It was completed in 1854, along with an attached schoolhouse. It operated as a primary school until 2022, when it had only 22 pupils. At the time, it was run by the Hope Sentamu Learning Trust, which decided to close it, given that pupil numbers were projected to further decline. The school was placed on the market for £550,000, for community use. The school and schoolhouse were jointly grade II* listed in 1971.

Both the school and house are in stone. The school has a roof of Westmorland slate, and on the house is a tile roof. The school has an L-shaped plan containing two rooms, and a gabled timber-framed porch. In the left gable end of the main hall are two two-light windows, and on the roof are flues in the form of truncated pyramids. The house has a single storey and an attic, and five bays. In the centre is a wooden porch with bargeboards, the flanking windows are three-light sashes with mullions, and above are two-light mullioned windows in half-hipped dormers. Inside is the original wooden staircase, with an open wooden screen at its foot. The boundary wall and gates are Grade II listed.

== See also ==
- Listed buildings in Baldersby
