= The Old Parsonage, Baldersby =

Clergy house in Baldersby, North Yorkshire, England

Coordinates: 54°11′15″N 1°26′22″W

The Old Parsonage is a historic building in Baldersby St James, a village in North Yorkshire, in England.

The house was commissioned by William Dawnay, 7th Viscount Downe, and designed by William Butterfield. It was completed in 1854. The Church Times later described the building as "Gothic architecture... used to express a link with the church... the size of the parsonage reveals the prestige of the parson who inhabited it". It was Grade II* listed in 1971. In 2022, the house was sold for around £1,750,000.

The house is in stone and has a half-hipped tile roof. There are two storeys and an irregular plan. On the entrance front is a slightly projecting gabled wing containing a doorway with a pointed arch, and a window with Geometric tracery. The other ground floor windows are sashes with mullions and ogee and trefoil-headed lights. In the left return is a canted bay window, above which is timber framing and a dormer in a half-hipped gable. Original features include servants' bells. The house has around two acres of grounds, and an indoor swimming pool.

== See also ==
- Listed buildings in Baldersby
