= Hutton Buscel =

Village and civil parish in North Yorkshire, England

Coordinates: 54°14′38″N 0°30′27″W

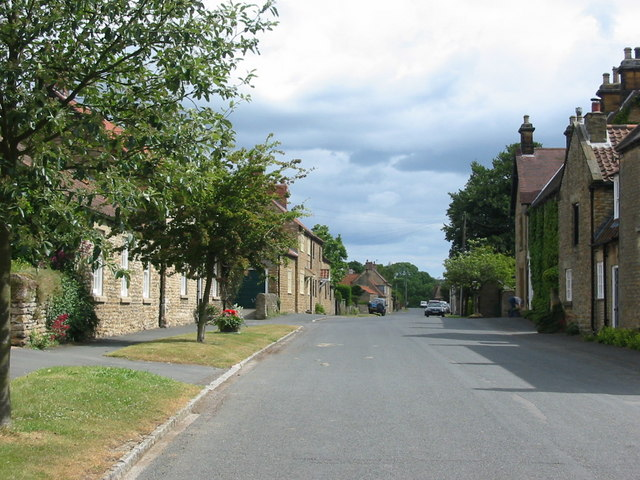
- The main street in Hutton Buscel

- Location within North Yorkshire
- Population: 320 (2011 census)
- OS grid reference: SE974841
- Civil parish: Hutton Buscel
- Unitary authority: North Yorkshire
- Ceremonial county: North Yorkshire
- Region: Yorkshire and the Humber
- Country: England
- Sovereign state: United Kingdom
- Post town: SCARBOROUGH
- Postcode district: YO13
- Police: North Yorkshire
- Fire: North Yorkshire
- Ambulance: Yorkshire
- UK Parliament: Scarborough and Whitby

Hutton Buscel is a village and civil parish in the county of North Yorkshire, England.

According to the 2011 UK census, Hutton Buscel parish had a population of 320, an increase from the 2001 UK census figure of 314.

From 1974 to 2023 it was part of the Borough of Scarborough, it is now administered by the unitary North Yorkshire Council.

== History ==
Hutton-Buscel derives its name from it having been the "High town of the Buscel or Bushel family" whose ancestors arrived following the Norman conquest.

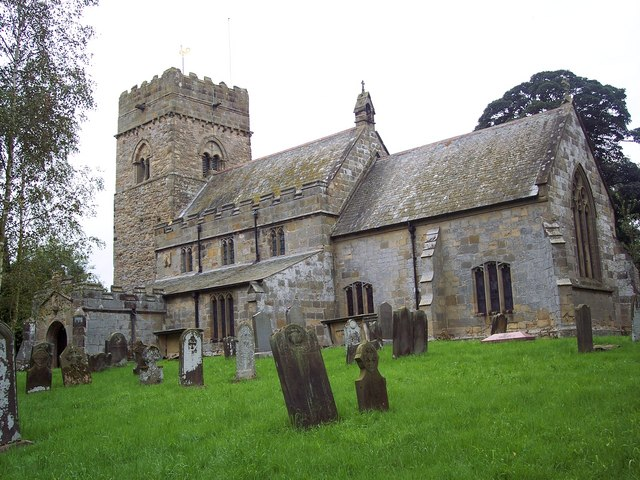
St Matthew's Church

St Matthew's Church, Hutton Buscel is a Grade I listed building. It was built in the 12th century with additions in the 13th and 15th centuries and it underwent restoration by William Butterfield in 1855. Among the monuments in the church is one dedicated to Richard Osbaldeston, Bishop of London, who died in 1764.

Edward Baines, in his 1823 directory, lists the village as Hutton Bushel and gives the population as 419. The manor of Hutton-Buscel was purchased from the Osbaldeston family in 1839, by Marmaduke Langley. By 1848 the population had increased to 506 in the township and 811 in the parish. A school was built in 1854, later converted into Hutton Buscel Village Hall.

== Film appearances ==
The film Smoking/No Smoking is set in Hutton Buscel.

== See also ==
- Listed buildings in Hutton Buscel
