= Listed buildings in Baldersby =

Baldersby is a civil parish in the county of North Yorkshire, England. It contains 28 listed buildings that are recorded in the National Heritage List for England. Of these, two are listed at Grade I, the highest of the three grades, two are at Grade II*, the middle grade, and the others are at Grade II, the lowest grade. The parish contains the villages of Baldersby and Baldersby St James, and the surrounding countryside. A high proportion of the listed buildings in the villages were designed by William Butterfield, and include a church and associated structures, its vicarage and associated buildings, houses, cottages and outbuildings, a bridge, a school, a school house and associated structures. The other listed buildings include a milepost, and two telephone kiosks.

== Key ==
Grade	Criteria
I	Buildings of exceptional interest, sometimes considered to be internationally important
II*	Particularly important buildings of more than special interest
II	Buildings of national importance and special interest

== Buildings ==
Name and location	Photograph	Date	Notes	Grade
Swale Bridge; 54.21262°N 1.44358°W		1781	The bridge, which carries the A61 road over the River Swale was designed by John Carr. It is in stone, and consists of six segmental arches with voussoirs. The central arch is flanked by semicircular cutwaters rising to form pedestrian retreats. The bridge has a band, plain parapets with chamfered copings, and square end piers.	II
The Orchard; 54.20310°N 1.45561°W	—	Mid 19th century	A house in brown brick with a floor band, a cornice and tile roof. There are two storeys and three bays. In the centre is an ornate latticed porch with an ogee lead roof, and a doorway with a surround of large stone blocks and a heavy lintel. Above it is a blind panel, and the windows are sashes in architraves. To the left is a lower two-storey two-bay wing in bands of cobbles and stone, with quoins. In the ground floor is a horizontally-sliding sash window, and above is a casement window.	II
Group of three gravestones, Church of St James; 54.18706°N 1.43957°W	—	Mid 19th century	The three gravestones in the churchyard consist of two curbed graves with headstones, and a coped grave lid. The two headstones each contain a round-head cross with a fleurée cross in relief, and the grave lid has a Latin cross fleurée in relief.	II
Milepost; 54.19390°N 1.45896°W		19th century	The milepost is on the east side of the A61 road, and is in cast iron. It has a triangular plan and a semicircular inscribed headboard. On the upper face is inscribed "WATH R.D.C., and on the sides are arrows and the distances to Thirsk and Ripon.	II
School and School House; 54.18641°N 1.44076°W		1854	The school and master's house were designed by William Butterfield. They are in stone, the school has a roof of Westmorland slate, and on the house is a tile roof. The school has an L-shaped plan, and a gabled timber-framed porch. In the left gable end of the main hall are two two-light windows, and on the roof are flues in the form of truncated pyramids. The house has a single storey and an attic, and five bays. In the centre is a wooden porch with bargeboards, the flanking windows are three-light sashes with mullions, and above are two-light mullioned windows in half-hipped dormers.	II*
Boundary wall and gates, School and School House; 54.18648°N 1.44035°W		c. 1854	The wall and gates were designed by William Butterfield. The wall is in stone with four courses of red brick above, stone coping and buttresses. It is about 1.2 metres (3 ft 11 in) high, and taller on the east side. The gates are wooden with iron fittings, and there are three sets, one double and two single; to the school yard, the school entrance and to School House entrance respectively. Some of the gate posts are original, and are in stone with truncated pyramidal tops.	II
The Old Vicarage; 54.18738°N 1.43937°W	—	1854	The vicarage, later a private house, was designed by William Butterfield. It is in stone and has a half-hipped tile roof. There are two storeys and an irregular plan. On the entrance front is a slightly projecting gabled wing containing a doorway with a pointed arch, and a window with Geometric tracery. The other ground floor windows are sashes with mullions and ogee and trefoil-headed lights. In the left return is a canted bay window, above which is timber framing and a dormer in a half-hipped gable.	II*
Outbuilding north of The Old Vicarage; 54.18753°N 1.43911°W	—	c. 1854	A coach house and stables, later an outbuilding, designed by William Butterfield. It is in stone, with an extension in red brick, and a half-hipped Westmorland slate roof. There is a single storey and a loft, and five bays. It contains doorways and casement windows under segmental arches, and in the loft is a hipped dormer. On the right is a single-storey lean-to with two doorways under segmental arches.	II
Outhouse north of The Old Vicarage; 54.18755°N 1.43934°W	—	c. 1854	A wash house, fuel store, pigsty and privy, later an outhouse, designed by William Butterfield. It is in stone, with brick at the rear, and a Westmorland slate roof with a tile ridge. There is a single storey, and a lean-to at the rear. The building contains doorways, windows of differing types, and slit vents.	II
1 and 2 The Cottages; 54.18707°N 1.44211°W	—	c. 1855	A pair of houses designed by William Butterfield, in red brick with a half-hipped tile roof. There are two storeys and an irregular plan, with the entrances on the sides. The windows are casements, in the ground floor they have segmental brick arches, and in the upper floor they rise as half-hipped dormers.	II
3 and 4 The Cottages; 54.18727°N 1.44178°W	—	c. 1855	A pair of houses designed by William Butterfield, in red brick with a tile roof. There are two storeys and an irregular plan, and a single-storey bay on the right. On the left is a porch with a hipped roof and buttresses, and the other entrance is in the right return. The windows are casements, in the ground floor most have segmental brick arches, and in the upper floor they rise as half-hipped dormers.	II
Outbuilding southwest of 3 The Cottages; 54.18726°N 1.44204°W	—	c. 1855	A wash house, later an outbuilding, designed by William Butterfield. It is in red brick with a tile roof, and has one storey. The building contains a doorway, casement windows and a louvred opening.	II
Boundary wall, 1, 2, 5, 6 and 7 Wide Howe Lane; 54.18690°N 1.44190°W	—	c. 1855	The boundary wall running along the front of the gardens was designed by William Butterfield. It is in red brick with pointed coping of cement over stone, to resemble stone. The wall is buttressed at the gateways, and its height varies being about 80 centimetres (31 in).	II
East View, South View and West View; 54.18704°N 1.44148°W		c. 1855	A group of three houses designed by William Butterfield. They are in red brick with stone dressings, and half-hipped tile roofs. There are two storeys, and they form an L-shaped plan, with three porches. The windows are either three-light casements with pointed heads and stone mullions, or small-paned casements. Two upper floor windows rise as half-hipped dormers.	II
Lilac Cottage and Tudor Cottage; 54.18665°N 1.44150°W	—	c. 1855	A pair of houses designed by William Butterfield in red brick, with timber framing, stone dressings and bands, and a hipped tile roof. There is a single storey and an irregular front. To the left is a gabled bay containing a mullioned and transomed window, with a gabled porch at right angles to its left. Two bays on the front project, and are gabled with bargeboards, they contain cross windows rising as half-dormers, and the other windows are small casements.	II
Boundary wall, Lilac Cottage and Tudor Cottage; 54.18676°N 1.44126°W	—	c. 1855	The boundary wall enclosing the garden was designed by William Butterfield. It is in red brick with pointed coping in blue engineering bricks, and has an overall height of 75 centimetres (30 in).	II
Church of St James; 54.18711°N 1.44032°W		1856–58	The church was designed by William Butterfield, and is built in stone, with roofs of lead on the north aisle and vestry, and red tile elsewhere. It consists of a nave with a clerestory, north and south aisles, a lower chancel, a north vestry, and a steeple at the west end to the south of the south aisle. The steeple has a tower with three stages, and a spire with decorated bands and lucarnes.	I
Churchyard cross, Church of St James; 54.18688°N 1.44020°W		1856–58	The cross in the churchyard was designed by William Butterfield. It is in stone and consists of a fleurée cross with central boss and pierced arms. It has an octagonal shaft on a square two-stage plinth with sunk quatrefoil and cinquefoil panels.	II
Lych gate, Church of St James; 54.18676°N 1.44048°W		1856–58	The lychgate at the entrance to the churchyard was designed by William Butterfield. The side walls are in stone with brick bands, there are buttresses, wooden gates and a pyramidal tile roof. The archway and roof structure are in wood, the entrance is divided into two arches by posts on stylobates, the left arch is taller and wider with tracery in the spandrels.	I
Wall and gate, Church of St James; 54.18669°N 1.44011°W	—	1856–58	The wall enclosing the churchyard was designed by William Butterfield. It is in stone with four courses of red brick above, and has stone coping and buttresses. The wall contains a wooden gate at the southeast corner, with long and short vertical bars, and the tops are finished with hollow chamfers. There are strap hinges with trefoil ends, and an iron handle and latch.	II
Appletree Cottage, Elm Tree Cottage and Village Farmhouse; 54.20200°N 1.45595°W		c. 1859	A block of three houses designed by William Butterfield in red brick, with stone dressings, a sill band and a half-hipped tile roof. There are two storeys and four bays. On the front is a gabled timber porch, and the ground floor windows are casements with three lights and mullions. In the middle of the upper floor is a timber-framed panel rising to a half-hipped dormer, in the outer bays are gabled dormers, and all have casements. The other entrances are in the gable ends.	II
Wall and gate piers, Appletree Cottage, Elm Tree Cottage and Village Farmhouse; 54.20190°N 1.45607°W	—	c. 1859	The wall enclosing the garden was designed by William Butterfield. It is in polychrome stone, with courses of brick and stone coping. The gate piers are low, in brick with stone bands, and have pointed coping.	II
The Post Office; 54.20222°N 1.45630°W	—	c. 1859	The house, at one time a post office, was designed by William Butterfield. It is in red brick with a tile roof, two storeys and two bays. On the front, the right bay contains a shop window, a doorway to the right, and above is diapering in blue brick. The left bay is gabled, and contains a casement window in each floor, both with a segmental relieving arch in blue brick. In the left return is a gabled porch, casement windows, and a hipped dormer.	II
The Hill; 54.19999°N 1.45724°W	—	1860	A house designed by William Butterfield, in red brick with blue brick diapering, stone dressings and bands, and a tile roof. There are two storeys and an irregular plan. On the entrance front, the left bay is recessed, and contains a porch with a Gothic arch, the surround in blue brick and stone. The mullions, have been removed from the ground floor windows, and in the upper floor is a three-light sash window rising as a half-hipped dormer.	II
Gate posts and gate, The Hill; 54.20009°N 1.45753°W	—	c. 1860	The gate and gate posts were designed by William Butterfield, and are in wood. The gate is about 1.5 metres (4 ft 11 in) high, and has alternate long and short bars, with horizontal and diagonal rails behind, and strap hinges of iron. The gate posts are square and have chamfered tops.	II
Outbuildings, The Hill; 54.20012°N 1.45720°W	—	c. 1860	Offices and stables, later an outbuilding, designed by William Butterfield. It is in red brick, with diapering and bands in blue brick, and a tile roof. There is one story and a loft, and three bays. The doorway has a plain surround under a segmental relieving arch, there is a sash window, and a slightly projecting bay with a ventilator window and double doors above.	II
Telephone kiosk, Baldersby; 54.20223°N 1.45619°W	—	1935	The K6 type telephone kiosk was designed by Giles Gilbert Scott. Constructed in cast iron with a square plan and a dome, it has three unperforated crowns in the top panels.	II
Telephone kiosk, Baldersby St James; 54.18685°N 1.44209°W	—	1935	The K6 type telephone kiosk was designed by Giles Gilbert Scott. Constructed in cast iron with a square plan and a dome, it has three unperforated crowns in the top panels.	II
