= William Dawnay =

William Dawnay may refer to:

- William Dawnay, 7th Viscount Downe, British politician
- William Dawnay, 6th Viscount Downe, English clergyman and Irish peer
