= Listed buildings in Hutton Buscel =

Hutton Buscel is a civil parish in the county of North Yorkshire, England. It contains 17 listed buildings that are recorded in the National Heritage List for England. Of these, one is listed at Grade I, the highest of the three grades, and the others are at Grade II, the lowest grade. The parish contains the village of Hutton Buscel and the surrounding area, and all the listed buildings are in the village. Most of these are houses, outbuildings and farmhouses, and the others include a church, a churchyard cross, a pinfold, and a village hall.

== Key ==
Grade	Criteria
I	Buildings of exceptional interest, sometimes considered to be internationally important
II	Buildings of national importance and special interest

== Buildings ==
Name and location	Photograph	Date	Notes	Grade
St Matthew's Church; 54.24285°N 0.50890°W		12th century	The church has been altered and extended through the centuries, and in 1855 it was restored and the north aisle was rebuilt by William Butterfield. The church is built in sandstone with roofs of slate and stone flags. It consists of a nave with a clerestory, north and south aisles, a south porch, a chancel, and a west tower. The tower has three stages, a plinth, narrow round-arched lights, and paired round-arched bell openings with hood moulds, above which is a chamfered string course, a corbel table, and an embattled parapet. There are also embattled parapets on the aisles and the porch. The porch is gabled, and has a round-arched doorway, over which is a small canopied niche.	I
Churchyard cross 54.24273°N 0.50878°W		Medieval	The cross in the churchyard to the south of the church is in limestone, and is 5 metres (16 ft) high. The shaft is chamfered on an octagonal base, and on the top is a 19th-century cross with bifurcated arms.	II
Martin Garth; 54.24293°N 0.51072°W	—	Early 17th century	The house has a cruck framed core, it is encased in limestone, and has sandstone dressings, quoins and a pantile roof. There are two storeys and attics, and three bays. The doorway has a chamfered and quoined surround, and a roughly-arched lintel. The windows are casements, and in the attic are dormers. In the left gable wall is a blocked mullioned window.	II
Outbuilding north of Cairnsmore; 54.24414°N 0.50779°W	—	Early 18th century	The outbuilding has a cruck framed core, it is encased in sandstone, and has a pantile roof. There is a single storey and a loft, and three bays. It contains a doorway and small fixed-light windows. Inside, there are three pairs of raised crossed-apex crucks with collars.	II
Pasture Cottage; 54.24553°N 0.50429°W	—	Early 18th century	The house has a cruck framed core, it is encased in sandstone, and has a pantile roof. There is a single storey and an attic, and three bays. The entrance is at the rear, most of the windows are horizontally-sliding sashes, and there is a fire window and flat-topped dormer.	II
The Forge and outbuildings 54.24474°N 0.50710°W	—	Early 18th century	A house, outbuildings and a forge, later combined into a house, it is in sandstone with limestone quoins and a pantile roof. There are two low storeys and three bays, and at the rear is a single-storey outshut with the former forge beyond. The doorway has a divided fanlight, and the windows are horizontally-sliding sashes. All the openings have thin timber lintels.	II
Home Farmhouse; 54.24391°N 0.50732°W		Early to mid 18th century	The farmhouse is in sandstone, with limestone quoins, a pantile roof and two storeys. On the front is a doorway and horizontally-sliding sash windows, and all the openings have thin timber lintels.	II
Bay Nigg; 54.24520°N 0.50528°W		Mid 18th century	The house is in rendered sandstone, with quoins, and a pantile roof with coped gables and shaped kneelers. There are two storeys, two bays and a rear extension. The doorway is in the centre, it is flanked by bow windows, the upper floor contains casement windows, and all the openings have lintels and keystones.	II
Church Lane Cottage; 54.24384°N 0.50748°W		Mid 18th century	The house is in rendered sandstone, with quoins, and a pantile roof with coped gables and shaped kneelers. There are two storeys, three bays, and a rear extension. The doorway is in the centre, the windows are horizontally-sliding sashes, and all the openings have lintels and tripartite keystones.	II
Pinfold; 54.24492°N 0.51118°W		18th century	The pinfold is in limestone and has a circular plan, The wall is about 1.7 metres (5 ft 7 in) high, it has transverse shaped coping stones, and there is a gate to the lane.	II
The Old Road House; 54.24417°N 0.50692°W	—	Mid to late 18th century	An inn, later a private house, in sandstone, with quoins, and an M-shaped slate roof. There are two storeys and an L-shaped plan, with a front range of three bays, a single-storey extension to the left, and a rear extension. In the centre of the main range is a doorway with a cornice hood, and there is a doorway in the extension. The windows in the main range are sashes with tripartite lintels, and in the extension are casements.	II
The Holt; 54.24362°N 0.50931°W		Late 18th century	A vicarage, later extended at the rear and used for other purposes, it is in sandstone on a plinth, with raised and chamfered quoins, and a slate roof with coped gables and shaped kneelers. There are two storeys and an attic, and three bays. In the right bay is a doorway with a patterned fanlight in a splayed architrave. The windows have raised surrounds and keystones, and in the attic are two gabled dormers with bargeboards. On the left front is a glazed porch with a cornice, and in the right return is a staircase window with a keystone.	II
West End Farmhouse; 54.24204°N 0.51224°W	—	Late 18th century	The farmhouse, which was extended to the left in 1844, is in sandstone with quoins, and a pantile roof with coped gables and shaped kneelers. There are two storeys, and the original part and the extensions each have two bays. On the front is a doorway, the windows are sashes, and the openings in the original part have keystones. In the left part is a datestone.	II
The Kennels; 54.24827°N 0.50546°W	—	1806	A row of hunt kennels converted into a house, in sandstone with quoins, a moulded eaves course, and a pantile roof. There are two storeys and five bays, the middle bay projecting and gabled, and a single-storey lean-to on the right. In the middle bay is a doorway with a corbelled pediment hood, and a sash window to the right, above which is an oculus, and a datestone with a crest. The windows elsewhere are sashes, those in the ground floor with keystones, and recessed panels between.	II
Manor Farmhouse; 54.24403°N 0.50901°W	—	Early 19th century	The farmhouse is in sandstone, with a stepped eaves course, and a pantile roof with coped gables and kneelers carved as scrolls. There are two storeys, a double depth plan, three bays, and a rear wing. The doorway is approached by steps and has pilasters and a cornice, and the windows are sashes.	II
Mount Pleasant Farmhouse; 54.24781°N 0.50009°W	—	Early 19th century	The farmhouse is in limestone, and has slate roofs with coped gables and shaped kneelers. There are two storeys and three bays, and a lower single-bay wing on the right. On the front is a glazed porch and a doorway, and another doorway to the right with a fanlight. The windows are sashes with wedge lintels and keystones.	II
Village Hall and house 54.24296°N 0.50937°W		1854	A school and schoolhouse designed by William Butterfield, and later used for other purposes, it is in sandstone with quoins and a slate roof. There is an L-shaped plan, and to the left is a single-storey two-house. To the right is the school, with a massive external chimney stack to the right. The garden front has one storey and an attic, and four bays. It contains a mullioned and transomed window, sash windows, and two half-dormers.	II
