= St Matthew's Church, Hutton Buscel =

Church in Hutton Buscel, North Yorkshire, England

Coordinates: 54°14′34″N 0°30′32″W

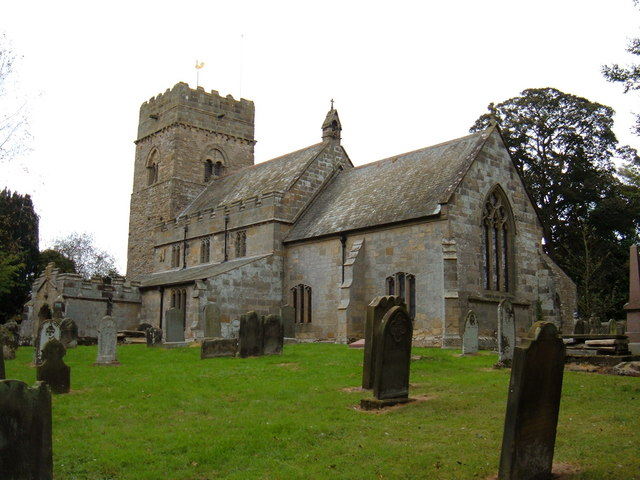
The church, in 2009

St Matthew's Church is the parish church of Hutton Buscel, a village in North Yorkshire, in England.

The oldest section of the church is the tower, which was built in about 1180. The nave dates from the 13th century, while the chancel, clerestory, south aisle, porch, and parapet are all 15th century. It was restored in 1855 by William Butterfield, the work including rebuilding the north aisle. The church was grade I listed in 1967.

The church is built of sandstone with roofs of slate and stone flags. It consists of a nave with a clerestory, north and south aisles, a south porch, a chancel, and a west tower. The tower has three stages, a plinth, narrow round-arched lights, and paired round-arched bell openings with hood moulds, above which is a chamfered string course, a corbel table, and an embattled parapet. There are also embattled parapets on the aisles and the porch. The porch is gabled, and has a round-arched doorway, over which is a small canopied niche. Inside, there is an octagonal pulpit with Jacobean carved panels, an octagonal font designed by Butterfield, and some 18th-century monuments.

== See also ==
- Grade I listed buildings in North Yorkshire (district)
- Listed buildings in Hutton Buscel
