= Golden Lion Hotel, Hunstanton =

Golden Lion Hotel
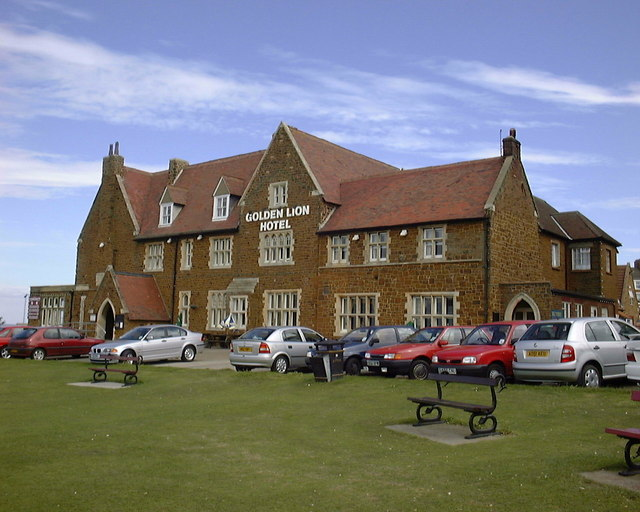

- Norfolk

General information
- Location: Hunstanton, King's Lynn and West Norfolk, Norfolk, England, Cliff Parade; Hunstanton; Norfolk; PE36 6BQ
- Coordinates: 52°56′25.17″N 0°29′18.10″E
- Opening: 1850

Design and construction
- Architect: William Butterfield

Other information
- Number of rooms: 27 en-suite bedrooms
- Number of restaurants: 1
- Number of bars: 1 (The Lion Bar)
- Parking: Yes

Website

Listed Building – Grade II
- Designated: 20 September 1984
- Reference no.: 1342241

The Golden Lion Hotel is in the coastal English town of Hunstanton, King's Lynn and West Norfolk, Norfolk, England. It is a three-star hotel and has been a Grade II listed building since 20 September 1984.

== Location ==
The hotel stands in a prominent position on the landward side of Cliff Parade overlooking the Green. It has wide panoramic views of the sea and Hunstanton's main beach.

== History ==
The area in which this hotel stands was conceived as New Hunstanton and was the brain child of Henry Le Strange of Hunstanton Hall. Le Strange wanted Hunstanton to develop as a sea-side resort with the expected arrival of the railway, which finally arrived in 1862. Le Strange's son Hamon controlled the later part of the scheme, and he employed several London architects to bring his father's plans to realization. One of those architects was William Butterfield, who had a hand in redeveloping the original New Inn into the Golden Lion Hotel.

== Description ==
The building seen today is built from the local carrstone, which is laid in a random coursed manner around the doorways and windows are dressed with stone quoins and mullions in the high Victorian Tudor Gothic style. The building is set on an L-shaped ground floor plan.
