= Baldersby =

Village and civil parish in North Yorkshire, England

Coordinates: 54.201°N 1.456°W

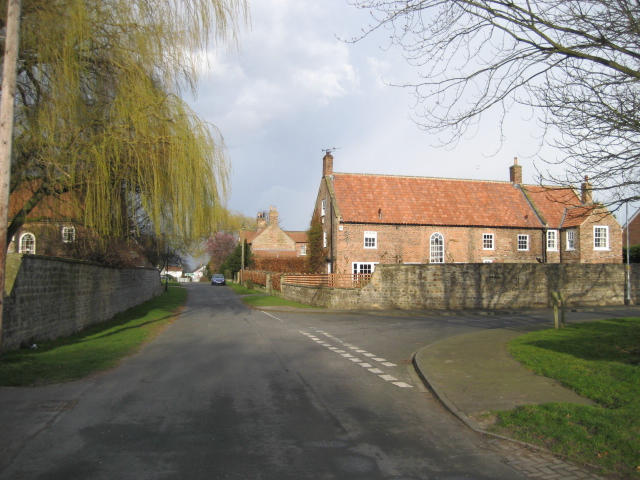
- Baldersby village

- Location within North Yorkshire
- Population: 285 (2011 Census)
- OS grid reference: SE 355 785
- Unitary authority: North Yorkshire
- Region: Yorkshire and the Humber
- Country: England
- Sovereign state: United Kingdom
- Post town: THIRSK
- Postcode district: YO7
- Police: North Yorkshire
- Fire: North Yorkshire
- Ambulance: Yorkshire

Baldersby is a village and civil parish in North Yorkshire, England, about 6 miles (10 km) west of Thirsk and 5 miles (8 km) north-east of Ripon on the A61. The parish includes the village of Baldersby St James, 1 mile (2 km) south-east of the village of Baldersby, but not Baldersby Park, which is in the parish of Rainton with Newby. According to the 2001 census the parish had a population of 253, increasing to 285 at the 2011 census.

Baldersby has a farm shop, an Anglican Mission Room, and a cricket ground with a pavilion and children's play area. The nearest primary school is Baldersby St. James C of E Primary School in nearby Baldersby St James.

== Geography ==
The Roman road Dere Street forms the western boundary of the parish, now followed by the A1(M) motorway. Baldersby Gate Interchange, Junction 50 of the A1(M), connects the A61 to the A1(M) in the south of the parish.

The Baldersby Junction Improvement was constructed to remove the A61 roundabout in 1986, to finish around October 1987. The bridge opened around early December 1986.

== Etymology ==
The name Baldersby may be derived from that of the Norse god, Balder, though more probably it is from a personal name Baldhere (-by = homestead) and indicates that the area of the village may once have been a Viking settlement. The village appears in the Domesday Book of 1086 as Baldrebi and in the early 13th century as Baldeby.

== History ==
At the time of the Domesday Book Baldersby was held by Count Alan of Brittany. It later passed to Fountains Abbey. From the 17th to the 19th centuries the manor formed part of the estates of the Dukes of Devonshire.

Baldersby was historically a township in the parish of Topcliffe in the North Riding of Yorkshire. The township became a separate civil parish in 1866, and in 1974 was transferred to the new county of North Yorkshire. From 1974 to 2023 it was part of the Hambleton District, it is now administered by the unitary North Yorkshire Council.

Between 1848 and 1959 the village was served by Baldersby railway station.

== See also ==
- Listed buildings in Baldersby
