= Alfington =

Village in Devon, England

Coordinates: 50.77°N 03.26°W

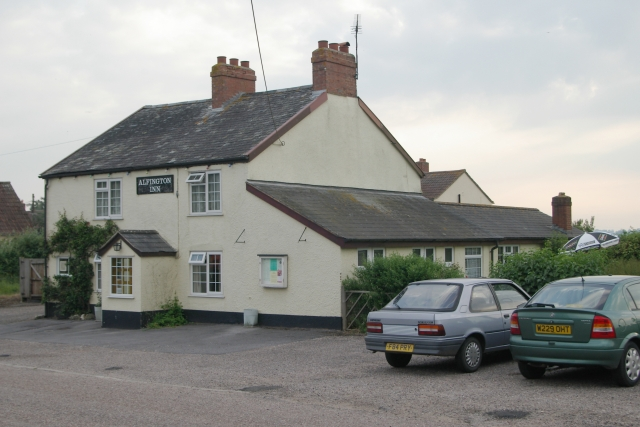
- The Alfington Inn

- Location within Devon
- OS grid reference: SY1198
- Civil parish: Ottery St Mary
- District: East Devon
- Shire county: Devon
- Region: South West
- Country: England
- Sovereign state: United Kingdom
- Post town: OTTERY ST. MARY
- Postcode district: EX11
- Dialling code: 01404
- Police: Devon and Cornwall
- Fire: Devon and Somerset
- Ambulance: South Western
- UK Parliament: Honiton and Sidmouth

Alfington is a village in the civil parish of Ottery St Mary, in the East Devon district, in Devon, England, on the River Otter. It is 2 miles (3 km) north-east of Ottery St Mary.

The church of St James (Church of England) was built of brick in the Early English style in 1849–52 to designs by the architect William Butterfield.
