= Church of St James, Baldersby =

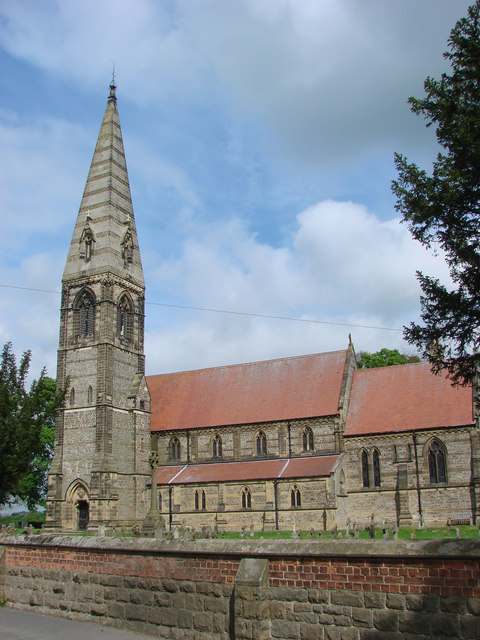
- Church of St James, Baldersby
- 54.1871°N 1.4403°W
- OS grid reference: SE 36623 76957
- Location: Wide Howe Lane, Baldersby St James, North Yorkshire, YO7 4PT
- Country: England
- Denomination: Church of England

History
- Status: Active
- Dedication: St James the Greater

Architecture
- Functional status: Parish church
- Heritage designation: Grade I listed
- Architect: William Butterfield

Administration
- Diocese: Diocese of York
- Archdeaconry: Archdeaconry of Cleveland
- Deanery: Mowbray
- Parish: Baldersby with Dishforth

Clergy
- Vicar: Vacant

The Church of St James is a Church of England parish church in Baldersby St James, North Yorkshire. This Victorian church is a Grade I listed building and was designed by William Butterfield.

== History ==
The lych gate

St James' was built between 1856 and 1858, and was designed by William Butterfield. It had been commissioned by William Dawnay, 7th Viscount Downe. It is made of snecked stone with ashlar details and has a red tile roof. It is High Victorian in style. The church consists of a west tower, a five-bay aisled nave, a south porch, and a two-bay unaisled chancel.

The grounds of the church and its churchyard measure 1.38 acres. The wall of the churchyard is itself a Grade II listed structure. The church has a lych gate which is Grade I listed. The church itself was designated a grade I listed building on 26 May 1971.

=== Present day ===
The parish of Baldersby with Dishforth is in the Archdeaconry of Cleveland of the Diocese of York.

== Notable burials ==
The burials in the churchyard date from 1857 and include the following:

- The Revd George Boddy, former vicar of St James'
- John Brennand, High Sheriff of Yorkshire from 1915 to 1916, and his wife
- William Dawnay, 7th Viscount Downe (1812–1857), and his wife, and her second husband
- The Revd Thomas Foulkes, former vicar of St James'
- The Revd Brian Johnson, former vicar of St James'
- The Revd Zechariah Jones, former vicar of St James'

== See also ==
- Grade I listed buildings in North Yorkshire (district)
- Listed buildings in Baldersby
