= Baldersby St James =

Village in North Yorkshire, England

Coordinates: 54°11′13″N 1°26′25″W

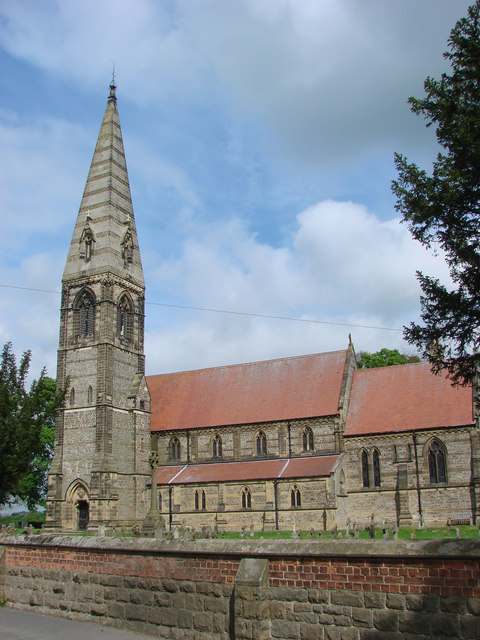
- Baldersby St. James Church

- Location within North Yorkshire
- OS grid reference: SE365769
- Civil parish: Baldersby
- Unitary authority: North Yorkshire
- Ceremonial county: North Yorkshire
- Region: Yorkshire and the Humber
- Country: England
- Sovereign state: United Kingdom
- Police: North Yorkshire
- Fire: North Yorkshire
- Ambulance: Yorkshire

Baldersby St James is a village in the county of North Yorkshire, England. From 1974 to 2023 it was part of the Borough of Harrogate. It is now administered by the unitary North Yorkshire Council.

Several notable buildings in the village were commissioned by Viscount Downe of Baldersby Park and designed by William Butterfield in the 1850s. The Church of St James and its lychgate are both Grade I listed, and The Old Parsonage and the former Baldersby St James Primary School are both Grade II* listed.

== See also ==
- Listed buildings in Baldersby
