= Hutton Buscel Village Hall =

Building in Hutton Buscel, North Yorkshire, England

Coordinates: 54°14′35″N 0°30′34″W

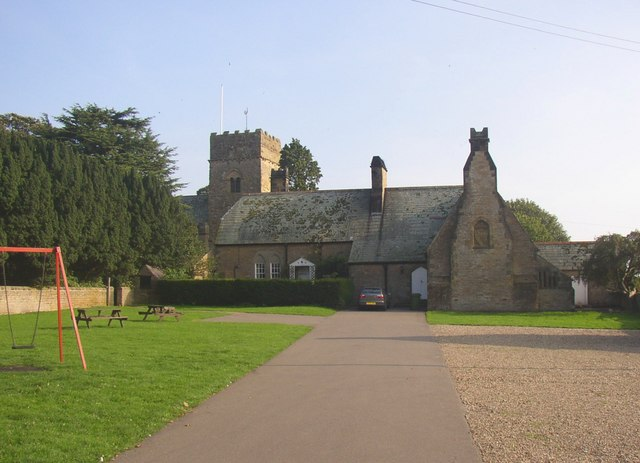
The hall, in 2006

Hutton Buscel Village Hall is a historic building in Hutton Buscel, a village in North Yorkshire, in England.

The building was constructed in 1854 as the village school, with an adjoining house. It was almost certaintly designed by William Butterfield, as it resembles schools he designed in Wykeham. It was grade II listed in 1987. In 2002, it was converted to serve as the village hall.

The building is constructed of sandstone with quoins and a slate roof. It has an L-shaped plan, and to the left is a single-storey two-house. To the right is the school, with a massive external chimney stack to the right. The garden front has one storey and an attic, and four bays. It contains a mullioned and transomed window, sash windows, and two half-dormers.

== See also ==
- Listed buildings in Hutton Buscel
