= St James and St Anne's Church, Alfington =

Church of England church

St James' and St Anne's Church
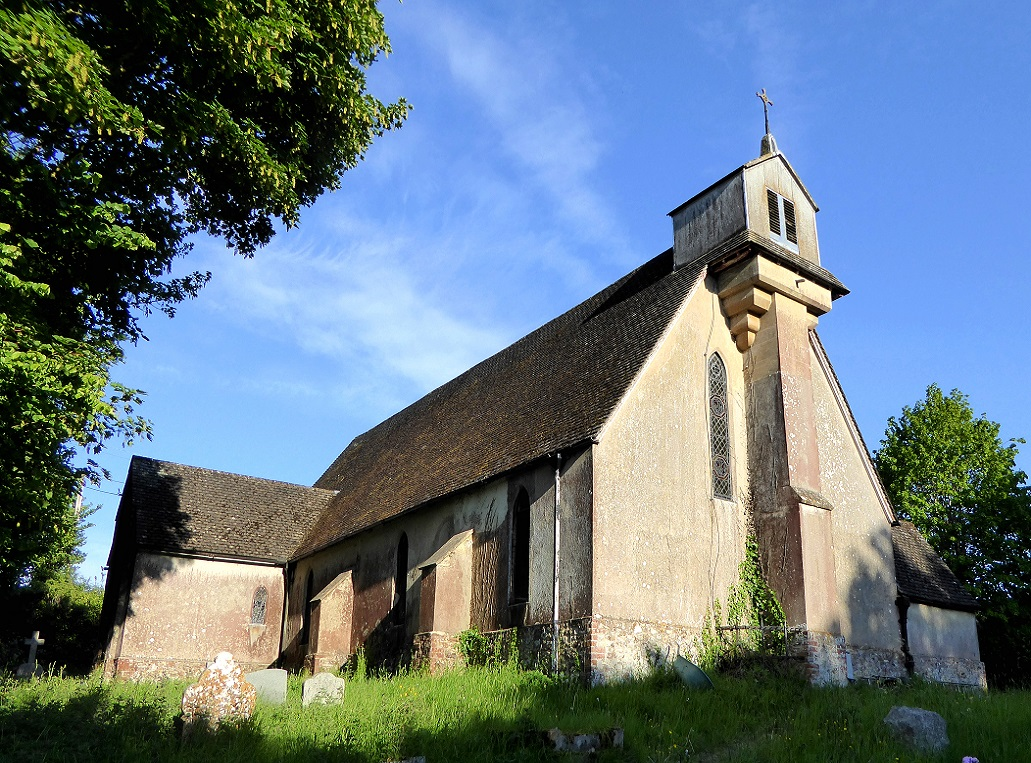

Religion
- Affiliation: Church of England
- Ecclesiastical or organizational status: Active
- Year consecrated: 1882

Location
- Location: Alfington, Devon, England
- Interactive map of St James' and St Anne's Church
- Coordinates: 50.7749°N 3.2589°W

Architecture
- Architect: William Butterfield
- Type: Church
- Completed: 1849

St James' and St Anne's Church is a Church of England church in Alfington, Devon, England. It was built in 1849 at the expense of Sir John Taylor Coleridge and designed by William Butterfield.

The church became Grade II listed in 1952. Historic England describes it as a "relatively early" work from Butterfield and "modest" compared to his more elaborate designs from the same period, such as All Saints' Church in London. The exterior is considered "unusual in its austerity and singular treatment of the belfry".

== History ==
St James' and St Anne's Church was erected in 1849 and maintained at the expense of Sir John Taylor Coleridge as a chapel-of-ease for the residents of Alfington, who had previously been required to travel to the parish church of Ottery St Mary. Coleridge commissioned William Butterfield to design the church, who at the time was working on the restoration of the parish church at Ottery St Mary. Coleridge would also have a parsonage and school constructed for the village, both of which were designed by Butterfield.

A burial ground was added to the church in 1876 and consecrated on 29 September that year, followed by the addition of a vestry in 1882. Alfington became its own parish in 1882, which prompted Coleridge's son to hand the church over to the Ecclesiastical Commissioners, who agreed to provide an endowment of £150 a year. A consecration service was performed on 29 September 1882 by the Bishop of Exeter, Frederick Temple, with the assistance of the Bishop of Ely, James Woodford.

== Architecture ==
The church is built in an Early English style using roughcast rendered brick. The roof is of clay tiles and features a bell turret. The inside, which was built to accommodate approximately 200 persons, contains a nave, chancel, south-west porch and vestry. The octagonal font is of Devonshire marble. There are a number of memorials to the Coleridge family inside the church, while another noteworthy feature is the east window, designed by Augustus Pugin and installed in 1852 by Hardman & Co. of Birmingham. A lychgate to the church grounds is dated 1897.
