= Milton Ernest Hall =

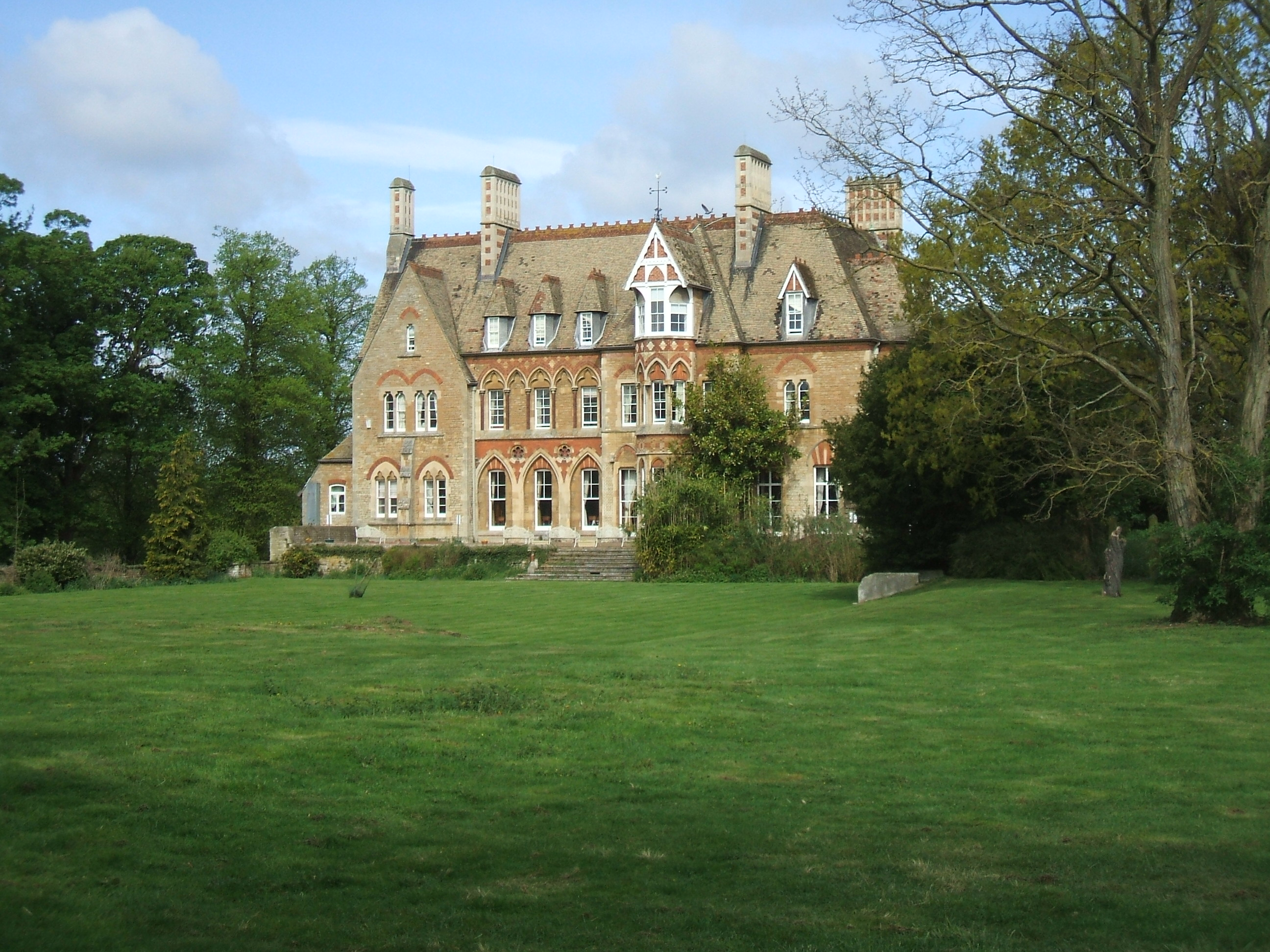

- Location within Bedfordshire

General information
- Architectural style: Gothic Revival
- Location: Milton Ernest, Bedfordshire
- Coordinates: 52°11′25.800″N 0°30′49.046″W
- Ordnance Survey: TL0170455731
- Year built: 1853–58
- Client: Benjamin Helps Starey

Design and construction
- Architect: William Butterfield
- Designations: Grade I

Milton Ernest Hall is a large grade I listed country house in the village of Milton Ernest, Bedfordshire, England. It now serves as a nursing home.

== History ==
The hall was built in 1853–58 for Benjamin Helps Starey on the site of a decaying earlier house by church architect William Butterfield, whose sister Ann was married to Starey. Constructed in limestone in a Gothic Revival style, the main block is L-shaped with projecting gables and a high, steep roof containing several dormer windows.

The property passed then through several hands before being sold in 1906 to Lord Ampthill. During the First World War the hall became the home of two of the sons of King George V. After the war it was restored to the Starey family.

During the Second World War the hall was used as a base for Special Operations Executive, a small grass landing strip being laid in the grounds. In 1944 it became the United States Eighth Air Force's support command headquarters. A plaque at the Hall honours the members of the United States Eighth Air Force (including Major Glenn Miller) who were stationed there. The plaque reads:

In memory of all the personnel who served in World War II at Milton Ernest Hall Headquarters USAAF Eighth Air Force Service Command Station 608 1943-1946, Also Major Glenn Miller & the Band of the Allied Expeditionary Force who were stationed here from July to December 1944

After the US Air Force vacated the Hall, it remained empty until 1968, when Ludwik Dobrzański (he died in 1990) purchased the property along with the surrounding grounds for £15,000. The family lived at the Hall until it was sold in 1971.

In 1984 the hall was converted to a nursing home.

In the fields adjoining is a grade II listed brick and tile hexagonal dove-cote.

== Early residents ==
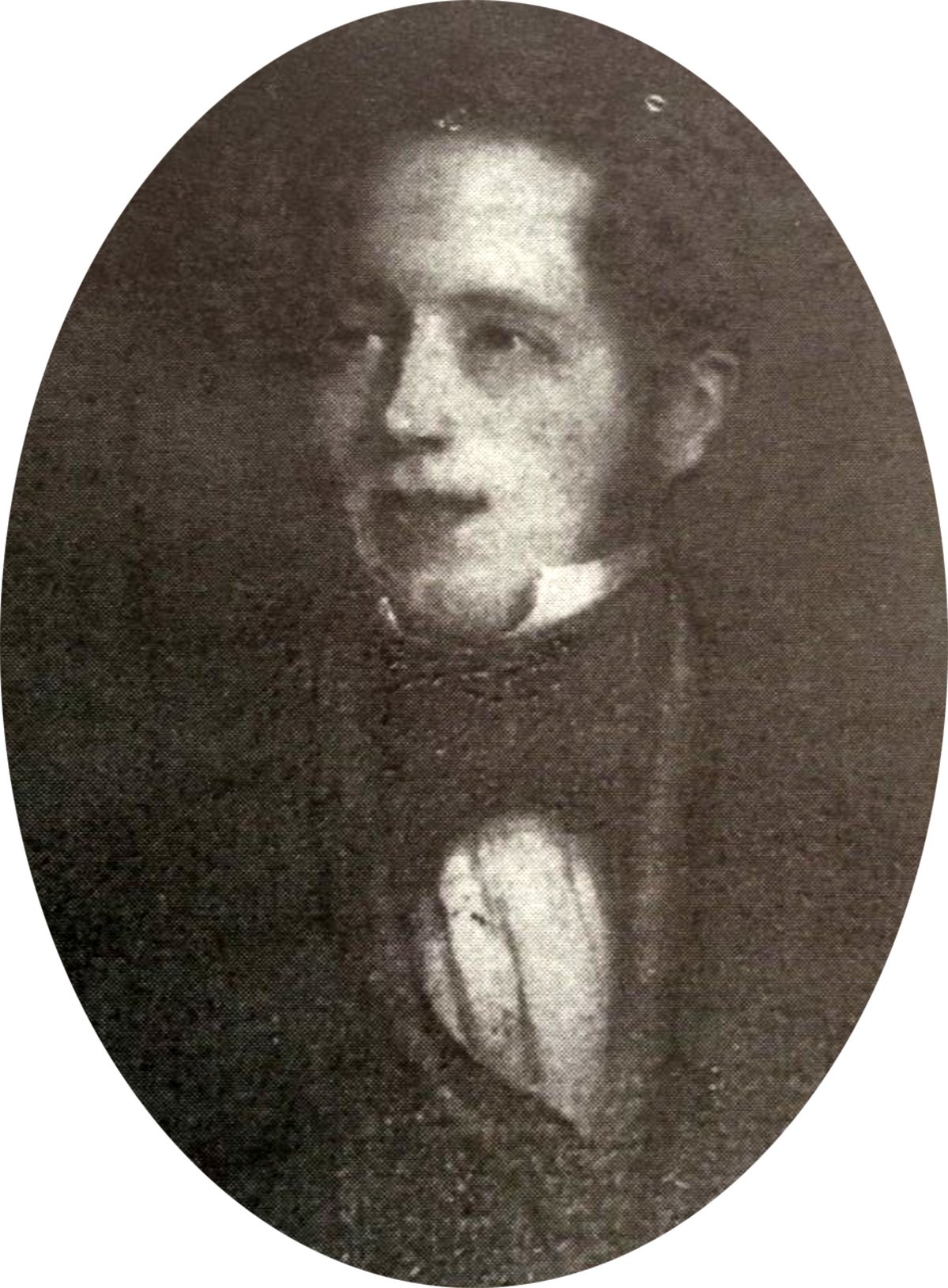
Benjamin Helps Starey

Benjamin Helps Starey (1807–1874) who built Milton Ernest Hall in 1856 was a wealthy London merchant. In 1838 he married Anne Humphreys Butterfield (1813–1891) who was the sister of the famous architect William Butterfield (1814–1900). The couple had nine children all of whom were raised at Milton Ernest Hall. William Butterfield was a bachelor and as he was very close to his sister Anne the Starey family provided him with a stable family environment and he often stayed with them.

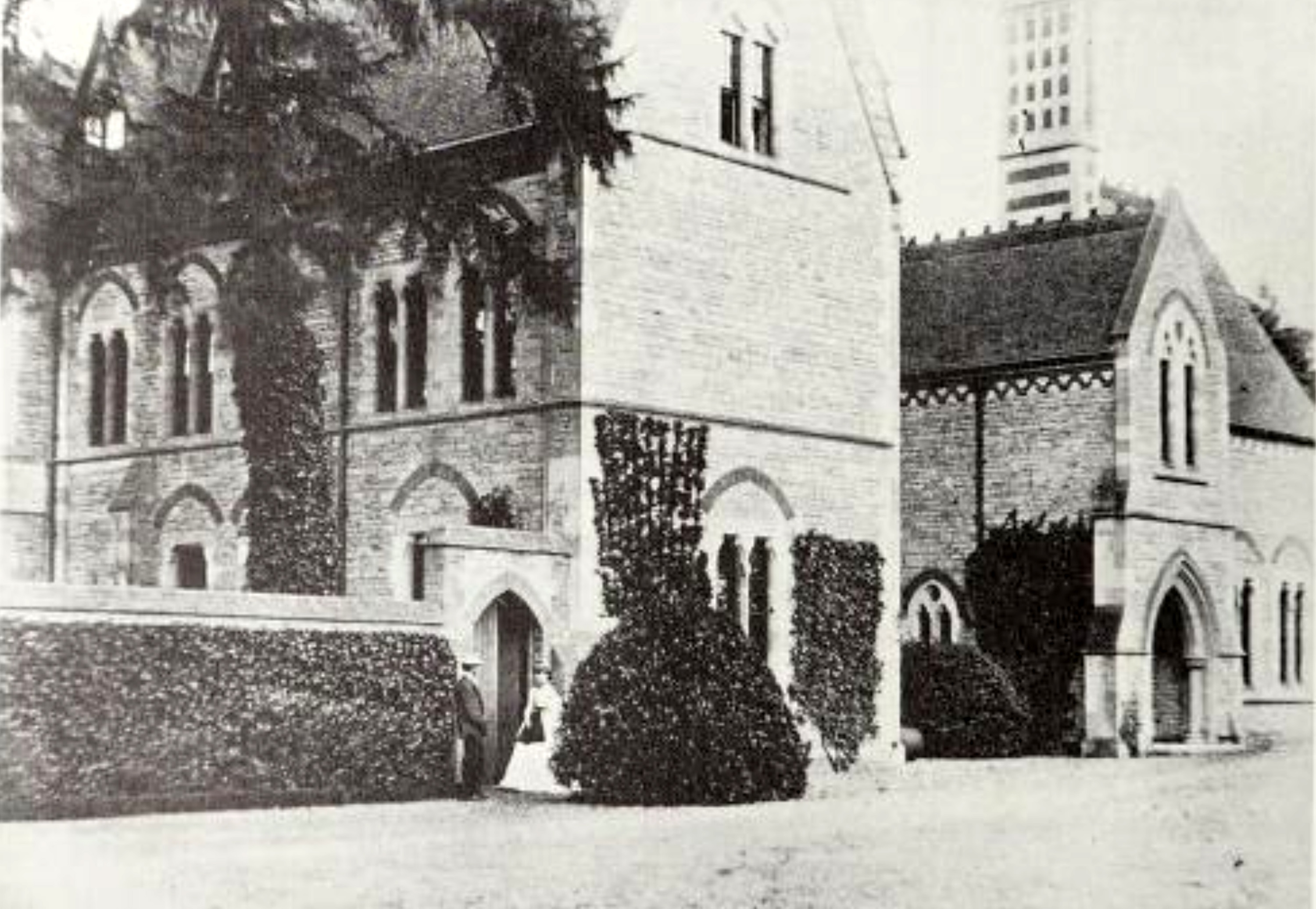
Milton Ernest Hall in about 1870

In 1853 Benjamin bought the Milton Ernest Estate and three years later asked his brother in law to build a new house. William Butterfield's biographer states that this was Butterfields only complete country house. His biographer also mentioned that he came to regard Milton Ernest Hall as his family home.

In 1872 the Starey family were forced to sell the Hall because of some financial disasters on the stock exchange. However, there were obviously some strong ties to the property because fifty years later his son John bought the house back. In the interim there were several owners. The first was Thomas Bagnall.

Thomas Bagnall (1829–1912) was a wealthy iron manufacturer. He was a magistrate and High Sheriff of Bedfordshire in 1879. In 1859 he married Fanny Mackworth (1833–1909) who was the daughter of Captain Herbert Mackworth. The couple had five daughters. In 1884 the Bagnall family moved to Yorkshire and the house was sold to the Chapman family.

Madeline Emily Chapman (1833–1900), wife of Alfred Daniel Chapman (1827–1902) bought the Hall. She had just inherited a large sum from the will of her father Robert Hanbury who was a partner in the brewery firm Truman, Hanbury, Buxton and Co. The couple had no children. Madeline died in 1900 and Alfred sold the hall to Isabella Robinson.

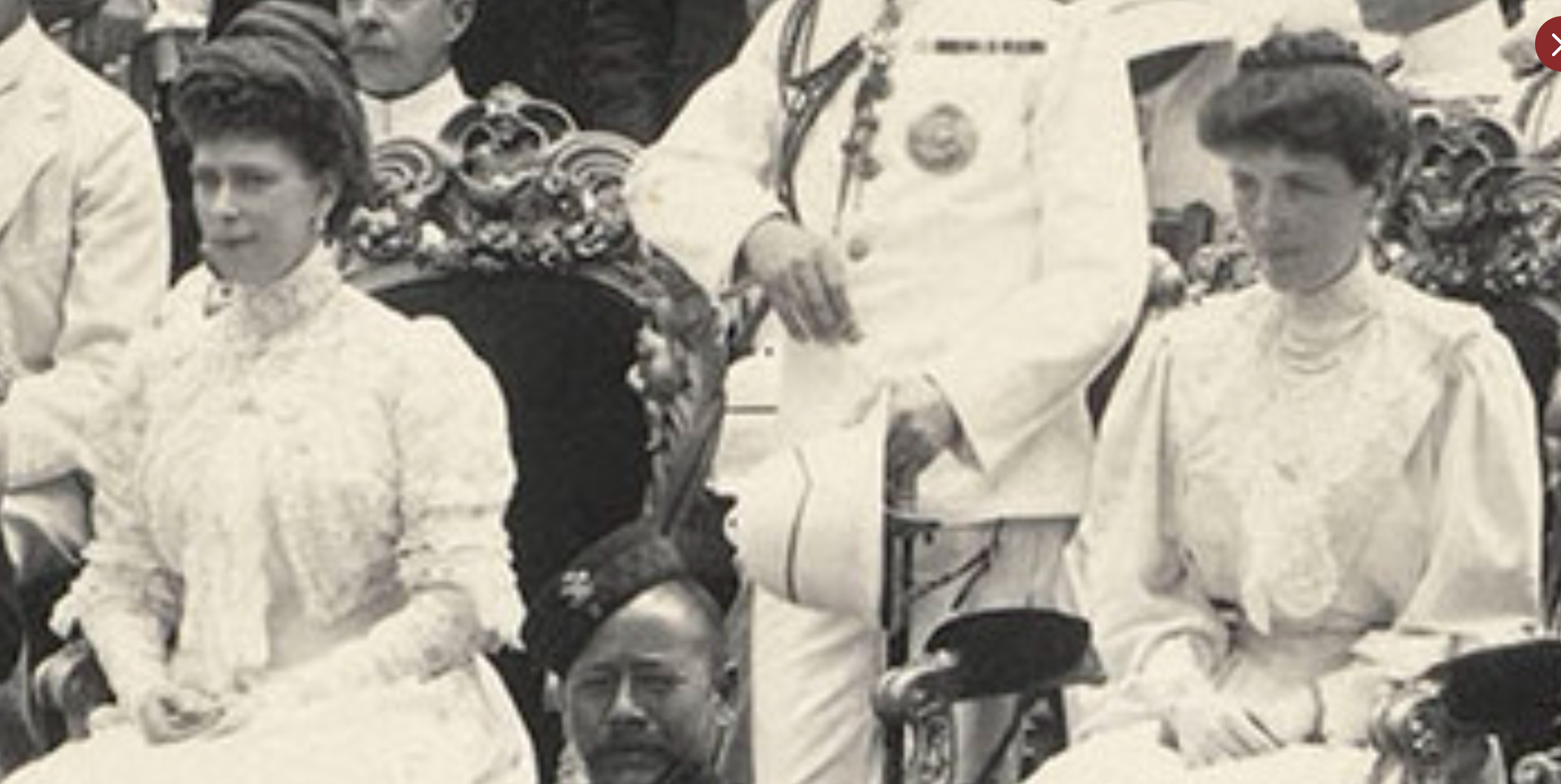
Lady Margaret Lygon on the right sitting next to Queen Mary in India in 1905

Isabella Robinson (1838–1924) was a very wealthy widow. Her husband was Thomas William Usherwood Robinson (1826–1888) who had died in 1888. He had owned Hatfield House and Hardwick Hall in Durham. He also owned a Brewery in Houghton Le Spring. In 1905 her daughter Mary Elizbeth Robinson was married to Captain Christopher Barnes in Church of All Saints, Milton Ernest and a reception held at the Hall. A detailed description of the event was reported in the newspapers of that time.

In 1906 the house was sold to Oliver Russell, 2nd Baron Ampthill (1869–1935) who had just returned from India where he had served as Governor of Madras for six years. He was the son of Odo Russell, 1st Baron Ampthill who was a British Diplomat. In 1894 he married Lady Margaret Lygon (1874–1957) who was the daughter of Frederick Lygon, 6th Earl Beauchamp.

Lady Margaret was a personal friend of Queen Mary. She is described in the diaries of Henry Channon as “Queen Mary’s closest friend”. She became friends with the Queen who was then a Princess when she was only 17 and they remained close all of their lives.

== Later residents ==
In 1918 the Russells moved to Oakley, Bedfordshire and the Hall was advertised for sale. The Starey family who were the previous owners bought the property. John Helps Starey (1848–1928) was the son of the original owner Benjamin. He owned numerous rubber plantations in Asia between 1864 and 1900. In 1882 he married Grace Katherine Dingwall (1855–1940) who was the daughter of Charles Dingwell of Portley, Caterham. The couple had six children. John died in 1928 and his wife Grace continued to live at the Hall until her death in 1940. The property continued to be owned by the Starey family until 1968 when it was bought by Ludwik Dobrzański. In 1971 he sold it to Francis Harmer Brown who turned it into a restaurant and hotel.
