= Hugh Dawnay, 8th Viscount Downe =

British Army general

Major-General The Right Honourable The Viscount Downe KCVO CB CIE
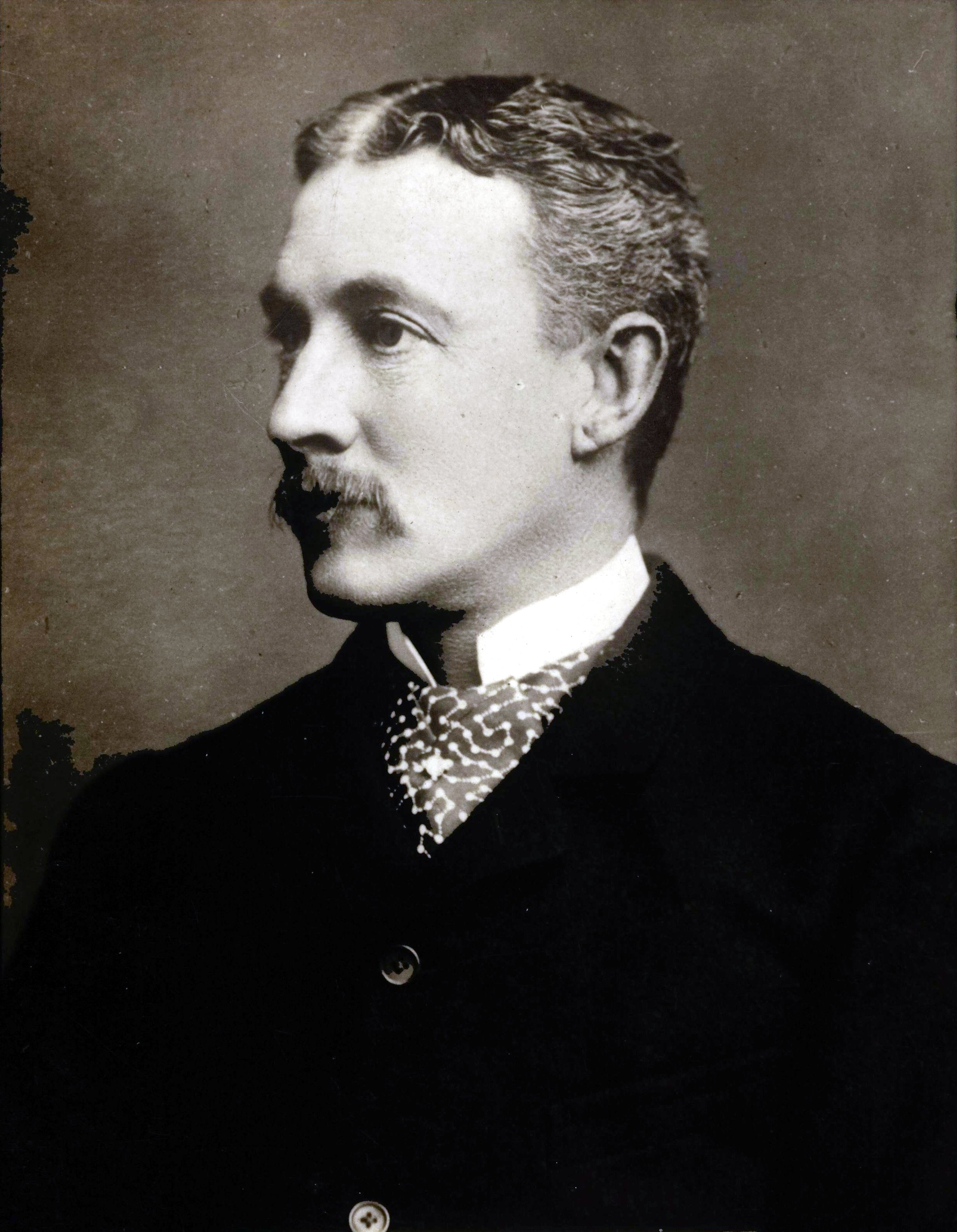
- Cigarette card of Viscount Downe produced during the Second Boer War
- In office 26 January 1857 – 21 January 1924
- Preceded by: 7th Viscount Downe
- Succeeded by: 9th Viscount Downe

Personal details
- Born: Hugh Richard Dawnay; 20 July 1844
- Died: 21 January 1924 (aged 79)
- Spouses: Lady Cecilia Maria Charlotte Molyneaux (m. 1869; died 1910) Florence Faith Dening (m. 1911)
- Children: 5
- Parent(s): William Dawnay, 7th Viscount Downe; Mary (née Bagot), Viscountess Downe
- Education: Eton College
- Alma mater: Christ Church, Oxford

Military service
- Rank: Major-General
- Battles/wars: Anglo-Zulu War; Second Boer War

Major-General Hugh Richard Dawnay, 8th Viscount Downe, KCVO, CB, CIE (20 July 1844 – 21 January 1924) was a British Army general and President of the Marylebone Cricket Club.

== Early life ==
Dawnay was the second son of William Dawnay, 7th Viscount Downe and his wife Mary Isabel Bagot, daughter of Richard Bagot, Bishop of Bath and Wells. One younger brother, Lewis Payn Dawnay, was MP for Thirsk and another, Guy Cuthbert Dawnay, traveller and soldier, was MP for the North Riding of Yorkshire, 1882-85.

In 1857, Dawnay succeeded his father, who died in his forties. He was educated at Eton College and attended Christ Church, Oxford.

== Career ==
Lord Downe was an officer in the 2nd Regiment of Life Guards, where he was promoted to captain on 25 June 1873. He fought in the Anglo-Zulu War in 1879, for which he was mentioned in despatches. He was Lieutenant-Colonel of the 10th Hussars between 1887 and 1892. From 1899 to March 1900 he served as a staff officer in the Second Boer War in South Africa, where he was deputed to accompany the military attachés representing foreign powers. He was mentioned in despatches twice, in a despatch dated 31 March 1900 the Commander-in-Chief Lord Roberts stated that he "discharged his duties with tact and discretion". He was then appointed in command of a brigade of Imperial Yeomanry.

After his return to the United Kingdom, Lord Downe was in March 1901 asked by King Edward VII to take part in a special diplomatic mission to announce the King's accession to the governments of Belgium, Bavaria, Italy, Württemberg, and The Netherlands.

In July 1901 he was promoted to the temporary rank of Brigadier general on the Staff to command the Cavalry Brigade at the Curragh, where training for fighting in South Africa took place. In December 1901 her received the local rank of major-general whilst so employed. He retired from the army on 30 July 1902, and was granted the honorary rank of major-general.

Lord Downe was the author of a 1902 report to inquire into the working of the British Army Remount Department in South Africa, Australia and New Zealand. The report, which was especially critical of the supply of horses during the preceding war in South Africa, was published in a government blue-book with other such reports (Cd.995).

In early 1903 Lord Downe was appointed a Special Envoy deputized by the King to travel to Iran to present the Shah with the insignia of the Order of the Garter.

=== Honours ===
Downe was created Baron Dawnay, of Danby in the North Riding of the County of York, in the Peerage of the United Kingdom, on 24 July 1897 and subsequently sat in the House of Lords (his inherited viscountcy was Irish and did not give him this right). He was invested as a Companion of the Order of the Indian Empire (CIE) in 1886, and Companion of the Order of the Bath (CB) in 1900 for services in South Africa. He was appointed a Commander of the Royal Victorian Order (CVO) in the November 1902 Birthday Honours list, and promoted to a Knight Commander of the same order (KCVO) by King Edward VII on 18 December 1902.

=== Cricket ===
A cricketer he played for I Zingari and the MCC, playing in the Aborigines v MCC test at Lord's in 1868 in the first tour of England by an Australian team. He became President of the MCC in 1872

== Personal life ==
On 12 July 1869, Lord Downe was married to Lady Cecilia Maria Charlotte Molyneux (1838–1910), the only daughter of Charles Molyneux, 3rd Earl of Sefton and the former Mary Augusta Gregge-Hopwood (only daughter of Robert Gregge-Hopwood of Hopwood Hall). They had five children:

- John Dawnay, 9th Viscount Downe (1872–1931), who married Dorothy ffolkes, daughter of Sir William ffolkes, 3rd Baronet.
- Hon. Beryl Dawnay (1873–1950), who married Sir Archibald Henry Campbell, son of George Campbell.
- Hon. Norah Dawnay (1874–1947), who died unmarried.
- Major Hon. Hugh Dawnay (1875–1914 †), who was killed in action in World War I near Ypres in November 1914. He was married to Lady Susan de la Poer Beresford, daughter of politician John Beresford, 5th Marquess of Waterford. They had four sons who were all career military officers, including Commandant of the Royal Military Academy Sandhurst and British Army general Maj-Gen Sir David Dawnay.
- Hon. Faith Dawnay (1877–1952), who died unmarried.

After Lady Downe's death, he remarried on 27 July 1911 to Florence Faith Dening, a daughter of Rev. Thomas Henry Dening, the Vicar of Holy Trinity Church, Kilburn. Lord Downe died on 21 January 1924. After his death, his widow remarried to Rev. Arthur Maxwell Bury, Vicar of Loose, Maidstone, on 15 April 1931.

Military offices
Preceded by Lord Ralph Drury Kerr	Colonel of the 10th Royal Hussars (Prince of Wales's Own); 1912–1924	Succeeded by The Lord Byng of Vimy
Peerage of the United Kingdom
New creation	Baron Dawnay; 1897–1924	Succeeded by John Dawnay
Peerage of Ireland
Preceded by William Dawnay	Viscount Downe; 1857–1924	Succeeded by John Dawnay
