= Church of All Saints, Milton Ernest =

Anglican church in Bedfordshire, England

Coordinates: 52.1938°N 0.5091°W

Church of All Saints
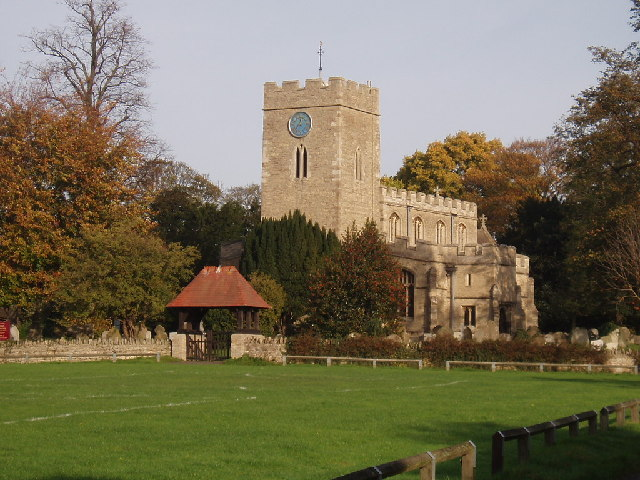
- Church as seen from the road

- Location within Bedfordshire
- Location: Milton Ernest, Bedfordshire
- Address: Thurleigh Road Milton Ernest MK44 1RF
- Country: England
- Denomination: Church of England
- Website: https://www.mptchurches.org.uk/milton2.htm

History
- Former name: Church of All Hallows
- Status: Active
- Founded: 11th century

Administration
- Diocese: St Albans
- Benefice: Milton Ernest, Pavenham, and Thurleigh

Church of All Saints is an Anglican church in the parish of Milton Ernest, Bedfordshire, England. It is part of the Benefice of Milton Ernest, Pavenham, and Thurleigh, in the Diocese of St. Albans under the Church of England.

== History ==
The building as it stands presently is probably a replacement for an earlier wooden structure dating from the eleventh century. Portions of the current Church of All Saints, such as the chancel, date to at least to the twelfth century, and expansions to the nave and aisles occurred in the fourteenth and fifteenth centuries. The architect William Butterfield heavily restored the church, including the west tower, in 1864–65. The tower is 75 ft (23 metres) tall and dates from the 13th century. It has a clock dated 1882 and 6 bells which are still in use.

The church is still in use today, and offers both Common Worship and Book of Common Prayer services.

== Churchyard ==
The Church of All Saints features a memorial in honour of local soldiers from Milton Ernest who perished in the Great War. The burial grounds are still active.

== Protected status ==
Church of All Saints is a Grade I listed church as of 13 July 1964.

== See also ==
- Grade I listed buildings in Bedfordshire
