= Milton Ernest =

Village in Bedfordshire, England

Coordinates: 52.1833°N 0.5166°W

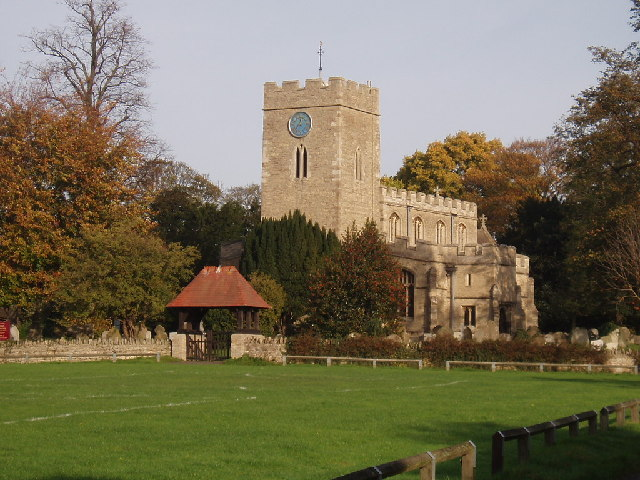
- All Saints' Church

- Location within Bedfordshire
- Population: 754 (2001); 767 (2011 Census)
- OS grid reference: TL014025
- Unitary authority: Bedford
- Ceremonial county: Bedfordshire
- Region: East
- Country: England
- Sovereign state: United Kingdom
- Post town: BEDFORD
- Postcode district: MK44
- Dialling code: 01234
- Police: Bedfordshire
- Fire: Bedfordshire and Luton
- Ambulance: East of England
- UK Parliament: North Bedfordshire

Milton Ernest is a village and civil parish in Bedfordshire, England, about 5 miles (8.0 km) north of Bedford itself. It had a population of 754 in 2001. This had risen to 761 according to the 2011 census. The village is situated on the east bank of the River Great Ouse, and is the site of Milton Ernest Hall, which was used as the United States Eighth Air Force's support command headquarters in the Second World War.

The village is named in the Domesday Book in the hundred of Stodden. The entry reads:

"Middletone / Mildentone: Miles Crispin and William Basset from Hugh de Beauchamp; Thorgils from Nigel d'Aubigny; Reginald from Walter of Flanders; Ivo, Hugh de Grandmesnil's steward from Adelaide, Hugh de Grandmesnil's wife; a beadle from the king. Mill."

All Saints' Church was built between the 12th and 15th centuries.

Possible variations in spelling may include "Milton Harneys", in 1396, & "Midelton Erneys", in 1430. The first half of the name means "Middle Farm". The second half of the name is derived from the name of the main manor of the village and was added in the 13th century to distinguish it from Bedfordshire's other Milton (Bryant).

Milton Ernest has a small voluntary controlled village school, closely linked to the church, that has between 60 and 65 pupils drawn from this and surrounding villages. The secondary school for the area is Sharnbrook Academy, in the village of Sharnbrook, located around 3 miles (4.8 km) away.

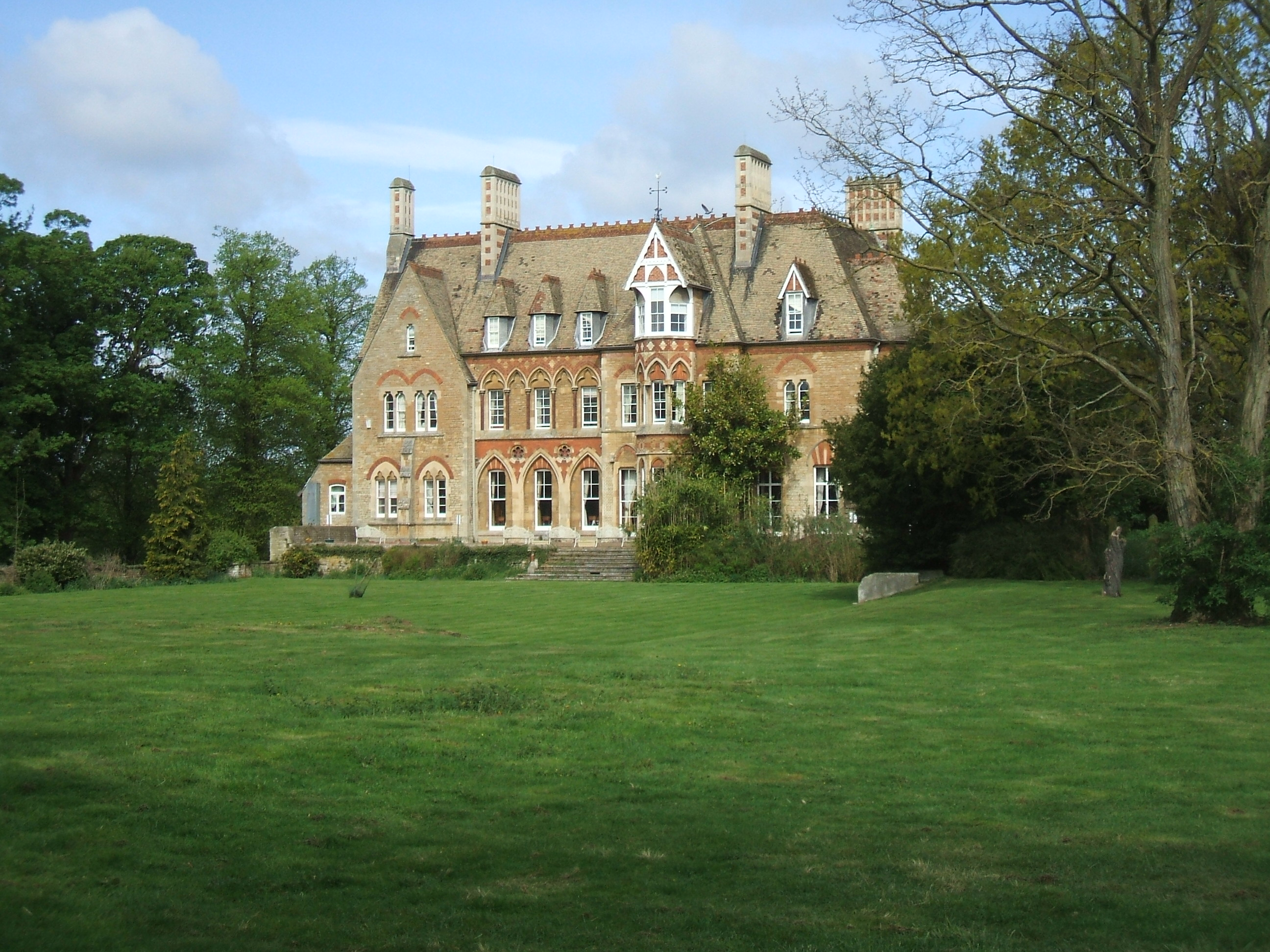
Milton Ernest Hall

On 15 December 1944, Glenn Miller took off from RAF Twinwood Farm, in neighbouring Clapham, on his last, ill-fated flight, and was last seen in public in the Queen's Head Hotel in Milton Ernest before he disappeared. A plaque at Milton Ernest Hall honours Major Glenn Miller and members of the United States Eighth Air Force, it reads "In memory of all the personnel who served in World War II at Milton Ernest Hall headquarters USAAF Eight Air Force Service Command Station 608 1943-1946, also Major Glenn Miller & the band of the Allied Expeditionary Force who were stationed here from July to December 1944".

The controversial Yarl's Wood Immigration Removal Centre is located in the parish.

Milton Ernest was also home to the UK's first indoor skydiving and indoor surfing facilities. However both have now ceased operations.

A book entitled "The Importance of Milton Ernest" was published by David Newman and details the above and much more of Milton Ernest history and prominence
