= William Dawnay, 7th Viscount Downe =

British politician

William Henry Dawnay, 7th Viscount Downe (15 May 1812 – 26 January 1857) was a British politician.

== Background ==
Downe was the son of the Reverend William Henry Dawnay, 6th Viscount Downe, Rector of Sessay and Thormanby in North Yorkshire.

== Political career ==
Downe was returned to Parliament as one of two representatives for Rutland in 1841, a seat he held until 1846. The latter year he succeeded his father in the viscountcy. However, as this was an Irish peerage it did not entitle him to a seat in the House of Lords.

== Family ==
Lord Downe married Mary Isabel, daughter of the Right Reverend Richard Bagot, in 1843. They had eight sons and two daughters:

- Maj.-Gen. Hugh Dawnay, 8th Viscount Downe (1844–1924)
- Lt.-Col. Hon. Lewis Payn Dawnay (1 April 1846 – 30 July 1910), Coldstream Guards, inherited Beningbrough Hall from his uncle Payan in 1891
- Hon. Alan Charles Dawnay (15 June 1847 – 3 March 1853)
- Hon. Guy Cuthbert Dawnay (26 July 1848 – 28 February 1889)
- Hon. Lt. Eustace Henry Dawnay (15 April 1850 – 15 December 1928), Coldstream Guards, married Lady Evelyn de Vere Capell, daughter of Arthur de Vere Capell, Viscount Malden, and had issue
- Hon. Capt. William Frederick Dawnay (14 October 1851 – 29 September 1904), Staffordshire Militia, married Lady Adelaide Parker, daughter of Thomas Parker, 6th Earl of Macclesfield and had issue
- Hon. Geoffrey Nicolas Dawnay (13 December 1852 – 31 December 1941), married Emily Bulteel and had issue
- Hon. Capt. (Temp. Maj.) Francis Herbert Dawnay (11 December 1853 – 26 June 1914), Yorkshire Hussars, barrister
- Hon. Alice Isabell Dawnay (1855 – 8 October 1929)
- Hon. Edith Mary Dawnay (1856 – 15 July 1941), married Robert Grant-Suttie and had issue

He died in January 1857, aged 44, and was succeeded in the viscountcy by his eldest son, Hugh. Lady Downe later remarried and died in London on 14 April 1900 (as Dowager Viscountess Downe). Lord Downe, his wife and her second husband, are buried in the churchyard of the Church of St James, Baldersby in North Yorkshire.

Parliament of the United Kingdom
Preceded by Sir Gilbert Heathcote, Bt; Hon. Charles Noel	Member of Parliament for Rutland; 1841–1846; With: Sir Gilbert Heathcote, Bt	Succeeded by Sir Gilbert Heathcote, Bt; George Finch
Peerage of Ireland
Preceded by William Dawnay	Viscount Downe; 1846–1857	Succeeded by Hugh Richard Dawnay
