= William Butterfield =

British architect (1814–1900)

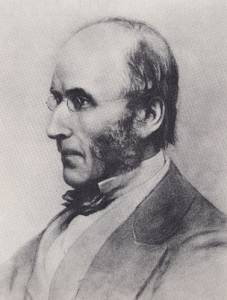
- Born: 7 September 1814; London, England
- Died: 23 February 1900 (aged 85); London, England
- Resting place: Tottenham Cemetery
- Occupation: Architect
- Awards: Royal Gold Medal (1884)
- Buildings: St Ninian's Cathedral, Perth in Scotland; St Paul's Cathedral, Melbourne in Australia
- Projects: Keble College, Oxford

William Butterfield (7 September 1814 – 23 February 1900) was a British Gothic Revival architect and associated with the Oxford Movement (or Tractarian Movement). He is noted for his use of polychromy.

== Biography ==
William Butterfield was born in London in 1814. His parents were strict non-conformists who ran a chemist's shop in the Strand. He was one of nine children and was educated at a local school. At the age of 16, he was apprenticed to Thomas Arber, a builder in Pimlico, who later became bankrupt. He studied architecture under E. L. Blackburne (1833–1836). From 1838 to 1839, he was an assistant to Harvey Eginton, an architect in Worcester, where he became articled. He established his own architectural practice at Lincoln's Inn Fields in 1840.

From 1842 Butterfield was involved with the Cambridge Camden Society, later The Ecclesiological Society. He contributed designs to the Society's journal, The Ecclesiologist. His involvement influenced his architectural style. He also drew religious inspiration from the Oxford Movement and as such, he was very high church despite his non-conformist upbringing. He was a Gothic revival architect, and as such he reinterpreted the original Gothic style in Victorian terms. Many of his buildings were for religious use, although he also designed for colleges and schools.

Butterfield's church of All Saints, Margaret Street, London, was, in the view of Henry-Russell Hitchcock, the building that initiated the High Victorian Gothic era. It was designed in 1850, completed externally by 1853 and consecrated in 1859. Flanked by a clergy house and school, it was intended as a "model" church by its sponsors, the Ecclesiological Society. The church was built of red-brick, a material long out of use in London, patterned with bands of black brick, the first use of polychrome brick in the city, with bands of stone on the spire. The interior was even more richly decorated, with marble and tile marquetry.

In 1849, just before Butterfield designed the church, John Ruskin had published his Seven Lamps of Architecture, in which he had urged the study of Italian Gothic and the use of polychromy. Many contemporaries perceived All Saints' as Italian in character, though in fact it combines fourteenth century English details, with a German-style spire.

Also in 1850 he designed, without polychromy, St Matthias' in Stoke Newington, with a bold gable-roofed tower. At St Bartholomew's, Yealmpton in the same year, Butterfield used a considerable amount of marquetry work for the interior, and built striped piers, using two colours of marble.

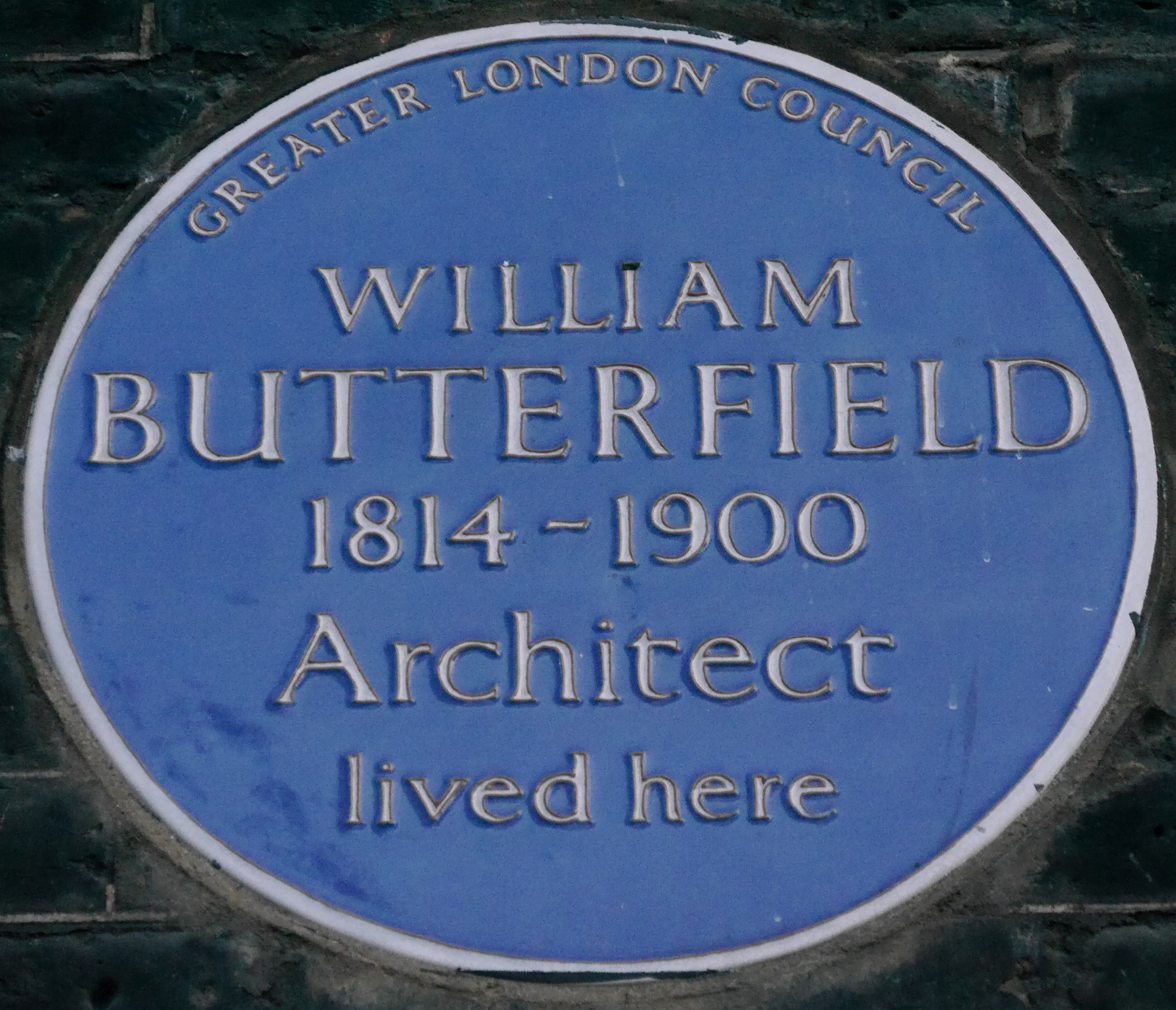
Blue plaque, 42 Bedford Square, London

At Oxford, Butterfield designed Keble College, in a style radically divergent from the university's existing traditions of Gothic architecture, its walls boldly striped with various colours of brick. Intended for clerical students, it was largely built in 1868–70, on a fairly domestic scale, with a more monumental chapel of 1873–6. In his buildings of 1868–72 at Rugby School, the polychromy is even more brash.

Butterfield received the RIBA Gold Medal in 1884. He died in London in 1900, and was buried in a simple Gothic tomb (designed by himself) in Tottenham Cemetery, Haringey, North London. The grave can be easily seen from the public path through the cemetery, close to the gate from Tottenham Churchyard. There is a blue plaque on his house in Bedford Square, London.

== Works ==
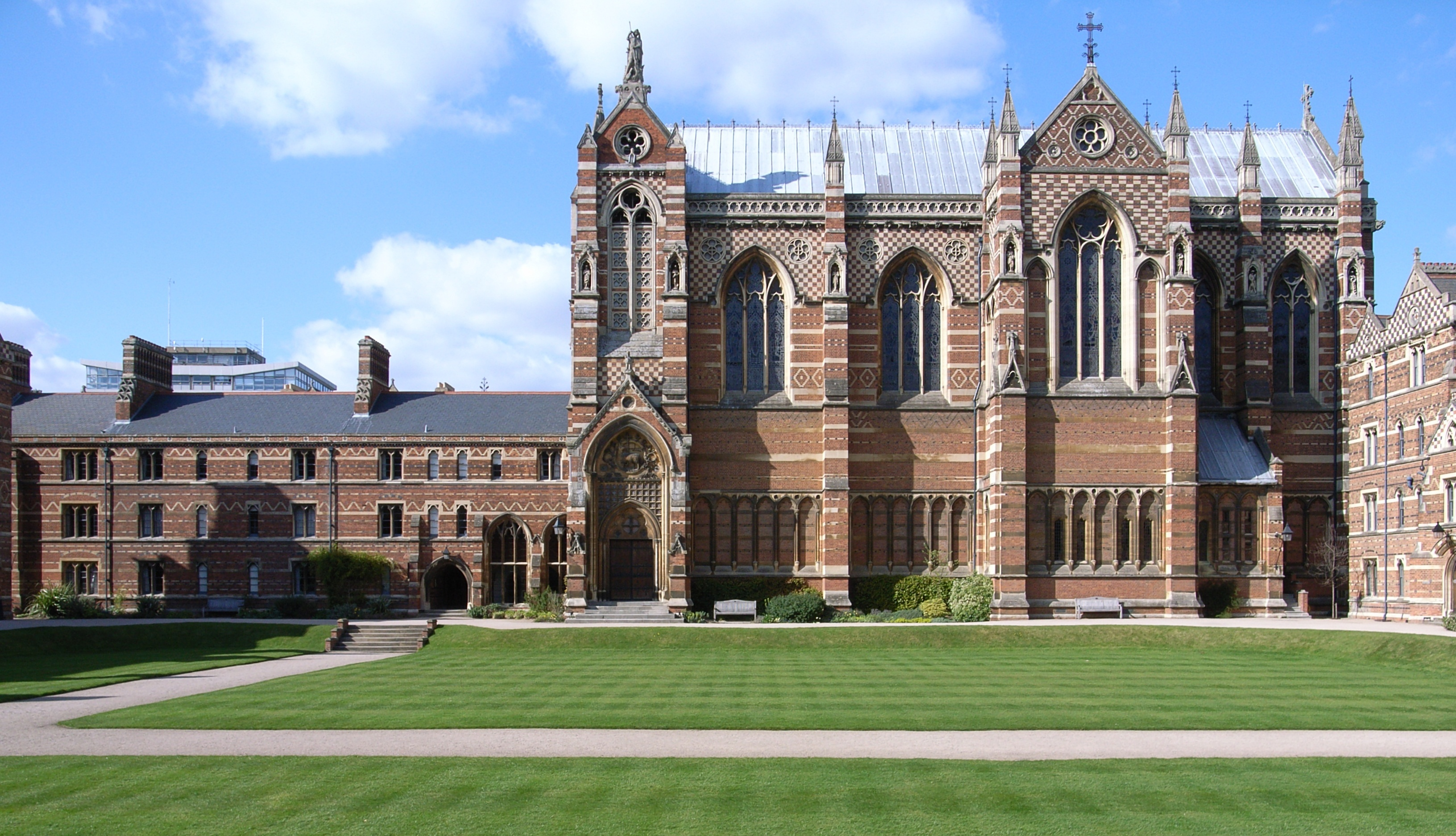
Keble College Chapel, Oxford

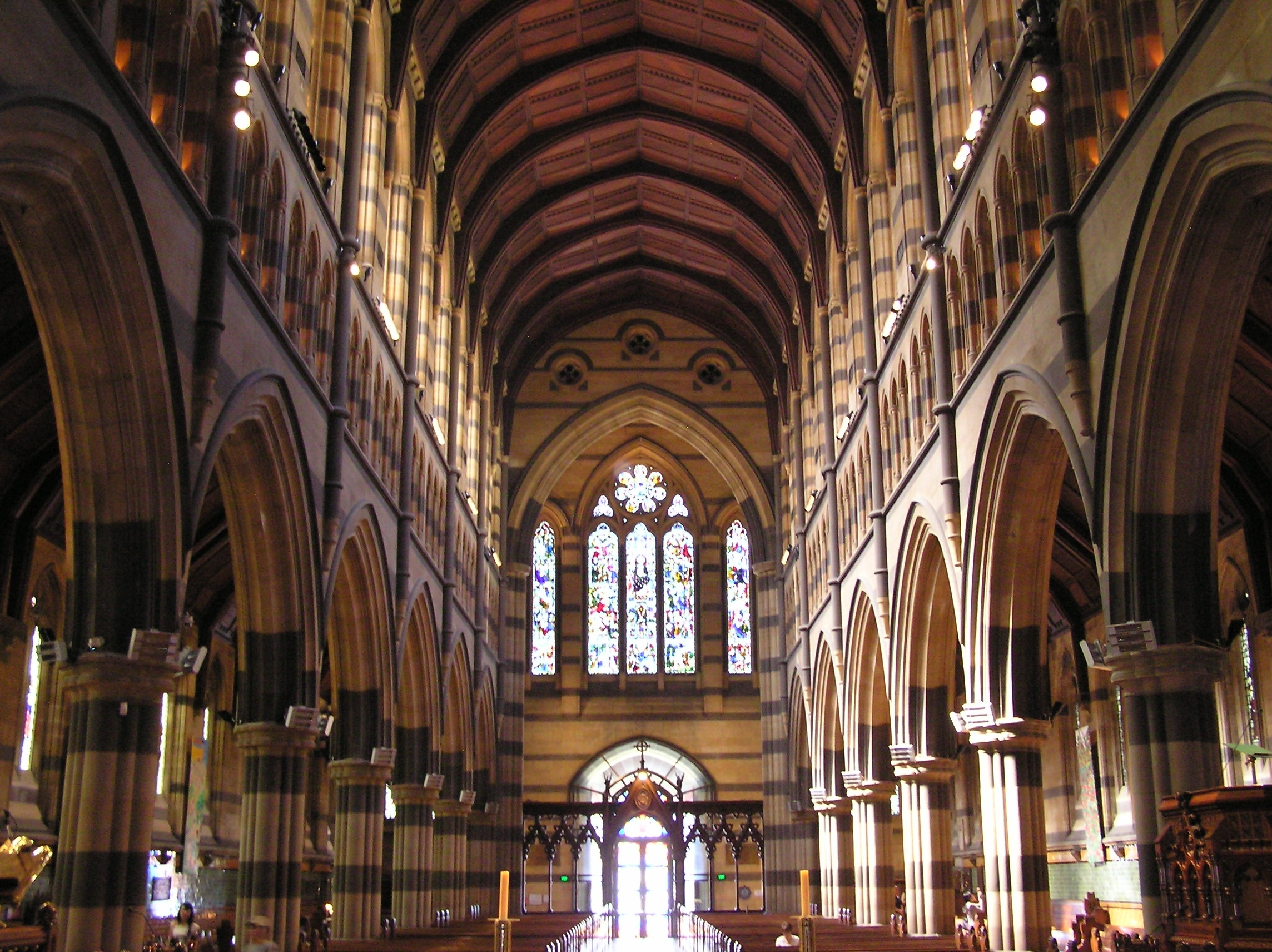
St Paul's Cathedral, Melbourne, Australia

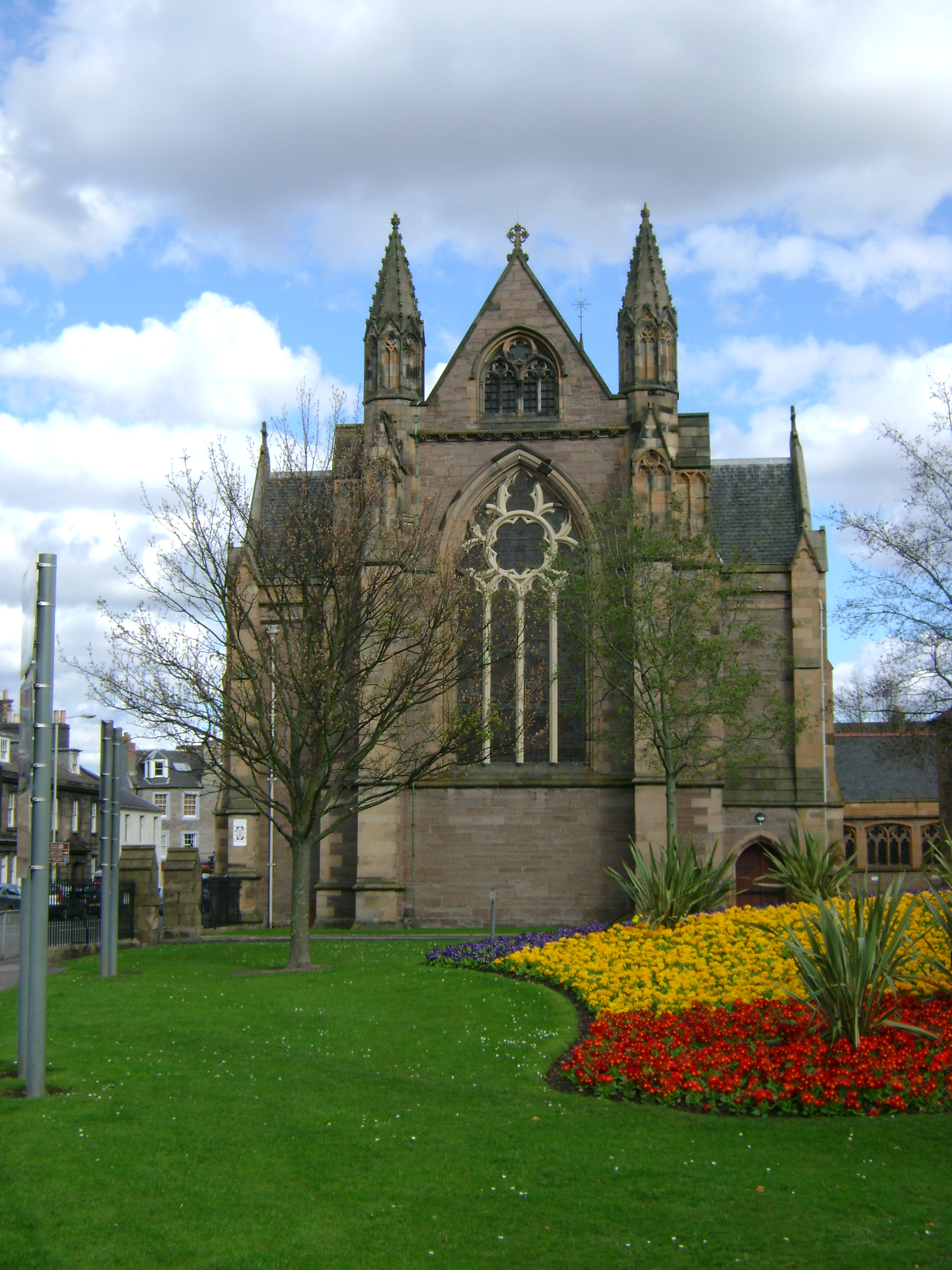
St Ninian's Cathedral, Perth, Scotland

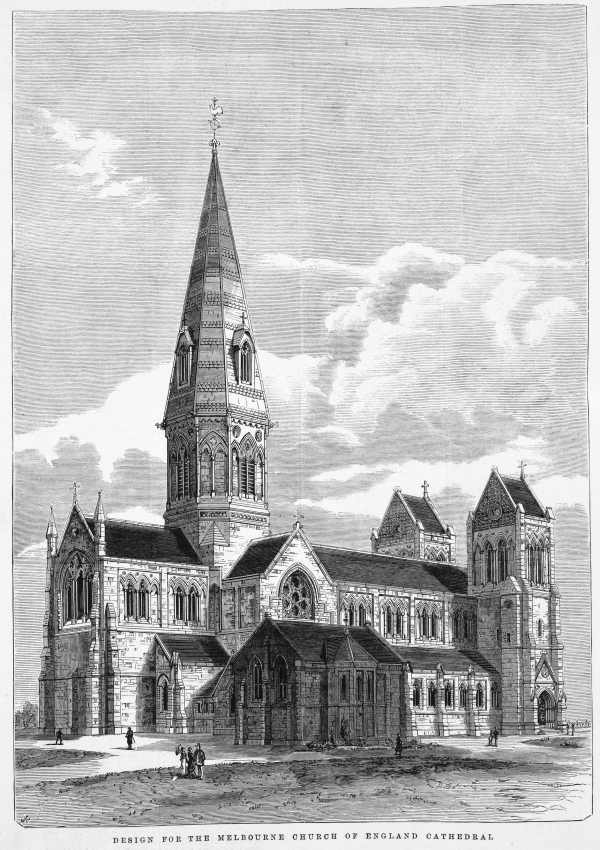
William Butterfield's original design for the new Anglican cathedral (St Paul's) in Melbourne, Australia

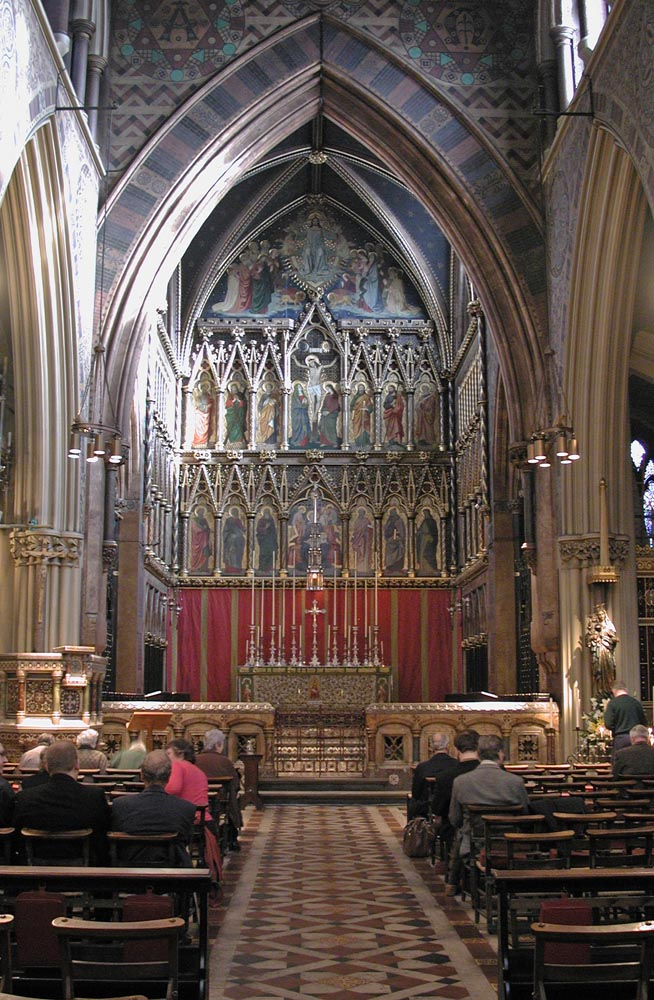
All Saints, Margaret Street, London (detail of interior)

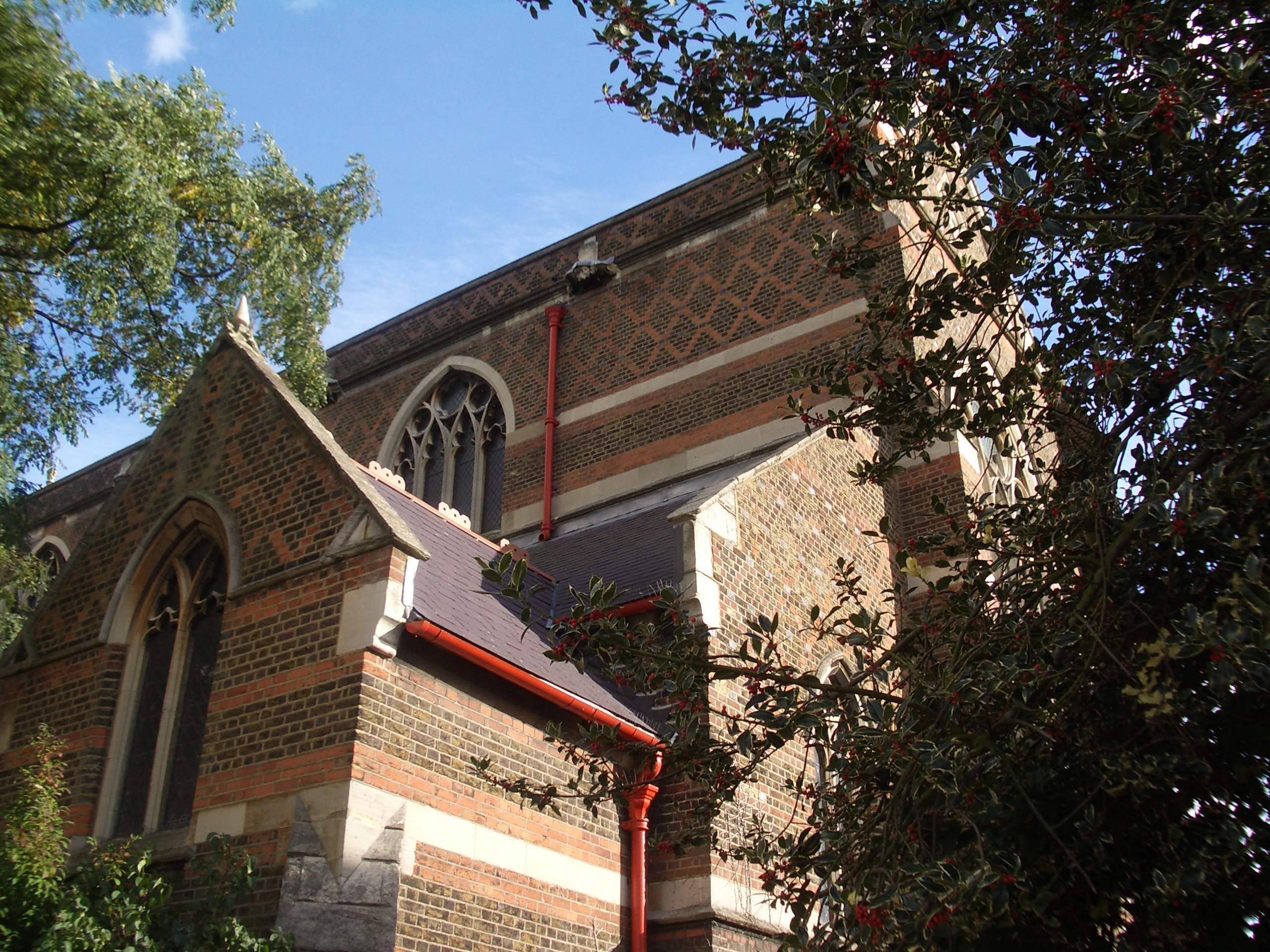
St Mary's church, Brookfield

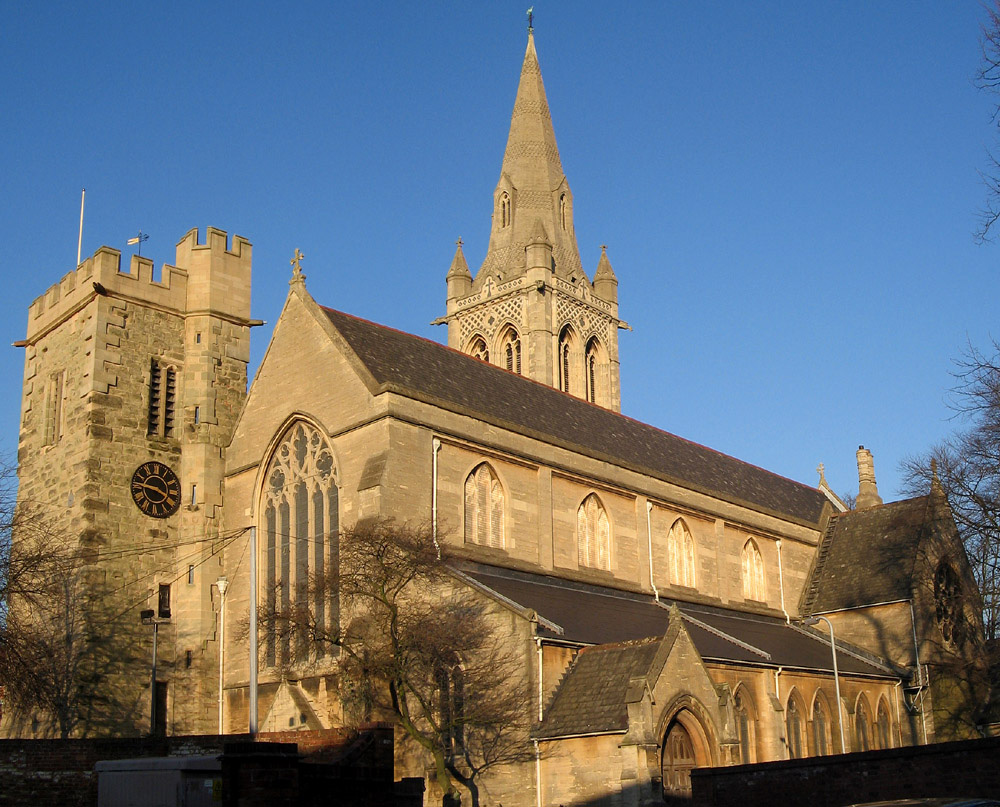
St Andrew's Church, Rugby

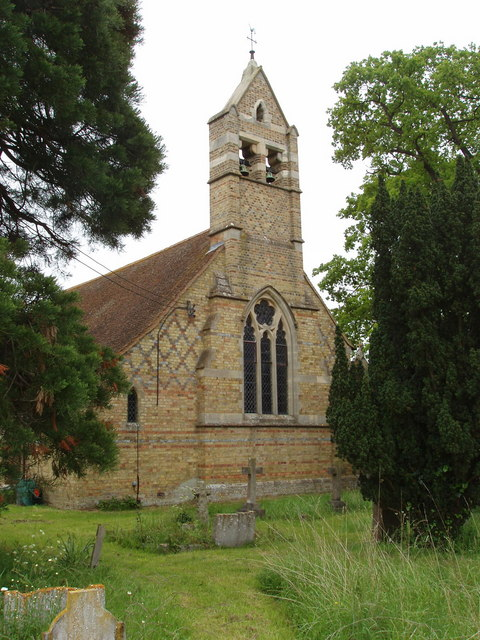
St Barnabas's Church, Horton-cum-Studley

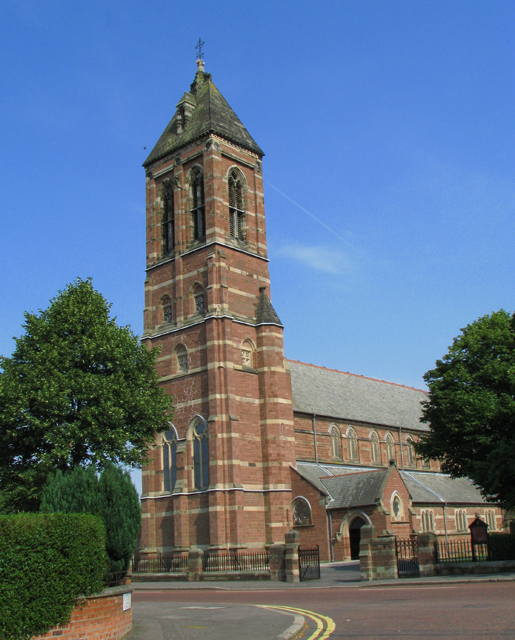
St Mark's Church, Dundela, Belfast

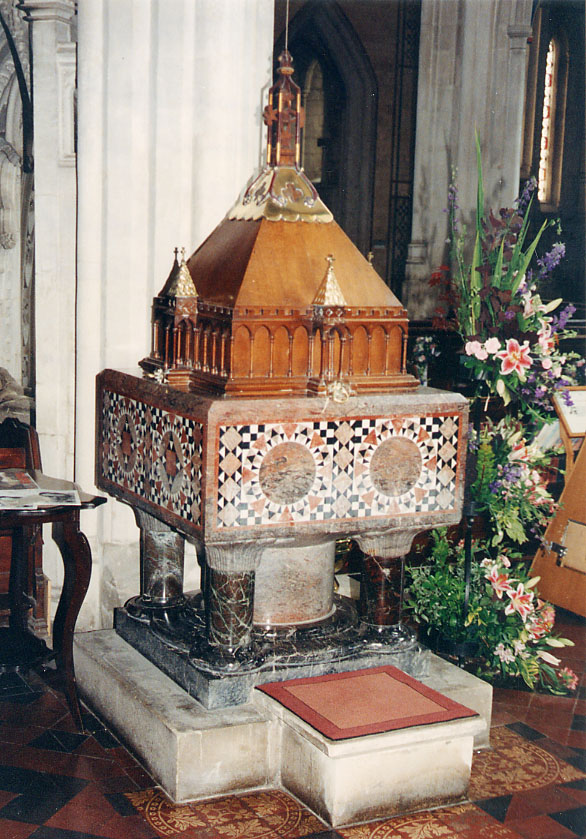
Font of Ottery St Mary Parish Church, Devon

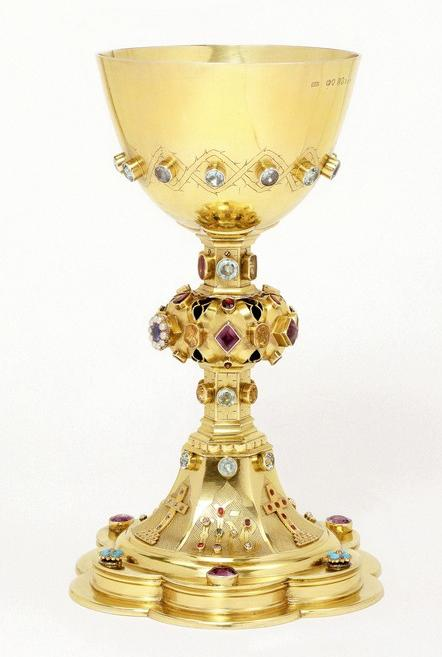
Chalice designed by William Butterfield, 1856–1857 (hallmarked) V&A Museum no. CIRC.521–1962

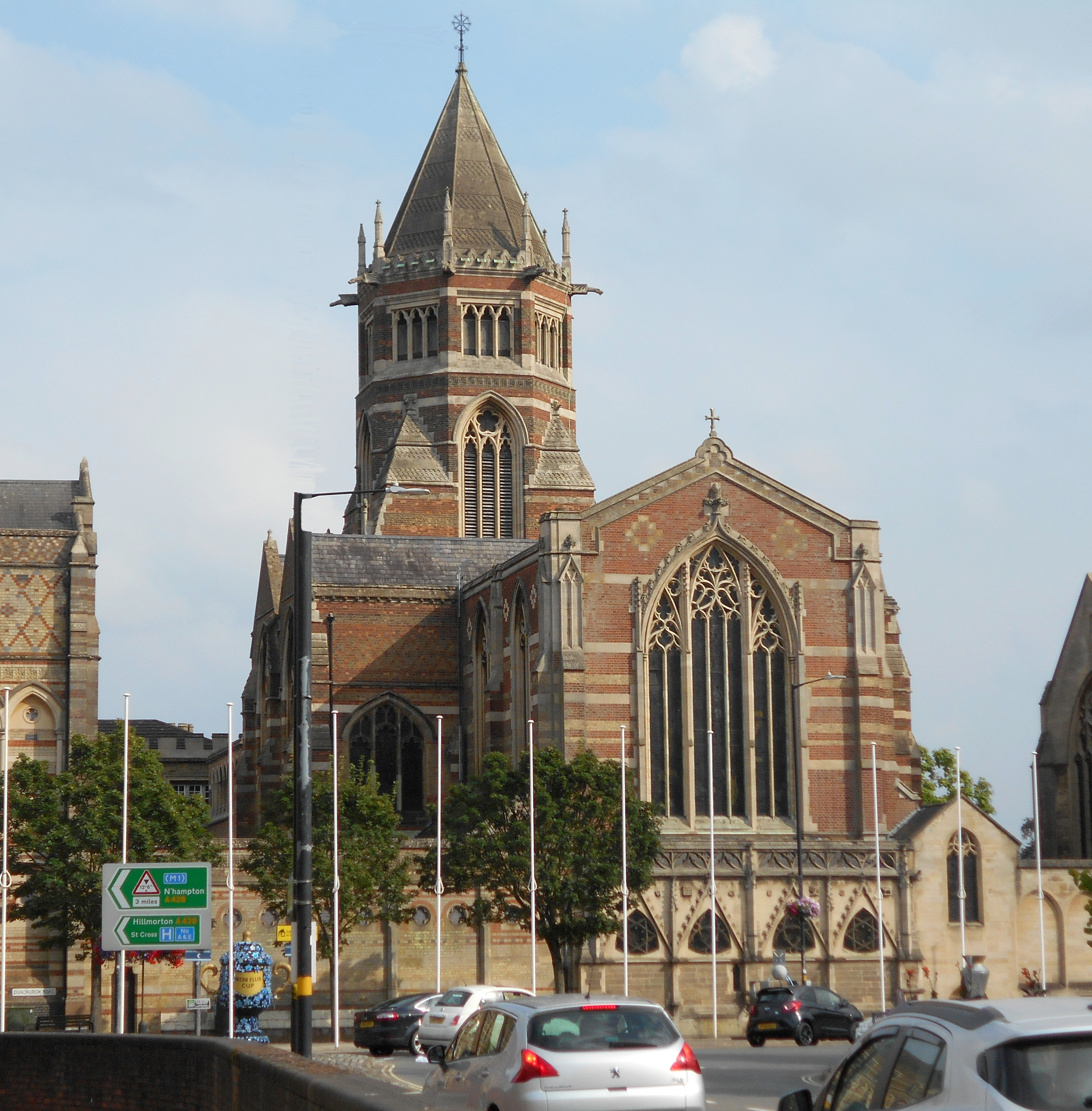
Chapel, Rugby School

Butterfield's buildings include:

- 1842
  - Highbury Congregational Chapel (Cotham Church), Bristol
- 1843
  - St John's Church, Jedburgh: lychgate
- 1845
  - St Saviour's Church and vicarage, Coalpit Heath, south Gloucestershire, 1845 (Butterfield's first Anglican work)
  - St Augustine's College, Canterbury, Kent, 1845
  - St John the Baptist parish church, Hellidon, Northamptonshire: restoration, 1845–47
- 1846
  - St Nicholas' Church, Thanington Without, Kent: restoration, 1846
  - St Nicholas' Church, Ash, Kent: restoration, 1846
  - Abbey Church of Saints Peter & Paul, Dorchester on Thames, Oxfordshire: restoration, 1846–53
- 1847
  - St Andrew's parish church, Ogbourne St Andrew, Wiltshire: restoration, 1847–49 and vicarage, 1848
  - Parish Church of the Holy Trinity with St Edmund, Horfield, Bristol, nave and aisles c1847
- 1849
  - St Bartholomew's Church, Yealmpton, Devon, PL8 2HG, reconstruction 1849–1852
  - The Cathedral of the Isles, Great Cumbrae, Scotland, started 1849 but still incomplete
  - St Edmund's Church, Thurlaston, Warwickshire. Built as a combined church and school.
  - St Mary's Church, Ottery St Mary, Devon restoration 1849–1850
- 1850
  - Goldern Lion Hotel (1850) in the Norfolk sea-side town of Hunstanton.
  - St Mary Magdalene church, West Lavington, West Sussex, 1850
  - St Ninian's Cathedral, Perth, Scotland, 1850
  - St James & St Anne parish church and vicarage, Alfington, Devon, 1850
  - Wantage Cemetery, Berkshire: chapel, 1850
- 1851
  - St Mary's Church, Emmorton, Maryland: stained glass windows, 1851
  - St Martin's Church, Great Mongeham, Kent: restoration, 1851
- 1853
  - St Mary and St Melor parish church, Amesbury, Wiltshire: restoration, 1852–1853
  - All Saints, Wykeham, 1853–1855
  - Milton Ernest Hall, Bedfordshire, 1853–1858
  - St Mary's Church, Langley, Kent, 1853
- 1854
  - St Paul's Church, Hensall, North Yorkshire
  - The Red House, Hensall, North Yorkshire
  - Hutton Buscel Village Hall, North Yorkshire
  - St Nicholas' Hospital, Salisbury, Wiltshire: restoration, 1854
  - St John the Baptist's Church, Pollington
  - Church of the Holy Trinity, Snaith
- 1855
  - St Mary's parish church, Marlston, Berkshire, 1855
  - All Saints' Church, Braishfield, Hampshire, 1855
- 1856
  - St John the Evangelist's parish church, Milton, Oxfordshire, 1856
  - Balliol College, Oxford: chapel, 1856–57
- 1857
  - St Michael's parish church, Gare Hill (Gaer Hill), near Trudoxhill, Somerset, 1857
  - St James' church, school and village buildings, Baldersby St James, North Yorkshire, 1857
  - Charlton-All-Saints, Wiltshire: school, 1857–58
- 1858
  - St Mathew's chapel of ease, Easton, Bristol, 1858; demolished 1923
  - St Andrew's parish church, Landford, Wiltshire, 1858
  - Church of St John the Evangelist, better known as the Afghan Church, Mumbai: the reredos, the Afghan War Memorial mosaics, and the tiles, pews and screen, 1858
  - St John the Evangelist parish church, Hammersmith, 1858–59
  - St John the Baptist, Latton, Wiltshire: chancel, 1858–63
  - Pitt Mission Church and School, Pitt, Hursley, Hampshire, 1858
- 1859
  - All Saints, Margaret Street, London, 1859
  - St Mary the Virgin, Etal, Northumberland 1859
  - St Nicholas' school, Newbury, Berkshire, 1859
  - Standlynch Chapel, Trafalgar House, Wiltshire: restoration, 1859–66
- 1860
  - St Giles' Church, Tadlow, Bedfordshire, 1860
  - Charlton All Saints, Wiltshire: vicarage, 1860–62
  - Clergy house, St Alban the Martyr, Holborn
- 1861
  - St John the Baptist church, Bamford, Hope Valley, Derbyshire: restoration, 1861
  - St Michael's parish church, Letcombe Bassett, Berkshire (now Oxfordshire): nave and south aisle, 1861
  - St Mary the Virgin parish church, Castle Eaton, Wiltshire: restoration, 1861–63
- 1862
  - Lych gate at St Michael & All Angels' Churchyard extension, Houghton-le-Spring, Durham, 1862
  - St Martin's parish church, Bremhill, Wiltshire: restoration, 1862–63
  - St Michael's parish church, Lyneham, Wiltshire: nave roof and chancel, 1862–65
- 1863
  - Church of St Cross, Manchester, Clayton, Manchester, 1863–66
  - St Margaret's parish church, Mapledurham, Oxfordshire: restoration, 1863
  - St Mary Magdalene church, Enfield Chase, Middlesex, 1883
  - St Michael's parish church, Aldbourne, Wiltshire: restoration, 1863–67
- 1864
  - St Sebastian, Heathland, Wokingham, Berkshire, 1864
  - Merton College, Oxford: Grove Building, 1864
  - St Andrew's parish church, Blunsdon St Andrew, Wiltshire: restoration: 1864–68
  - Christ Church, Emery Down, Hampshire, 1864
- 1865
  - St George's parish church, Wootton, Northamptonshire: restoration, 1865
  - St Lawrence's Church, Godmersham, Kent: restoration, 1865
  - St Augustine's, Queen's Gate, London, 1865
  - St Augustine's parish church, Penarth, Glamorgan, 1865–66.
  - SS. Peter & Paul parish church, Heytesbury, Wiltshire: restoration, 1865–67
  - Holy Saviour church, Hitchin, Hertfordshire, 1865
- 1866
  - St Anne's church, Dropmore, Littleworth, Buckinghamshire, 1866
  - All Saints' parish church, Rangemore, Staffordshire, 1866–67
  - St Peter's parish church, Highway, Wiltshire, 1866–67
- 1867
  - Holy Trinity Chapel, Known as the 'Tait Chapel', Fulham Palace, London.
  - St Barnabas' parish church, Horton-cum-Studley, Oxfordshire, 1867
  - St Mary's parish church, Beech Hill, Berkshire, 1867
  - Little Faringdon, Oxfordshire: Rectory, 1867
  - St Mary's parish, Lower Heyford, Oxfordshire: remodelling of Old Rectory, 1867 (now Tall Chimneys)
- 1868
  - The Royal Hampshire County Hospital, Winchester, Hampshire, 1868
  - St John's Church, Dalton, North Yorkshire
  - St Paul's Church, Wooburn, Buckinghamshire: alterations, 1869
- 1869
  - St Alban the Martyr church, Holborn, London, 1862;
  - St Mary Brookfield, Dartmouth Park Road, Tufnell Park, London NW5, 1869–75
  - St Peter's Cathedral, Adelaide, South Australia, 1869–1902
- 1870
  - All Saints' parish church, Whiteparish, Wiltshire: restoration, 1870
  - St Leonard's parish church, Broad Blunsdon, Wiltshire: rebuilding, 1870
  - Church of St Peter, Great Berkhamsted, Hertfordshire: restoration, 1870–71
  - The Rectory (now Butterfield House), formerly attached to Church of St Mary the Virgin, Baldock, Hitchin Street, Baldock, Hertfordshire, 1870–1873
- 1871
  - St Margaret of Antioch, Barley, Hertfordshire, 1871 additions
  - St Paul's, Covent Garden, London, 1871–2: interior alterations
- 1872
  - St Mary's Church, Milstead, Kent: restoration, 1872
  - St Mary's parish church, Purton, Wiltshire: restoration, 1872
  - Saint Mary at Stoke parish church, Ipswich, Suffolk, 1872
- 1873
  - St Michael and All Angels' parish church & school, Poulton, Gloucestershire, 1873
  - St Mary's parish church, Dinton, Wiltshire: restoration, 1873–75
  - Church of St Peter, Clyffe Pypard, Wiltshire: restoration, 1873–75
- 1874
  - All Saints' parish church, Braunston, Northamptonshire: restoration, 1874
  - All Saints' church, Babbacombe, Devon 1874
  - St Denis' church, East Hatley, Cambridgeshire: restoration, 1874
  - St George's parish church, West Harnham, Salisbury, Wiltshire: restoration, 1874
  - St George's Church, Morebath 1874–75
  - St Mary's School, Wantage, Berkshire (now Oxfordshire), 1874–75
  - St Margaret's parish church, Knook, Wiltshire: restoration, 1874–76
- 1875
  - Rugby School, Warwickshire: Chapel and Quadrangle, 1875
  - Shaw-cum-Donnington School, Shaw, Berkshire, 1875
  - All Hallows Church, Tottenham, London: restoration, 1875-1877
- 1876
  - Keble College, Oxford 1876
  - St Andrew's Church, Buckland, Kent: restoration, 1876
  - Holy Cross parish church, Ashton Keynes, Wiltshire: restoration: 1876–77
  - St Catherine's parish church, Netherhampton, Wiltshire, 1876–77
- 1877
  - Ascot Priory, Ascot, Berkshire: chapel, 1877
  - St Andrew's parish church, Rugby, Warwickshire, 1877 with later additions of 1895
  - St James' church, Christleton, Cheshire, rebuilt 1877
- 1878
  - Exeter School, Exeter, Devon, 1878–1880
  - St Mary Magdalene parish church, Winterbourne Monkton, Wiltshire: rebuilding, 1878
  - St John the Baptist parish church, Foxham, Wiltshire: 1878–81
  - St John the Evangelist church, Clevedon, Somerset, 1878
  - St Mary's parish church, Donnington, Berkshire: chancel, 1878
  - St Mary's Convent, Wantage, Berkshire (now Oxfordshire): Noviciate, 1878
  - St Mary's parish church, Dodford, Northamptonshire: restoration, 1878–80
- 1880
  - St Columba's College Chapel, Whitechurch, County Dublin, Ireland, 1880
  - St Edith of Wilton parish church, Baverstock Lane, Dinton, Wiltshire: restoration 1880–93
  - St Paul's Cathedral, Melbourne (except main tower and spire), Australia, 1880–1891
- 1881
  - Sarum College, Salisbury, Wiltshire: chapel, 1881
- 1885
  - St John the Baptist's Church, Ault Hucknall Restoration 1885–89.
  - Gordon's School, Surrey, designed the central buildings comprising the Assembly Hall and Reception Building together with the sanatorium and dormitories.
- 1888
  - St Michael's Church, Woolwich: nave, 1888
- 1891
  - St Mark's Church, Dundela, Belfast, Northern Ireland, 1878 with later additions of 1891
- 1892
  - St Augustin's Church, Bournemouth
- 1895
  - St Andrew's parish church, Rugby, Warwickshire, 1877 with later additions of 1895
- Awaiting date
  - Ottery St Mary parish church, Devon: south transept refurbishment and marble font
  - St Mawgan Old Rectory, Cornwall
  - St Peter's Church, Bont Goch, Ceredigion

== Publications ==
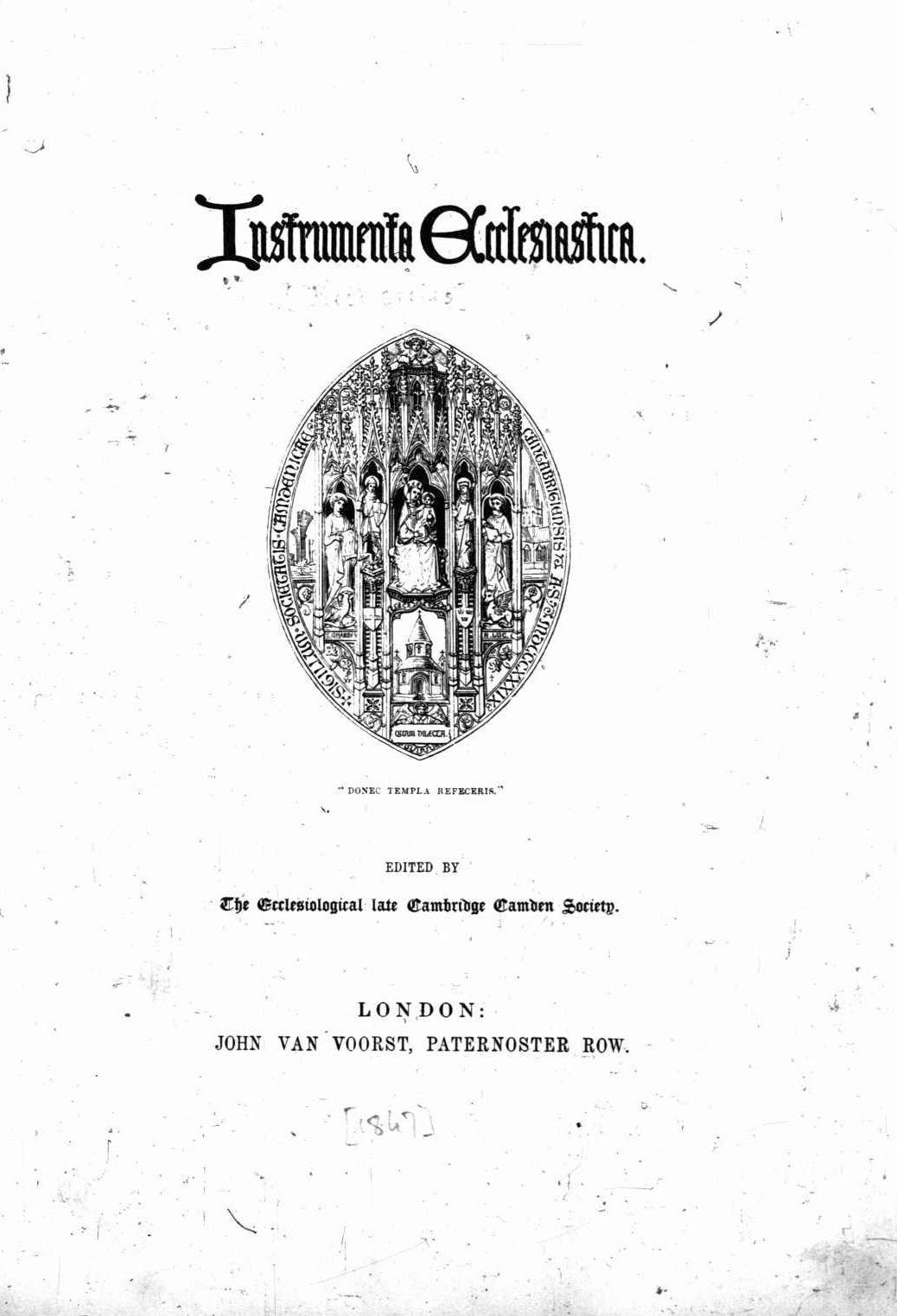
Instrumenta Ecclesiastica, 1847

- Ecclesiological late Cambridge Camden Society, ed. (1847). Instrumenta Ecclesiastica (in Latin). with etchings from drawings by William Butterfield. London: Ecclesiological late Cambridge Camden Society – via John Van Voorst.
