= Samuel Martin (Pontefract MP) =

Anglo-Irish politician and judge

Sir Samuel Martin QC (1801 – 9 January 1883) was an Anglo-Irish politician and judge.

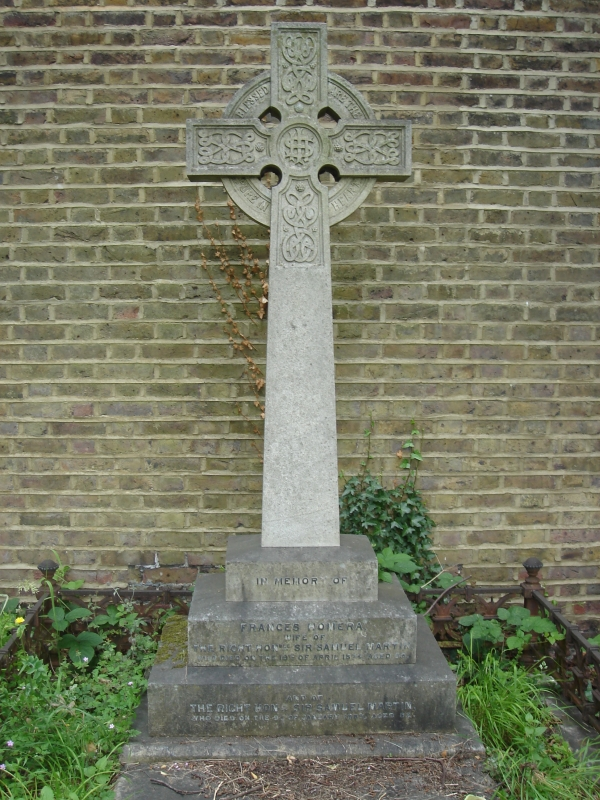
Funerary monument, Brompton Cemetery, London

== Early life and education ==
Martin was born in 1801, the son of Samuel Martin of Calmore, County Londonderry. He was educated at Trinity College Dublin, receiving a BA in 1821 and an MA in 1832. He became a student at Gray's Inn in 1821 and practiced as a special pleader. He transferred to the Middle Temple in 1826, and was called to the bar in 1830.

In 1838, he married Frances Homera, the daughter of Sir Frederick Pollock, Lord Chief Baron of the Exchequer. She died on 19 April 1874, aged 56.

== Career ==
Martin was active as a barrister on the Northern Circuit, and gained a reputation for skill. He took silk in 1845. He entered the House of Commons for Pontefract in 1847 as a Liberal, after a closely fought contest. However, he only held the seat until 1850, when he was knighted and appointed a Baron of the Exchequer. He received an LL.D. from Trinity in 1857.

== Later life ==
Martin left the Exchequer bench in 1873, due to deafness, and was appointed a Privy Counsellor on 2 February 1874. He returned to the Middle Temple in 1878. He divided his time between his estate at Myroe, County Londonderry (where he was a justice of the peace and a deputy lieutenant) and his London residence in Piccadilly. He died at the latter in 1883 and is buried in Brompton Cemetery, London.

== Arms ==
Coat of arms of Samuel Martin

Crest
An estoile of six points Argent.
Escutcheon
Argent on a chief indented Azure three martlets Or.

Parliament of the United Kingdom
Preceded by Richard Monckton Milnes; Viscount Pollington	Member of Parliament for Pontefract; 1847–1851; With: Richard Monckton Milnes	Succeeded by Richard Monckton Milnes; Beilby Richard Lawley
