= Knottingley Town Hall =

Municipal building in Knottingley, West Yorkshire, England

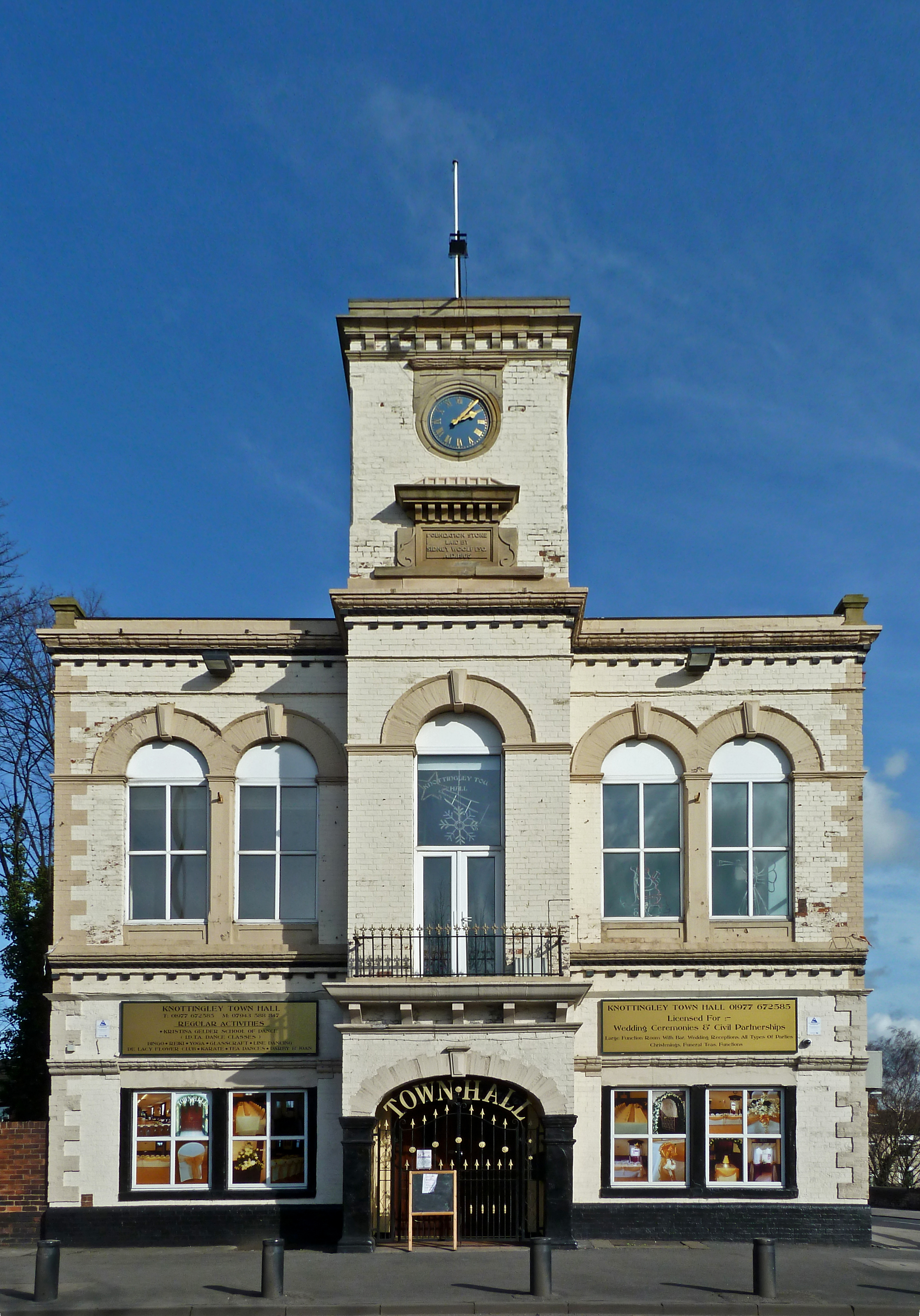
- Knottingley Town Hall

- Shown in West Yorkshire
- 53.7095°N 1.2438°W
- Location: Weeland Road, Knottingley

History
- Built: 1865

Site notes
- Architect(s): Shaw and Weightman
- Architectural style: Italianate style

Knottingley Town Hall is a municipal building in Weeland Road, Knottingley, West Yorkshire, England. The structure, which served as the headquarters of Knottingley Urban District Council, now operates as a community centre.

== History ==
The building was commissioned on the initiative of a group of local businessmen who formed a private company to raise the finance needed to erect a town hall. The initiative was led by the proprietor of Ferrybridge Potteries, Sidney Woolf, who became chairman of the company. The site they selected had once been occupied by a monastery dating back to the 7th century.

The foundation stone for the new building was laid by Sidney Woolf on 29 June 1865. It was designed by Shaw and Weightman in the Italianate style, built by John Stanhope in brick at a cost of £2,400 and was officially opened on 15 September 1865. The design involved a symmetrical main frontage with five bays facing onto Weeland Road; the central bay, which slightly projected forward, featured a wide arched doorway with wrought iron gates flanked by Doric order pilasters on the ground floor, a French door with a wrought iron balcony on the first floor and, above that, a tower which was surmounted by a modillioned cornice and, originally, by a pyramid-shaped roof. The other bays were fenestrated by square headed cross windows on the ground floor and by round headed cross windows on the first floor. Internally, the principal rooms were the assembly hall on the first floor and the suite of rooms that formed the local mechanics' institute on the ground floor.

The building also accommodated the offices of the local Poor Law Union from September 1868. It became a popular local events venue and functions hosted at the town hall included a performance of the oratorio, the Messiah by Handel, in January 1870: the event was attended the local member of parliament and First Lord of the Admiralty, Hugh Childers. In March 1874, the town hall was the venue of the so-called vestry riots in which different political factions argued over the merits and de-merits of local publicly funded education and, ultimately, destroyed the vestry table at which the discussion took place.

Following significant population growth, largely associated with the glass-making industry, the area became an urban district in 1894. After the company which owned the building got into financial difficulty, the proprietor of the Aire Tar Works, George Limnell Lyon, acquired the building at auction and presented it to the new council at a nominal cost in 1902 and, following the closure of the mechanics' institute, the ground floor rooms were converted for use as a council chamber in 1904. A war memorial, in the form of a statue of a flying angel on a pedestal, intended to commemorate the lives of service personnel who had died in the First World War, was installed to the north of the town hall in the early 1920s.

The town hall continued to serve as the headquarters of Knottingley Urban District Council until the council relocated to new offices at The Close in Hill Top in the late 1960s. The management of the town hall and the raising of income from room hire became the responsibility of a committee of volunteers in February 1976 and a clock was installed on the face of the tower in spring 1994. Following the closure of Kellingley Colliery, the last deep coal mine in the UK, the last miners, their families and many former miners marched from the town hall to the local social club in December 2015.
