= 1872 Pontefract by-election =

UK Parliamentary by-election

- 15 August 1872

Pontefract constituency
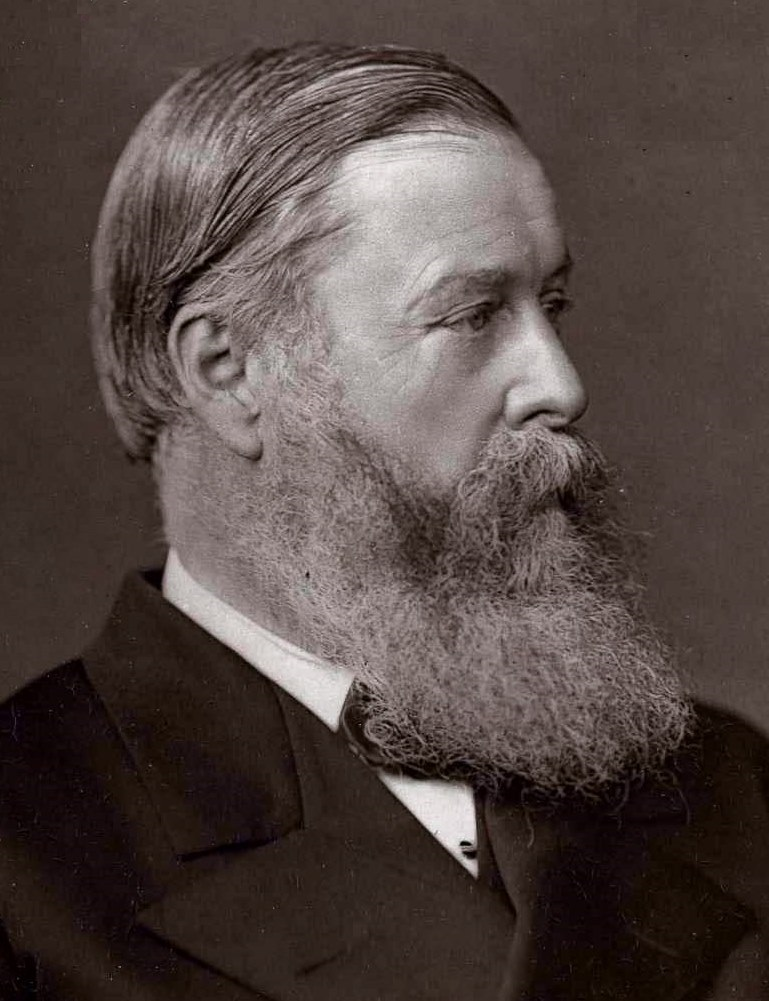
Candidate	Hugh Childers	John Horace Savile
Party	Liberal	Conservative

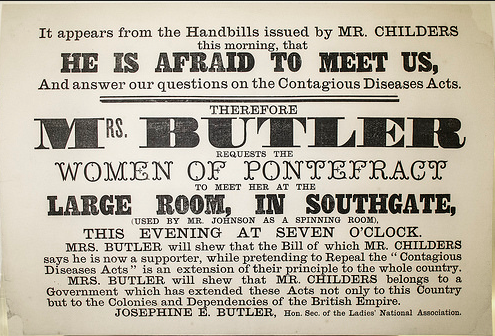
Notice printed during the 1872 Pontefract by-election campaign, calling for the repeal of the Contagious Diseases Acts and attacking Hugh Childers.

The 1872 Pontefract by-election was held on 15 August 1872 after the incumbent Liberal MP, Hugh Childers, became Chancellor of the Duchy of Lancaster and Paymaster General. It was retained by Childers.

It was the first UK Parliamentary election that was held by secret ballot held shortly after the Ballot Act 1872 ended the old practice of open voting had come into effect. There was considerable interest in the outcome, of the possibility that support for the rival politicians might be drastically different as voters were able to make their choice in secret. However, the election results were reflective of the political preference of the constituency prior to the Ballot Act 1872. One of the main arguments made in support of voting by ballot was that it would put a stop to the riots and disorders so prevalent at previous elections. The Pontefract election conclusively proved that secret voting reduced riotous behaviour. Hugh Childers was re-elected on 15 August 1872 following his appointment as Chancellor of the Duchy of Lancaster.

The Pontefract museum holds the original ballot box, sealed in wax with a Pontefract cake liquorice stamp.

== Result ==
Candidate	Party	Votes	%
Hugh Childers	Liberal Party	658	53.24
John Horace Savile, 5th Earl of Mexborough	Conservative Party	578	46.76
Total		1,236	100.00
Total votes		1,236	–
Registered voters/turnout		1,941	63.68
