= 1868 Pontefract by-election =

UK parliamentary by-election

The 1868 Pontefract by-election was held on 21 December 1868. The by-election was held due to the incumbent Liberal MP, Hugh Childers, becoming First Lord of the Admiralty. It was retained by Childers who was unopposed.
