= Thomas Sotheron-Estcourt =

Thomas Sotheron-Estcourt may refer to:

- T. H. S. Sotheron-Estcourt (Thomas Henry Sutton Sotheron-Estcourt, 1801–1876), British Conservative Party politician and Home Secretary
- Thomas E. Sotheron-Estcourt (1881–1958), British Conservative Member of Parliament 1931–1935

== See also ==
- Thomas Estcourt (disambiguation)
