= Rowland Winn, 2nd Baron St Oswald =

Rowland Winn
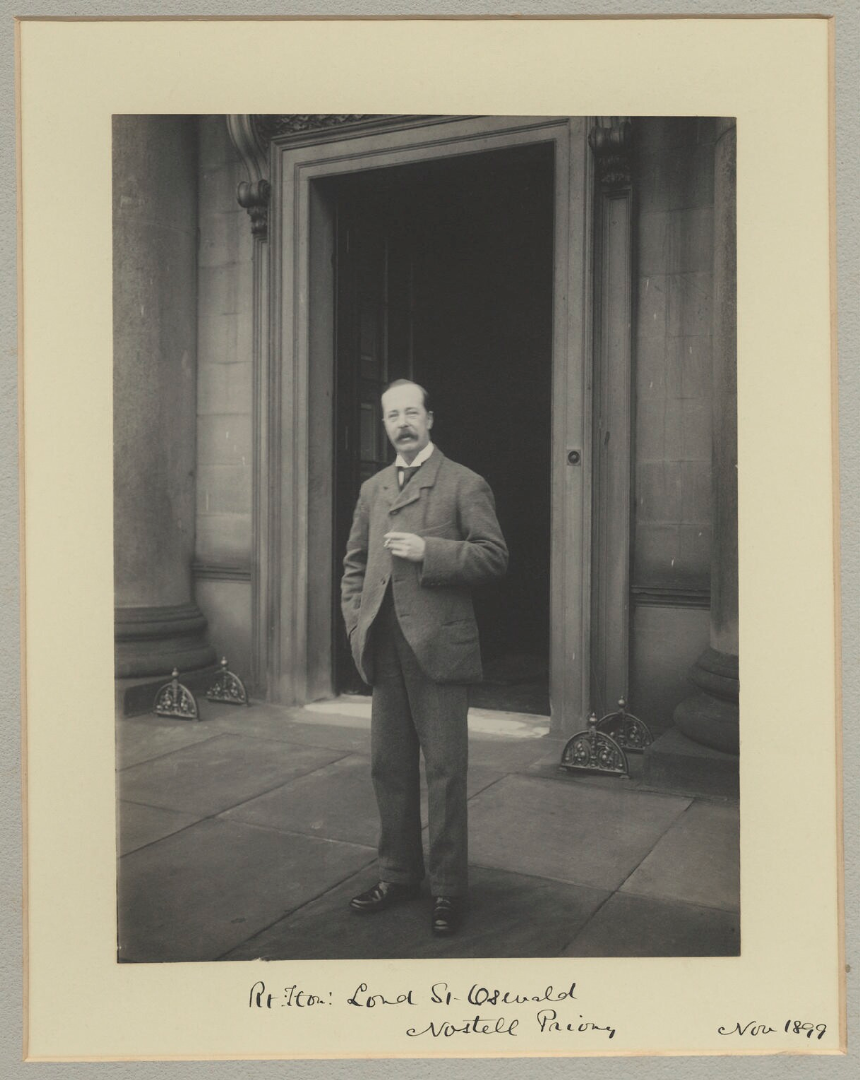

2nd Baron St Oswald
- In office 1893–1919

Member of the British Parliament for Pontefract
- In office 1885–1893

Personal details
- Born: 1 August 1857
- Died: 13 April 1919
- Spouse: Mabel Susan Forbes
- Children: 5, including Rowland George Winn
- Parent: Rowland Winn, 1st Baron St Oswald (father)

Rowland Winn, 2nd Baron St Oswald (1 August 1857 – 13 April 1919) was a Conservative Party politician in England.

At the 1885 general election, he was elected as Member of Parliament for Pontefract in Yorkshire. He held the seat until his father's death in 1893, when he succeeded to the peerage as Baron St Oswald.

He married Mabel Susan Forbes in October 1892. Their eldest son Rowland George Winn became 3rd Baron St Oswald.

Coat of arms of Rowland Winn, 2nd Baron St Oswald
Crest A demi-eagle displayed Or ducally gorged Ermine. Escutcheon Ermine on a fess Vert three eagles displayed Or. Supporters Two dragons reguardant Vert each gorged with a ribbon Or pendant therefrom an escutcheon Gules charged with a rose Argent. Motto Tout Pour Dieu Et Ma Patrie (Everything For God and My Fatherland)

== Notes ==
Parliament of the United Kingdom
Preceded by Hugh Childers and Sidney Woolf	Member of Parliament for Pontefract; 1885–1893	Succeeded by Harold James Reckitt
Peerage of the United Kingdom
Preceded by Rowland Winn	Baron St Oswald; 1893–1919	Succeeded by Rowland George Winn
