= William Overend =

British politician

Member of Parliament for Pontefract
- In office 29 April 1859 – 13 December 1859 Serving with Richard Monckton Milnes
- Preceded by: Richard Monckton Milnes; William Wood
- Succeeded by: Richard Monckton Milnes; Hugh Childers

Personal details
- Born: 1809
- Died: 24 December 1884 (aged 75)
- Party: Conservative

William Overend (1809 – 24 December 1884) was a British Conservative politician.

After unsuccessful standing for election at Sheffield in 1852 and 1857, Overend was first elected Conservative MP for Pontefract in 1859. However, he resigned later that year by becoming the Steward of the Manor of Hempholme.

Parliament of the United Kingdom
Preceded by Richard Monckton Milnes; William Wood	Member of Parliament for Pontefract; 1859–1860; With: Richard Monckton Milnes	Succeeded by Richard Monckton Milnes; Hugh Childers
