= Sir Richard Beaumont, 1st Baronet =

English politician

Sir Richard Beaumont, 1st Baronet JP (2 August 1574 – 28 October 1631) was an English politician who sat in the House of Commons in 1625.

Beaumont was a son of Edward Beaumont and Elizabeth Ramsden, daughter of John Ramsden. He was knighted by James I of England in 1609. In 1613, he commanded two hundred train-band soldiers per commission. Two years later he was a justice of the peace of the County of York. In 1625 Beaumont was elected Member of Parliament (MP) for Pontefract in the Useless Parliament. On 15 August 1628 Charles I created him a baronet, of Whitley, in the County of York.

He built the stately home, Whitley Beaumont near Huddersfield, West Yorkshire.

Beaumont died unmarried and with his death the baronetcy became extinct.

Parliament of England
Preceded by Sir Thomas Wentworth; Sir John Jackson	Member of Parliament for Pontefract; 1625; With: Sir John Jackson	Succeeded by Sir John Jackson; Sir Francis Foljambe, 1st Baronet 1626
Baronetage of England
New creation	Baronet (of Whitley); 1628–1631	Extinct
