= Florence Henniker =

British poet and novelist

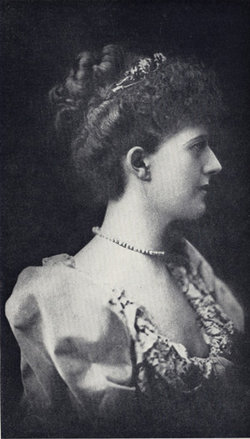
English novelist Florence Henniker in 1893

Florence Henniker born Florence Hungerford Milnes (December 1855 – 4 April 1923) was a British aristocrat, poet and novelist. She was also an animal rights activist and anti-vivisectionist.

== Biography ==
Florence Ellen Hungerford Milnes was born in December 1855 in London. The daughter of Richard Monckton Milnes, 1st Baron Houghton, and his wife, the former Annabella Hungerford Crewe, she was raised in luxury. She was named in memory of her father's frustrated love affair with the Crimean War nurse Florence Nightingale, a family friend who also was her godmother. She grew up in Fryston Hall, Yorkshire and due to her father's status in Middlesex County, Florence Milnes was considered to be an aristocrat.

She was educated at home with her elder sister Amicia at the family seat at Fryston Hall in Yorkshire and at Torquay where she, her sister Amicia and their brother Robert stayed with her father's aunts Jane, Louisa and Caroline Milnes. The social circle of her father extended to a number of writers who she knew in her formative years including William Makepeace Thackeray, Algernon Charles Swinburne. As a young woman Florence also spent time in Paris with her governess Matilda Allen, where she received singing lessons and attended lectures at the Sorbonne.

In 1882, she married a British army officer, Arthur Henry Henniker-Major (1855–1912) from Suffolk. In 1911, she resided at 13 Stratford Place, West in St. Marylebone, London with her husband and eight servants. Her life as a military wife inspired many of her literary works. Henniker died from heart failure in 1923. She was buried at St. Mary Magdalene, Thornham Magna.

=== Literary career ===
==== Poetry ====
Demonstrating her familiarity with European literature, in 1889, she published five pieces of poetry collectively entitled "Poesies from Abroad," one translated "from the Spanish of Gustave Becquer," one "from the German of Heinrich Heine," two written "after Sully Prudhomme," and one after "Théophile Gautier," entitled "Affinity," which was widely republished by itself in magazines such as Littell's Living Age and Current Literature. She also published "Autumn Lyric" in Blackwood's that same year. In 1890, Henniker published the poem "Alone."

==== Novels ====
Her first novel, Sir George, was published in 1891, originating one of Henniker's most enduring themes across her corpus, that of heterosexual romantic love failing due to the necessity for strengthening homosocial bonds between men in order to maintain patriarchal social order and control over property and women. Bid Me Good-bye (1892) tells the story of a heroine, Mary Gifford, whose four suitors all prove unacceptable, leaving her single at the novel's conclusion, and liberated. Perhaps Henniker's most daring work, Foiled (1893) depicts a glutted English aristocracy on the verge of collapse, feminizes some of her masculine characters and over-masculinizes others, and presents a society in which men and women live in irretrievably separate spheres. Even when heterosexual marriage does occur, it functions as a socially appropriate, but uncomfortable proxy for tabooed homosexual and incestuous love. Two collections of short stories were published in this period, Outlines (1894) and Contrasts (1903), which included a collaboration with novelist Thomas Hardy. In Sowing the Sand (1898), Henniker makes the case that the advent of romantic love spoils the joys of youth for both boys and girls. Harking back to 18th century novel conventions, Henniker wrote Our Fatal Shadows (1907) as a story told through a series of letters, leading Justin McCarthy of The Independent to term it, "One of the most remarkable novels given to the world here for some time in this age of novel writing." Her final novel was Second Fiddle (1912), which Coulson Kernahan claimed pictures, "truthfully, the fashionable life which has been written about, preached about, gossiped about, and gasped about in the books, sermons, and plays that profess to portray the "Sins of Society."

==== Other activities ====
Henniker was elected as the president of the Society of Women Journalists in 1896.

=== Relationship with Thomas Hardy ===
In May 1893, while hosting a party at Dublin Castle, her brother's residence as Lord Lieutenant of Ireland, she met Thomas Hardy, whom her father had known since 1880. She would remain friends with Hardy for the rest of her life, although she rejected his sexual advances. They collaborated on a short story "The Spectre of the Real," first published in 1894. Hardy wrote Henniker countless amounts of letters after the passing of his first wife, Emma, and their relationship was extremely complicated.

Edited by Evelyn Hardy and F.B. Pinion, Hardy's letters to Henniker were published in 1972 under the title One Rare Fair Woman.

Roger Ebbatson's "The Authorial Double: Hardy and Florence Henniker" comments on the collaborative work of Hardy and Henniker, seeing "The Spectre of the Real" as a tug-of-war between a male and female collaborator, the first insisting on dictating the plot and ending, leaving the latter to submissively "fill in the detail," irritating Henniker. Until 1896, the piece appeared exclusively under Hardy's name, without reference to Henniker. Negative reactions to the morbid subject matter when her name was revealed as co-author threatened to compromise Henniker's social status and alienate her usual literary audience, which was drastically different to Hardy's demographic and morally opposed to his usual literary themes.

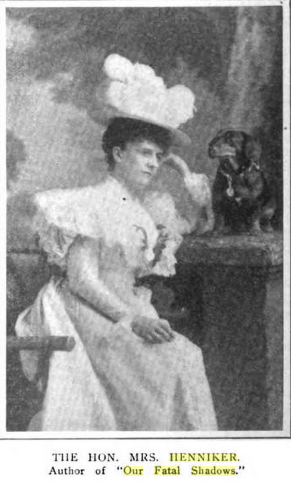
The Hon. Mrs. Henniker Author of "Our Fatal Shadows" in 1907.

=== Literary legacy ===
Her authorship played a prominent role in the "feminisation" of all literary works on the market during that time. In 1898, the Spectator described her novel Sowing the Sand as a book "conform[ing] generally to the type long ago established by Ouida, which in our young days used to be accounted improper, but is now food for babes." Reviewing her collection of short stories Contrasts in 1903, the same magazine said its contents showed "much insight into character, and an almost inhuman power of devising heartrending situations in everyday life."

However, Richard Sylva (Eastern Illinois University) has claimed that in contemporary times, owing to Henniker's collaboration with Hardy, which overshadowed her own writing career, modernist literature overtaking the romance novel genre in terms of being considered high art, and exclusion from the Dictionary of National Biography, Henniker would be virtually unknown except for her connection to "three well-known men...her father, Lord Houghton, her brother...later second Lord Houghton, and her literary collaborator and rejected paramour, Thomas Hardy."

=== Animal rights ===
Henniker was an activist for animal rights, anti-vivisection, the protection of warhorses and was an opponent of the plume-trade. She was a member of the Committee of the Animals' Institute located on Kinnerton Street, Wilton Place. She was also a member of the National Anti-Vivisection Society and attended their meetings in London. She wrote for The Animals' Friend magazine.

== Selected works ==
- Sir George (1891)
- Bid Me Good-bye (1892)
- Foiled (1893)
- Outlines [short stories] (1894)
- In Scarlet and Grey [short stories] with The Spectre of the Real by Thomas Hardy and Florence Henniker (1896)
- Sowing the Sand (1898)
- Contrasts [short stories] (1903)
- Our Fatal Shadows (1907)
- Second Fiddle (1912)

Her play The Courage of Silence was produced in 1905. She edited Arthur Henniker: A Little Book for his Friends (1912), which included an uncollected poem by Thomas Hardy: "A.H., 1855-1912".
