= Adam Hills (politician) =

English politician (1880–1941)

Member of Parliament for Pontefract
- In office 1935–1941
- Preceded by: Thomas E. Sotheron-Estcourt
- Succeeded by: Percy Barstow

Personal details
- Born: 10 August 1880
- Died: 1 June 1941 (aged 60)
- Party: Labour Party
- Profession: Trade unionist, politician

Adam Hills (10 August 1880 – 1 June 1941) was a Labour Party politician in England.

Hills was active in the National Union of Railwaymen, and also the Labour Party, for which he was elected to Newcastle City Council in 1934. He was member of parliament (MP) for Pontefract from 1935 until his death in 1941 aged 60.

Parliament of the United Kingdom
Preceded by Thomas E. Sotheron-Estcourt	Member of Parliament for Pontefract; 1935–1941	Succeeded by Percy Barstow
