= Baron St Oswald =

Barony in the Peerage of the United Kingdom

Barony St Oswald
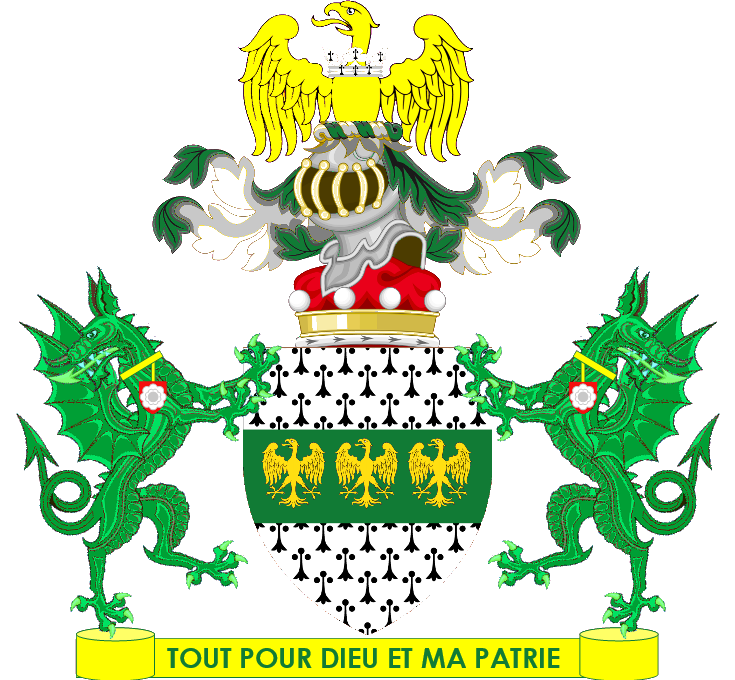
- Escutcheon: Ermine on a fess Vert three eagles displayed Or. Crest: A demi-eagle displayed Or ducally gorged Ermine. Supporters: Two dragons reguardant Vert each gorged with a ribbon Or pendant therefrom an escutcheon Gules charged with a rose Argent.
- Creation date: 3 July 1885
- Created by: Queen Victoria
- Peerage: United Kingdom
- First holder: Rowland Winn
- Present holder: Charles Winn
- Heir apparent: Rowland Winn
- Status: Extant
- Seat: Nostell Priory
- Motto: Tout Pour Dieu Et Ma Patrie (Everything For God and My Fatherland)

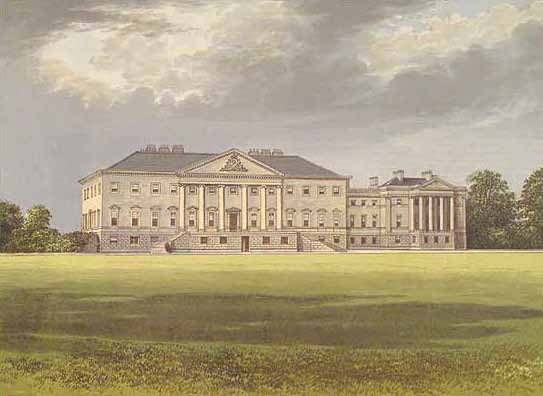
Nostell Priory in 1880.

Baron St Oswald, of Nostell in the West Riding of the County of York, is a title in the Peerage of the United Kingdom. It was created in 1885 for the industrialist and Conservative politician Rowland Winn, a former Member of Parliament for North Lincolnshire. His son, the second Baron, represented Pontefract in the House of Commons. His grandson, the fourth Baron, held junior ministerial positions in the Conservative administrations of Harold Macmillan and Alec Douglas-Home and also sat as a Member of the European Parliament. As of 2017 the title is held by the latter's nephew, the sixth Baron, who succeeded his father in 1999. He holds Freedom of the City of Wakefield

The family seat is Nostell Priory, near Crofton, West Yorkshire. The house was handed over to the National Trust in 1953 but is still the home of the Barons St Oswald.

== Barons St Oswald (1885) ==
- Rowland Winn, 1st Baron St Oswald (1820–1893)
- Rowland Winn, 2nd Baron St Oswald (1857–1919)
- Rowland George Winn, 3rd Baron St Oswald (1893–1957)
- Rowland Denys Guy Winn, 4th Baron St Oswald (1916–1984)
- Derek Edward Anthony Winn, 5th Baron St Oswald (1919–1999)
- Charles Rowland Andrew Winn, 6th Baron St Oswald (b. 1959)

The heir apparent is the present holder's son the Hon. Rowland Charles Sebastian Henry Winn (b. 1986)

Barons St Oswald line of succession
- Rowland Winn, 1st Baron Saint Oswald (1820–1893)
  - Rowland Winn, 2nd Baron Saint Oswald (1857–1919)
    - Rowland George Winn, 3rd Baron Saint Oswald (1893–1957)
      - Rowland Denys Guy Winn, 4th Baron Saint Oswald (1916–1984)
      - Derek Edward Anthony Winn, 5th Baron Saint Oswald (1919–1999)
        - Charles Rowland Andrew Winn, 6th Baron Saint Oswald (born 1959)
          - (1) Hon. Rowland Charles Sebastian Henry Winn (b. 1986)
    - Hon. Charles John Frederick Winn (1896–1968)
      - (2) Michael Peter Anthony Winn (b. 1933)
        - (3) Charles Michael Anthony Winn (b. 1967)
          - (4) Henry Charles Knowlton Winn (b. 2008)
  - Hon. Cecil Henry Winn (1866–1934)
    - Major Henry John Winn (1914–1991)
      - (5) Martin John Winn (b. 1961)
        - (6) Hugo John Winn (b. 1991)
  - Geoffrey Mark Victor Winn (1918–2008)
    - (7) Geoffrey George Winn-Darley (b. 1966)

== See also ==
- Baron Headley
