= Pontefract (constituency) =

Parliamentary constituency in the United Kingdom, 1885–1974

- Former borough constituency for the House of Commons

1295–1301
- Seats: 2

1621–1974
- Seats: 2 until 1885; 1 from 1885 to 1974
- Type of constituency: Borough constituency
- Replaced by: Pontefract and Castleford

Pontefract was an English parliamentary constituency centred on the town of Pontefract in the West Riding of Yorkshire, which returned two Members of Parliament to the House of Commons briefly in the 13th century and again from 1621 until 1885, and one member from 1885 to 1974.

== History ==
=== In the unreformed Parliaments (1295–1832) ===
Pontefract had representation in the Model Parliament of 1295, and in that which followed it in 1298, but gained a continuous franchise only from 1621. The constituency was a parliamentary borough, returning two members, consisting only of the town of Pontefract itself.

Until 1783, Pontefract was a burgage borough, where the right to vote was attached to the holders of about 325 specified properties in the borough. As in most burgage boroughs, the majority of the burgage tenements were concentrated in a small number of hands, giving their owners an effective stranglehold on the choice of representatives; but, since an individual could not vote more than once in person, however, many of the burgages he controlled, such a majority could only be exercised by conveying each of the properties to a reliable nominee at election time. In Pontefract the two chief landowners in the first half of the 18th century, George Morton Pitt and Lord Galway, owned between them a narrow majority of the burgages, but rather than putting in dummy voters to enforce their control they had preferred to reach an amicable settlement at each election with the remaining small burgage holders, who were mostly residents of the town. Consequently, the inhabitants generally had some voice in the choice of their MPs, as well as benefiting from the monetary outlay that the patrons expended to secure their goodwill.

However, in 1766 Pitt sold his burgages to John Walsh, who persuaded Galway to join him in abandoning canvassing and treating of the other voters, instead bringing in "faggot voters" to enforce their majority. At the next general election, in 1768, the indignant inhabitants put up their own candidates (Sir Rowland Winn and his brother), and a riot on polling day prevented the imported voters from reaching the polling booth. The election was declared void and Walsh's nominee duly returned at the by-election, but the townsmen refused to abandon their quest.

Defeated in 1774, when Charles James Fox stood as one of their candidates, they petitioned against the result, but the Commons upheld the burgage franchise. But in 1783, when they tried again, the Commons abandoned its usual practice of refusing to reconsider a decision on a constituency's franchise, and declared that the right to vote was properly vested in all the (male) resident householders; this remained the case for the final half-century of the unreformed Parliament.

By the time of the Great Reform Act 1832, roughly 800 householders qualified to vote, and 699 did so in the contested election of 1830; the borough at this period had a total population of just under 5,000. Nevertheless, Pontefract still classed as a pocket borough, where the Earl of Harewood had the effective power to choose one of its two MPs.

=== After the Reform Act 1832 ===
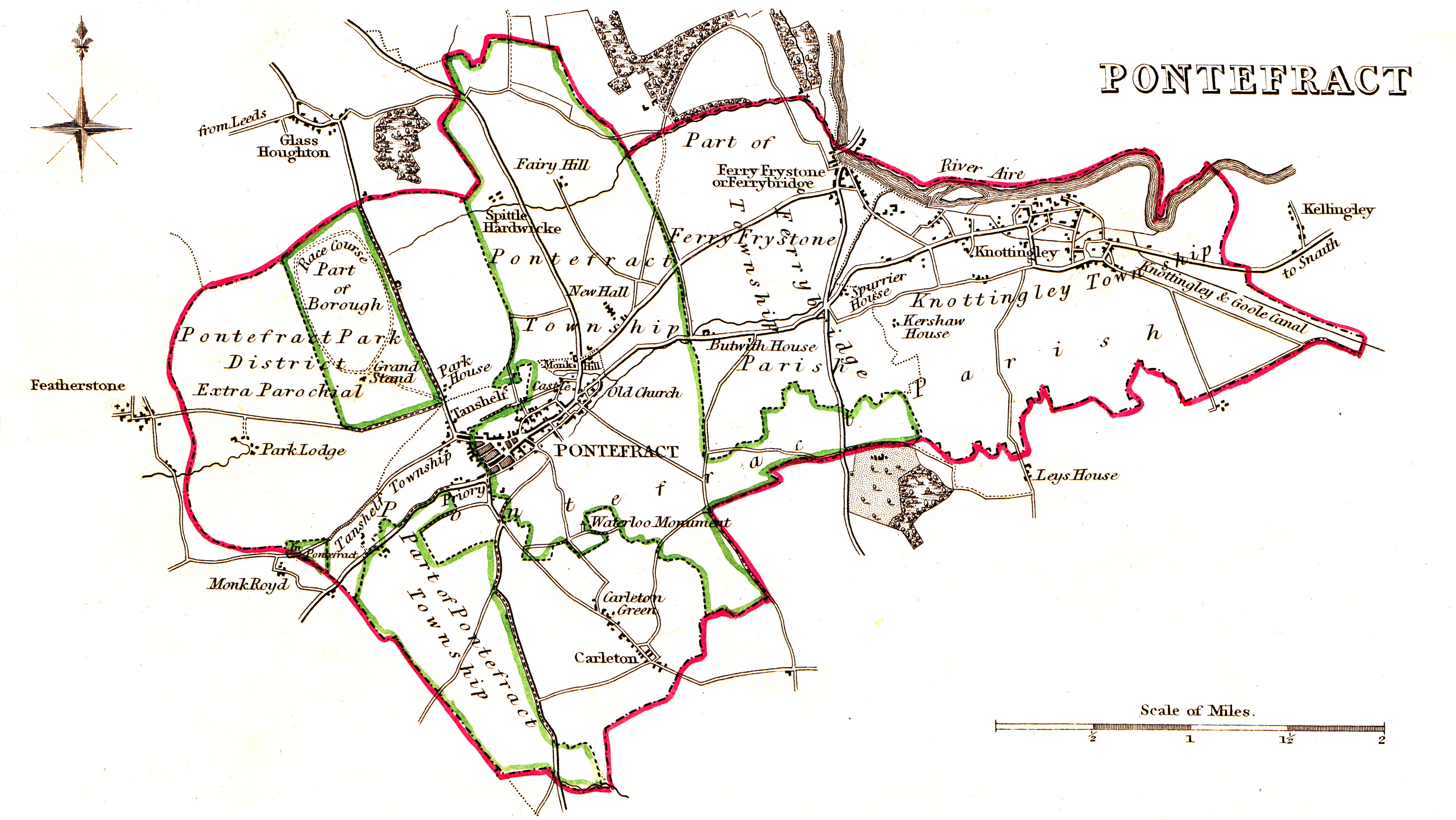
A map of the Parliamentary Borough of Pontefract as it existed before the Reform Act 1832 (in green) and after (in red)

The Reform Act 1832 extended the boundaries of the constituency, bringing in the neighbouring townships of Tanshelf, Monkhill, Knottingley, Ferrybridge and Carleton, as well as Pontefract Castle and Pontefract Park, which had previously been excluded. This doubled the population to just over 10,000, in 4,832 houses.

In 1872 Pontefract became the first British constituency to hold a parliamentary election by secret ballot, at a by-election held shortly after the act of Parliament ending the old practice of open voting had come into effect. There was considerable interest in the outcome, many observers believing that support for the parties might be drastically different once voters were able to make their choice in secret; but in the event the shares of the vote were much as they had been at the previous general election. Hugh Childers was re-elected on 15 August 1872 following his appointment as Chancellor of the Duchy of Lancaster. The Pontefract museum holds the original ballot box, sealed in wax with a liquorice stamp.

The third Reform Act, which came into effect at the general election of 1885, reduced Pontefract's representation from two members to one, though the boundaries remained essentially unchanged. In 1918, Pontefract became a county constituency, with boundaries extended to cover a much wider area – Pontefract itself, the towns of Knottingley and Goole, and the Pontefract and Goole rural districts.

At the 1950 general election Pontefract regained its borough status, being redrawn as a wholly urban constituency consisting of Pontefract, Castleford and Featherstone. From February 1974, the constituency was renamed Pontefract and Castleford, although its composition remained unchanged.

== Members of Parliament ==
=== 1621–1640 ===
Parliament	First member	Second member
Right to return members restored, 1621
1621	George Shilleto	Sir Edwin Sandys, jnr
1623	Sir Henry Holcroft (Note: Holcroft also stood for Stockbridge, winning both but chose to represent Stockbridge so a writ was issued to elect another MP for Pontefract.)	Sir Thomas Wentworth
1623	Sir John Jackson	Sir Thomas Wentworth
1625	Sir John Jackson	Richard Beaumont
1626	Sir John Jackson	Sir Francis Foljambe, 1st Baronet
1628	Sir John Ramsden	Sir John Jackson
1629–1640	No Parliaments summoned	

=== 1640–1885 ===
Year	First member	First party	Second member	Second party
April 1640	John Ramsden	Royalist	Sir George Wentworth (1)	Royalist
November 1640	Sir George Wentworth (1)	Royalist	Sir George Wentworth (2)	Royalist
September 1642	Wentworth disabled to sit – seat vacant (Note: Wentworth was disabled from sitting in the House of Commons for "disserting the service of the House and being in the King's quarters".)		Sir George Wentworth (2)	Royalist
January 1644	Wentworth disabled to sit – seat vacant		Wentworth disabled to sit – seat vacant	
1645	Henry Arthington		Wentworth disabled to sit – seat vacant	
1646	Henry Arthington		William White	
1653	Pontefract was unrepresented in the Barebones Parliament and the First and Second Parliaments of the Protectorate			
January 1659	John Hewley		John Lambert (Note: Lambert was also elected for Aldborough but chose to sit for Pontefract.)	
May 1659	William White		One seat vacant	
1660	William Lowther		Sir George Savile, Bt.	
1661	William Lowther		Sir John Dawnay	
1679	Sir Patience Ward		Sir John Dawnay	
1685	Sir Thomas Yarburgh		Sir John Dawnay	
1690	Henry Dawnay		Sir John Bland, Bt.	
1695	Sir William Lowther		Robert Monckton	
1698	Sir John Bland, Bt.		John Bright	
1701	Sir John Bland, Bt.		William Lowther	
1710	Sir John Bland, Bt.		Robert Frank	
1713	John Dawnay (Note: Dawnay had also been elected for Aldborough, but a petition against the result there had not been resolved by the time the Parliament was dissolved. Not being required to choose which constituency he would represent while there was an outstanding petition against one of the elections, he sat for both boroughs throughout the Parliament)		Robert Frank	
1716 (Note: At the general election of 1715, Dawnay and Frank were declared re-elected, but on petition the result was overturned and their opponents, Bethell and Lowther, seated in their place)	Sir William Lowther, 1st Baronet		Hugh Bethell	
1722	Sir William Lowther, 1st Baronet		John Lowther	
1729	Sir William Lowther, 2nd Baronet		John Lowther	
1730	Sir William Lowther, 2nd Baronet		John Mordaunt	
1734	Sir William Lowther, 2nd Baronet		John Monckton	
1741	George Morton Pitt		John Monckton	
1747	George Morton Pitt		William Monckton	
1749	George Morton Pitt		John Monckton	
1751	George Morton Pitt		Robert Monckton	
1754	William Monckton-Arundell		Sambrooke Freeman	
1761	William Monckton-Arundell		William Gerard Hamilton	
March 1768	William Monckton-Arundell		Sir Rowland Winn	
December 1768	William Monckton-Arundell		Henry Strachey	
1772	Henry Monckton-Arundell		Henry Strachey	
March 1774	Robert Monckton		Henry Strachey	
October 1774	Sir John Goodricke, Bt.		Charles Mellish (Note: After an election petition, Mellish was declared elected in Pontefract as well as in Boroughbridge but chose to sit for Pontefract.)	
1780	William Nedham		Robert Monckton-Arundell	
February 1783	William Nedham		Nathaniel Smith	
April 1783	William Nedham		John Smyth	Whig
1784	William Sotheron		John Smyth	Whig
1796	Robert Monckton-Arundell		John Smyth	Whig
1802	Richard Benyon		John Smyth	Whig
1806	Robert Pemberton Milnes	Tory	John Smyth	Whig
1807	Robert Pemberton Milnes	Tory	John Savile	Tory
October 1812	Robert Pemberton Milnes	Tory	Henry Lascelles (Note: Lascelles was also elected for Yorkshire, which he chose to represent, and never sat for Pontefract)	Tory
December 1812	Robert Pemberton Milnes	Tory	John Savile	Tory
1818	Thomas Houldsworth	Tory	John Savile	Tory
1826	Thomas Houldsworth	Tory	Le Gendre Starkie	Tory
1830	Hon. Henry Stafford-Jerningham	Whig	Sir Culling Eardley, Bt.	Tory
1831	Hon. Henry Stafford-Jerningham	Whig	John Savile	Tory
1832	Hon. Henry Stafford-Jerningham	Whig	John Gully	Whig
1835	John Savile	Conservative	John Gully	Whig
1837	Richard Monckton Milnes	Conservative	William Stanley-Massey-Stanley	Whig
1841	Richard Monckton Milnes	Conservative	John Savile	Conservative
1847	Richard Monckton Milnes	Conservative	Samuel Martin	Whig
1851	Richard Monckton Milnes	Conservative	Hon. Beilby Lawley (Note: Lawley was ennobled as Baron Wenlock in May 1852 but no new writ was ordered.)	Whig
1852	Richard Monckton Milnes	Conservative	Benjamin Oliveira	Whig
1857	Richard Monckton Milnes	Whig	William Wood	Whig
1859	Richard Monckton Milnes	Liberal	William Overend	Conservative
1860	Richard Monckton Milnes	Liberal	Hugh Childers	Liberal
1863	Samuel Waterhouse	Conservative	Hugh Childers	Liberal
1880	Sidney Woolf	Liberal	Hugh Childers	Liberal
1885	Representation reduced to one member			

=== 1885–1974 ===
Election	Member	Party	Notes
1885	reduced to one member		
1885	Rowland Winn	Conservative	Succeeded to the peerage as Baron St Oswald
February 1893 by-election	Harold Reckitt	Liberal	Election voided
June 1893 by-election	Thomas Willans Nussey	Liberal	
1910	Handel Booth	Liberal	Contested Wentworth following redistribution
1918	Joseph Compton-Rickett	Coalition Liberal	Died July 1919
1919 by-election	Walter Forrest	Coalition Liberal	
Jan 1922	Walter Forrest	National Liberal	
Nov 1922	Tom Smith	Labour	
1924	Christopher Brooke	Unionist	
1929	Tom Smith	Labour	
1931	Thomas E. Sotheron-Estcourt	Conservative	
1935	Adam Hills	Labour	Died June 1941
1941 by-election	Percy Barstow	Labour	
1950	George Sylvester	Labour	Died October 1961
1962 by-election	Joe Harper	Labour	Contested Pontefract and Castleford following redistribution
Feb 1974	constituency abolished: see Pontefract & Castleford		

== Elections ==
=== Elections in the 1830s ===
General election 1830: Pontefract (2 seats)
Party	Candidate	Votes	%	±%
Tory	Culling Eardley Smith	529	41.4	
Whig	Henry Stafford-Jerningham	413	32.3	
Whig	Robert Torrens	337	26.3	
Turnout		699	c. 85.2	
Registered electors		c. 820		
Majority		116	9.1	
Tory hold		Swing		
Majority		76	6.0	N/A
Whig gain from Tory		Swing		

General election 1831: Pontefract (2 seats)
Party	Candidate	Votes	%
Tory	John Savile	Unopposed	
Whig	Henry Stafford-Jerningham	Unopposed	
Registered electors		c. 820	
Tory hold			
Whig hold			

General election 1832: Pontefract (2 seats)
Party	Candidate	Votes	%
Whig	Henry Stafford-Jerningham	Unopposed	
Whig	John Gully	Unopposed	
Registered electors		956	
Whig hold			
Whig gain from Tory			

General election 1835: Pontefract (2 seats)
Party	Candidate	Votes	%
Whig	John Gully	509	34.3
Conservative	John Savile	498	33.5
Whig	Alexander Raphael	478	32.2
Turnout		c. 743	c. 86.1
Registered electors		862	
Majority		11	0.8
Whig hold			
Majority		20	1.3
Conservative gain from Whig			

General election 1837: Pontefract (2 seats)
Party	Candidate	Votes	%	±%
Conservative	Richard Monckton Milnes	507	49.1	+15.6
Whig	Sir William Stanley-Massey-Stanley, 10th Baronet	403	39.0	+4.7
Whig	Culling Eardley Smith	123	11.9	−20.3
Conservative	Henry Gompertz	0	0.0	N/A
Turnout		679	85.4	c. −0.7
Registered electors		795		
Majority		104	10.1	+8.8
Conservative hold		Swing	+15.6	
Majority		280	27.1	+26.3
Whig hold		Swing	−1.6	

=== Elections in the 1840s ===
General election 1841: Pontefract (2 seats)
Party	Candidate	Votes	%	±%
Conservative	John Savile	464	40.3	−8.8
Conservative	Richard Monckton Milnes	433	37.7	+37.7
Whig	John Gully	253	22.0	−28.9
Majority		180	15.7	N/A
Turnout		632	88.8	+3.4
Registered electors		712		
Conservative hold		Swing	+2.8	
Conservative gain from Whig		Swing	+26.1	

General election 1847: Pontefract (2 seats)
Party	Candidate	Votes	%	±%
Whig	Samuel Martin	415	36.9	+14.9
Conservative	Richard Monckton Milnes	365	32.4	−5.3
Conservative	Thomas Henry Preston	346	30.7	−9.6
Majority		69	6.2	N/A
Turnout		563 (est)	82.2 (est)	−6.6
Registered electors		685		
Whig gain from Conservative		Swing	+14.9	
Conservative hold		Swing	−6.4	

=== Elections in the 1850s ===
Martin resigned after being appointed a judge of the Court of the Exchequer, causing a by-election.

By-election, 13 February 1851: Pontefract
Party	Candidate	Votes	%	±%
Whig	Beilby Lawley	427	78.8	+41.9
Conservative	John Savile	115	21.2	−41.9
Majority		312	57.6	+51.4
Turnout		542	80.3	−1.9
Registered electors		675		
Whig hold		Swing	+41.9	

General election 1852: Pontefract (2 seats)
Party	Candidate	Votes	%	±%
Conservative	Richard Monckton Milnes	433	39.9	+7.5
Whig	Benjamin Oliveira	338	31.2	−5.7
Conservative	William David Lewis	313	28.9	−1.8
Turnout		542 (est)	79.2 (est)	−3.0
Registered electors		684		
Majority		95	8.7	N/A
Conservative hold		Swing	+5.2	
Majority		25	2.3	−3.9
Whig hold		Swing	−5.7	

General election 1857: Pontefract (2 seats)
Party	Candidate	Votes	%	±%
Whig	Richard Monckton Milnes	439	38.8	−1.1
Whig	William Wood	374	33.0	N/A
Whig	Benjamin Oliveira	319	28.2	−0.7
Majority		65	5.8	+3.5
Turnout		566 (est)	80.3 (est)	+1.1
Registered electors		705		
Whig hold		Swing	N/A	
Whig gain from Conservative		Swing	N/A	

General election 1859: Pontefract (2 seats)
Party	Candidate	Votes	%	±%
Liberal	Richard Monckton Milnes	497	45.2	+6.4
Conservative	William Overend	306	27.8	New
Liberal	Hugh Childers	296	26.9	N/A
Turnout		550 (est)	78.4 (est)	−1.9
Registered electors		701		
Majority		191	17.4	+11.6
Liberal hold		Swing	N/A	
Majority		10	0.9	N/A
Conservative gain from Liberal		Swing	N/A	

=== Elections in the 1860s ===
Overend resigned, causing a by-election.

By-election, 31 January 1860: Pontefract
Party	Candidate	Votes	%	±%
Liberal	Hugh Childers	320	55.5	−16.6
Conservative	Samuel Waterhouse	257	44.5	+16.7
Majority		63	11.0	N/A
Turnout		577	83.7	+5.3
Registered electors		689		
Liberal gain from Conservative		Swing	−16.7	

Milnes was elevated to the peerage, becoming Lord Houghton and causing a by-election.

By-election, 3 August 1863: Pontefract
Party	Candidate	Votes	%	±%
Conservative	Samuel Waterhouse	Unopposed		
Conservative gain from Liberal				

Childers was appointed a Civil Lord of the Admiralty, causing a by-election.

By-election, 20 April 1864: Pontefract
Party	Candidate	Votes	%	±%
Liberal	Hugh Childers	Unopposed		
Liberal hold				

General election 1865: Pontefract (2 seats)
Party	Candidate	Votes	%	±%
Liberal	Hugh Childers	359	36.7	+9.8
Conservative	Samuel Waterhouse	330	33.8	+6.0
Liberal	William McArthur	288	29.5	−15.7
Turnout		654 (est)	93.5 (est)	+15.1
Registered electors		699		
Majority		29	2.9	−14.5
Liberal hold		Swing	+3.4	
Majority		42	4.3	+4.4
Conservative hold		Swing	+3.0	

General election 1868: Pontefract (2 seats)
Party	Candidate	Votes	%	±%
Liberal	Hugh Childers	913	36.6	−0.1
Conservative	Samuel Waterhouse	900	36.1	+2.3
Liberal	Charles Milnes Gaskell	680	27.3	−2.2
Turnout		1,697 (est)	88.8 (est)	−4.7
Registered electors		1,910		
Majority		13	0.5	−2.6
Liberal hold		Swing	−0.6	
Majority		220	8.8	+4.5
Conservative hold		Swing	+2.3	

Childers was appointed First Lord of the Admiralty, causing a by-election.

By-election, 21 December 1868: Pontefract
Party	Candidate	Votes	%	±%
Liberal	Hugh Childers	Unopposed		
Liberal hold				

=== Elections in the 1870s ===
Childers was appointed Chancellor of the Duchy of Lancaster, causing a by-election.

By-election, 17 Aug 1872: Pontefract (1 seat)
Party	Candidate	Votes	%	±%
Liberal	Hugh Childers	658	53.2	−10.7
Conservative	John Horace Savile, 5th Earl of Mexborough	578	46.8	+10.7
Majority		80	6.4	+5.9
Turnout		1,236	63.7	−25.1
Registered electors		1,941		
Liberal hold		Swing	−13.0	

General election 1874: Pontefract (2 seats)
Party	Candidate	Votes	%	±%
Liberal	Hugh Childers	934	37.3	+0.6
Conservative	Samuel Waterhouse	861	34.4	+0.6
Conservative	John Horace Savile, 5th Earl of Mexborough	709	28.3	−1.2
Turnout		1,719 (est)	84.3 (est)	−4.5
Registered electors		2,038		
Majority		73	2.9	+2.4
Liberal hold		Swing	+0.5	
Majority		152	6.1	−2.7
Conservative hold		Swing	0.0	

=== Elections in the 1880s ===
General election 1880: Pontefract (2 seats)
Party	Candidate	Votes	%	±%
Liberal	Hugh Childers	1,154	31.1	+12.4
Liberal	Sidney Woolf	1,029	27.7	+9.0
Conservative	Edward Green	904	24.3	−10.1
Conservative	John Shaw	627	16.9	−11.4
Majority		125	3.4	N/A
Turnout		1,857 (est)	76.5 (est)	−7.8
Registered electors		2,429		
Liberal hold		Swing	+11.9	
Liberal gain from Conservative		Swing	+9.6	

Childers was appointed Secretary of State for War, requiring a by-election.

By-election, 8 May 1880: Pontefract (1 seat)
Party	Candidate	Votes	%	±%
Liberal	Hugh Childers	Unopposed		
Liberal hold				

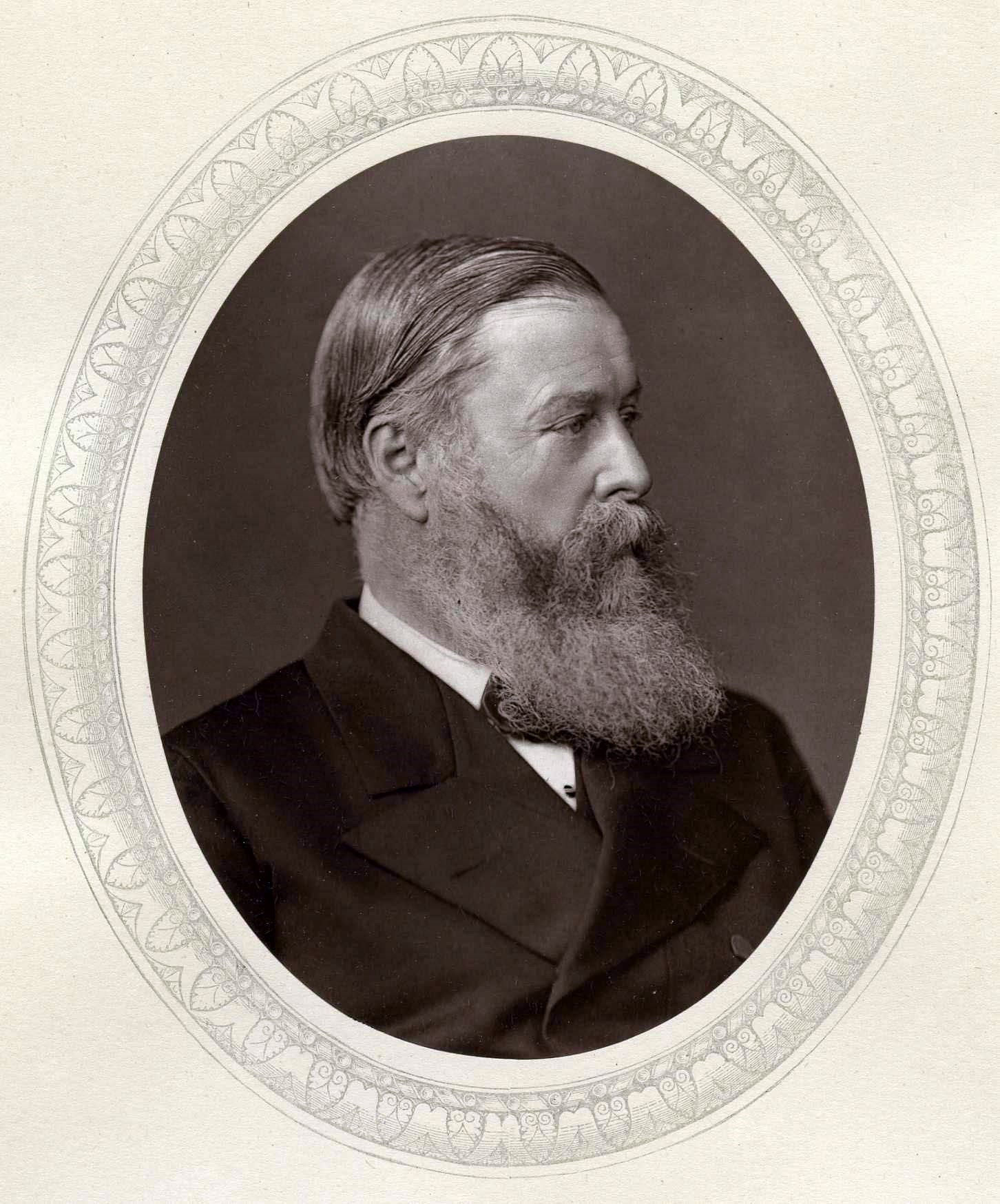
Hugh Childers

General election 1885: Pontefract
Party	Candidate	Votes	%	±%
Conservative	Rowland Winn	1,111	50.8	+9.6
Liberal	Hugh Childers	1,075	49.2	−9.6
Majority		36	1.6	N/A
Turnout		2,186	88.7	+12.2 (est)
Registered electors		2,465		
Conservative gain from Liberal		Swing	+9.6	

General election 1886: Pontefract
Party	Candidate	Votes	%	±%
Conservative	Rowland Winn	1,156	55.0	+4.2
Liberal	Charles James Fleming	947	45.0	−4.2
Majority		209	10.0	+8.4
Turnout		2,103	85.3	−3.4
Registered electors		2,465		
Conservative hold		Swing	+4.2	

=== Elections in the 1890s ===
General election 1892: Pontefract
Party	Candidate	Votes	%	±%
Conservative	Rowland Winn	1,132	50.9	−4.1
Liberal	Henry Smithson Lee Wilson	1,092	49.1	+4.1
Majority		40	1.8	−8.2
Turnout		2,224	88.3	+3.0
Registered electors		2,518		
Conservative hold		Swing	−4.1	

Winn succeeded to the peerage, becoming Lord St Oswald.

Harold Reckitt

February 1893 Pontefract by-election
Party	Candidate	Votes	%	±%
Liberal	Harold Reckitt	1,228	51.3	+2.2
Conservative	John Reginald Shaw	1,165	48.7	−2.2
Majority		63	2.6	N/A
Turnout		2,393	92.9	+4.6
Registered electors		2,575		
Liberal gain from Conservative		Swing	+2.2	

The by-election was declared void on petition, requiring a by-election.

T. W. Nussey

June 1893 Pontefract by-election
Party	Candidate	Votes	%	±%
Liberal	Thomas Willans Nussey	1,191	50.7	+1.6
Conservative	Elliott Lees	1,159	49.3	−1.6
Majority		32	1.4	N/A
Turnout		2,350	91.3	+3.0
Registered electors		2,575		
Liberal gain from Conservative		Swing	+1.6	

General election 1895: Pontefract
Party	Candidate	Votes	%	±%
Liberal	Thomas Willans Nussey	1,245	51.2	+2.1
Conservative	James Hope	1,188	48.8	−2.1
Majority		57	2.4	N/A
Turnout		2,433	89.4	+1.1
Registered electors		2,721		
Liberal gain from Conservative		Swing	+2.1	

=== Elections in the 1900s ===
General election 1900: Pontefract
Party	Candidate	Votes	%	±%
Liberal	Thomas Willans Nussey	1,385	52.2	+1.0
Conservative	Frederick Ripley	1,269	47.8	−1.0
Majority		116	4.4	+2.0
Turnout		2,654	88.3	−1.1
Registered electors		3,004		
Liberal hold		Swing	+1.0	

General election 1906: Pontefract
Party	Candidate	Votes	%	±%
Liberal	Thomas Willans Nussey	1,837	64.1	+11.9
Conservative	Charles Yate	1,030	35.9	−11.9
Majority		807	28.2	+23.8
Turnout		2,867	87.2	−1.1
Registered electors		3,288		
Liberal hold		Swing	+11.9	

=== Elections in the 1910s ===
General election January 1910: Pontefract
Party	Candidate	Votes	%	±%
Liberal	Thomas Willans Nussey	1,924	55.9	−8.2
Conservative	John Reginald Shaw	1,515	44.1	+8.2
Majority		409	11.8	−16.4
Turnout		3,439	93.9	+6.7
Registered electors		3,661		
Liberal hold		Swing	−8.2	

General election December 1910: Pontefract
Party	Candidate	Votes	%	±%
Liberal	Handel Booth	1,679	50.8	−5.1
Conservative	John Reginald Shaw	1,627	49.2	+5.1
Majority		52	1.6	−10.2
Turnout		3,306	90.3	−3.6
Registered electors		3,661		
Liberal hold		Swing	−5.1	

General Election 1914–15:

Another General Election was required to take place before the end of 1915. The political parties had been making preparations for an election to take place and by July 1914, the following candidates had been selected;

- Liberal: Handel Booth
- Unionist:
- Labour:

Compton-Rickett

General election 1918: Pontefract
Party		Candidate	Votes	%	±%
C	National Liberal	Joseph Compton-Rickett	8,561	62.9	+12.1
	Labour	Isaac Burns	5,047	37.1	New
Majority			3514	25.8	+24.2
Turnout			13,608	45.6	−44.7
	National Liberal gain from Liberal		Swing		
C indicates candidate endorsed by the coalition government.

Walter Forrest

1919 Pontefract by-election
Party		Candidate	Votes	%	±%
C	National Liberal	Walter Forrest	9,920	54.0	−8.9
	Labour	Isaac Burns	8,445	46.0	+8.9
Majority			1,475	8.0	−17.8
Turnout			18,365	61.5	+15.9
	National Liberal hold		Swing	−8.9	
C indicates candidate endorsed by the coalition government.

=== Elections in the 1920s ===
General election 1922: Pontefract
Party	Candidate	Votes	%	±%
Labour	Tom Smith	9,111	38.9	−7.1
Unionist	Joshua Scholefield	8,495	36.1	New
National Liberal	Walter Forrest	5,879	25.0	−29.0
Majority		626	2.8	N/A
Turnout		23,485	73.9	+12.4
Labour gain from National Liberal		Swing		

Mary Grant

General election 1923: Pontefract
Party	Candidate	Votes	%	±%
Labour	Tom Smith	11,134	45.3	+6.4
Unionist	Albert Braithwaite	8,872	36.1	0.0
Liberal	Mary Pollock Grant	4,567	18.6	−6.4
Majority		2,262	9.2	+6.4
Turnout		24,573	73.5	−0.4
Labour hold		Swing	+3.2	

General election 1924: Pontefract
Party	Candidate	Votes	%	±%
Unionist	Christopher Brooke	13,745	51.3	+15.2
Labour	Tom Smith	13,044	48.7	+3.4
Majority		701	2.6	N/A
Turnout		26,789	76.2	+2.7
Unionist gain from Labour		Swing		

General election 1929: Pontefract
Party	Candidate	Votes	%	±%
Labour	Tom Smith	17,335	47.8	−0.9
Unionist	Christopher Brooke	10,040	27.7	−23.6
Liberal	Harold Powis	8,892	24.5	New
Majority		7,185	20.1	N/A
Turnout		27,375	80.1	+3.9
Labour gain from Unionist		Swing	+11.3	

=== Elections in the 1930s ===
General election 1931: Pontefract
Party	Candidate	Votes	%	±%
Conservative	Thomas Sotheron-Estcourt	20,941	55.38	
Labour	Tom Smith	16,870	44.62	
Majority		4,071	10.76	N/A
Turnout		37,811	80.89	
Conservative gain from Labour		Swing		

General election 1935: Pontefract
Party	Candidate	Votes	%	±%
Labour	Adam Hills	19,783	53.41	
National Liberal	Victor Seely	17,257	46.59	
Majority		2,526	6.82	N/A
Turnout		37,040	75.75	
Labour gain from Conservative		Swing		

=== Elections in the 1940s ===
1941 Pontefract by-election
Party	Candidate	Votes	%	±%
Labour	Percy Barstow	Unopposed	N/A	N/A
Labour hold				

General election 1945: Pontefract
Party	Candidate	Votes	%	±%
Labour	Percy Barstow	24,690	60.61	
Conservative	K Hargreaves	16,048	39.39	
Majority		8,642	21.22	
Turnout		40,738	75.09	
Labour hold		Swing		

=== Elections in the 1950s ===
General election 1950: Pontefract
Party	Candidate	Votes	%	±%
Labour	George Sylvester	35,432	75.61	
National Liberal	Maurice Grant	11,431	24.39	
Majority		24,001	51.22	
Turnout		46,863	87.30	
Labour hold		Swing		

General election 1951: Pontefract
Party	Candidate	Votes	%	±%
Labour	George Sylvester	35,280	76.16	
National Liberal	Mervyn Pike	11,043	23.84	
Majority		24,237	52.32	
Turnout		46,323	86.01	
Labour hold		Swing		

General election 1955: Pontefract
Party	Candidate	Votes	%	±%
Labour	George Sylvester	32,646	76.22	
National Liberal	Alan Geoffrey Blake	10,183	23.78	
Majority		22,463	52.44	
Turnout		42,829	79.49	
Labour hold		Swing		

General election 1959: Pontefract
Party	Candidate	Votes	%	±%
Labour	George Sylvester	35,194	76.38	
National Liberal	Edward Bowman	10,884	23.62	
Majority		24,310	52.76	
Turnout		46,078	84.27	
Labour hold		Swing		

=== Elections in the 1960s ===
1962 Pontefract by-election
Party	Candidate	Votes	%	±%
Labour	Joseph Harper	26,461	77.28	+0.90
Conservative	Paul Dean	6,633	19.37	−4.25
Independent	Russell Ernest Eckley	1,146	3.35	New
Majority		19,828	57.91	+5.15
Turnout		34,240	63.26	−21.01
Labour hold		Swing		

General election 1964: Pontefract
Party	Candidate	Votes	%	±%
Labour	Joseph Harper	32,357	76.16	
Conservative	John Flett Whitfield	10,128	23.84	
Majority		22,229	52.32	
Turnout		42,485	77.56	
Labour hold		Swing		

General election 1966: Pontefract
Party	Candidate	Votes	%	±%
Labour	Joseph Harper	32,328	78.36	
Conservative	Anthony F Wigram	8,927	21.64	
Majority		23,401	56.72	
Turnout		41,255	75.63	
Labour hold		Swing		

=== Election in the 1970s ===
General election 1970: Pontefract
Party	Candidate	Votes	%	±%
Labour	Joseph Harper	31,774	74.83	
Conservative	Ian Deslandes	10,687	25.17	
Majority		21,087	49.66	
Turnout		42,461	70.61	
Labour hold		Swing		
