= Whitley Beaumont =

Coordinates: 53.634°N 1.694°W

Whitley Beaumont was an estate near Huddersfield in the West Riding of Yorkshire, Northern England. Whitley Hall (now demolished) was the seat of the Beaumont family. Part of the former estate is now used as a Scout campsite.

== History ==
In around 1200, the lord of Pontefract Castle, Roger de Laci, presented William Bellomonte, ancestor of the Beaumonts of Whitley, with 24 bovates of land, half meadow, half wood and four marks rent on the mill in the same place near Huddersfield. Although there were probably houses built on the site in the interim, the first documented hall was constructed by Sir Richard Beaumont in the early 17th century. The hall was rebuilt in the 18th century in an imposing Georgian style using local millstone grit. The gardens were landscaped by Capability Brown for Richard Henry Beaumont of Whitley Beaumont. These improvements includes thicker tree belts, new plantations and extending the park to the south, and creating a new entrance and drive. Capability Brown's improvements took place around 1779-1780, as a visit to Whitley Beaumont was recorded in his account book in 1779. A payment for a plan, costing his typical fee of £52 and 10 shillings, was sent in May 1780.

By the early part of the 20th century, the house stood empty, and the fittings were sold in 1917. The estate was bought by Charles Sutcliffe, an industrialist, in 1924. He was unable to save the house and estate, and it continued to deteriorate until it was sold in 1950 and split up. The major part to an opencast mining company, and the house was demolished.

== Scouting ==
Charles Sutcliffe allowed Scouts to use the kitchen gardens for camping in 1928 or 1929. After the 1950 break-up of the estate, an area of land south of the hall passed into the hands of the Huddersfield Scout districts. It is now run by volunteers reporting to the Huddersfield South-East district.
