= Sir William Lowther, 2nd Baronet =

English landowner

Sir William Lowther, 2nd Baronet (c. 1694 – 6 March 1763) was an English landowner from Swillington, and a baronet in the Baronetage of Great Britain.

He was the eldest son of Sir William Lowther, 1st Baronet by his wife, Annabella Maynard. He was educated at schools in Wakefield and Leeds before being admitted to Sidney Sussex College, Cambridge, as a fellow-commoner on 28 February 1713.

He succeeded his father as baronet and as Member of Parliament for Pontefract in 1729. He was forced to sell his Pontefract burgages, from which he derived most of his influence in the constituency, in straightened financial circumstances in 1740, and left the Commons when it was dissolved the following year.

He was twice married. His first wife, Diana Condon, whom he married in 1719, was the daughter of Thomas Condon. She died on 1 January 1736, and he married his second wife, Catherine Ramsden (died 5 January 1778), the daughter of Sir William Ramsden, 2nd Baronet, later the same year on 17 August 1736. He had no children by either wife. He left the Swillington estate to his first cousin, Rev. William Lowther, who was later made a baronet and whose son was created Earl of Lonsdale in 1807.

== Arms ==
His coat of arms was: Or six annulets Sable, arranged as three, two and one.

Parliament of Great Britain
Preceded by Sir William Lowther, Bt; John Lowther	Member of Parliament for Pontefract; 1729–1741; With: John Lowther 1729; John Mordaunt 1730–1734; The Viscount Galway 1734–1741	Succeeded by The Viscount Galway; George Morton Pitt
Baronetage of Great Britain
Preceded by William Lowther	Baronet (of Swillington); 1729–1763	Extinct
