= Henry Arthington =

English politician

Henry Arthington (1615 – 19 June 1671) was an English politician who sat in the House of Commons at various times between 1646 and 1660.

Arthington was the eldest son of William Arthington of Arthington and his wife Anne Tancred, daughter of Thomas Tancred of Brampton Hall. He was baptised on 1 January 1616 and came into the family estate on the death of his father in 1623. He was commissioner for assessment for the West Riding of Yorkshire from 1643 to 1649, commissioner for sequestrations for the West Riding in 1643 and commissioner for the northern association in 1645. In 1646, he was elected Member of Parliament for Pontefract in the Long Parliament and continued to sit in the Rump Parliament after Pride's Purge. He was commissioner for militia for Yorkshire in 1648 and commissioner. for assessment for Yorkshire in 1650. In 1650 he became J.P. for the West Riding until 1657. He was commissioner. for assessment for Yorkshire in 1652 and became JP for the liberties of Ripon, Sutton, Marston and Otley in 1654.

In 1656 Arthington was elected MP for West Riding in the Second Protectorate Parliament. In 1659 he was commissioner for militia for Yorkshire 1659. He joined his brother-in-law, Sir Thomas Fairfax in the northern movement for a restoration, and helped Bryan Fairfax when he went to Scotland with the secret message for George Monck. Arthington took part in the capture of York in January 1660. He was commissioner for assessment for West Riding of Yorkshire in January 1660 and commissioner for militia for Yorkshire in March 1660. He was JP for the West Riding from March 1660 until his death.

In April 1660, Arthington was elected MP for Ripon in the Convention Parliament. He became commissioner for oyer and terminer on the Northern circuit in July 1660 and a Deputy Lieutenant for the West Riding in August 1660. He was a lieutenant-colonel in the militia by 1661. From 1663 to 1669, he was commissioner for assessment for West Riding of Yorkshire. 1663-9

Arthington died at the age of 56 and was buried at Adel.

Arthington married Mary Fairfax, daughter of Ferdinando Fairfax, 2nd Baron Fairfax of Cameron on 24 May 1638, and had two sons and four daughters.

Parliament of England
Preceded by Sir George Wentworth of Woolley; Sir George Wentworth of Wentworth Woodhouse	Member of Parliament for Pontefract; 1646–1653; With: William White	Succeeded by Not represented in Barebones Parliament
Preceded by Henry Tempest; John Bright; Edward Gill; Martin Lister	Member of Parliament for West Riding; 1656; With: Henry Tempest; John Lambert; Edward Gill; Francis Thorpe	Succeeded by Constituency discontinued
Preceded by Not represented in Rump Parliament	Member of Parliament for Ripon; 1660–1661; With: Edmund Jennings	Succeeded by Sir John Nicholas; Thomas Burwell
