= Percy Barstow =

British politician (1883–1969)

Member of Parliament for Pontefract
- In office 24 July 1941 – 3 February 1950
- Preceded by: Adam Hills
- Succeeded by: George Sylvester

Personal details
- Born: 23 October 1883 Pontefract, West Yorkshire
- Died: 2 January 1969 (aged 85)
- Party: Labour Party
- Profession: Trade unionist, politician, railwayman

Percy Gott Barstow (23 October 1883 – 2 January 1969) was a Labour Party politician in Great Britain.

== Biography ==
Born in Pontefract, Barstow was educated at Leeds Higher Grade School, then followed his father in becoming an engine driver. Unlike many engine drivers, he chose to join the National Union of Railwaymen (NUR), and from 1906 he worked full-time as a clerk at the union's headquarters. In 1913, he was promoted to become a departmental manager at the union, then in 1934 became its office manager.

Barstow stood unsuccessfully in Barrow-in-Furness at the 1935 United Kingdom general election. He was elected as Member of Parliament (MP) for Pontefract at the 1941 Pontefract by-election following the death of Adam Hills. He was elected unopposed and held the seat until the 1950 General Election.

Percy Barstow entered the House of Commons on 29 July 1941, and made his maiden speech during the War Situations Debate on 25 February 1942.

Parliament of the United Kingdom
Preceded by Adam Hills	Member of Parliament for Pontefract; 1941–1950	Succeeded by George Sylvester
