= John Lowther (died 1729) =

English landowner

John Lowther (c. 1684 – 1 July 1729) was an English landowner from Ackworth Park.

He was the son of Ralph Lowther and Mary Lawson, and the grandson of Sir John Lowther, 1st Baronet. He was member of parliament for the borough of Pontefract from 1722 to 1729, alongside his second cousin Sir William Lowther, 1st Baronet, and died about four months after his cousin.

Parliament of Great Britain
Preceded by Sir William Lowther, Bt; Hugh Bethell	Member of Parliament for Pontefract; 1722–1729; With: Sir William Lowther, Bt 1722–1729; Sir William Lowther, Bt 1729	Succeeded by Sir William Lowther, Bt; John Mordaunt
