= John Jackson (Pontefract MP) =

British MP for Pontefract, died 1637

Sir John Jackson (died 2 July 1637) was an English politician who sat in the House of Commons between 1624 and 1629.

Jackson was the son of Sir John Jackson of Edderthorpe, Yorkshire. He subscribed at Oxford University on 23 October 1612 and was awarded BA from Magdalen Hall, Oxford on 4 July 1615. He was a student of Inner Temple in 1615 and was of Hickleton, Yorkshire. He was knighted on 19 April 1619. In 1624, Jackson was elected Member of Parliament for Pontefract in the Happy Parliament. He was re-elected MP for Pontefract in 1625, 1626 and 1628 and sat until 1629 when King Charles decided to rule without parliament for eleven years.

Jackson died in 1637.

Parliament of England
Preceded by George Skillet; Sir Edwin Sandys, jnr	Member of Parliament for Pontefract; 1624–1629; With: Sir Thomas Wentworth 1624; Richard Beaumont 1625; Sir Francis Foljambe, 1st Baronet 1626; Sir John Ramsden 1628–1629	Parliament suspended until 1640
