= Samuel Waterhouse =

Samuel Waterhouse (1815 – 4 March 1881) was an English Conservative Party politician who sat in the House of Commons from 1863 to 1880.

Waterhouse was the son of John Waterhouse of Wellhead and his wife Grace Elizabeth Rawson, daughter of John Rawson of Stoney Royd, near Halifax. He was a director of the Great Northern Railway. He was also a deputy lieutenant for Yorkshire and a J.P. for the West Riding of Yorkshire and a major in the 2nd West Yorkshire Yeomanry Cavalry.

In January 1860 Waterhouse stood unsuccessfully for parliament at a by-election in Pontefract. He was elected unopposed as a Member of Parliament (MP) for Pontefract at a by-election in August 1863 and held the seat until he stood down from the Commons at the 1880 general election.

Waterhouse died at the age of 65.

Waterhouse married Charlotte Lydia Edwards, daughter of Henry Lees Edwards of Pye Nest in 1840. Her brother Sir Henry Edwards, 1st Baronet was MP for Beverley.

Parliament of the United Kingdom
Preceded by Richard Monckton Milnes; Hugh Childers	Member of Parliament for Pontefract; 1863 – 1880; With: Hugh Childers	Succeeded by Sidney Woolf; Hugh Childers
