= Sidney Woolf =

English pottery manufacturer and politician

Sidney Woolf (16 June 1837 – September 1918) was an English pottery manufacturer and a Liberal Party politician who sat in the House of Commons from 1880 to 1885.

== Life ==
He was the son of Lewis Woolf, a china merchant of London, who had ventured into the pottery business at Ferrybridge, Yorkshire. He was educated at University College, London and at Frankfurt. He was involved in his father's pottery business and in 1857 had a large pottery built called the "Australian Pottery" which he and his brothers ran with the Ferrybridge Potteries at Knottingley. On 29 October 1864, he was one of the leading citizens of the town who formed the Knottingley Town Hall & Mechanics' Institute Company Limited, which developed Knottingley Town Hall, and he became its chairman. He was also chairman of Knottingley school board.

At the 1880 general election Woolf was elected as a member of parliament (MP) for Pontefract. He held the seat until 1885.

== Family ==
Woolf married Isabel Nunes Benvenuta Carvalho, daughter of David Nunes Carvalho of London in 1860. Her brother Solomon Nunes Carvalho was a travel photographer.

Parliament of the United Kingdom
Preceded by Samuel Waterhouse; Hugh Childers	Member of Parliament for Pontefract; 1880 – 1885; With: Hugh Childers	Succeeded by Rowland Winn
