= John Ramsden (died 1646) =

The Honourable Sir John Ramsden MP

Member of Parliament for Pontefract
- In office 1628–1640

Personal details
- Born: John Ramsden; 1594 Longley near Huddersfield
- Died: March 1646 (aged 51–52) Newark
- Spouse(s): Margaret Freshville; Anne Pool
- Children: Two sons William and John
- Parent: William Ramsden

Sir John Ramsden (1594 – March 1646) was an English politician who sat in the House of Commons at various times between 1628 and 1640. He fought for the Royalist army in the English Civil War and was killed in action at the Siege of Newark.

Ramsden was the son of William Ramsden of Longley near Huddersfield. He was knighted in 1619, and in 1623 he inherited the Manor of Huddersfield on his father's death. In 1628 Ramsden was elected Member of Parliament for Pontefract. In 1629 he purchased the Manor of Almondbury. He was appointed High Sheriff of Yorkshire for 1636–37.

In April 1640, Ramsden was elected MP for Pontefract in the Short Parliament. On the outbreak of Civil War, he joined the Royalist cause. In 1644 he was captured at Selby by the Parliamentary Army and committed as a traitor to the Tower of London. In August 1644 he was exchanged for a Parliamentary prisoner held by the King. In 1645, Ramsden was Colonel of the Third Division defending Pontefract Castle and he took part in the negotiations for its surrender. He died during the siege of Newark and was buried at Newark parish church on 27 March.

Ramsden first married, Margaret Freshville, the daughter of Sir Peter Freshville, of Stovely, in Lancashire, and had sons William and John. His second wife was Anne Pool, widow of Alderman Pool, of London.

Parliament of England
| Preceded by Sir John Jackson; Sir Francis Foljambe, 1st Baronet | Member of Parliament for Pontefract; 1628–1629; With: Sir John Jackson | Parliament suspended until 1640 |
| Vacant Parliament suspended since 1629 | Member of Parliament for Pontefract; 1640; With: Sir George Wentworth of Woolley | Succeeded by Sir George Wentworth of Woolley; Sir George Wentworth of Wentworth Woodhouse |
