= Benjamin Oliveira =

British Whig politician (1806-1865)

Benjamin Oliveira FRS, FSA

Member of Parliament for Pontefract
- In office 8 July 1852 – 28 March 1857 Serving with Richard Monckton Milnes
- Preceded by: Richard Monckton Milnes; Beilby Lawley
- Succeeded by: Richard Monckton Milnes; William Wood

Personal details
- Born: 1806
- Died: 28 September 1865 (aged 59) London
- Party: Whig
- Parent: Dominick Oliveira (father)

Benjamin Oliveira FRS FSA (1806 – 28 September 1865) of Hyde Park Street, London was a British Whig politician.

He was the son of Dominick Oliveira, a London merchant of Portuguese descent and spent much of his early life in Portugal. He then moved, by now well-to-do, to live in Hyde Park Street, London, where he took an interest in the development of railways, wrote a book about his travels and joined the Whig political party.

Oliveira was first elected Whig MP for Pontefract in 1852, but was defeated at the next election in 1857.

He was a member of the council of the Society of Arts and was elected a Fellow of the Royal Society in 1835.

He died at his London home in 1865.

Parliament of the United Kingdom
Preceded by Richard Monckton Milnes; Beilby Lawley	Member of Parliament for Pontefract; 1852–1857; With: Richard Monckton Milnes	Succeeded by Richard Monckton Milnes; William Wood
