= George Wentworth (of Wentworth Woodhouse) =

English politician

Sir George Wentworth (baptised 20 July 1609) was an English politician who sat in the House of Commons from 1640 to 1644. He fought for the Royalist army in the English Civil War.

Wentworth was the son of Sir William Wentworth, 1st Baronet of Wentworth Woodhouse and his wife Anne Atkins daughter of Robert Atkins, of Stowell, Gloucestershire.

In November 1640, Wentworth was elected Member of Parliament for Pontefract in the Long Parliament. He was disabled from sitting in parliament in January 1644 for supporting the Royalist cause. He was general of the King's forces in Ireland.

Wentworth married a daughter of Sir Francis Ruish, of Ireland who brought into his possession the manor of Sarre in Kent. Wentworth was the brother of Thomas Wentworth, 1st Earl of Strafford.

Parliament of England
Preceded by Sir John Ramsden; Sir George Wentworth of Woolley	Member of Parliament for Pontefract; 1640 – 1642; With: Sir George Wentworth of Woolley	Succeeded by Henry Arthington; William White
