= Sir William Lowther, 1st Baronet, of Swillington =

British politician (1663–1729)

Sir William Lowther, 1st Baronet, painting by anonymous artist, 1712.

Sir William Lowther, 1st Baronet (8 June 1663 – 6 March 1729) was an English landowner from Swillington, West Yorkshire, and a baronet in the Baronetage of Great Britain.

He was the eldest son of Sir William Lowther by his wife, Catherine Harrison.

He was educated in Yorkshire at Barwick-in-Elmet School, before being admitted to Christ's College, Cambridge, on 17 May 1681. Eighteen months later, on 14 December 1682, he was admitted to Gray's Inn, one of the professional bodies for English lawyers.

In 1691, he married Hon. Amabella Maynard (d. 1734), daughter of Banastre Maynard, 3rd Baron Maynard, and had five children:

- Sir William Lowther, 2nd Baronet (c. 1694 – 1763)
- Henry Lowther, MD, of Newcastle (d. 1743)
- John Lowther, governor of Surat, no issue

and two daughters, Amabella and Jane, who both died unmarried.

He served as High Sheriff of Yorkshire for 1697–8, and was returned to the Parliament of England and the later Parliament of Great Britain for Pontefract over seven parliamentary sessions from 1701 to 1710 and from 1716 until his death. He was created a baronet on 6 January 1715.

He died on 6 March 1729, and was succeeded in the baronetcy by his eldest son, William. Amabella, Lady Lowther, died on 8 August 1734.

== Arms ==
His coat of arms was: Or six annulets Sable, arranged as three, two and one.

Parliament of England
Preceded by Sir John Bland, Bt; John Bright	Member of Parliament for Pontefract; 1701–1707; With: Sir John Bland, Bt	Succeeded by Parliament of Great Britain
Parliament of Great Britain
Preceded by Parliament of England	Member of Parliament for Pontefract; 1707–1710; With: Sir John Bland, Bt	Succeeded by Sir John Bland, Bt; Robert Frank
Preceded by Robert Frank; John Dawnay	Member of Parliament for Pontefract; 1716–1729; With: Hugh Bethell 1716–1722; John Lowther 1722–1729	Succeeded by John Lowther; Sir William Lowther, Bt
Honorary titles
Preceded by Thomas Pulleine	High Sheriff of Yorkshire; 1697	Succeeded by Sir William Strickland, Bt
Baronetage of Great Britain
New title	Baronet (of Swillington); 1715–1729	Succeeded by William Lowther
