= William Wood (Pontefract MP) =

British Whig politician (1816–1872)

Member of Parliament for Pontefract
- In office 28 March 1857 – 29 April 1859 Serving with Richard Monckton Milnes
- Preceded by: Richard Monckton Milnes; Benjamin Oliveira
- Succeeded by: Richard Monckton Milnes; William Overend

Personal details
- Born: 1816
- Died: 19 June 1872 (aged 55)
- Party: Whig

William Wood (1816 – 19 June 1872) was a British Whig politician.

Wood was first elected Whig MP for Pontefract in 1857, but stood down at the next election in 1859.

Parliament of the United Kingdom
Preceded by Richard Monckton Milnes; Benjamin Oliveira	Member of Parliament for Pontefract; 1857–1859; With: Richard Monckton Milnes	Succeeded by Richard Monckton Milnes; William Overend
