= Hugh Bethell (died 1747) =

British Member of Parliament (1689–1747)

Hugh Bethell (4 September 1689 – 1747) of Swindon, Yorkshire was an English politician who sat in the House of Commons from 1716 to 1722.

Bethell was the eldest surviving son of William Bethell of Swindon and his wife Elizabeth Brooke, daughter of Sir John Brooke, 1st Baronet, MP of York. He succeeded his father in 1699. He married Dorothy Draper, the daughter of William Draper of Beswick'.

At the 1715 general election Bethell stood for Parliament as a Whig at Pontefract, probably on the interest of Sir William Lowther, 1st Baronet. He was defeated in the poll but was returned on petition as Member of Parliament with Lowther on 22 March 1716. He voted with the Government on the repeal of the Occasional Conformity and Schism Acts in 1719, but was absent from other divisions. He did not stand at the 1722 general election as he was replaced by John Lowther.

Bethell died without issue on 4 February 1747. He left his estate to his brother Slingsby Bethell, MP.

Parliament of Great Britain
Preceded by John Dawnay; Robert Frank	Member of Parliament for Pontefract; 1716–1722; With: Sir William Lowther, 1st Baronet	Succeeded by Sir William Lowther, 1st Baronet; John Lowther
