= 1941 Pontefract by-election =

UK parliamentary by-election

A 1941 by-election was held on 24 July 1941 for the British House of Commons parliamentary constituency of Pontefract in Yorkshire. The seat had become vacant on the death of the Labour Member of Parliament Adam Hills, who had held the seat since the 1935 general election.

The Labour candidate, Percy Barstow, was returned unopposed.

== See also ==
- Pontefract (UK Parliament constituency)
- 1919 Pontefract by-election
- 1962 Pontefract by-election
- List of United Kingdom by-elections
