= James Cassell =

Australian politician (1814–1853)

James Horatio Nelson Cassell (17 December 1814 – 21 November 1853) was a politician in colonial Victoria (Australia), a member of the Victorian Legislative Council.

Cassell was born in London, England, the son of Lieutenant-Colonel James Cassell (who had served under Horatio Nelson in the marines) and his wife Jane. J. H. N. Cassell arrived in Hobart Town, Van Diemen's Land in 1836.

Cassell was collector of customs in the Port Phillip District (later Victoria) and an appointed member of the Victorian Legislative Council on 29 August 1853 until his death which occurred at his home, Hawksburn House, in South Yarra, Victoria on 21 November 1853. His funeral took place two days later and was described as "one of the most remarkable demonstrations which has taken place in this or in any other country".

He was replaced in the council by Hugh Childers.

Cassell had married Martha Bruford in Hobart, 1840; there were no children.

Victorian Legislative Council
| New seat | Nominated member and Collector of Customs; 29 August 1853 – 21 November 1853 | Succeeded by Hugh Childers |
