= George Wentworth (of Woolley) =

English politician (1599–1660)

Sir George Wentworth (of Woolley) (1599 – 18 October 1660) was an English politician who sat in the House of Commons from 1640 to 1642. He fought for the Royalist army in the English Civil War.

== Early life and career ==
Wentworth was the son of Michael Wentworth of Woolley and his wife Frances Downes, daughter of George Downes of Paunton, Herefordshire. He was knighted at Whitehall on 25 April 1630.

In April 1640, Wentworth was elected Member of Parliament for Pontefract in the Short Parliament. He was re-elected MP for Pontefract for the Long Parliament in November 1640. On the outbreak of the English Civil War, he joined the Royalist cause and was disabled from sitting in parliament in September 1642. He raised a regiment for the King, at his own expense.

== Personal life and death ==
Wentworth died at the age of 60 and was buried at the church of St Peter, Woolley, where there is a memorial in the Wentworth Chapel.

Wentworth married twice. His first marriage was to Anne Fairfax, daughter of Thomas, Lord Fairfax of Denton, by whom he had two sons. His second marriage was to Everild Maltby, the second daughter of Christopher Maltby of Maltby, and by her he had further children. She was a matrilineal descendant of Cecily Neville, Duchess of York, and the mitochondrial DNA descent through which the remains of Richard III of England were identified in 2013 passes through her and their daughter Frances.

Parliament of England
Vacant Parliament suspended since 1629	Member of Parliament for Pontefract; 1640 – 1642; With: Sir John Ramsden 1640; Sir George Wentworth of Wentworth Woodhouse	Succeeded by Henry Arthington; William White
