= John Mordaunt (British Army officer) =

British Army officer and politician (1697–1780)

General Sir John Mordaunt KB
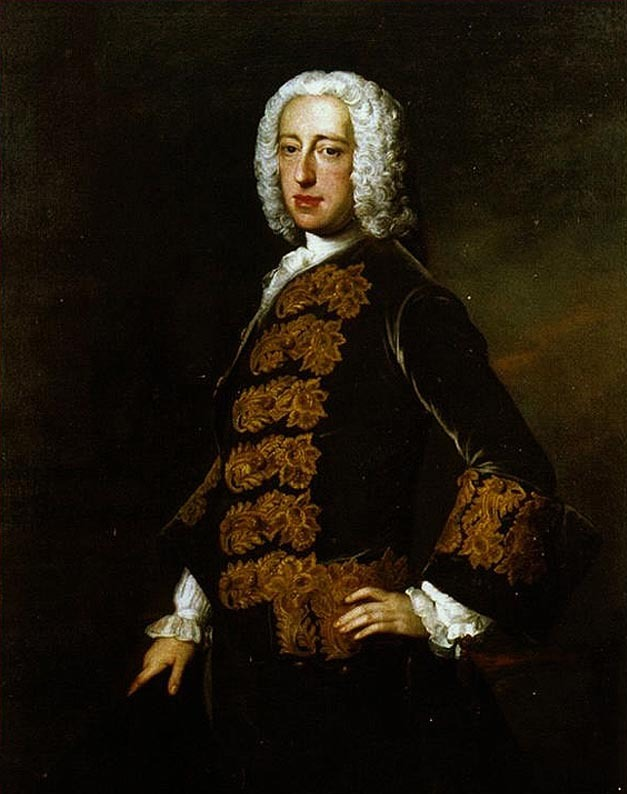
- Portrait by Allan Ramsay, c. 1740
- Born: 1697
- Died: 23 October 1780 (aged 82–83)
- Military career
- Allegiance: Great Britain
- Branch: British Army
- Service years: 1721–1780
- Rank: General
- Conflicts: War of the Austrian Succession; Jacobite Rising of 1745; Seven Years' War
- Awards: Knight Companion of the Order of the Bath

General Sir John Mordaunt KB (1697 – 23 October 1780) was a British Army officer and Whig politician, the son of Lieutenant-General Harry Mordaunt and Margaret Spencer. He was best known for his command of the raid on Rochefort which ended in failure and his subsequent court-martial. Cleared on a technicality, he was nonetheless barred from holding further military command.

== Early career ==
Mordaunt entered the army in 1721 and was promoted captain in George Wade's Regiment of Dragoon Guards in 1726. He became a lieutenant-colonel in the 3rd Foot Guards in 1731.

He entered Parliament for Pontefract in 1730, for which he sat until 1734, and was then member for Whitchurch 1735–1741 and Cockermouth 1741–1768. In Parliament he was a steadfast Whig and supporter of Robert Walpole. In 1739 he became a founding governor of the Foundling Hospital.

On 18 December 1742 Mordaunt was promoted to the rank of full colonel of the Royal Regiment of Ireland, which was sent in 1744 to protect the Netherlands against French invasion. The regiment was recalled in November 1745 to put down the Jacobite rising of 1745, and Mordaunt was promoted brigadier-general. He was present for several engagements of that campaign, rallying and re-forming the beaten troops after the Battle of Falkirk. He commanded one of the two divisions of the army when it left Edinburgh under the command of the Duke of Cumberland. He commanded the third line (reserve) at the Battle of Culloden, and was detached after the battle to pursue the Highlanders. Cumberland presented him with the coach of Bonnie Prince Charlie as a mark of favour.

In 1747, he was promoted major-general and made colonel of a dragoon regiment (later the 12th Dragoons). He led a brigade of infantry at the Battle of Lauffeld, and was made a Knight Companion of the Order of the Bath at the end of the War of the Austrian Succession. He was appointed Governor of Sheerness in 1752. James Wolfe, who was his houseguest while courting his niece in 1754, remarked on his civility and pleasant manner.

== Rochefort ==
On the outbreak of the Seven Years' War in 1756, Mordaunt was placed in charge of training troops at Blandford. The next year, he was appointed to command an amphibious assault on the French port of Rochefort. The immediate objective was to destroy France's Royal Dockyard at the port. A secondary objective was to highlight Britain's capacity to strike at the French mainland, and force France to withdraw troops from other conflicts to defend its western coastline. The plan was championed at the highest levels, including by British Prime Minister William Pitt.

Mordaunt was placed in overall Army command for the assault, supported by Major-General Henry Seymour Conway and Colonel Edward Cornwallis. Royal navy command was vested in Admirals The naval commanders, Sir Edward Hawke and Sir Charles Knowles.

The force of 31 warships and 49 transports carrying 10 battalions of soldiers set sail on 6 September 1757, and captured the Île d'Aix on 21 September. However, they now discovered that shallow water would prevent the ships from approaching closer than a mile and a half from shore, requiring a long and hazardous landing by boats. An attack was planned on the basis of a report by Colonel James Wolfe, who had gone ashore at Rochefort with a scouting party and concluded that the French garrison as too weak to prevent the landing. Wolfe urged Mordaunt into action, offering to capture the town himself if given just 500 men. Despite the report, Mordaunt remained uncertain of victory. On 25 September he called a council of war aboard HMS Neptune, where debate included the prospect of French reinforcements and the possibility that the French might better fortify the town before the British troops could arrive. After two days' discussion, Mordaunt and Conway concluded that assaulting Rochefort was "neither advisable nor practical".

A second council, called on 28 September aboard HMS Ramillies, reversed this decision and decided on a night attack upon the forts at the mouth of the river Charente, with the first embarkation to be led by Mordaunt in person. However, Mordaunt remained equivocal, and the attack did not proceed. Frustrated at the Army's refusal to act, Admiral Hawke declared that as the Army had no willingness to make an assault, the fleet would return to England. The expedition set sail on 29 September and reached Portsmouth on 6 October.

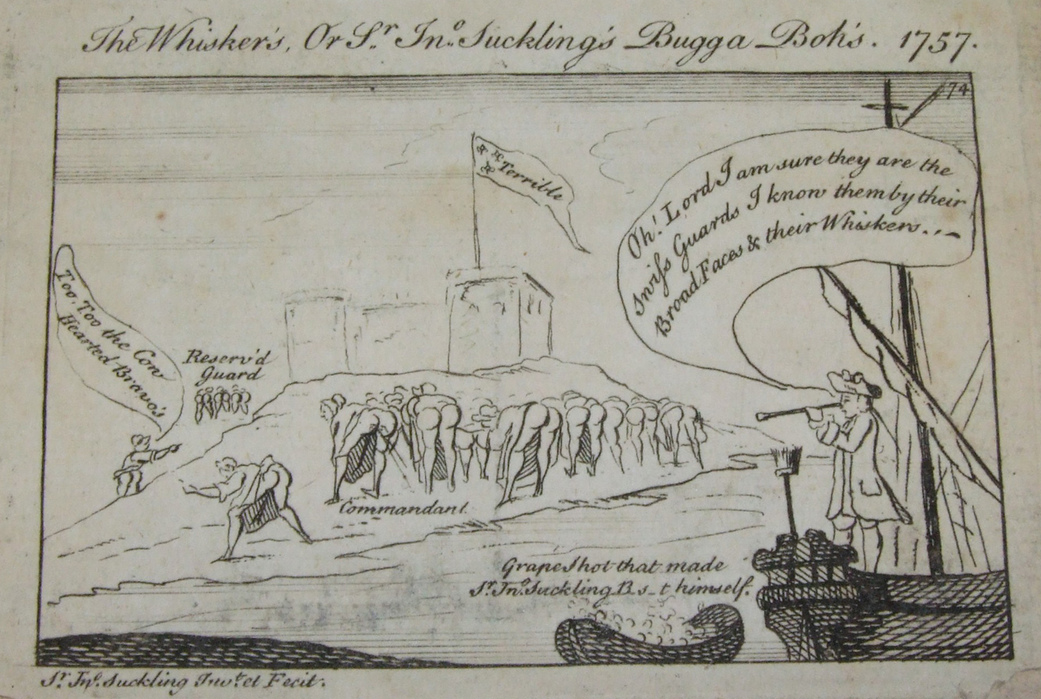
1757 British cartoon mocking Mordaunt's role in the failed raid on Rochefort

Pitt was furious at the failure of the expedition, and at the expenditure of more than £1,000,000 without result. A board of inquiry was convened under the auspices of Charles Spencer, 3rd Duke of Marlborough, George Germain, 1st Viscount Sackville and John Waldegrave, 3rd Earl Waldegrave. In keeping with Wolfe's report to Mordaunt, the board found that "it does not appear to us that there were then, or at any time afterwards either a Body of Troops or Batteries on the Shore sufficient to have prevented the attempting a Descent" and that it did not believe the defences of Rochefort could have been sufficiently improved so as to repel an assault. In the wake of the inquiry, Mordaunt was tried by court-martial in December.

Mordaunt's defence centred on the technicality that his instructions for the expedition did not include an absolute requirement to make a landing. He was acquitted of disobedience, but George II removed Mordaunt, Conway and Cornwallis from the staff in July 1758.

== Later career ==
Mordaunt retained his commission, but having earned the King's displeasure after Rochefort, he never again held a senior field command. He was promoted general in 1770, and was Governor of Berwick-upon-Tweed from 1778 until 1780. He died in his home near Southampton in 1780. He never married and left no children.

== Bibliography ==
- Johnston, Andrew (2007). Endgame 1758: The promise, the glory and Louisbourg's last decade. Cape Breton press. ISBN 9781897009208.
- Robson, Martin (2016). A History of the Royal Navy: The Seven Years' War. London: IB Taurus. ISBN 9781780765457.

Parliament of Great Britain
Preceded by John Lowther; Sir William Lowther, Bt	Member of Parliament for Pontefract; 1730–1734; With: Sir William Lowther, Bt	Succeeded by Sir William Lowther, Bt; The Viscount Galway
Preceded by John Selwyn; John Selwyn	Member of Parliament for Whitchurch; 1735–1741; With: John Selwyn	Succeeded by John Selwyn; John Wallop
Preceded by William Finch; Eldred Curwen	Member of Parliament for Cockermouth; 1741–1768; With: William Finch 1741–1747, 1747–1754; Sir Charles Wyndham, Bt 1747; The Earl of Thomond 1754–1761; Charles Jenkinson 1761–1767; John Elliot 1767–1768	Succeeded by Sir George Macartney; Charles Jenkinson
Military offices
Preceded by Regiment raised	Colonel of John Mordaunt's Regiment of Foot; 1741–1743	Succeeded by Peregrine Lascelles
Preceded by John Armstrong	Colonel of the Royal Regiment of Ireland; 1742–1747	Succeeded by John Folliott
Preceded by Thomas Bligh	Colonel of Sir John Mordaunt's Regiment of Dragoons; 1747–1749	Succeeded by James Cholmondeley
Preceded by Sir John Ligonier	Colonel of Sir John Mordaunt's Regiment of Horse; 1749	Succeeded by Henry de Grangues
Preceded by The Viscount Cobham	Colonel of the 10th Regiment of Dragoons; 1749–1780	Succeeded by William Augustus Pitt
Preceded by The Lord Cadogan	Governor of Sheerness; 1752–1778	Succeeded by Francis Craig
Preceded by Sir John Clavering	Governor of Berwick-upon-Tweed; 1778–1780	Succeeded by Hon. John Vaughan
Court offices
Preceded by Robert Blount	Page of Honour; 1709–1718	Succeeded by Emanuel Howe
