= Rowland Winn, 4th Baron St Oswald =

British soldier and Conservative politician

Rowland Denys Guy Winn, 4th Baron St Oswald, MC, DL (19 September 1916 – 19 December 1984), was a British soldier and Conservative politician.

== Biography ==
St Oswald was the eldest son of Rowland George Winn, 3rd Baron St Oswald, and his wife Eve Carew, daughter of Charles Greene. He was a major in the 8th King's Royal Irish Hussars and served in the Middle East from 1940 to 1944 and South-East Asia from 1944 to 1945 in the Second World War, where he was wounded and mentioned in dispatches. He later fought in the Korean War from 1950 to 1952 where he was awarded the Military Cross (MC).

St Oswald succeeded his father in the barony in 1957 and took his seat on the Conservative benches in the House of Lords. He served under Harold Macmillan and Sir Alec Douglas-Home as a Lord-in-waiting (government whip in the House of Lords) from 1959 to 1962 and as Joint Parliamentary Secretary to the Ministry of Agriculture, Fisheries and Food from 1962 to 1964. From 1973 to 1979 he was an appointed Member of the European Parliament (MEP). He contested the Yorkshire West constituency at the first direct elections to the Parliament, in 1979, but was unsuccessful.

He was also a deputy lieutenant (DL) of the West Riding of Yorkshire and of the City of York.

Lord St Oswald married firstly Laurian, daughter of Sir Roderick Jones, in 1952. They were divorced in 1955. He married secondly Maria Wanda, daughter of Sigismund Jaxa-Chamiec, in 1955. She died in 1981. Lord St Oswald survived her by three years and died in December 1984, aged 68. He was succeeded in the barony by his younger brother, Derek Winn.

Coat of arms of Rowland Winn, 4th Baron St Oswald
Crest A demi-eagle displayed Or ducally gorged Ermine. Escutcheon Ermine on a fess Vert three eagles displayed Or. Supporters Two dragons reguardant Vert each gorged with a ribbon Or pendant therefrom an escutcheon Gules charged with a rose Argent. Motto Tout Pour Dieu Et Ma Patrie (Everything For God and My Fatherland)

== See also ==
- Sophie Moss

== Notes ==
Political offices
Preceded by The Earl Waldegrave; William Fletcher-Vane	Parliamentary Secretary to the Ministry of Agriculture, Fisheries and Food; 1962–1964 with James Scott-Hopkins	Succeeded by John Mackie; James Hoy
Peerage of the United Kingdom
Preceded by Rowland George Winn	Baron St Oswald; 1957–1984	Succeeded by Derek Edward Anthony Winn
