= Thomas Estcourt =

Thomas Estcourt may refer to:

- Sir Thomas Estcourt (died 1624) (c. 1570–1624), English lawyer, member of parliament (MP) for Malmesbury and for Gloucestershire
- Sir Thomas Estcourt (died 1702), English lawyer, MP for Malmesbury, and for Bath
- Thomas Estcourt Cresswell (1712–1788), son-in-law of the above, English merchant, MP for Wootton Bassett
- Thomas Estcourt (1748–1818), English landowner, MP for Cricklade
- Thomas Grimston Estcourt (1775–1853), son of the above, English landowner, MP for Devizes and for Oxford University

== See also ==
- Thomas Sotheron-Estcourt (disambiguation)
