= Thomas E. Sotheron-Estcourt =

English politician (1881–1951)

Captain Thomas Edmund Sotheron-Estcourt JP (27 April 1881 – 25 January 1958) was a British Army officer and a Conservative Member of Parliament from 1931 to 1935.

He married Anne Evelyn Anson on 10 October 1912.

Estcourt was commissioned a second lieutenant in the 7th (Militia) Battalion of the King's Royal Rifle Corps on 11 November 1902. He served with the Royal Scots Greys in the First World War before he was retired from the Army in September 1919 following injuries he received on active service.

At the 1931 general election he was elected as Member of Parliament (MP) for Pontefract. He held the seat until the 1935 general election when it was taken by the Labour Party candidate Adam Hills.

Parliament of the United Kingdom
Preceded by Tom Smith	Member of Parliament for Pontefract; 1931 – 1935	Succeeded by Adam Hills
