= Richard Monckton Milnes, 1st Baron Houghton =

British politician and poet (1809–1885)

The Right Honourable The Lord Houghton FRS
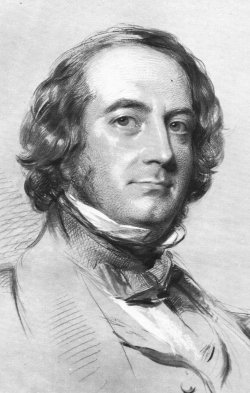
- Lord Houghton, engraved portrait, mid-19th century

Member of Parliament
- In office 1837–1863

Personal details
- Born: 19 June 1809 London, England
- Died: 11 August 1885 (aged 76) Vichy, France
- Party: Tory; Whig
- Spouse: Hon. Annabel Crewe (m. 1851)
- Children: 3, including Florence and Robert
- Parent(s): Robert Pemberton Milnes; Henrietta Maria Monckton-Arundell
- Education: Trinity College, Cambridge
- Occupation: Poet, politician

Richard Monckton Milnes, 1st Baron Houghton, FRS (19 June 1809 – 11 August 1885) was a British poet, patron of literature, and politician. A member of the Whig and later Liberal parties, he served in the House of Commons before being elevated to the peerage as Baron Houghton in 1863. Milnes was known for his literary salons, support of contemporary writers, and contributions to Victorian cultural life.

== Background and education ==
Milnes was born in London, the son of Robert Pemberton Milnes, of Fryston Hall, Castleford, West Yorkshire, and the Honourable Henrietta Maria Monckton-Arundell, daughter of Robert Monckton-Arundell, 4th Viscount Galway. His grandmother was Rachel Slater Milnes (née Busk, 1760–1835), niece of Sir Wadsworth Busk. Milnes was educated privately, and entered Trinity College, Cambridge, in 1827. There he was drawn into a literary set, and became a member of the famous Apostles Club, which then included Alfred Lord Tennyson, Arthur Hallam, Richard Chenevix Trench, Joseph Williams Blakesley, and others. After graduating with an M.A. in 1831, Milnes travelled abroad, spending some time at the University of Bonn.

He went to Italy and Greece, and published in 1834 a volume of Memorials of a Tour in some Parts of Greece, describing his experiences.

== Political career ==
Milnes returned to London in 1837, and was elected to Parliament as a member for Pontefract as a Conservative. In parliament, he interested himself particularly in the question of copyright and the conditions of reformatory schools. He left Prime Minister Sir Robert Peel's party over the Corn Law controversy, and was afterwards identified in politics with Lord Palmerston. His easy good nature had the effect that his political career was viewed with less seriousness by his contemporaries than it might otherwise have been. In 1848, he went to Paris to see something of the revolution, and to fraternise with both sides. On his return he wrote, as a ‘Letter to Lord Lansdowne,' 1848, a pamphlet on the events of that year, in which he offended the conservatives by his sympathy with continental liberalism, and in particular with the struggle of Italy against Austria. During the Chartist riots of 1848, Matthew Arnold wrote to his mother:

Tell Miss Martineau it is said here that Monckton Milnes refused to be sworn in a special constable, that he might be free to assume the post of President of the Republic at a moment's notice.

Milnes shared similar interests and concerns - such as female education and slavery in the United States - with his relative Harriet Martineau whose niece, educationalist Frances Lupton, was the sister-in-law of Anna Jane Lupton (née Busk), a second cousin of Milnes' father. Frances's second cousin was local politician Philip Meadows Martineau (1831-1911) who joined Milnes as a member of the Early English Text Society as did her son, Francis Martineau Lupton, also a local politician and Lord Tennyson.

In 1863, Palmerston elevated Milnes to the peerage as Baron Houghton, of Great Houghton in the West Riding of the County of York.

George W. E. Russell said of him: "As years advanced he became not (as the manner of most men is) less Liberal, but more so; keener in sympathy with all popular causes; livelier in his indignation against monopoly and injustice."

== Literary career and interests ==
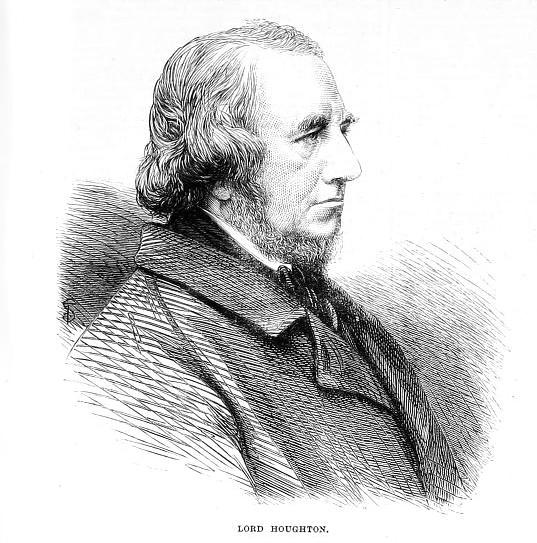

Milnes' literary career was often influenced by church matters. He wrote a tract in 1841, which was praised by John Henry Newman. He took part in the discussion about "Essays and Reviews", defending the tractarian position in One Tract More (1841). He published two volumes of verse in 1838, Memorials of Residence upon the Continent and Poems of Many Years, Poetry for the People in 1840 and Palm Leaves in 1844. He also wrote a Life and Letters of Keats in 1848, the material for which was largely provided by the poet's friend, Charles Armitage Brown. Milnes' ballads were among the most popular of their day.

In 1853 he co-founded the Philobiblon Society with Sylvain van de Weyer. The society was a grouping of eminent members who represented royalty, aristocracy, diplomats, antiquarians, collectors and scholars. The society produced fifteen volumes of Biographical and Historical Miscellanies about every other year. The Miscellany included new contributions, caches of unpublished material and primary works on history, biography and bibliography. Milnes was its editor and one of the main contributors to the Miscellanies until the society's dissolution in 1884.

In 1868, Lord Houghton was elected to the Royal Society. In 1870, he was elected a member of the American Antiquarian Society.

Despite his piety, he had apparently an almost unsurpassed collection of erotic literature, which he bequeathed to the British Library, a collection known to few in his lifetime. A man whom his biographer Saunders said, "had many fine tastes and some coarse ones", Milnes authored The Rodiad, a pornographic poem on the subject of flagellation.

However, his chief distinctions were his sense of literary merit in others and the way he fostered it. He was surrounded by the most brilliant men of his time, many of whom he had been the first to acclaim, such as American Literary pioneer Joaquin Miller. His reputation rests largely on the part he played, as a man of influence in society and in moulding public opinion on literary matters, in connection with his large circle of talented friends. He secured a pension for Tennyson and, as an abolitionist, helped to make Ralph Waldo Emerson known in Britain. He was one of the earliest champions of Algernon Charles Swinburne and helped David Gray by writing a preface for The Luggie. He helped to obtain a job for Coventry Patmore at the British Museum. He was, in the traditional sense, a patron of literature, who never abused the privileges of his position.

=== Women's rights ===
He admired the literacy brilliance in female writers and was a firm friend of the Gaskell family of Manchester. A champion of women's rights, in 1871 he served as a vice-president on the Leeds Committee of the National Association for the Promotion of Social Science and was president of the association in 1873. He supported Meta, the daughter of novelist Elizabeth Gaskell in her work as the Representative of the Manchester Ladies' Educational Association and on The North of England Council for Promoting the Higher Education of Women. The Spectator reported upon Meta's death in 1913 that, "Lord Houghton once said that the conversation and society to be met with in the house of the Gaskells at Manchester – Plymouth Grove – were the one thing which made life in that city tolerable for people of literary tastes".

== Personal life ==
Milnes was a persistent suitor of Florence Nightingale (who finally refused to marry him), and one of her staunchest supporters along with the statesman Sidney Herbert. On 30 July 1851, he married the Honourable Annabella Hungerford Crewe, daughter of the 2nd Baron Crewe. Together they had three children:

- Hon. Amicia Henrietta Milnes (d. 4 Jul 1902). She married Sir Gerald FitzGerald. They had one known son, archaeologist Capt. Gerald Milnes FitzGerald (b. 5 October 1883).
- Hon. Florence Ellen Hungerford Milnes (d. 4 Apr 1923). She married Maj.-Gen. Arthur Henry Henniker-Major, son of John Henniker-Major, 4th Baron Henniker. They had no issue.
- Lord Robert Offley Ashburton Crewe-Milnes, 1st and last Marquess of Crewe (12 Jan 1858 – 20 Jun 1945)

She died in 1874. Lord Houghton died at Vichy, France, in August 1885, aged 76, and was buried at Fryston. He was succeeded in the barony by his son, Robert, who became a prominent Liberal statesman and was created Earl of Crewe in 1895 and Marquess of Crewe in 1911.

Richard and Annabella's two daughters were Amicia Henrietta and the novelist Florence Henniker.

Milnes took an interest in parapsychology and was a member of the Society for Psychical Research.

Parliament of the United Kingdom
| Preceded by John Gully; Viscount Pollington | Member of Parliament for Pontefract; 1837–1863; With: William Thomas Stanley-Massey-Stanley 1837–1841; Viscount Pollington 1841–1847; Samuel Martin 1847–1851; Beilby Lawley 1851–1852; Benjamin Oliveira 1852–1857; William Wood 1857–1859; William Overend 1859–1860; Hugh Childers 1860–1863 | Succeeded by Hugh Childers; Samuel Waterhouse |
Peerage of the United Kingdom
| New creation | Baron Houghton; 1863–1885 | Succeeded by Robert Crewe-Milnes |
