= Hugh Childers =

British and Australian politician (1827–1896)

The Right Honourable Hugh Childers
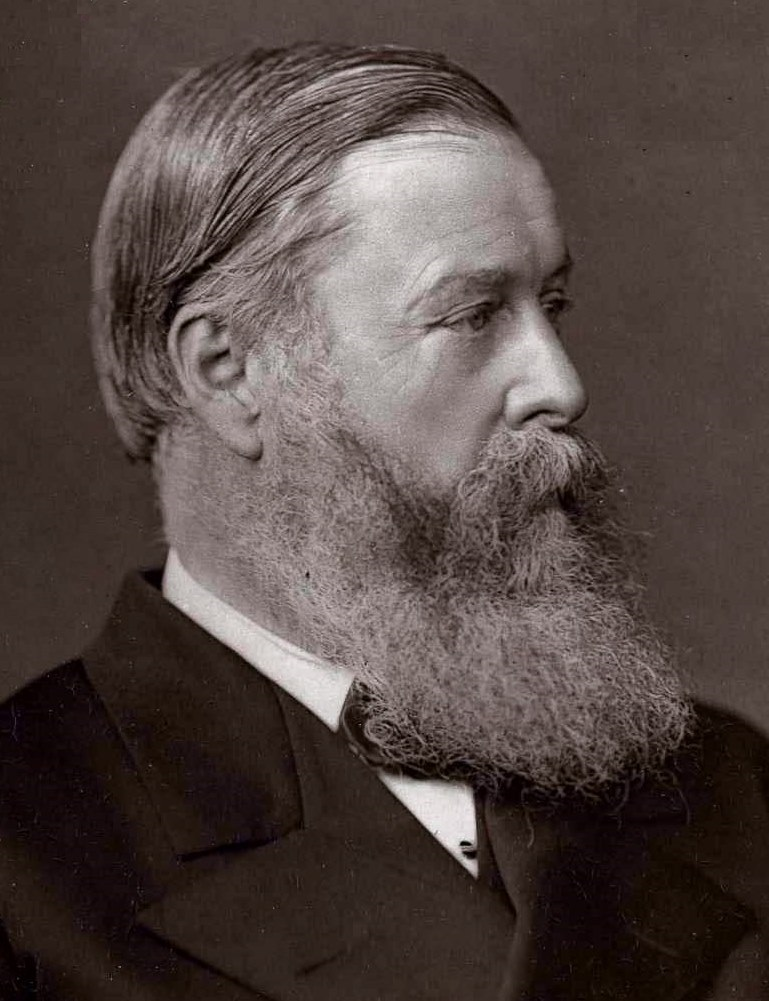
- Childers, c. 1878

Chancellor of the Duchy of Lancaster
- In office 9 August 1872 – 30 September 1873
- Prime Minister: William Gladstone
- Preceded by: The Earl of Dufferin
- Succeeded by: John Bright

Secretary of State for War
- In office 28 April 1880 – 16 December 1882
- Prime Minister: William Gladstone
- Preceded by: Frederick Stanley
- Succeeded by: Marquess of Hartington

Chancellor of the Exchequer
- In office 16 December 1882 – 9 June 1885
- Prime Minister: William Gladstone
- Preceded by: William Gladstone
- Succeeded by: Sir Michael Hicks Beach, Bt

Home Secretary
- In office 6 February 1886 – 25 July 1886
- Prime Minister: William Gladstone
- Preceded by: R. A. Cross
- Succeeded by: Henry Matthews

Personal details
- Born: 25 June 1827 London, UK
- Died: 29 January 1896 (aged 68) London, UK
- Party: Liberal
- Spouse: Emily Walker (d. 1875)
- Children: 8, including Milly
- Relatives: Erskine Childers (cousin)
- Education: Cheam School; Wadham College, Oxford; Trinity College, Cambridge

Hugh Culling Eardley Childers (25 June 1827 – 29 January 1896) was a British Liberal statesman of the nineteenth century. He is perhaps best known for his reform efforts at the Admiralty and the War Office. Later in his career, as Chancellor of the Exchequer, his attempt to correct a budget shortfall led to the fall of the Liberal government led by William Gladstone.

== Early life ==
Childers was born in London, the son of Reverend Eardley Childers and his wife Maria Charlotte (née Smith), sister of Sir Culling Eardley, 3rd Baronet, and granddaughter of Sampson Eardley, 1st Baron Eardley. He was educated at Cheam School under Pestalozzi and then both Wadham College, Oxford, and Trinity College, Cambridge, graduating B.A. from the latter in 1850. Influential on his intellectual development were Adam Smith's theories of free trade, and capital returns.

Childers then decided to seek a career in Australia and on 26 October 1850 arrived in Melbourne, Victoria, along with his wife Emily Walker.

== Australia ==
Childers joined the government of Victoria and served as Inspector of Denominational schools (meaning Protestant and Catholic schools) and immigration agent. In 1852 he became a director of the Melbourne, Mount Alexander and Murray River Railway Company. Childers became auditor-general on 26 October 1852 and was nominated to the Victorian Legislative Council. In 1852 he placed a bill before the colonial legislature proposing the establishment of a university for Victoria, the second in Australia following the foundation of the University of Sydney in 1850. With the receipt of the Royal Assent in 1853, the University of Melbourne was founded, with Childers as its first vice-chancellor. Childers was Collector of Customs from 5 December 1853 to 28 November 1855 and Commissioner of Trade and Customs 28 November 1855 to 25 February 1857. Childers was elected to the inaugural Victorian Legislative Assembly for Portland in November 1856, a seat he held until resigning in February 1857.

== Return to Britain ==
Childers retained the vice-chancellorship until his return to Britain in March 1857 and received an M.A. from Cambridge in the same year.

== Enters British politics ==
In 1860 he entered the House of Commons as a Liberal member for Pontefract, and within a few years joined the government of Lord Palmerston, becoming a Civil Lord of the Admiralty in 1864 and then Financial Secretary to the Treasury in 1865.

== First Lord of the Admiralty ==
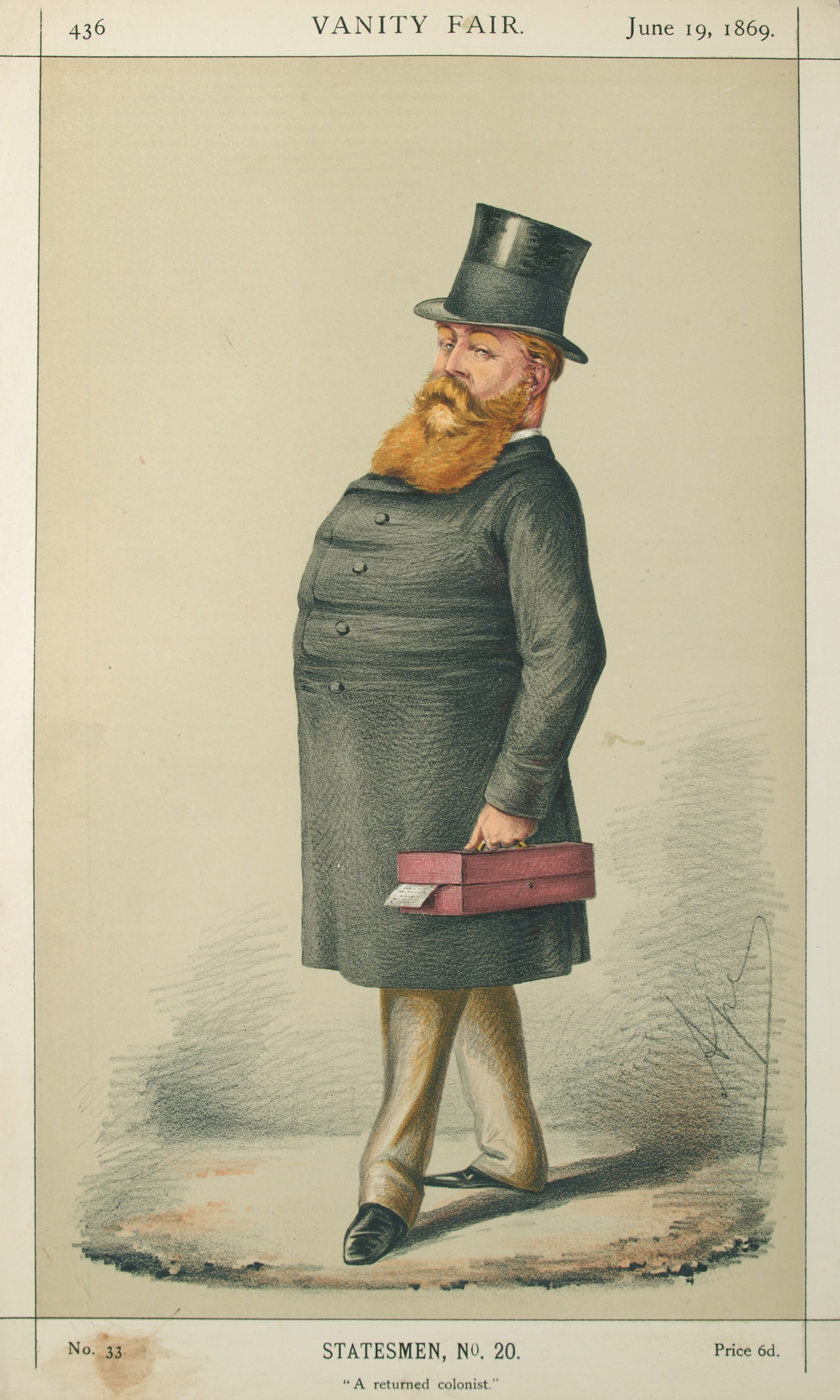
Caricature by Ape published in Vanity Fair in 1869.

With the election of Gladstone's government in December 1868, he rose to greater prominence, serving as First Lord of the Admiralty. Childers "had a reputation for being hardworking, but inept, autocratic and notoriously overbearing in his dealing with colleagues." He "initiated a determined programme of cost and manpower reductions, fully backed by the Prime Minister, Gladstone described him [Childers] as 'a man likely to scan with a rigid eye the civil expenses of the Naval Service'. He got the naval estimates just below the psychologically important figure of £10,000,000. Childers strengthened his own position as First Lord by reducing the role of the Board of Admiralty to a purely formal one, making meetings rare and short and confining the Sea Lords rigidly to the administrative functions... Initially Childers had the support of the influential Controller of the Navy, Vice-Admiral Sir [Robert] Spencer Robinson." "His re-organisation of the Admiralty was unpopular and poorly done."

Childers was responsible for the construction of HMS Captain in defiance of the advice of his professional advisers, the Controller (Robinson) and the Chief Constructor Edward James Reed. Captain was commissioned in April 1870, and sank on the night of 6/7 September 1870. She was, as predicted by Robinson and Reed, insufficiently stable. "Shortly before the battleship sank, Childers had moved his son, midshipman Leonard Childers, from Reed's designed HMS Monarch onto the new ship-of-the-line; Leonard did not survive." Childers "faced strong criticism following the Court Martial on the loss of HMS Captain, and attempted to clear his name with a 359-page memorandum, a move described as "dubious public ethics". Vice Admiral Sir Robert Spencer Robinson wrote 'His endeavors were directed to throw the blame which might be supposed to attach to himself on those who had throughout expressed their disapproval of such methods of construction'." Childers unfairly blamed Robinson for the loss of the Captain, and as a result of this Robinson was replaced as Third Lord and Controller of the navy in February 1871. "Following the loss of his son and the recriminations that followed, Childers resigned through ill health as First Lord in March 1871."

== 1871–1880 ==
Following his resignation he spent some months on the Continent, and recovered sufficiently to take office in 1872 as Chancellor of the Duchy of Lancaster. The consequent ministerial by-election on 15 August 1872 was the first Parliamentary election to be held after the Ballot Act 1872 required the use of a secret ballot.

== Secretary for War ==
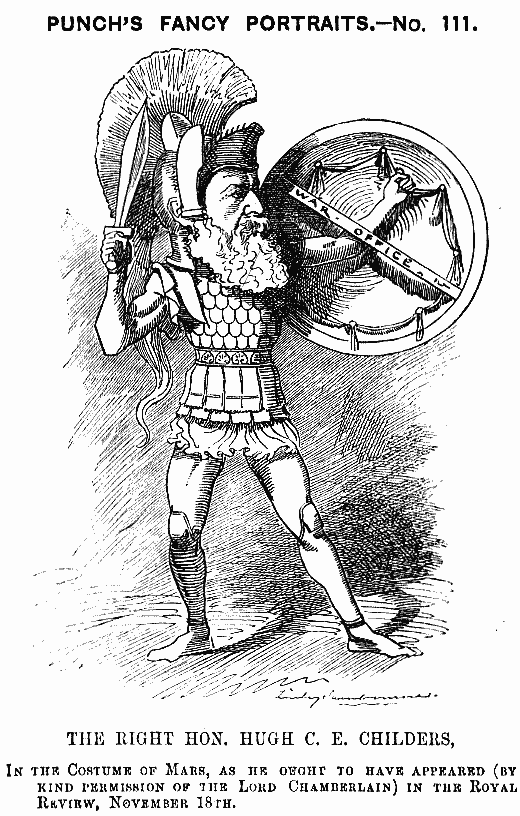
Caricature from Punch, 1882

When the Liberals regained power in 1880, Childers was appointed Secretary for War, a position he accepted reluctantly. He therefore had to bear responsibility for cuts in arms expenditure, a policy that provoked controversy when Britain began fighting; first the Boers in South Africa in 1880 and then the invasion of Egypt in 1882. Childers was also very unpopular with Horse Guards for the reinforcement and expansion of the Cardwell Reforms. On 1 May 1881 he passed General Order 41, which outlined a series of improvements known as the Childers Reforms.

== Chancellor of the Exchequer ==
Childers became Chancellor of the Exchequer in 1882, a post he had coveted. As such, he attempted to implement a conversion of Consols in 1884. Although the scheme proved a failure, it paved the way for the subsequent conversion in 1888. He attempted to resolve a budget shortfall in June 1885 by increasing alcohol duty and income tax. His budget was rejected by Parliament, and the government – already unpopular due to events in Egypt – was forced out of office. Childers's colleague the Earl of Rosebery commented resignedly: "So far as I know the budget is as good a question to go out upon as any other, and Tuesday as good a day."

== Home Secretary ==
At the subsequent election in December 1885 Childers lost his Pontefract seat, but returned as an independent Home Ruler for Edinburgh South (one of the few Liberals who adopted this policy before Gladstone's conversion in 1886). Childers then served as Home Secretary in the short-lived ministry of 1886. He was critical of the financial clauses of the First Home Rule Bill, and their withdrawal was largely due to his threat of resignation. Nevertheless, the bill still failed to pass, and its rejection brought down the Liberal government.

== Retirement and the Childers Commission ==
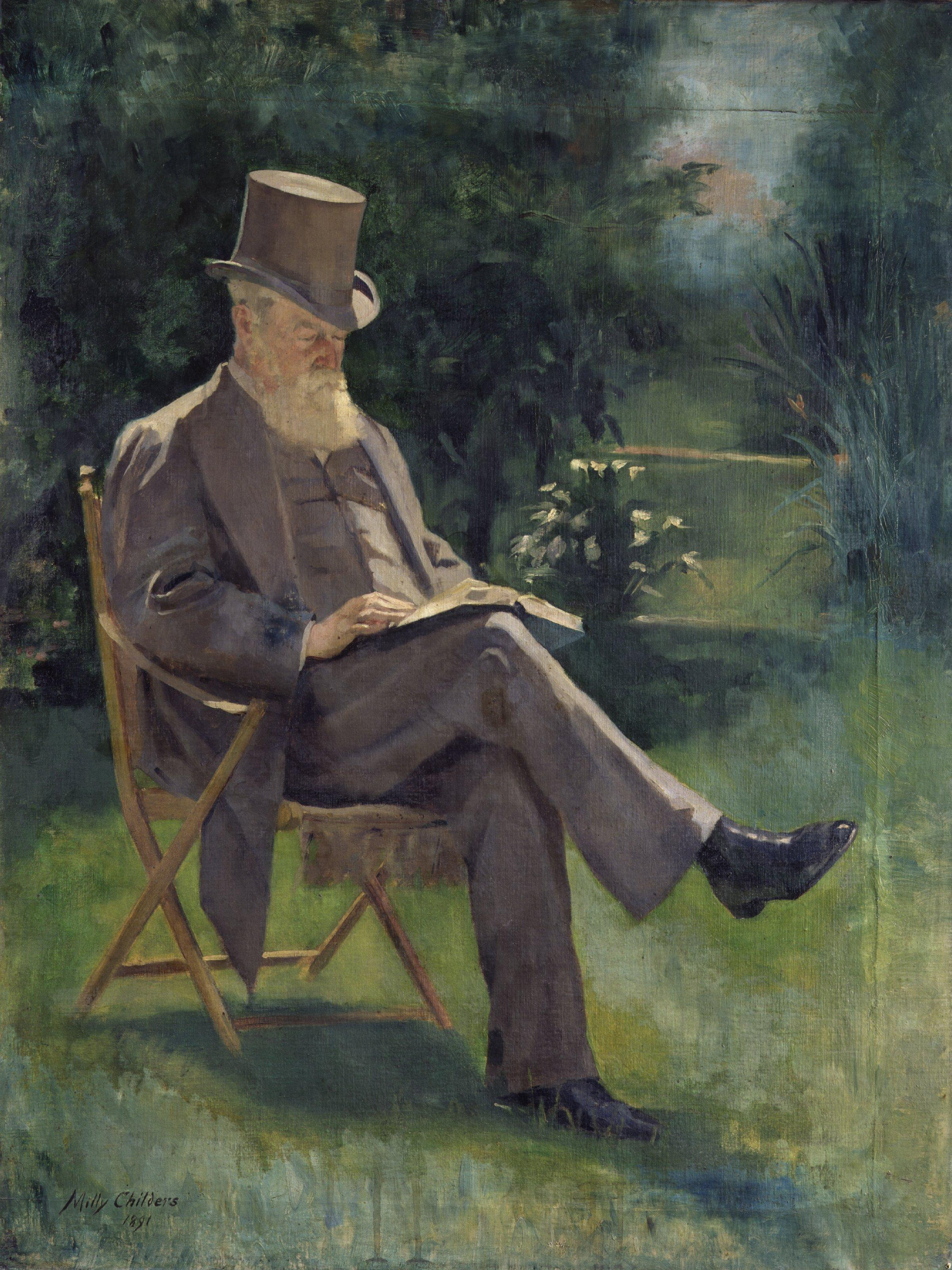
Painting of Hugh Childers by Milly Childers

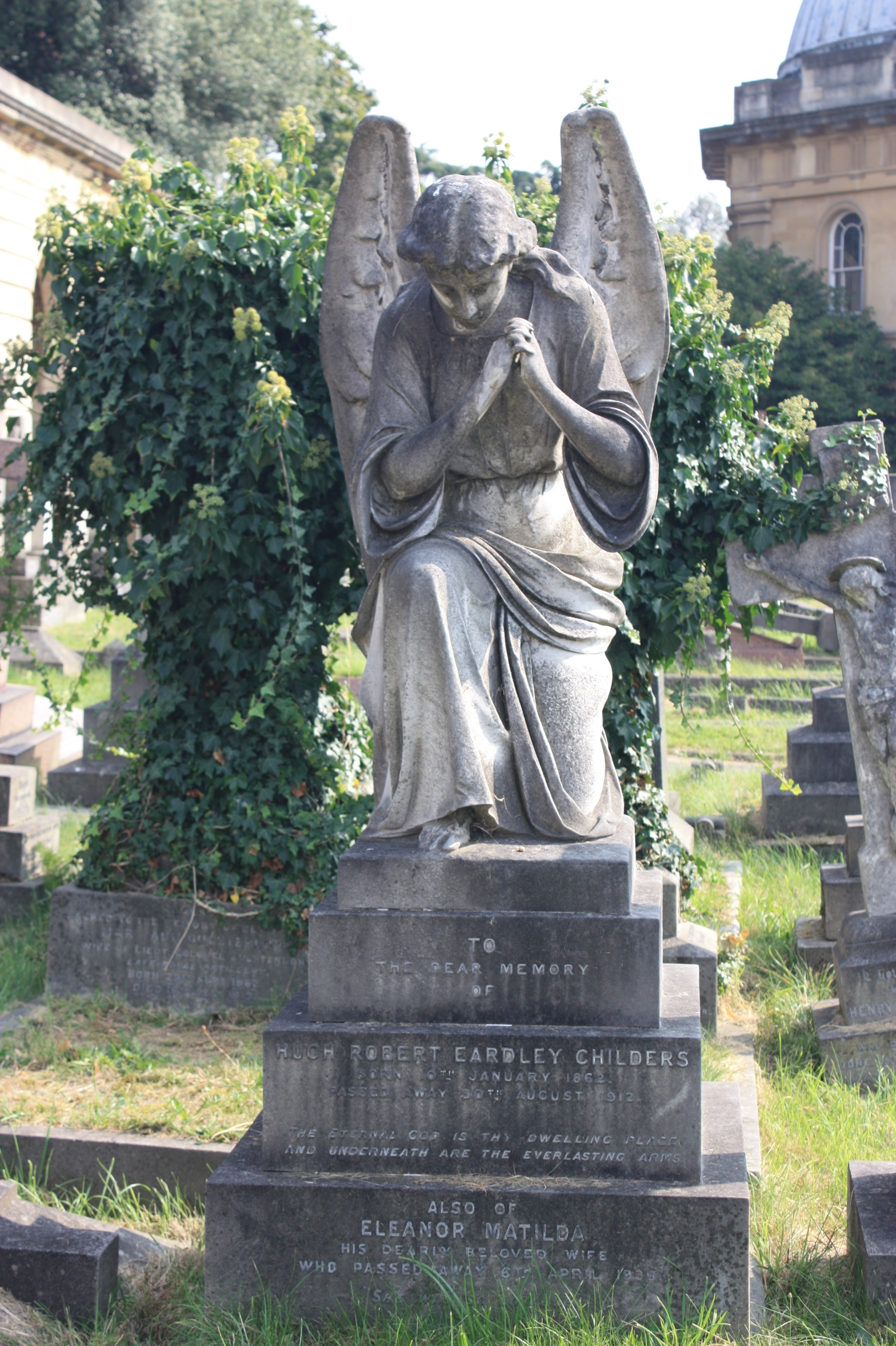
The grave of Hugh Childers, Brompton Cemetery

He retired from parliament in 1892, and his last piece of work was the drafting of a report for the 1894 "Financial Relations Commission" on Irish financial matters, of which he was chairman (generally known as the Childers Commission). This found that, compared to the rest of the United Kingdom, Ireland had been overtaxed on a per capita basis by some £2 or £3 million annually in previous decades. The matter was finally debated in March 1897. In the following decades Irish nationalists frequently quoted the report as proof that some form of fiscal freedom was needed to end imperial over-taxation, which was prolonging Irish poverty. Their opponents noted that the extra tax received had come from an unduly high consumption of tea, stout, whiskey and tobacco, and not from income tax. His younger cousin Erskine Childers wrote a book on the matter in 1911.

Childers' 1894 report was still considered influential in 1925 in considering the mutual financial positions between the new Irish Free State and the United Kingdom. In 1926 an Irish Senate debate included claims by some Senators that, with compound interest, Ireland was owed as much as £1.2 billion by Britain. This, however, ignored the changed economic conditions since 1894, and at the eve of secession Southern Ireland was being heavily subsidised by the British taxpayer. This economic reality forced the initial Irish Free State government to cut the old age pension from five to four shillings. In 1932 on the start of the Anglo-Irish Trade War, the Irish government made a claim for £400 million in respect of past overtaxation, amongst others, but this was not mentioned when the dispute was settled in 1938.

== Family, later life and death ==
Childers married Emily Walker in 1850. They had six sons and two daughters. One of their daughters, Emily "Milly" Childers, was a portrait and landscape painter. His first wife died in 1875 and Childers married Katherine Anne Gilbert in 1879. A cousin, Erskine Childers, was the author of the spy novel The Riddle of the Sands, an important figure in the Irish War of Independence and Irish Civil War (during which he was executed), and father of the fourth President of Ireland, Erskine Hamilton Childers.

Towards the end of his ministerial career "HCE" Childers was known for his girth, and so acquired the nickname "Here Comes Everybody", which was later used as a motif in Finnegans Wake by James Joyce.

Childers died in January 1896, aged 68. He is buried on the south side of the central enclosed roundel in Brompton Cemetery, London.

== See also ==
- Childers, Queensland, town named after Childers
- HMAS Childers (ACPB 93), Australian ship named after the town

== Footnotes ==
Government offices
Preceded by Charles Ebden	Auditor-General of Victoria; 1852–1853	Succeeded by Edward Grimes
Preceded by James Cassell	Collector of Customs, Victoria; 1853–1855	Merged into Commissioner of Trade and Customs
Victorian Legislative Council
Preceded by Charles Ebden	Nominated member 1852–1856	Original Council abolished
Victorian Legislative Assembly
New district	Member for Portland; 1856–1857; With: Daniel Hughes	Succeeded by John Findlay
Parliament of the United Kingdom
Preceded by Richard Monckton Milnes; William Overend	Member for Pontefract; 1860–1885; With: Richard Monckton Milnes 1860–1863; Samuel Waterhouse, 1863–1880; Sidney Woolf 1880–1885	Succeeded by Rowland Winn
Preceded by Sir George Harrison	Member for Edinburgh South; 1886–1892	Succeeded by Herbert Paul
Political offices
Preceded by James Stansfeld	Civil Lord of the Admiralty; 1864–1866	Succeeded by Henry Fenwick
Preceded by Frederick Peel	Financial Secretary to the Treasury; 1865–1866	Succeeded by George Ward Hunt
Preceded by Henry Lowry-Corry	First Lord of the Admiralty; 1868–1871	Succeeded by George Goschen
Preceded by The Earl of Dufferin	Chancellor of the Duchy of Lancaster; 1872–1873	Succeeded by John Bright
Preceded by The Earl of Dufferin	Paymaster General; 1872–1873	Succeeded by William Patrick Adam
Preceded by Hon. Sir Frederick Stanley	Secretary of State for War; 1880–1882	Succeeded by Marquess of Hartington
Preceded by William Gladstone	Chancellor of the Exchequer; 1882–1885	Succeeded by Sir Michael Hicks-Beach
Preceded by Sir R. A. Cross	Home Secretary; 1886	Succeeded by Henry Matthews
Academic offices
New title	Vice-chancellor of the University of Melbourne; 1853–1858	Succeeded by Anthony Brownless
