= Bland (surname) =

Bland is a surname thought to derive from Old English (ge)bland 'storm', 'commotion'.

Notable persons with the surname include:

- Alexander Bland (1866–1947), Welsh international rugby player
- Bill or Billy Bland, see William Bland (disambiguation)
- Bobby Bland (1930–2013), American singer
- Carl Bland (born 1961), American footballer
- Sir Christopher Bland (1938–2017), British politician
- Colin Bland (1938–2018), Rhodesian cricketer
- DaRon Bland (born 1999), American football player
- Dave Bland (1929–2013), Australian rules footballer
- Edward Bland (disambiguation), several people
- Eleanor Taylor Bland (1944–2010), African American writer of crime fiction
- Elizabeth Bland (fl. 1681–1712), Englishwoman celebrated for her knowledge of Hebrew
- Francis Bland (1882–1967), Australian politician
- Giles Bland ((c. 1647–1677), English immigrant to Virginia
- Gordon Bland (born 1941), English cricketer
- Hamilton Bland, BBC swimming commentator
- Harriet Bland (1915–1991), American athlete
- Harry Bland (1898–after 1934), English professional footballer
- Hubert Bland (1855–1914), British socialist and Fabian Society cofounder
- Hugh M. Bland (1898–1967), Justice of the Arkansas Supreme Court
- Humphrey Bland (1686–1763), British Army general
- James A. Bland (1854–1911), African American musician and songwriter
- Joanne Bland (1953–2026), American civil rights activist
- John Bland (disambiguation), several people
- Joseph Edward Bland (1866–1945), American politician
- Joyce Bland (1906–1963), British film actress
- Leonard Thomas Bland (1851–1906), Canadian politician
- Malcolm Bland, New Zealand footballer
- Maria Bland (1769–1838), British singer
- Martin Bland (born 1947), British statistician
- Michael Bland (born 1969), American drummer
- Nate Bland (born 1974), American Major League Baseball pitcher
- Sir Nevile Bland (1886–1972), British diplomat
- Oscar E. Bland (1877–1951), U.S. Representative from Indiana
- S. Otis Bland (1872–1950), U.S. Representative from Virginia
- Peregrine Bland (c.1596–1647), early Virginia settler and politician
- Peter Bland (born 1934), British-New Zealand poet and actor
- Rachael Bland (1978–2018), Welsh journalist and radio presenter
- Richard Bland (disambiguation), several people
- Rivett Henry Bland (1811–1894), early settler and a government administrator in colonial Australia
- Robert G. Bland, American mathematician and operations researcher
- Roger Bland (born 1955), British curator and numismatist
- Salem Bland (1859–1950), Canadian Methodist theologian
- Sammy Bland (1929–2018), American broadcaster and entertainer
- Sandra Bland (1987–2015), American woman found dead in a Texas jail cell
- Theodorick Bland (disambiguation), several people
- Tony Bland (1970–1993), an injured British man who was the subject of a notable court case
- Violet Bland (1863–1940), English suffragette
- William Bland (disambiguation), several people
- Seven Bland baronets, all with the surname Bland

== See also ==
- Judge Bland (disambiguation)
- Justice Bland (disambiguation)
- Senator Bland (disambiguation)
