= John Bland =

John Bland may refer to:

- John Bland (martyr) (died 1555), one of the Canterbury Martyrs
- Sir John Bland, 4th Baronet (1663–1715), of the Bland baronets
- Sir John Bland, 5th Baronet (1691–1743), British politician
- Sir John Bland, 6th Baronet (1722–1755), of the Bland baronets
- John Bland (dramatist) (died c. 1788), Irish barrister and writer
- John Bland (judge) (died c. 1825), judge in Canada
- John Otway Percy Bland (1863–1945), British writer
- John Bland (architect) (1911–2002), Canadian architect
- John Bland (golfer) (1945–2023), South African golfer
- John Bland (rower) (born 1958), British rower
- John Bland (American football) (born c. 1967), American football coach
- John Bland (born 1702) (1702–1750), English writing-master and accountant

== See also ==
- Bland (surname)
- Jack Bland (1899–1968), American musician
