= Bland =

Bland may refer to:

== Places ==
=== Australia ===
- Division of Bland, a former electoral division
- Bland County, New South Wales
- Bland Shire, a local government area in New South Wales
- Bland Creek, New South Wales

=== United States ===
- Bland, Florida, an unincorporated community
- Bland, Missouri, a city
- Bland, Texas, a ghost town
- Bland, Virginia, a census-designated place
- Bland County, Virginia

== People ==
- Bland (surname)
- Bland (given name)

== Other uses ==
- Bland baronets, an extinct title in the Baronetage of England
- USS Bland, a United States Navy attack transport
- USNS Schuyler Otis Bland, a cargo ship

== See also ==
- Bland House, Alexandria, Louisiana, United States, on the National Register of Historic Places
- Joseph Franklin Bland House, Winston-Salem, North Carolina, United States, on the National Register of Historic Places
- Bland Rocks, three islands in Northland, New Zealand
