= Francis Bland (disambiguation) =

Francis Bland (1882–1967) was an Australian politician.

Francis Bland may also refer to:

- Sir Francis Bland, 2nd Baronet (1642–1663), of the Bland baronets
- Sir Francis Christopher Bland (1938–2017), British businessman and politician

== See also ==
- Francis Bland Tucker (1895–1984), American Bible scholar, priest and hymn writer
- Bland (surname)
