= Sir John Bland, 5th Baronet =

British landowner and politician

Sir John Bland, 5th Baronet (1691 – 9 April 1743) of Kippax Park, Yorkshire and Hulme Hall, Lancashire, was a British landowner and politician who sat in the House of Commons from 1713 to 1727.

Bland was the only surviving son of Sir John Bland, 4th Baronet of Kippax Park, Yorkshire and his wife Anne Mosley, daughter of Sir Edward Mosley of Hulme, Lancashire and was baptised on 10 September 1691. He matriculated at Christ Church, Oxford in 1707. He succeeded his father in the baronetcy on 25 October 1715 and married Frances Finch, daughter of Hon. Heneage Finch, 1st Earl of Aylesford (with £8,000), on 16 October 1716.

Bland was at Utrecht in 1712 whilst his father was organising his son's return in the 1713 general election. Bland was duly elected Member of Parliament for Lancashire and also returned unopposed at the next general election in 1715. He was a Tory and his reputation as a Jacobite led to his arrest in November 1715 and also to his removal from the Lancashire bench. At the 1722 general election, Bland again retained his seat unopposed.

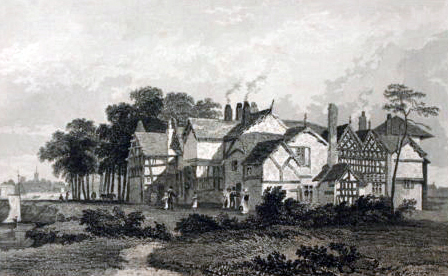
Hulme Hall

He retired from Parliament aged 35 at the 1727 general election and moved the focus of his local political activity from Yorkshire to Lancashire, where his mother had inherited Hulme Hall and the Lancashire estates which covered most of Manchester.

He died at Bath on 9 April 1743. He and his wife had two surviving sons and four daughters. His two sons John and Hungerford succeeded him in turn to the baronetcy.

Sir John, 6th Baronet (1722–1755), was M.P. for Ludgershall, Buckinghamshire from 1754 to 1755, he was a notorious gambler, at one point losing £32,000 in just one evening. In 1751 he would sell Hulme Hall to George Lloyd, F.R.S. In 1755 he fled to France to avoid his creditors, but ultimately committed suicide.

Parliament of Great Britain
Preceded by Hon. Charles Zedenno Stanley; Richard Shuttleworth	Member of Parliament for Lancashire; 1713–1727; With: Richard Shuttleworth	Succeeded by Sir Edward Stanley; Richard Shuttleworth
Baronetage of England
Preceded by John Bland	Baronet (of Kippax Park); 1715–1743	Succeeded by John Bland
