= Hulme Hall, Hulme =

Manor house in Manchester, England

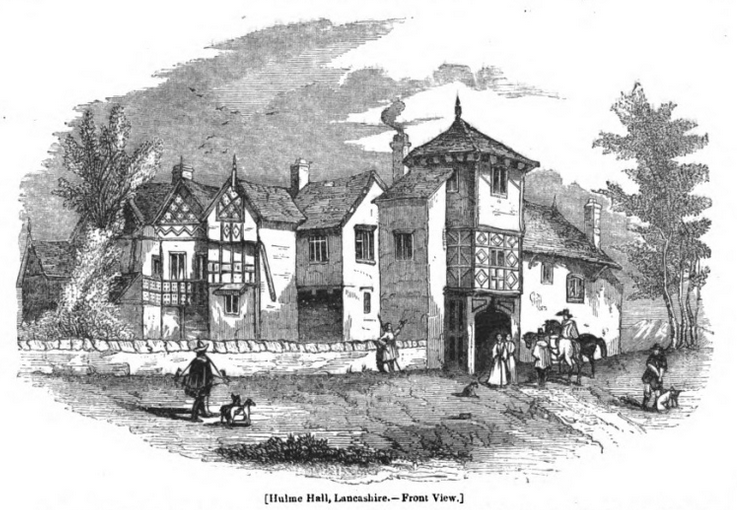
View of frontage of Hulme Hall, Hulme, Manchester, shortly before demolition in 1840. Drawing by Thomas Falcon Marshall.

Hulme Hall was a manor house adjacent to the River Irwell in Hulme, Manchester, England. A structure of this name existed from at least the time of Henry II (1133–1189) until its demolition around 1840 during development related to the Bridgewater Canal. Owners included the Prestwich and the Mosley baronets prior to the property being bought from George Lloyd in 1764 by Francis Egerton, 3rd Duke of Bridgewater.

== Description ==
The hall was a manor house. It was a half-timbered building comprising two stories and built round a quadrangle, situated on a rise of red sandstone that overlooked the River Irwell in the township of Hulme, Manchester. It was well known for its gardens in the 18th century but was demolished around 1840 as part of the development of the Bridgewater Canal. It had been noted to be in poor condition in 1807 and by that time was leased to various poor tenants. Some 16th-century carved oak panels were removed to Worsley Old Hall around 1833.

== Ownership ==
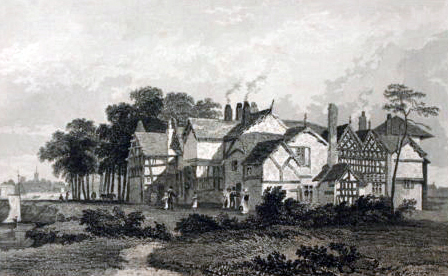
Hulme Hall, Manchester, England, c. 1830.

The building was owned by John de Hulme during the reign of Henry II and by the de Rossindale family by the time of Edward I. During the reign of Henry IV, it was owned by a branch of the family of Prestwich baronets and remained with them for centuries, with a five-year interlude when it was in the possession of Henry de Byrom. Sir Thomas Prestwich sold it to Sir Edward Mosley, 2nd Baronet, in 1660–61. Mosley died without a direct heir at the age of 27 in 1665 and there then followed much litigation regarding his estate, made more complex by various subsequent deaths. In 1695, ownership passed to John Bland, a member of the Bland baronets and Member of Parliament for Lancashire between 1713 and 1727. Bland had married Mosley's sole surviving heir, Anne. (Note: Anne Bland was the founder of St Ann's Church, Manchester.) According to Edward Baines, around this time the hall was "among the most stately residences in the parish of Manchester".

George Lloyd, a Fellow of the Royal Society, bought the hall in 1751. In 1764 the property passed into ownership of the Francis Egerton, 3rd Duke of Bridgewater, who had to pay a large amount of money to acquire it so that he could continue construction of his eponymous canal.

A hidden hoard of treasure was reputed to exist at the hall, although it was never discovered. Supposedly, this was the property of the mother of Thomas Prestwich, whose urgings of her son to advance money to Charles I probably contributed to his financial problems.

== Depictions ==
The hall was central to Sir John Chiverton, a romantic novel co-written by William Harrison Ainsworth, and among those who produced illustrations of it was Charles Allen Duval.
