= John Baynes =

English lawyer and writer

John Baynes (1758–1787) was an English lawyer and miscellaneous writer.

== Life ==
Baynes was born at Middleham, Yorkshire, the son of the solicitor William Baynes (1731–1811), later of Embsay Kirk. He was educated at Bradford School under Benjamin Butler, and then at Richmond Grammar School, under Anthony Temple.

Matriculating in 1773 at Trinity College, Cambridge, Baynes graduated B.A. in 1777, gaining a Smith's Prize (2nd place) and the medal for classics (1st place). In 1779 he was elected a fellow of Trinity, and remained one until his death. In 1780 he took his M.A.

Baynes was admitted to Gray's Inn on 16 April 1777, where he read law with Alan Chambre. He practised as a special pleader. In the undergraduate days of James Scarlett, in the later 1780s, Baynes was no longer a Cambridge resident. At his chambers, Scarlett met Richard Porson.

Shortly before his death, Baynes, with the junior fellows of Trinity, memorialised the senior fellows and master on the irregular election of fellows, but they were only answered by a censure. The memorialists appealed to the lord chancellor as visitor of the college. Baynes and Miles Popple acted for the junior fellows, and Denys Winstanley considered it likely that Baynes drafted the petition to Lord Thurlow. The censure was removed from the college books.

== Politics ==
During the American Revolutionary War, from about 1776, Baynes turned his attention to politics and took an active part in the meeting at York in 1779 of the Yorkshire Association of Christopher Wyvill. He had as a tutor John Jebb, from the period after 1776–7 when Jebb left the University of Cambridge. In volume I of Jebb's Works (1787), edited by John Disney, a tribute to Jebb as teacher from Baynes was printed by Disney, preceded by a report of remarks from John Hinchliffe of Trinity College, a Parthian shot on Jebb's departure, referring to Baynes's "popular party" politics.

From 1780 Baynes was a leading light of the Society for Constitutional Information set up by Jebb ) with Major John Cartwright. He was a member in 1782 of the Westminster Committee of Association, a loose group of opposition Whigs, reformers and Wilkites of the first half of the 1780s. Joseph Priestley was introduced to the Earl of Shelburne by Baynes and Benjamin Vaughan; Baynes is also said to have brought some reformist ideas of Jebb's Peterhouse followers into Shelburne's circle.

With a letter of introduction, Baynes and Samuel Romilly called on Benjamin Franklin at the Hôtel de Valentinois, Passy, in France on 27 August 1783. On 15 September, the Treaty of Paris having been signed, Baynes returned, to discuss politics further with Franklin. He made further visits into October, documented in a journal. On 7 November 1783, Romilly joined the Society for Constitutional Information, nominated by Baynes and seconded by Jebb.

At the 1784 general election, Baynes supported the nomination of William Wilberforce for Yorkshire, and spoke against the Fox–North coalition. He was credited by Wyvill with the anonymous Third Address of the Society for Constitutional Information, of 14 January 1785, which laid emphasis on trial by jury and liberty of the press.

== Works ==
Baynes contributed political articles to the London Courant. He wrote (anonymously) political verses and translations from French and Greek poems; some of these were published in the European Magazine (xii. 240). He is mentioned by Andrew Kippis as supplying materials for the Biographia Britannica.

== Death ==
John Baynes died in London from a fever, on 3 August 1787, and was buried by the side of his friend John Jebb in Bunhill Fields. His epitaph was written by Samuel Parr. He left his friend Joseph Ritson a collection of old romances; and his law library to Samuel Romilly.

== Associations ==
Baynes associated with Francis Blackburne, one of the Feathers Tavern Petitioners from 1771, against subscription to the 39 Articles, who included also Disney, Jebb and Theophilus Lindsey. An obituary wrote of Baynes as "Unitarian-Christian", and Prest has commented that his "heterodox position is incontrovertible". His headmaster at Bradford School, the Rev. Anthony Temple (died 1795), vicar of Easby, was of religious views described as "anti-trinitarian Latitudinarian". Theophilus Lindsey came across Temple at Catterick in 1763, and tracked Temple's theological views, originally Arian, which converged in later publications with his own.

Draper commented that Baynes knew the poet William Mason through the Yorkshire Association; he was involved in the 1782 publication of the Archæological Epistle on the Rowley poems, authored anonymously by Mason, which has been called an attempt to reduce the controversy about them to "an elaborate Shandean joke". It was addressed to Jeremiah Milles. The work was ascribed to Baynes because it went through his hands on the way to the press; but he denied the authorship. Cannon in the Oxford Dictionary of National Biography suggests that Mason used Baynes to have it published. A contemporary view, however, was that John Watson Reed, son of Joseph Reed, a close friend of Baynes, had passed it to the press for him.

Baynes was also an early literary friend of Francis Douce. William John Thoms reported that Douce had mentioned a curse composed by Baynes:

Sir, my friend John Baynes used to say that the man who published a book without an index ought to be damned ten miles beyond Hell, where the Devil could not get for stinging nettles.

Douce's transcription of Baynes's manuscript of The Awntyrs off Arthure, after Baynes's death and before the manuscript went to Joseph Ritson, caused a noted literary row. From Douce's copy, John Pinkerton published the romance, ahead of Ritson, and disregarding an undertaking he'd made to Douce.
