= Thomas Bland (disambiguation) =

Thomas Bland (1830–1908) was an American physician and activist.

Thomas Bland may also refer to:

- Sir Thomas Bland, 1st baronet (1614–1657) of the Bland baronets
- Sir Thomas Bland, 3rd baronet (1662–1668) of the Bland baronets
- Thomas Bland (British physician), father of Rivett Henry Bland
- Thomas Bland (British Army officer) on List of British Army full generals
- Tom Bland (1937–2021), American football wide receiver
