= Gamaliel Lloyd =

English merchant and political reformer

Gamaliel Lloyd (1744–1817) was an English merchant and political reformer, a supporter of the Yorkshire Association.

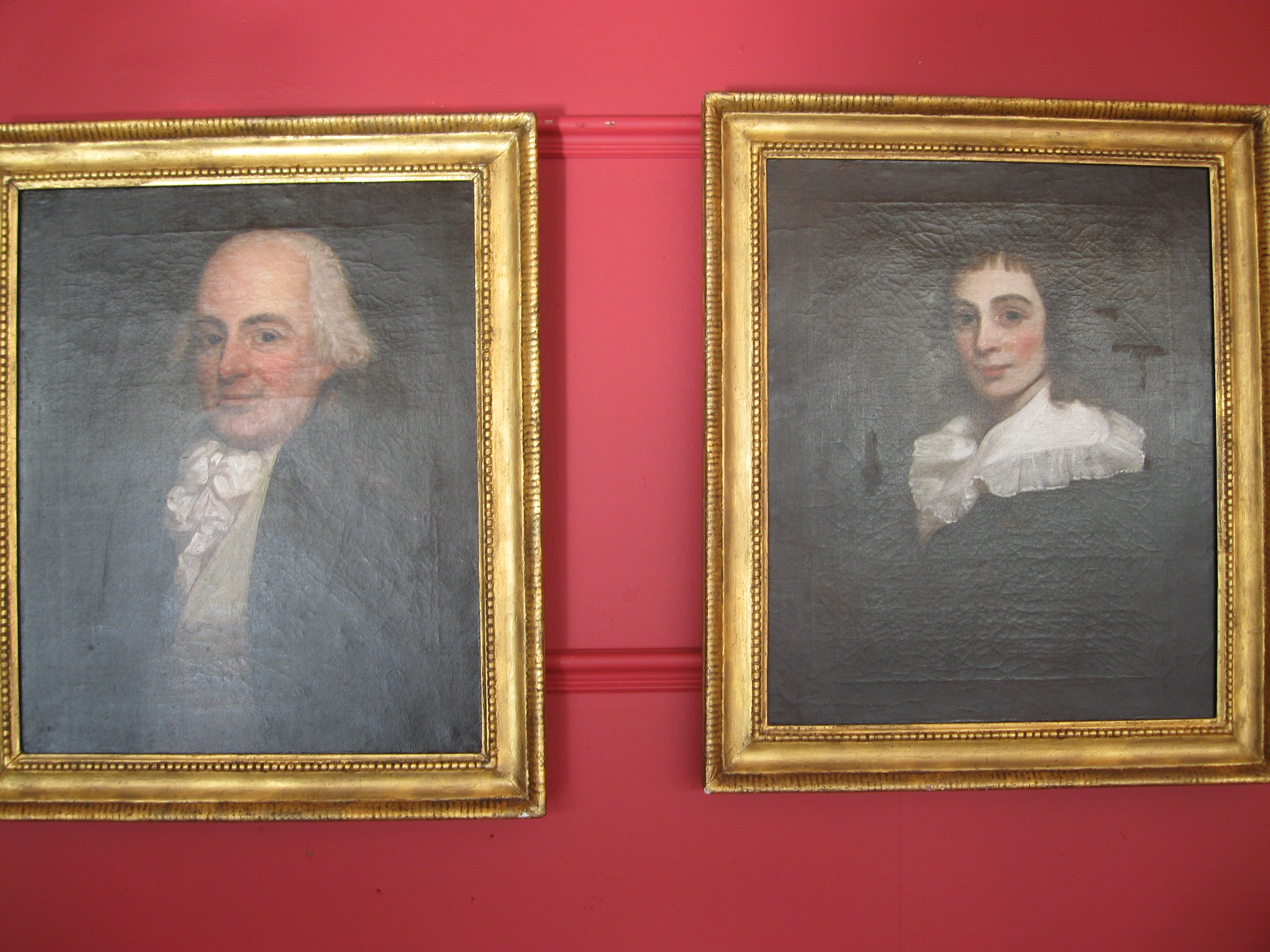
Gamaliel Lloyd and his son William. William married into the Whitelocke family of Strancally Castle, Ireland.

== Life ==
He was the son of George Lloyd of Hulme Hall and his second wife Susanna(h) Horton, sister of Sir William Horton, 1st Baronet. He was apprenticed to the cloth trade in Leeds. He went into business there in the 1760s on his own account, with the Gautier brothers, and then with Horace Cattaneo in the export trade from 1776. Accumulating a business fortune, he bought Stockton Hall.

Lloyd was mayor of Leeds in 1778–9, was a member of the short-lived Literary and Philosophical Society there, and joined the Yorkshire Association in 1780. Christopher Wyvill, the moderate who had founded the Yorkshire Association, was active at that time in campaigning for electoral reform; and Lloyd offered help in corresponding with provincial centres of population. He went door-to-door with a reform petition, accompanied by a fluent speaker of the local Leeds dialect. Both men were involved in Yorkshire abolitionism of the later 1780s. Lloyd also corresponded in 1780 with Sir George Savile, 8th Baronet. He kept up his relationship with Wyvill. In 1793, by which time he was in Suffolk, at Bury St Edmunds, he helped circulate Wyvill's Letter to William Pitt the younger. In 1797 he attended a talk by Henry Crabb Robinson, on the French Revolution; Robinson's Diary identifies Lloyd as a friend of John Cartwright; it also calls him a "Whig of the old school".

In Suffolk Lloyd came to know Capel Lofft, a more radical figure of the Society for Constitutional Information, to which Lloyd also belonged. Lofft drew the normally reticent Lloyd into a judicial scandal of 1798 concerning jury tampering at the trial of Arthur O'Connor, on the basis of a letter to Lloyd from the Rev. Arthur Young. Lloyd had then already become uncomfortable with Lofft's views. He moved away, to Great Ormond Street, London, where he died on 31 August 1817,

== Works ==
Lloyd wrote in Arthur Young's Annals of Agriculture, during the 1790s.

== Family ==
Lloyd married Elizabeth Attwood. They had a son, William Horton, and two daughters, Mary Horton, and Anna Susannah who married Leonard Horner. Stockton Hall passed to the family of Gamaliel's brother George, a barrister. George Lloyd the younger (1787–1863) married into the Greame family.
