= Christopher Wyvill (reformer) =

English cleric, landowner and political reformer

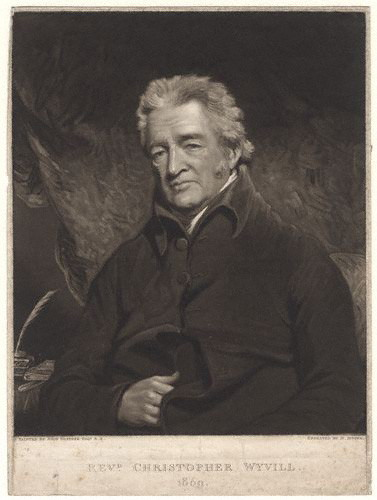
Christopher Wyvill

Christopher Wyvill (1740–1822) was an English cleric and landowner, a political reformer who inspired the formation of the Yorkshire Association movement in 1779.

The American Revolutionary War had forced the government of Lord North to increase taxation. Frustrated with government profligacy, Wyvill and the gentry of Yorkshire called for a package of 'economical reforms': cuts in government spending and patronage, annual parliaments and an increase in the number of county seats in parliament.

Wyvill's cause was taken up by the Rockingham Whig opposition, culminating in the carrying of Dunning's motion in 1780. Some moderate reforms were implemented by the Rockingham-led administration of 1782. William Pitt the Younger raised a number of issues surrounding parliamentary reform in opposition to the Fox-North Coalition in 1783, but his proposal failed to gain the necessary support. In the wake of the French Revolution, Wyvill's platform came to be seen as moderate. Its influence can be detected in the later Great Reform Act and Chartist movement in the nineteenth century.

== Early life ==
He was born in Edinburgh in 1740, the son of Edward Wyvill (died 1791), supervisor of excise there, by Christian Catherine, daughter of William Clifton of Edinburgh. Sir Christopher Wyvill, 3rd Baronet, of Constable Burton, was his great-great-grandfather.

Wyvill matriculated at Queens' College, Cambridge in 1756, obtaining an honorary degree of LL.B. in 1764. In 1774 he came in for the large landed estates of the family in Yorkshire and elsewhere, and the mansion at Constable Burton, the building of which he completed from his cousin, Sir Marmaduke's, designs. He had some years previously taken orders and been presented through his cousin's influence to the rectory of Black Notley in Essex, which he continued to hold and administer by means of a curate, down to 22 September 1806. Debarred from entering the House of Commons, Wyvill began to take a prominent part in county politics.

== The Yorkshire Association ==
In 1779 Wyvill was appointed secretary of the Yorkshire Association, which had for its main objects to shorten the duration of parliaments, and to equalise the representation. He shortly became chairman of the association.

Wyvill drew up a circular letter enunciating its political sentiments, and took a leading part in drawing up the Yorkshire petition presented to parliament on 8 February 1780. A number of moderate Whigs, including Horace Walpole, regarded Wyvill's manifesto as chimerical, Walpole writing that it was full of "obscurity, bombast, and futility". Sir Cecil Wray wrote in a similar vein, and Rockingham wanted to know if the Association had ever considered the practicability of the annual parliaments which they recommended. Wyvill's contention was that the long American war was due primarily, not to the wish of the people, but to the votes of the members of the close boroughs. The Association had the sympathy of politicians including Pitt and Charles James Fox.

A committee under Wyvill was appointed to continue the pressure by correspondence, and the example of Yorkshire was followed by other counties, 25 in all. In the period 1779 to 1781, when there was a delegate conference, the movement gained a broad base. Supporters included John Baynes, Newcome Cappe, John Fountayne, Sir James Grant, Thomas Brand Hollis, Sir James Innes-Ker, John Lee, Gamaliel Lloyd, George Montagu, 4th Duke of Manchester, John Smyth, Charles Stanhope, and William Johnson Temple.

Herbert Butterfield argued that the Yorkshire Association was a quasi-revolutionary organisation and that "our "French Revolution" is in fact that of 1780—the revolution that we escaped". This interpretation was adopted by Robert Roswell Palmer but criticised by other historians such as Richard Pares and I. R. Christie.

With the end of the American Revolutionary War in 1783, however, and the fall of Lord North, the Association disintegrated. Wyvill's supporters dwindled, to a small group including Sir George Savile, and Sir Charles Turner, who spoke of the House of Commons as resembling a parcel of thieves that had stolen an estate and were afraid of letting any person look into their title-deeds for fear of losing it.

Wyvill strongly disapproved of the subsequent war with France, to which he attributed industrial distress in Yorkshire, and this completed his alienation from Pitt. In 1793 Wyvill published in pamphlet form correspondence that had passed between them. Some supplementary letters appeared at Newcastle in a further brochure, and both had a large sale. Wyvill attached himself to the extreme Whig opposition, and he defended in a short pamphlet (early 1799) the secession of 1798. After Fox's death he gave his support to Samuel Whitbread and the peace-at-any-price party.

== Later life ==
Wyvill returned in later life to his early enthusiasm in the cause of universal toleration; in particular he published on Catholic emancipation. He died at his seat, Burton Hall, near Bedale in the North Riding, on 8 March 1822, at the age of 82, and was buried at Spennithorne. A portrait was in the possession of his great-grandson, Marmaduke D'Arcy Wyvill M.P., of Constable Burton.

== Works ==
Wyvill's correspondence with Pitt, and the political correspondence, are known as the "Wyvill Papers". Three volumes appeared in 1794–5 as Political Papers, chiefly respecting the Attempt of the County of York and other considerable Districts, commenced in 1779 … to effect a Reformation of the Parliament of Great Britain. Collected by the Rev. Christopher Wyvill, Chairman of the late Committee of Association (York). The preface is dated Burton Hall, 26 May 1794; in June 1802 Wyvill wrote the preface to a fourth volume, and the papers were eventually concluded in six. They show the proceedings of the Yorkshire Association, and the sympathy of others interested in the reform of Parliament. The correspondence includes letters between the chairman of the association and, among others, the Duke of Grafton, Lord Holland, Lansdowne, Lord Stanhope, Charles James Fox, Major John Cartwright, Capel Lofft, William Mason, William Strickland, Joseph Priestley, Richard Price, Bishop Richard Watson, Tom Paine, Granville Sharp, John Jebb, Sir George Savile, and Benjamin Franklin.

Wyvill's writings were mostly shilling tracts, advocating radical reform. They include:

- Thoughts on our Articles of Religion with respect to their Proposed Utility to the State, London, 1771, several editions.
- Letters to the Committee of Belfast on the proposed Reformation of the Parliament of Ireland, 1782.
- Summary Explanation of the Principles of Mr. Pitt's intended Bill for Amending the Representation of the People in Parliament, 1785.
- A Defence of Dr. Price and the Reformers of England, 1792, (a plea for reform, with some reflections on Edmund Burke).
- A State of the Representation of the People of England on the Principles of Mr. Pitt in 1785, with an Annexed Sketch of Additional Propositions, York, 1793.
- Considerations on the Twofold Mode of Elections adopted in France, 1804.
- A Serious Address to all the Independent Electors of the United Kingdom, 1804.
- A more extended Discussion in Favour of Liberty of Conscience Recommended, 1808.
- Intolerance, the Disgrace of Christians, not the Fault of their Religion, 1808.
- An Apology for the Petitioners for Liberty of Conscience, 1810.
- Papers on Toleration, 1810 (several editions).
- Political and Historical Arguments proving the Necessity of Parliamentary Reform, 2 vols. 1811.

== Family ==
On 1 October 1773 Wyvill married his cousin Elizabeth, an heiress. She died in London on 22 July 1783, aged 68. He married, secondly, on 9 August 1787, Sarah, daughter of J. Codling, and by her had issue, with several daughters, three sons, all educated at Eton College: Marmaduke Wyvill (1791–1872), M.P. for York city from March 1820 to July 1830; Christopher Wyvill, a naval officer; and Edward, rector of Fingal, Yorkshire, who died on 15 September 1869.

== Notes ==
Attribution

- This article incorporates text from a publication now in the public domain: "Wyvill, Christopher (1740–1822)". Dictionary of National Biography. London: Smith, Elder & Co. 1885–1900.
