= Senator Bland =

Senator Bland may refer to:

- James W. D. Bland (1838–1870), Virginia State Senate
- Joseph Edward Bland (1866–1945), Michigan State Senate
- Mary Groves Bland (1936–2016), Missouri State Senate
- Oscar E. Bland (1877–1951), Indiana State Senate
