= Prestwich baronets =

English aristocratic title, 17th century

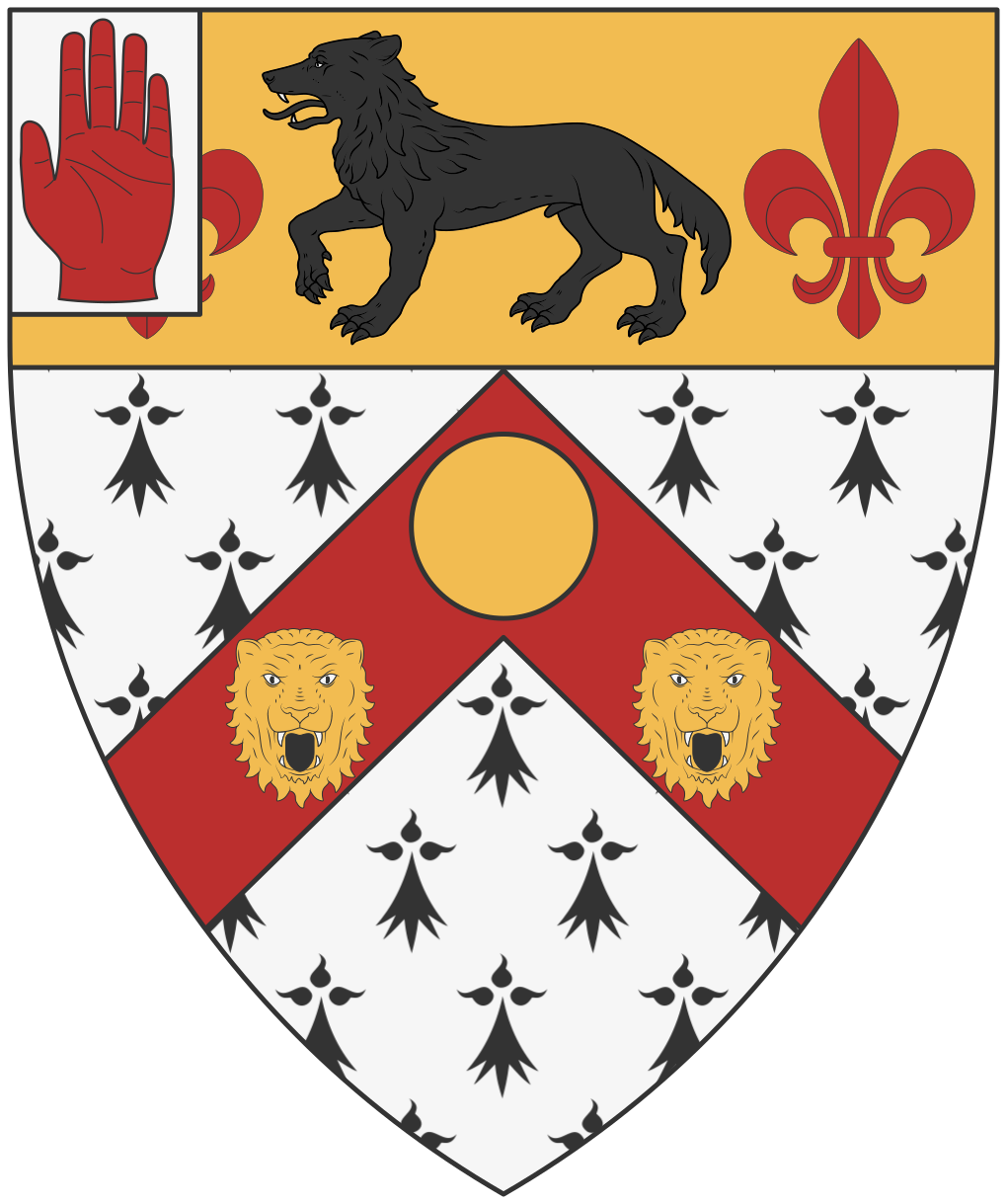
The coat of arms of the Prestwich baronets.

The Prestwich Baronetcy, of Hulme in the County of Lancaster, was a title in the Baronetage of England. It was created on 25 April 1644 for Thomas Prestwich. His support for the Royalist cause in the English Civil War left him impoverished and he was forced to sell the family seat of Hulme Hall in 1660. The title became extinct on the death of the second Baronet in 1676.

== Prestwich baronets, of Hulme (1644) ==
- Sir Thomas Prestwich, 1st Baronet (1604–1674)
- Sir Thomas Prestwich, 2nd Baronet (c. 1625–1676)
