= Edward Bland =

Edward Bland may refer to:

- Edward Bland (composer) (1926–2013), American composer and musical director
- Edward Bland (explorer) (died c. 1653), English explorer and merchant
- Edward David Bland (1848–1927), American politician in Virginia
- Joseph Edward Bland (1866–1945), also known as J. Edward Bland, American politician in Michigan
