= Bland (given name) =

Bland is a generally, but not exclusively, masculine given name which may refer to:

== Men ==
- Bland Abavu (born 1990), Papua New Guinean rugby league footballer
- Bland Ballard (1761–1853), American officer and politician
- Bland Ballard (judge) (1819–1879), American district judge
- Bland Finlay (1952–2021), British biologist
- Bland Massie (1854–1924), American politician
- R. Bland Mitchell (1887–1961), American Episcopal Church bishop of Arkansas in The Episcopal Church and chancellor of Sewanee: The University of the South

== Women ==
- Bland Cox Bruns (1901–1985), American politician
