= John Donald M. MacKay =

American politician (1871–1923)

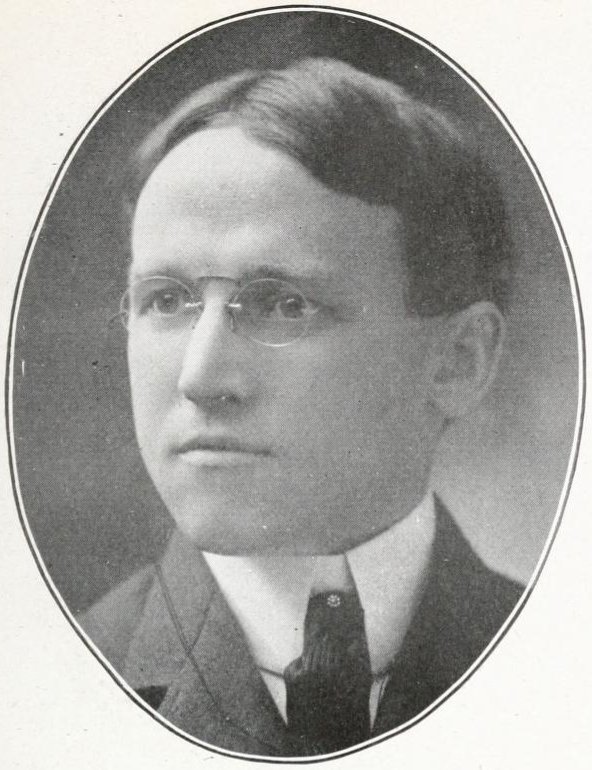

Member of the Michigan Senate from the 3rd district
- In office January 6, 1909 – December 31, 1910
- Preceded by: Joseph Edward Bland
- Succeeded by: Guy Alonzo Miller

Member of the Michigan Senate from the 2nd district
- In office January 4, 1905 – December 31, 1908
- Preceded by: Charles C. Simons
- Succeeded by: Gustav A. Krueger

Personal details
- Born: August 13, 1871 Atlantic, Iowa
- Died: July 23, 1923 (aged 51)
- Party: Republican
- Education: Olivet College; Detroit College of Law

John Donald M. MacKay (August 13, 1871 – July 23, 1923) was a Michigan politician.

== Early life and education ==
John Donald M. MacKay was born on August 13, 1871, in Atlantic, Iowa, to parents Thomas Compton and Johanna MacKay. John was of Highland Scottish descent. With his family, John moved to Spink County, South Dakota, in 1880, where he lived on his father's ranch. He went to district schools in South Dakota, and high school in Atlantic. In 1895, John graduated from Olivet College with a Bachelor of Arts degree. In 1895, John graduated from Detroit College of Law with an LL. B. degree.

== Career ==
In 1895, MacKay was admitted to the bar. He then began practicing law in Detroit as a member of the law firm Stellwagen, MacKay and Wade, which was formerly known as Cutcheon, Stellwagen and MacKay. MacKay specialized in corporation law. At some point, MacKay served on the board of trustees for Olivet College. MacKay was a member of notable clubs, such as the Detroit Club and the Detroit Country Club. He was a member of multiple bar associations: the Detroit Bar Association, the Michigan State Bar Association and the American Bar Association. He also had mining interests in Montana. On November 8, 1904, MacKay was elected to the Michigan Senate where he represented the 2nd district from January 4, 1905, to December 31, 1910. On November 3, 1908, MacKay was elected to the Michigan Senate where he represented the 3rd district from January 6, 1909, to December 31, 1910.

== Personal life ==
On January 17, 1900, MacKay married Isabella Hosie in Wayne County, Michigan. MacKay was Presbyterian.

== Death ==
MacKay died on July 23, 1923.
