= St Ann's Church, Manchester =

Parish church in Manchester, England

Coordinates: 53°28′54″N 2°14′45″W

St Ann's Church
- The Parish Church of St Ann
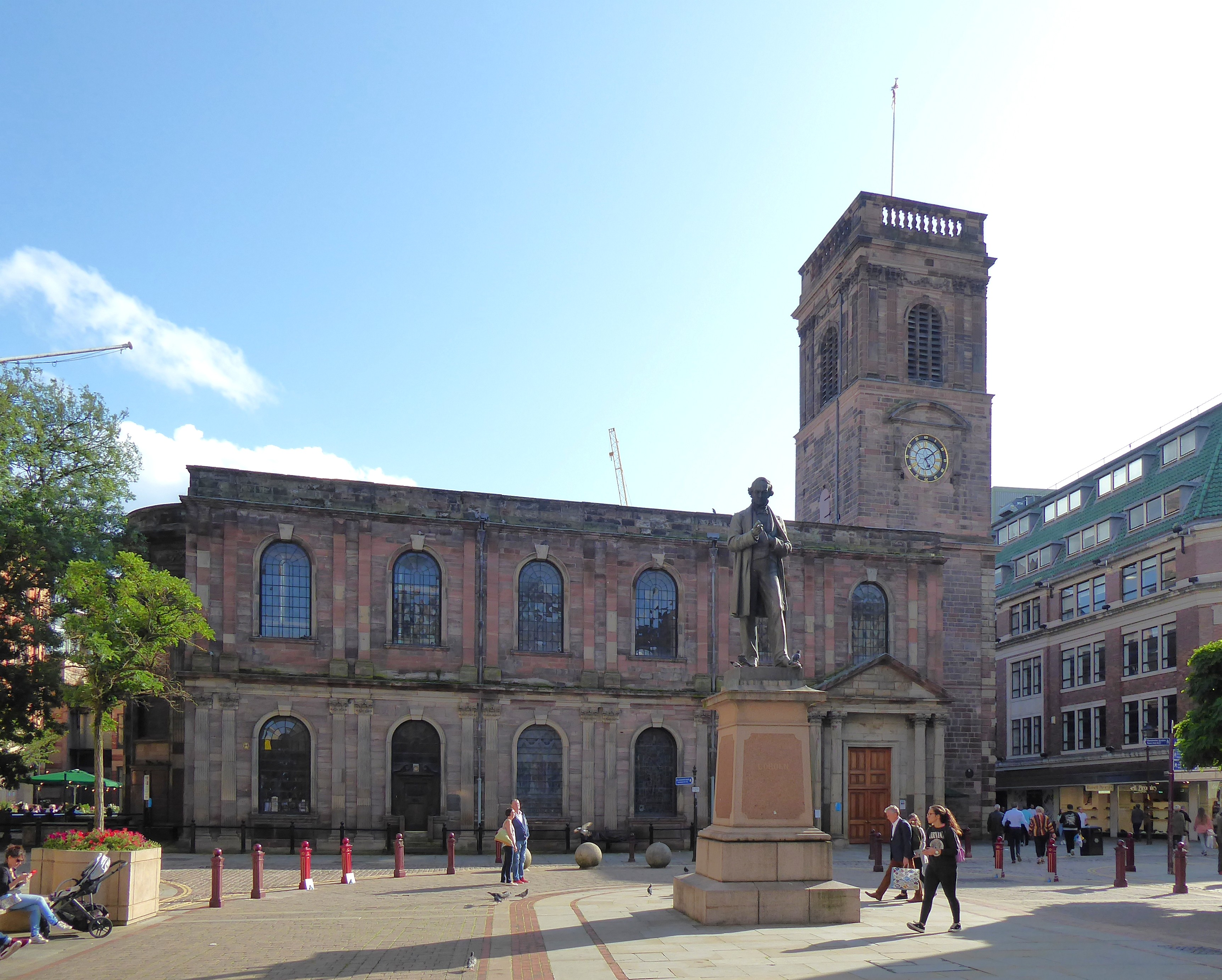
- OS grid reference: SJ 83784 98354
- Location: Manchester
- Country: England
- Denomination: Church of England
- Churchmanship: Broad Church
- Website: Church website

History
- Dedication: St Anne
- Consecrated: 17 July 1712

Architecture
- Functional status: Active
- Style: Classical architecture
- Groundbreaking: 18 May 1709

Administration
- Province: York
- Diocese: Manchester
- Archdeaconry: Manchester
- Parish: St Ann's

Clergy
- Rector: Rev. Adam Robertson

St Ann's Church is a Church of England parish church in Manchester, England. Although named after St Anne, it also pays tribute to the patron of the church, Ann, Lady Bland. St Ann's Church is a Grade I listed building.

== Architecture and setting ==
At the beginning of the 18th century, Manchester was a small rural town, little more than a village, with many fields and timber-framed houses. A large cornfield named Acres Field, which is now St Ann's Square, became the site for St Ann's Church. Acresfield was the site of an annual fair from the 13th century until 1823 when it was moved to Knott Mill.

Although the church stood between the market and the collegiate church, both towers could be seen from all directions. It is a neo-classical building, originally constructed from locally quarried, red Collyhurst sandstone although, due to its soft nature, much of the original stone has since been replaced with sandstone of various colours from Parbold in Lancashire, Hollington in Staffordshire, Darley Dale in Derbyshire and Runcorn in Cheshire. When the church was first constructed, the interior was simple, with plain glass windows. However, in the 19th century many changes were made, including the installation of stained glass windows. Some of these were bespoke, and others were adapted from other churches. One such window, on the north side of the church, was designed and made by William Peckitt of York. (Note: The Peckitt window came from St John's.) The furniture includes a Queen Anne altar table, thought to be the only existing one of its kind, and a painting of "The Descent from the Cross" by Annibale Carracci of Bologna, which had previously hung in the nearby St Peter's Church prior to is demolition in 1907.

The tower of the church marks the centre of the city; surveyors used it as a platform to measure distances to other locations. Their benchmark remains visible at the tower door.

=== Buildings and statues in St Ann's Square ===
At the southeast corner of the square is the Royal Bank of Scotland which is in the Italian palazzo style. It was built in 1848 for Benjamin Heywood's bank by J. E. Gregan. In the square there are two statues; the statue of Richard Cobden is by Marshall Wood, 1867; the Boer War Memorial is by Hamo Thornycroft, 1907.

== History ==
=== Consecration ===
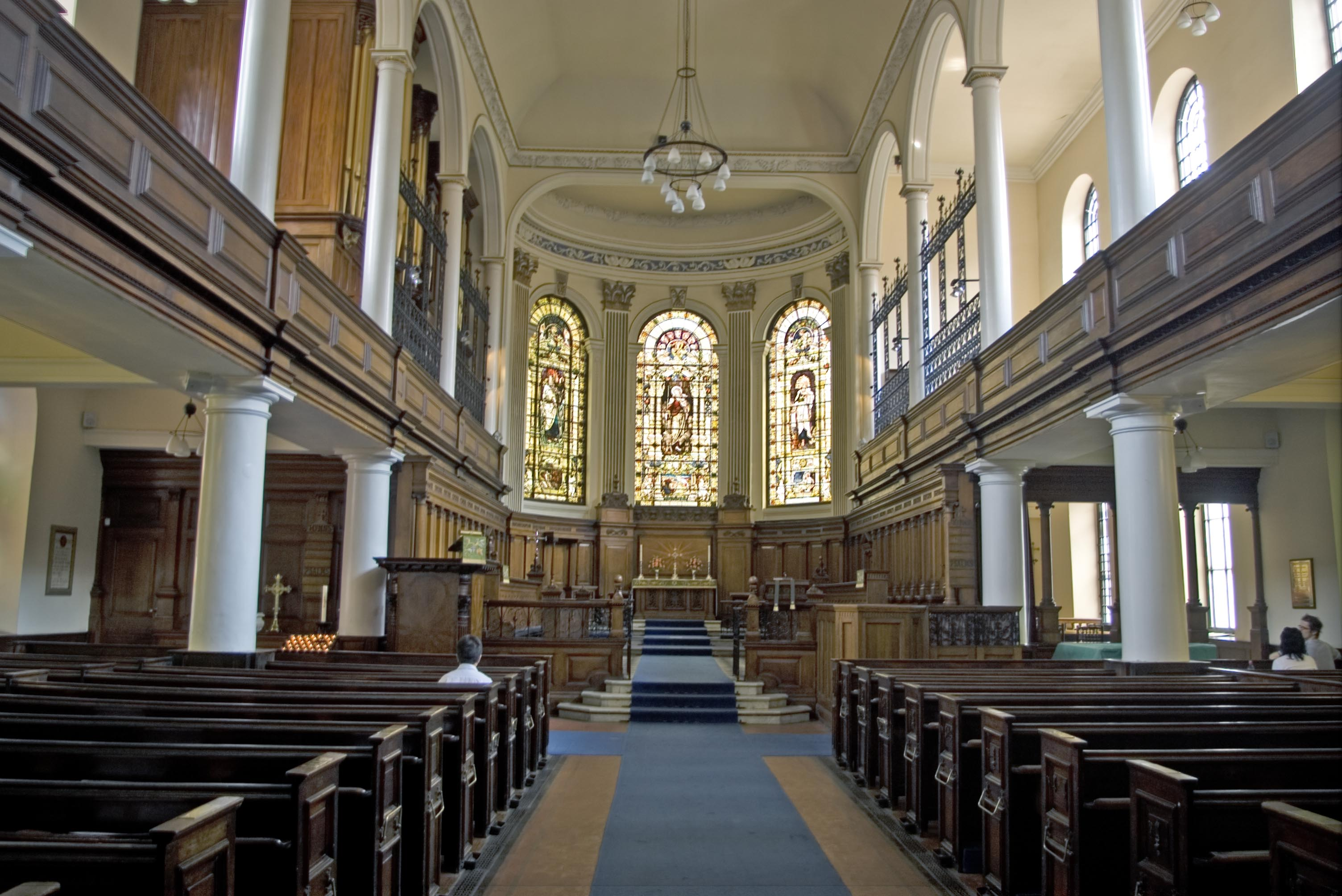
Interior of St Ann's Church

The Mosleys were the Lords of the Manor of Manchester and in 1693 the manor was inherited by Lady Ann Bland, daughter of Sir Edward Mosley, 2nd Baronet and wife of Sir John Bland, 4th Baronet. Lady Bland was a leader of fashion in Manchester, staunch in her religious and political views as a member of the Low Church Party: she herself at first worshipped at the Presbyterian church in the centre of the town. In 1695, however, Henry Newcome, the incumbent, died and Lady Bland decided to found a church of her own. In 1708, Parliament was petitioned to seek permission to build a new church, as the population of Manchester was increasing rapidly. On 18 May 1709, Lady Bland laid the foundation stone of a new church at one end of Acres Field. On 17 July 1712, the church was consecrated by the Bishop of Chester and was dedicated to Saint Anne, the Virgin Mary's mother, which was a compliment both to the founder and to the reigning monarch, Queen Anne. Lady Bland herself is buried in the Church of St James, Didsbury, where a memorial plaque commemorates her life.

=== John Byrom ===
As a result of the proximity of St Ann's to the collegiate church, there was a time when it was fashionable to attend "the old church" in the morning and "the new church" in the afternoon or vice versa. One of those who did so was John Byrom (1692–1763), author of Christians Awake, who played quite a prominent part at St Ann's under the first two rectors, despite his Jacobite sympathies.

=== Manchester becomes a growing town ===
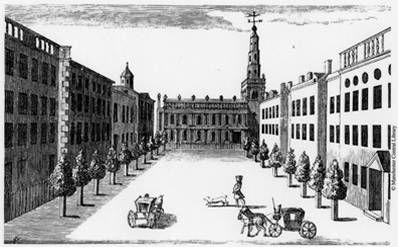
St Ann's Square, 1745

Towards the end of the 17th century, streets had become more numerous in the St Ann's district; by 1720, St Ann's Square had been laid out and planted with trees in imitation of the fashionable squares of London and Bath. By 1735, buildings had begun to rise on the south side of Acres Field and King Street and Ridgefield came into being. There was now no longer the simple distinction between "the old church" and "the new church". The rapid growth of Manchester as a result of the Industrial Revolution led to the building of other churches. Then, as the population moved out to the suburbs in the late 19th and early 20th centuries, many of these churches fell into disuse and were demolished. St Ann's holds the memorials from several of these churches, for example Sir Charles Barry's St Matthew's, Campfield (built 1823–25, demolished 1950).

== Importance to civic life ==
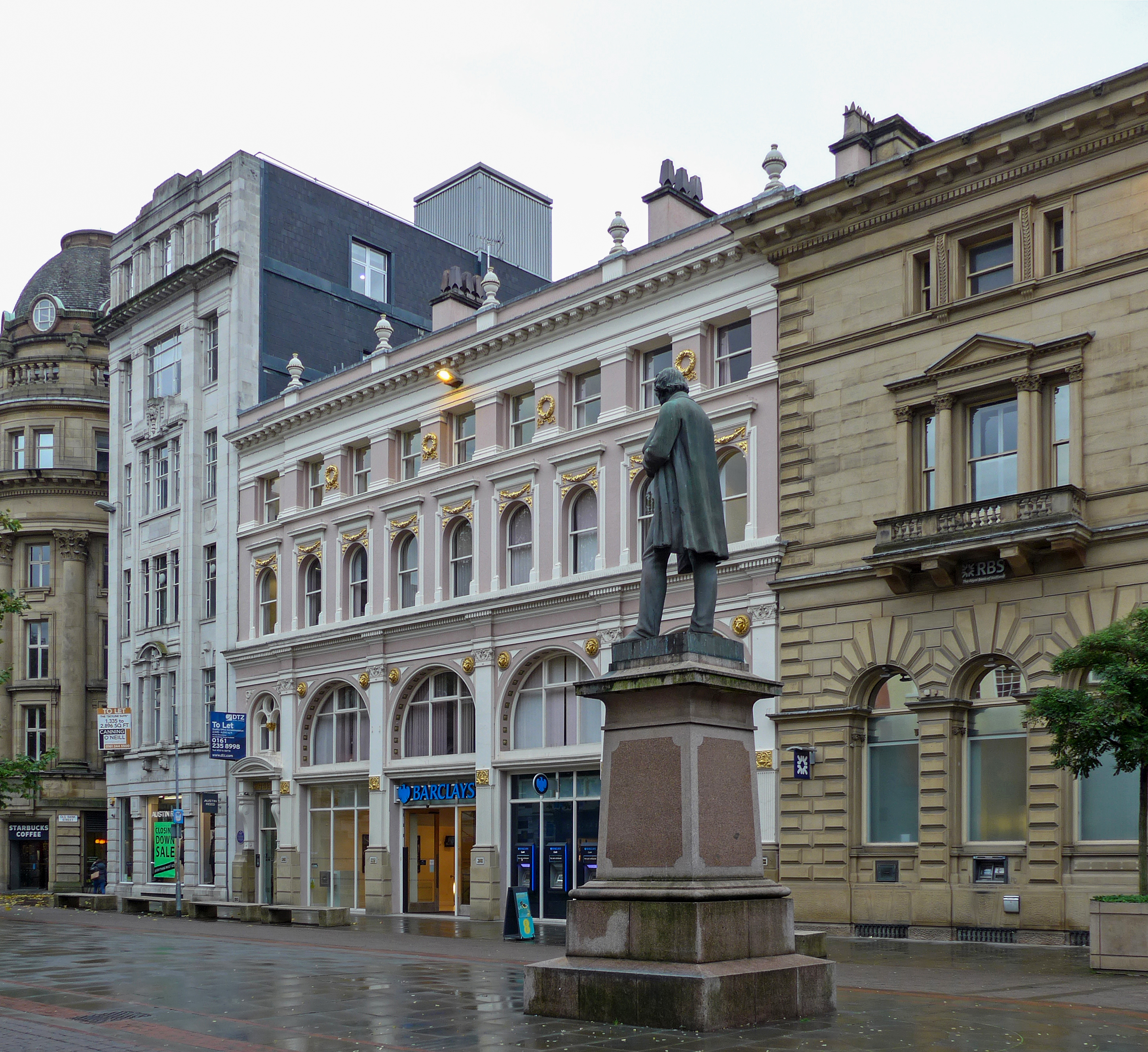
The east side of St Ann's Square, 2015

St Ann's has always been closely associated with the civic life, and its rectors have from time to time acted as chaplain to the Lord Mayor, the county council chairmen and the police. In 1975, the Friends of St Ann's Church was formed from the business houses in the parish, to maintain the fabric of this historic building. Renovation work was carried out at St Ann's during 2011 (whilst the church remained operational). The work included the repair of its clock, bell, stonework and roof. During renovation work the church was draped in large advertising banners, which was controversial for a Grade I listed building. The church has an active concert schedule, including weekly lunchtime organ recitals (on Wednesdays), monthly professional concerts, and regular piano and chamber music concerts by Royal Northern College of Music students. The church has a four-manual George Sixsmith organ.

== See also ==
- Grade I listed churches in Greater Manchester
- Listed buildings in Manchester-M2
- List of ecclesiastical works by Alfred Waterhouse
