= Stockton Hall, York =

Country house and psychiatric hospital near York, England

Stockton Hall
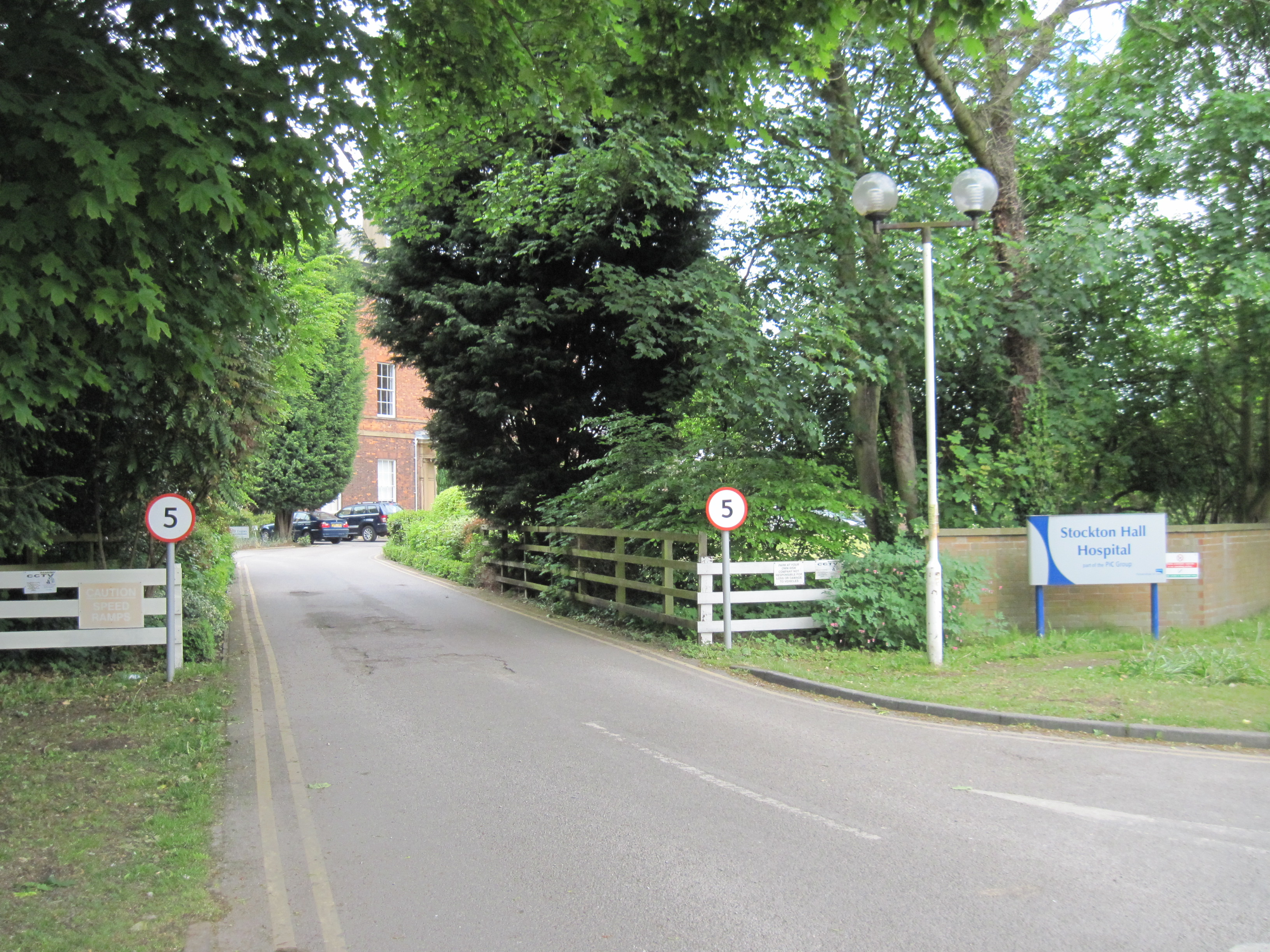
- The entrance to Stockton Hall

- Location within North Yorkshire
- 53°59′42.63″N 01°00′12.06″W
- Type: Country house
- Location: Stockton-on-the-Forest, York, England
- OS grid reference: SE 65436 55919

History
- Built: c. 1800

Site notes
- Architectural style: Flemish bond
- Owner: Priory Group
- Website: www.priorygroup.com/locations/nhs/priory-hospital-stockton-hall

Listed Building – Grade II
- Official name: Stockton Hall, The Village
- Designated: 29 January 1953
- Reference no.: 1173892

Stockton Hall is a late‑18th century country house in the village of Stockton-on-the-Forest near York, United Kingdom. The building is a Grade II listed structure currently in use as a secure psychiatric hospital and owned by the Priory Group

== Description ==
The house is built of red brick laid in Flemish bond fashion with a Welsh slate roof. The three-storey building is built with a symmetrical five-bay frontage and classical elements such as sash windows, a central porch with decorative columns, and a hipped roof with prominent chimneys. The rear elevation includes a bow window and Venetian window arrangement. Inside, the hall is decorated with several classical features, including arches and decorative columns.

== History ==
Stockton Hall was constructed in the late 1800s and was purchased by Gamaliel Lloyd, an English merchant and political reformer. Throughout the late 18th and 19th century it was owned by successive generations of the Lloyd family. The hall was inherited by barrister George William Lloyd of Leeds in 1892.

During the Second World War, Stockton Hall was home to a military encampment.

Stockton Hall was listed as a Grade II building on 29 January 1953, designated for its architectural and historic significance. In 1963 it was approved for use as a school for boys run by the then-York County Borough Council; ten years later in 1973 it became a Community Home with Education (CHE).

Stockton Hall was repurposed as a secure unit for mentally ill patients, known as Stockton Hall Hospital and operated by the General Healthcare Group. It was upgraded in January 2000 with the construction of new wards and a relocation of the Stockton and Hopgrove Cricket Club from the hospital grounds. The hospital was eventually taken over by the Priory Group. According to the Care Quality Commission, the facility "requires improvement" in its overall inspection summary as of August 2023.

In May 2010, Stockton Hall was damaged by a fire that began in a bedroom and spread to the roof that was stated by the fire service to have been started deliberately. A 23-year-old patient was later charged at York Magistrates Court.
