= Joseph Reed (playwright) =

English playwright and poet (1723–1787)

- Born: March 1723; Stockton-on-Tees, County Durham, England
- Died: 15 August 1787 (aged 64); London, England
- Occupations: Dramatist, poet
- Writing career
- Period: 1744–87
- Genres: farce, comic opera

Joseph Reed (March 1723 – 15 August 1787) was an English playwright and poet known for his 1761 farce The Register Office and the 1769 comic opera adaptation of Henry Fielding's Tom Jones.

== Childhood and early career ==
Reed was born at Stockton, Durham, in March 1723, the second son of John Reed, a presbyterian ropemaker. After a very scanty education he succeeded to his father's business, which he practised with success through life. His leisure he devoted to a study of English literature, and he developed literary aspirations; but he always regarded himself as an amateur, and, when he began to publish, often described himself on his title-pages as "a halter-maker."

In August 1744 there appeared in the Gentleman's Magazine a poem by Reed, "in imitation of the Scottish dialect, on the death of Mr. Pope." In 1745 he printed, at Newcastle, a farce called The Superannuated Gallant. In 1747 he visited London with a view apparently to gaining an entrance into theatrical society. Ten years later he removed his business and family to Sun-tavern Fields, Stepney, London.

== Career as playwright ==
On 6 July 1758 Theophilus Cibber produced, at Covent Garden, a burlesque tragedy by Reed, in five acts, called Madrigal and Trulletta. It was humorous but critics regarded it as very long, although Reed blamed Cibber for its want of success. Tobias Smollett denounced it, when published, in The Critical Review, and Reed replied to his critic in a pungent pamphlet called A Sop in the Pan for a Physical Critick, 1759.

=== Success with The Register Office ===
Somewhat more successful was a boisterous and indelicate farce, entitled The Register Office, which was produced at Drury Lane on 23 April 1761. Two of the best characters, Lady Wrinkle and Mrs. Snarewell, were suppressed by the stage censor, but the unexpurgated piece was published, and in an advertisement at the close Reed pointed out that the manuscript had been submitted to Samuel Foote in August 1758, and that Foote had stolen his Mrs. Cole in The Minor from the Mrs. Snarewell of The Register Office. When the farce was revived at Drury Lane on 12 February 1768, Reed supplied a new character, Mrs. Doggerel. The play long held the stage, and was included in John Bell's, Cawthorn's, Mrs. Inchbald's, and other familiar collections.

=== Dido ===
Reed next essayed a tragedy on the subject of Dido, and obtained an introduction to Samuel Johnson, with a view to submitting his labours to him. "I never did the man an injury," Dr. Johnson afterwards lamented, "yet he would read his tragedy to me." Dido was acted at Drury Lane for Holland's benefit on 28 March 1767, with a prologue, written by Garrick and spoken by King, in which humorous reference was made to Reed's trade in halters. In 1787 Reed, in The Retort Courteous, or a Candid Appeal, attacked Thomas Linley, the manager of Drury Lane, for declining to revive Dido. It was performed at Drury Lane, under the title of The Queen of Carthage, for Palmer's benefit on 28 April 1797, when Mrs. Siddons played the heroine. Reed's friend, Joseph Ritson, prepared it for the press in 1792; but, although it was at once printed, it was not announced for publication till 1808. Before the day of publication arrived, however, all the copies were burnt in the fire at Nichols's printing-office, and it was never reprinted.

=== Adaptation of Fielding's Tom Jones ===
Reed was a friend of the author Henry Fielding who had had great success with the novel, The History of Tom Jones, a Foundling. Reed worked on an adaption of the story as a comic opera, a project that Fielding encouraged. The drama opened on 14 January 1769 at Covent Garden, with Shuter as Western and Mattocks as the hero, and was repeated thirteen times. Fielding praised Reed's version publicly.

=== Last performed play ===
Reed's last acted play was The Impostors, or a Cure for Credulity, which he adapted from Gil Blas, and brought out at Covent Garden, for Woodward's benefit, on 17 March 1776.

== Other works ==
Reed's other publications include:

- A British Philippic inscribed to the Earl of Granville, 1756, 4to.
- The Tradesman's Companion, or Tables of Averdupois Weight, 1762, 12mo.
- An Epitaph on the … Earl of Chatham, 1784.
- St. Peter's Lodge, a Serio-comic Legendary Tale in Hudibrastic Verse, 1786, dedicated to the Prince of Wales.
- A Rope's End for Hempen Monopolists, or a Dialogue between a Broker, a Ropemaker, and the Ghost of Jonas Hanway, Esq. In which are represented the pernicious effects of the rise in the price of hemp. By a Halter-maker at the service of all monopolists, 1786; an attack on those who were seeking to corner the market in hemp.

In 1761 Reed contributed to the Monitor, a periodical issued in support of the Earl of Bute's administration; and in 1764 he sent to the Universal Museum an autobiography. In 1772, in the Morning Chronicle, he defended Garrick — despite a pending quarrel between them — from apparent libel by William Kenrick, who had just issued the scandalous Love in the Suds. Reed wrote under the pseudonym of Benedict, and Kenrick reprinted his letters in the fifth edition of his pamphlet.

== Death and family ==
Reed died on 15 August 1787, aged 64, at his residence in Sun-tavern Fields, and was buried at Bunhill Fields. He married, in 1750, Sarah, daughter of John Watson, a flax-dresser of Stockton, and three children survived him. The eldest, John Watson Reed, was an attorney of Ely Place, Holborn, with antiquarian tastes; he died on 31 January 1790.
