= George Lloyd (scholar) =

British scholar

George Lloyd (1708 – 4 December 1783) was an English Fellow of the Royal Society.

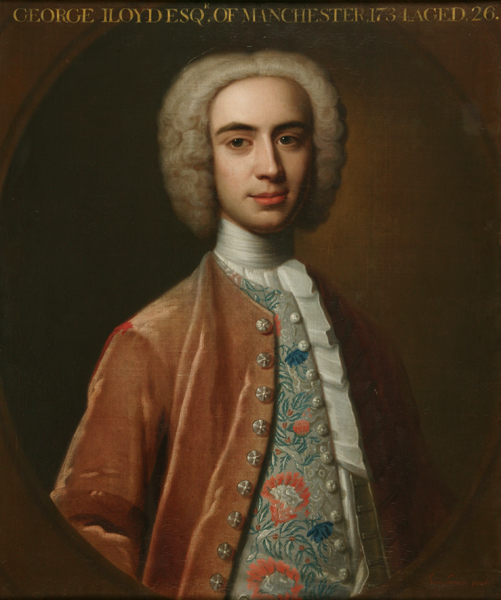
Portrait of George Lloyd FRS aged 26, of Hulme Hall Manchester. Painted by Isaac Seeman

George Lloyd was the son of Gamaliel Lloyd, a merchant and manufacturer in Manchester, and his wife, Sarah. He was born in 1708 and took the degree of M.B. at Queens' College, Cambridge in 1731. He was elected a Fellow of the Royal Society (F.R.S.) in 1737, being sponsored as "a gentleman well-skilled in mathematical knowledge and natural philosophy". He rented Alkrington Hall from the Lever family before buying Hulme Hall as his residence. Lloyd sold Hulme Hall in 1764 to Francis Egerton, 3rd Duke of Bridgewater, who had to pay a large amount of money to acquire it so that he could continue construction of his eponymous canal.

Lloyd later lived in York and, finally, in Barrowby, near Leeds, where he died on 4 December 1783. He was buried nearby at Swillington.

Lloyd married twice, to Eleanor Wright and to Susannah Horton. With Eleanor he had a son, John (1735-8 June 1777) of Welcombe House, who was awarded the degree of B.A. at Corpus Christi College, Oxford in 1756, and was elected F.R.S. as his father had been (1759; being sponsored as "well qualified...by his skill in Natural & philosophical Knowledge as well as in other parts of usefull Learning"). With Susannah, George had sons called Gamaliel, George and Thomas, and daughters called Anne, Susannah and Elizabeth.

Lloyd was appointed a Deputy Lieutenant of the West Riding of Yorkshire in 1779. His son John married Anne Hibbins, daughter of James Hibbins M.D., with whom he had three children, George, John-Gamaliel and Charlotte. Each of George's grandsons, George (1806) and John-Gamaliel (1832), served as High Sheriff of Warwickshire.

== See also ==
- Welcombe House
