= Theodorick Bland =

Theodorick Bland may refer to:

- Theodorick Bland of Westover (1629–1671), Virginia colonial politician, speaker of the House of Burgesses
- Theodorick Bland (surveyor) (1663–1700), Virginia colonial surveyor, son of Theodorick Bland of Westover
- Theodorick Bland of Cawsons (1708–1784), Virginia colonial politician, grandson of Theodorick Bland of Westover
- Theodorick Bland (congressman) (1742–1790), American soldier and politician from Virginia, son of Theodorick Bland of Cawsons
- Theodorick Bland (judge) (1776–1846), American jurist and diplomat from Maryland
