= Bland Finlay =

British biologist

Bland Finlay FRS
- Born: 16 March 1952
- Died: 24 December 2021 (aged 69)

Academic background
- Education: University of Stirling

Academic work
- Discipline: biology
- Institutions: Freshwater Biological Association; Queen Mary, University of London
- Main interests: protists

Bland James Finlay FRS (16 March 1952 – 24 December 2021) was a British biologist.

== Career ==
Finlay received his bachelor's and PhD degrees from the University of Stirling. He worked as a lecturer at University of Jos for a year, before moving to the Freshwater Biological Association's laboratory at Windermere where he was based from 1978 to 2003. Many of his research studies were conducted at the nearby pond of Priest Pot in the Lake District. He then worked at the UK Centre for Ecology & Hydrology from 2003 to 2007. In 2007 he was appointed Professor of Microbial Ecology, Queen Mary, University of London, before retiring in 2012. His research focused on the ecology and physiology of single celled eukaryotic microbes (protists), particularly those from low-oxygen habitats.

== Selected works ==
- Tom Fenchel, Bland J. Finlay, Ecology and evolution in anoxic worlds, Oxford University Press, 1995, ISBN 978-0-19-854838-6
- Bland J. Finlay, Global Dispersal of Free-Living Microbial Eukaryote Species. Science 296, 1061-1063 (2002).
