= Richard Bland (disambiguation) =

Richard Bland (1710–1776) was an American planter and statesman.

Richard Bland may also refer to:

- Richard Bland (burgess) (1665–1720), member of the Virginia House of Burgess
- Richard P. Bland (1835–1899), American Democratic congressman
- Richard Bland (golfer) (born 1973), English professional golfer
- SS Richard Bland, a Liberty ship
