= John Bland (dramatist) =

Irish barrister and writer

John Bland (died c. 1788) was an Irish barrister and writer. He is known for a single dramatic work, the Song of Solomon (1760).

== Life ==
John Bland was the son of Nathaniel Bland, doctor of law, and judge of the prerogative court in Dublin. He most probably enjoyed a classical education, before entering King's Inns, Dublin, in Hilary term, 1741. He was admitted to Lincoln's Inn, London, on 16 January 1742; called to the Irish bar in Hilary term, 1754; and called to the bar at Lincoln's Inn on 12 June 1752. The Biographia Dramatica asserts that he died at his house at Deptford about November 1788.

== Works ==
Bland is the author of a solitary dramatic translation, in blank verse, the Song of Solomon, in seven scenes, printed in 8vo in 1760:

- A Grammatical Version, from the Original Hebrew; of the Song of Solomon, into English blank verse … The whole being a drama, in seven scenes, 1750.

He is therein styled a gentleman, and is described as living in Portpool Lane, Gray's Inn Lane, where he is prepared to give lessons in the art of punctuation by the accent points in the Hebrew code. In his preface he claims to have completed a manuscript, now lost, on that subject.

== Sources ==
- Baker, David Erskine (1782). Biographia Dramatica, or, A Companion to the Playhouse. Vol. 1. New ed. Dublin: T. Henshall. p. 29.
- Kelly, James William (2004). "Bland, John (d. c. 1788), barrister and writer". Oxford Dictionary of National Biography. Oxford University Press. Retrieved 25 July 2022.

Attribution:

- This article incorporates text from a publication now in the public domain: Knight, John Joseph (1886). "Bland, John (d.1788)". In Stephen, Leslie (ed.). Dictionary of National Biography. Vol. 5. London: Smith, Elder & Co. p. 198.
