= William Bland (disambiguation) =

William Bland may refer to:

- William Bland (1789–1868), English physician sent as a convict to Australia
- William Bland (politician) (died 1945), British politician and trade unionist
- William Harry Bland (1898–1962), World War I flying ace
- William T. Bland (1861–1928), U.S. Representative from Missouri
- Billy Bland (singer) (1932–2017), American singer/songwriter
- Billy Bland (runner) (born 1947), British fell runner
- Bill Bland (1916–2001), British Hoxhaist
- Spike Bland (William Bland, fl. 1941), American baseball player
