= Sammy Bland =

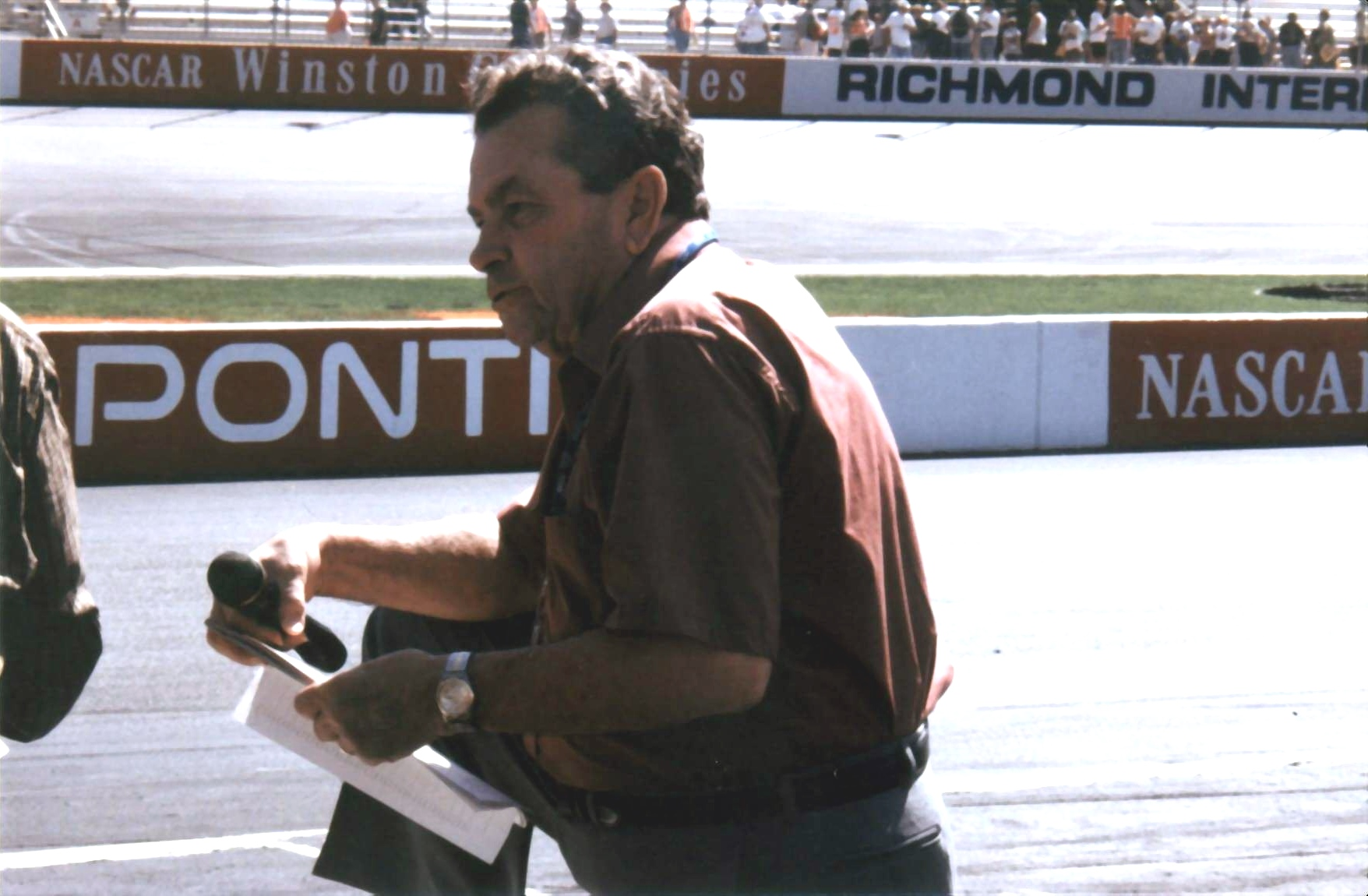
Sammy Bland at RIR

Samuel William Bland, Jr., (April 14, 1929, in Rocky Mount, North Carolina – November 9, 2018, in Harrisonburg, Virginia), was an American who was active in broadcasting and entertainment circles for more than five decades, broadcasting the first Daytona 500 stock car race, known throughout Eastern North Carolina for live television and radio performances and across the South for his syndicated "Racing News with Sammy Bland," sponsored on radio by Ford Motor Company.

== Life and career ==
He was born the son of Sam and Pearl Whitfield Bland. He assisted his family with the grocery store they owned, worked with the railroad and held a couple of other jobs to help support the family. He had his own swing band which played throughout Eastern Carolina and then founded "Sammy Bland and the Folk Caravan."

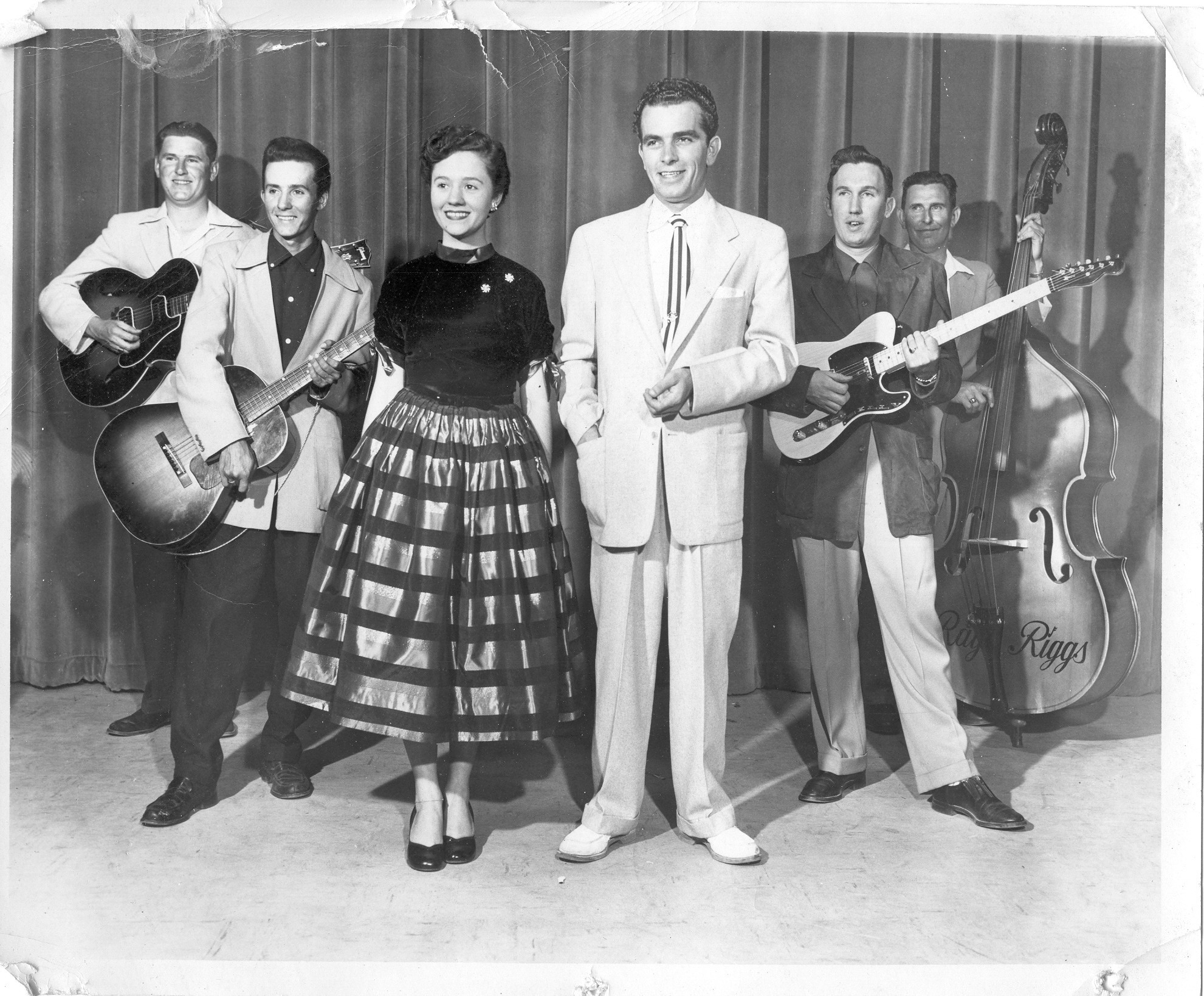
Sammy Bland, Jean Winstead and the Folk Caravan on WNCT TV in the 1950s. The variety program was the Jewel Box Jamboree

He went to work with WCEC and WFMA radio as an announcer and promoter in Rocky Mount. While there, he participated in many promotions for the community, such as living on a house boat for a week, living in a fallout shelter at the Rocky Mount Fair and other promotions. Other community happenings involved service organizations and fundraisers for charities in collaboration with the radio station.

For a short period of time, Bland traveled with Lash LaRue as an announcer for the show and appeared with many well known country music stars in Nashville, Tennessee. During this time he became a friend of Hank Williams Sr. and roomed with him in Nashville near the Grand Ole Opry.

While still with WCEC, he started and starred in his own variety show on WNCT in Greenville, North Carolina, known as the Jewel Box Jamboree. The show was live and featured local talent from the area as well as Jean Winstead (pianist and vocalist on the show) and other members of the band.

The group recorded several songs during the 1950s. Not their favorite cut, "I Just Heard The News," has been released on a country music CD entitled "Long Gone Daddy". The album, with various artists, became a top seller in Europe. The band is incorrectly identified as Sammy Bland and His Radio Boys. The band never went by that name, however Bland's photograph is featured on the front cover.

Bland worked with WCEC through the 1960s, and used that as the base for the Racing News broadcast and NASCAR Sprint Cup races which he broadcast live from the various tracks on the circuit. Included in this was the broadcast of the first Daytona 500, which landed him on the list of the top 50 Virginians in NASCAR produced during the 50th Anniversary Celebration of NASCAR. His racing network was known as the American Racing Network.

Also a track announcer at several of the tracks, including Darlington, Rockingham and Richmond International Raceway, Bland's "partner" was Ray Melton. The two of them worked with Joe Moore in his early days in the sport. Joe went with Motor Racing Network where is he now an anchor.

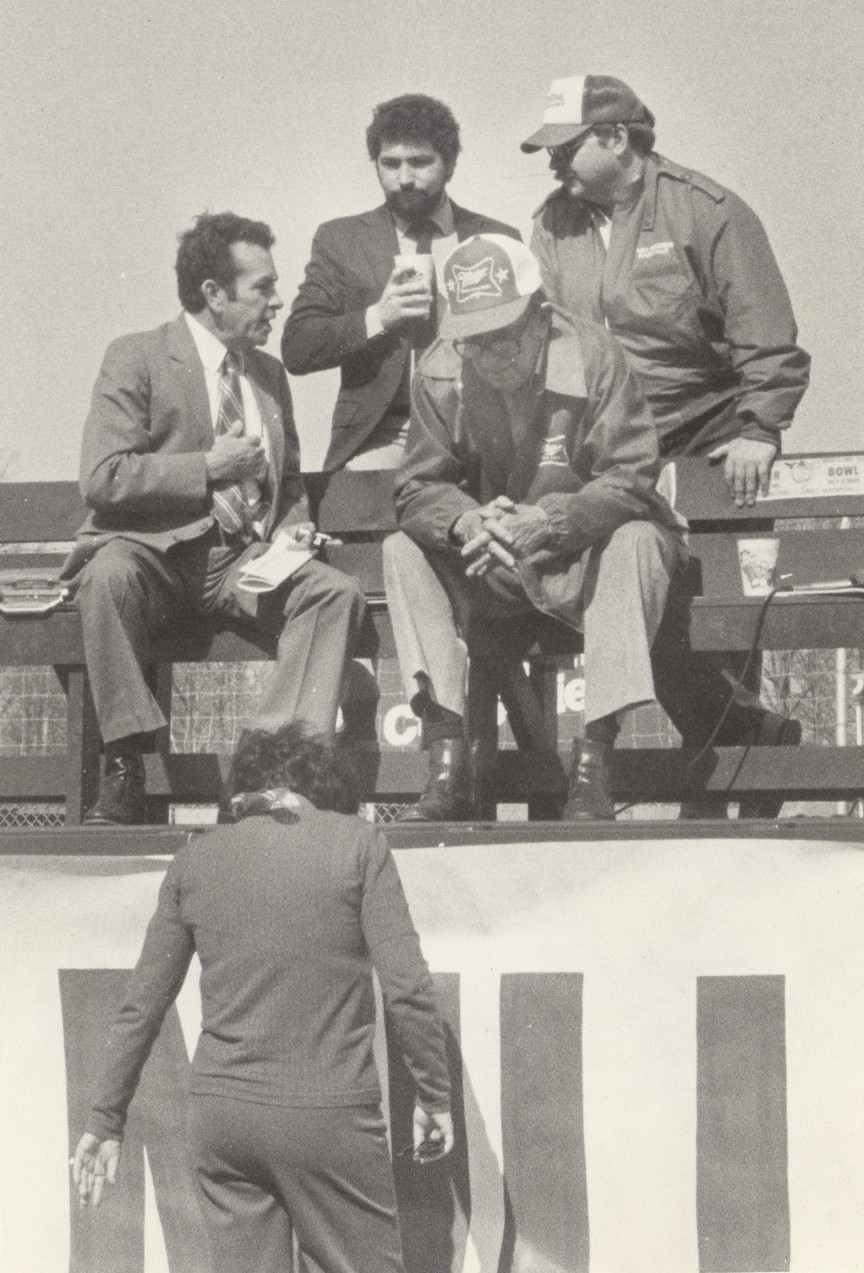
Joe Moore, Sammy Bland and Ray Melton at Richmond Fairgrounds Raceway later RIR

When Melton died in 1986, Ann B. Salster joined her father, as a track announcer at Richmond. When he decided to retire, in 2001, he had been involved in NASCAR for almost six decades. At the time they were the only father-daughter track announcing team in Winston Cup, the senior NASCAR circuit.

During the days of Racing News, another company was formed for broadcasting. The group was called BLANECA Productions – Bland, Ned Jarrett and Kenneth Campbell. Retired Cup Champion Ned Jarrett worked with Bland and Campbell on live broadcasts and prepared a racing program which became a part of the network.

Bland's closest friends in the racing circuit were Joe Weatherly, Paul Sawyer, Curtis Turner, Junior Johnson and other drivers and promoters of that time. He can be heard at the Talladega Speedway Museum announcing the crash at Charlotte Motor Speedway which caused the death of Fireball Roberts.

Bland left WCEC in the late 1960s and continued his racing broadcasts and serving as track announcer for several years. He then joined WITN-TV in Washington, North Carolina. There he was weatherman and in charge of promotions. Many young people remember his afternoon program "The Funny Page with Sammy and WITNey The Hobo." Bland and WITNey did the show live every afternoon at 5 p.m. and on many non-race weekends traveled throughout Eastern Carolina making live appearances and distributing their dolls – one side was Bland and the other side was WITNey.

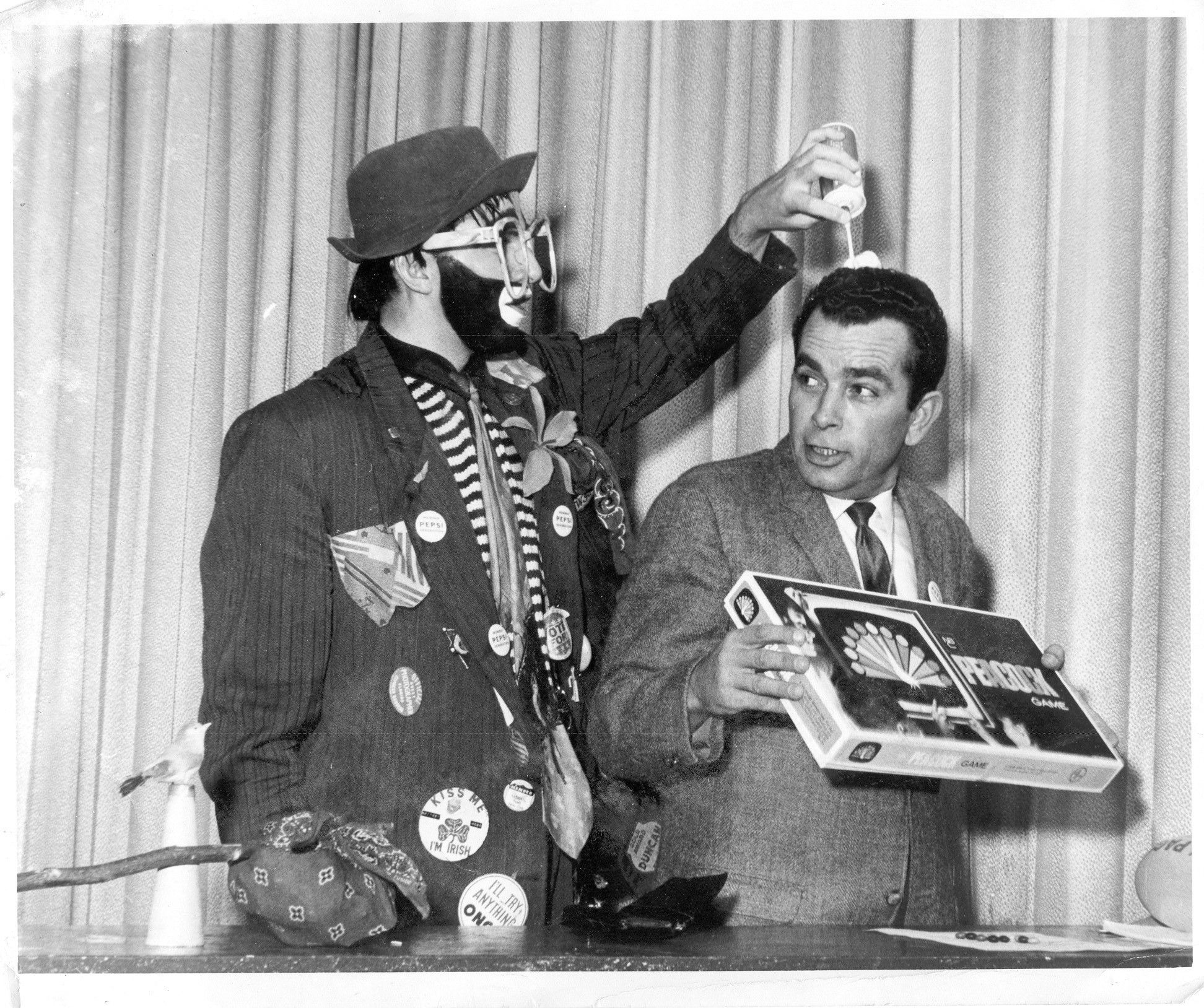
WITNey the Hobo and Bland on WITN TV

Racing News became a television program when Bland left WITN and joined WCTI in New Bern, North Carolina. Bland was vice president of sales as well as an on-air personality at the station.

In the 1970s, Bland and his family moved to Harrisonburg, Virginia. where he joined WHSV as vice president concentrating in sales and doing some on-the-air work with productions such "Talent Showcase" which was filmed at James Madison University featuring local talent. During this time he continued his work at the various tracks.

During the early 1980s, Bland moved to Charlotte Amalie in the U.S. Virgin Islands to manage the Worrell Newspaper’s TV stations there. (WHSV was a part of the Worrell chain.)

In the mid 1980s, Bland retired from broadcasting full time. He worked with his Production Company/Advertising Agency – AMR, assisted his daughter with The Amelia Bulletin Monitor newspaper in Amelia Court House, Virginia and aided his wife in the operation of The Bar-B-Que Ranch on Highway 11, north of Harrisonburg. He also continued his track announcing at Richmond International Raceway, now Richmond Raceway, until the early 2000s.

He was married to Faye Lawson Bland for 71 years. They have five children: Ann, Cindy, Sammy III, Jin and Faye; 10 grandchildren and seven great grandchildren.
