= John Bland (judge) =

Newfoundland merchant and judge

John Bland (? – c. 1825) was probably born in Devon, England and became notable in Canadian history for his time spent in Newfoundland.

Bland was probably active in Newfoundland as early as 1780 in a mercantile capacity. He became a magistrate at Bonavista, Newfoundland in 1790 and was active in commerce at that time. In 1801 he became a surrogate court judge which paid a regular salary. By that time he was well established in the community.

Bland is noteworthy for his advocacy on behalf of the Beothuk people during a documented period from 1797 to 1807 where his letters to various governors at St. Johns, including Mark Milbanke, identified a number of issues and proposed solutions.
