= Justice Bland =

Justice Bland may refer to:

- Jane Bland (born 1965), associate justice of the Supreme Court of Texas
- Hugh M. Bland (1898–1967), justice of the Arkansas Supreme Court

== See also ==
- Judge Bland (disambiguation)
