= Joseph Franklin Bland House =

Historic house in North Carolina, United States

- U.S. National Register of Historic Places
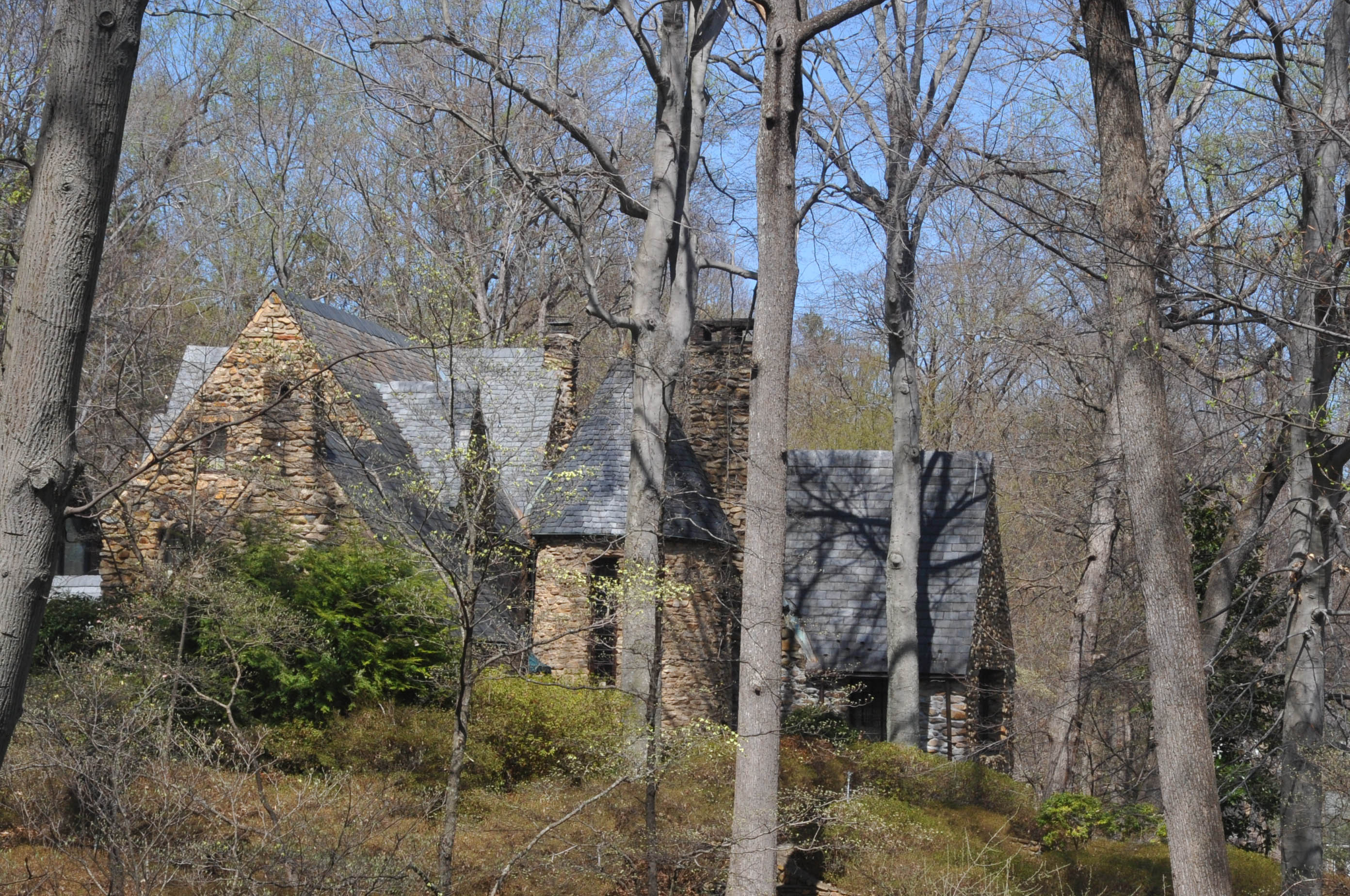
- The house in September 2007

- Location within North Carolina Location within the United States
- Location: 1809 Virginia Road, Winston-Salem, North Carolina
- Coordinates: 36°6′20″N 80°16′13″W
- Area: 2.2 acres (0.89 ha)
- Built: c. 1936–1937
- Built by: Bland, Joseph Franklin
- Architectural style: Chateauesque
- NRHP reference No.: 84002265
- Added to NRHP: August 21, 1984

The Joseph Franklin Bland House (also known as the Franklin Bland House and "The Castle") is a historic house located at Winston-Salem, Forsyth County, North Carolina.

== Description and history ==
It was built in 1936, and is a 1-1/2 and two-story, asymmetrical Châteauesque style fieldstone dwelling. It features a circular stair tower with steep conical roof, irregularly placed stone chimneys, and multiple gables. The house incorporates railroad tracks in the support system, oil drums in the porthole windows, steel pipe in the stair railing, and heavy iron bolts hand-fashioned into door hardware. It was built for Frank Bland (1888–1940), who served as the organist of the First Presbyterian and St. Paul's Episcopal churches and established the Bland Piano Company.

It was listed on the National Register of Historic Places on August 21, 1984.
