= Bland House =

Historic house in Louisiana, United States

- U.S. National Register of Historic Places
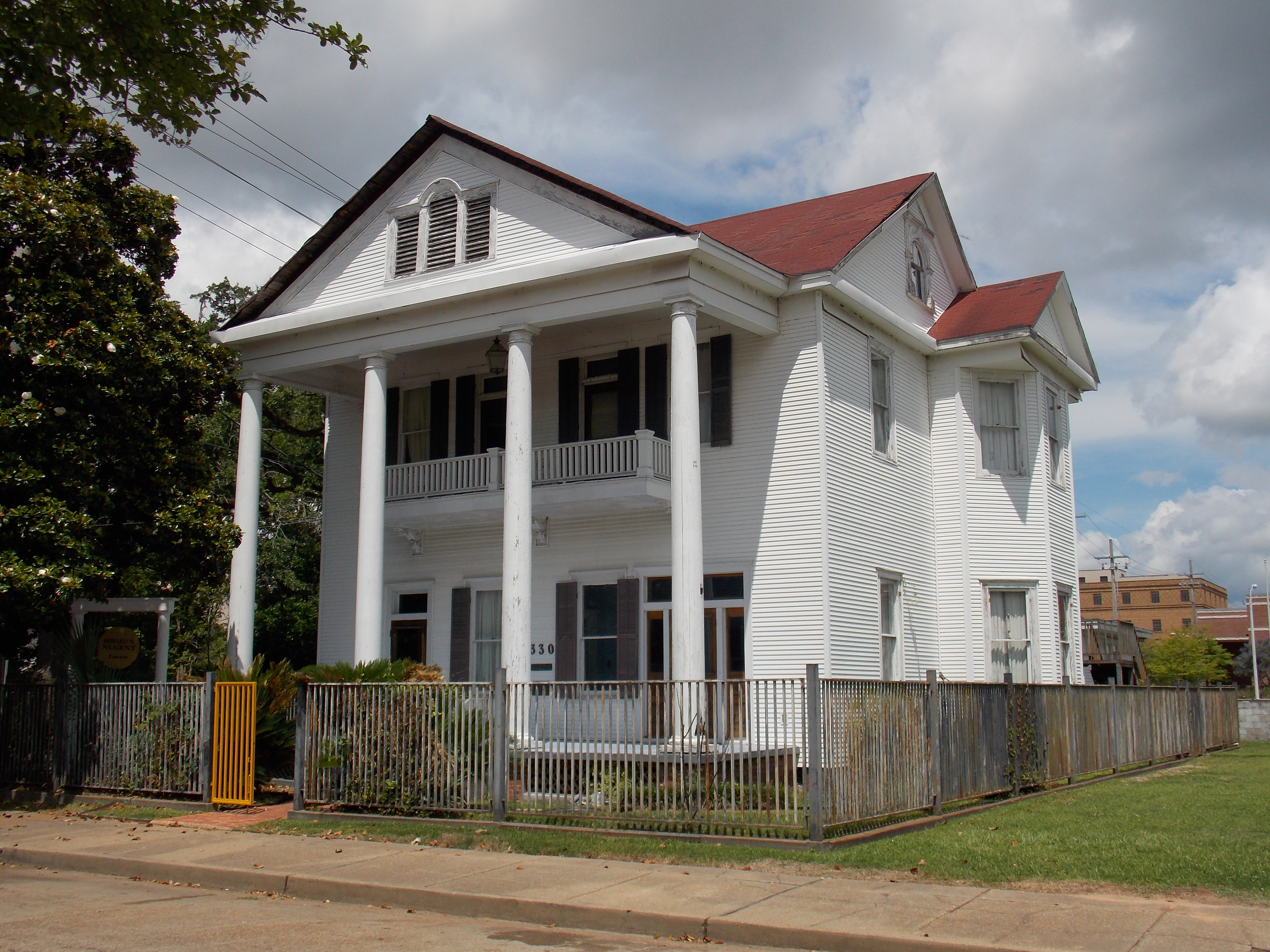

- Location within Louisiana Location within the United States
- Location: 330 Saint James St., Alexandria, Louisiana
- Coordinates: 31°18′32″N 92°26′33″W
- Area: 0.1 acres (0.040 ha)
- Built: 1910
- Architectural style: Colonial Revival
- NRHP reference No.: 85003148
- Added to NRHP: October 17, 1985

Bland House is a two-story frame Colonial Revival-style house located in Alexandria, Louisiana. It was added to the National Register of Historic Places in 1985.

It has a colossal Tuscan pedimented portico. The tympanum has a vent with a Palladian window design. The four columns' capitals are ornamented with molded leaf forms.
