= John Bland (born 1702) =

English writing-master

- Born: 17 August 1702; Crutched Friars, London, England
- Died: 21 January 1750 (aged 47); London, England
- Burial place: St Martin Outwich, Threadneedle Street, London
- Occupations: Writing-master, accountant
- Known for: Essay on Writing (1730)

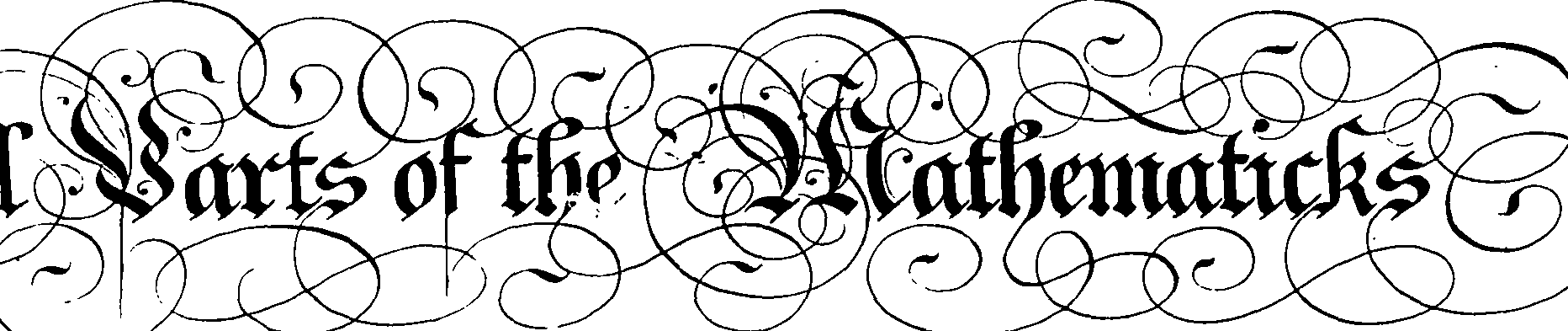
Printer's ornament from Bland's 1730 Essay on Writing

John Bland (17 August 1702 – 21 January 1750) was an English writing-master and accountant. He is known for his work on penmanship and his contributions to the teaching of commercial writing in 18th-century London.

== Early life and education ==
Bland was born on 17 August 1702 in Crutched Friars, London. His father worked as a clerk in the Victualling Office at Tower Hill. Around 1710, Bland was sent to Westminster School, where he remained for four years. After leaving Westminster, he returned to the city and became a pupil of a Mr. Snell in Foster Lane.

== Career ==
Around 1717, Bland took a clerkship at the Custom House, where he worked for nine years. During this period, he acquired extensive knowledge of ship-marks, invoices, bill-headings, applications, and petitions, which would later form the subject matter of his published copy-plates.

In 1726, Bland became a writing-master at Mr. William Watts's Academy in Little Tower Street. He remained in this position for thirteen years, during which time he issued his most notable work, the Essay on Writing, in 1730. The preface to this work was dated 13 January 1729–30. Around the same time, Bland prepared five elaborately flourished pieces of penmanship for George Bickham's Universal Penman.

In 1739, after his tenure with Mr. Watts, Bland established himself in Birchin Lane as an accountant and writing-master. The following year, in 1740, another writing-master named Joseph Champion published a work titled Penmanship, which included some specimens by Bland. In 1744, Bland relinquished his office in Birchin Lane and opened an academy in Bishopsgate Street, where he continued as headmaster until his death.

== Death and legacy ==
Bland died on 21 January 1750, aged 47, and was buried in St Martin Outwich Church at the end of Threadneedle Street. His Essay on Writing was republished in 1803, more than fifty years after his death.
