= Judge Bland =

Judge Bland may refer to:

- Oscar E. Bland (1877–1951), judge of the United States Court of Customs and Patent Appeals
- Theodorick Bland (judge) (1776–1846), judge of the United States District Court for the District of Maryland

== See also ==
- Justice Bland (disambiguation)
