= Gordon Bland =

English cricketer

Tony Bland
Personal information
- Full name: Tony Gordon Bland
- Born: 19 July 1941 (age 85); Ranworth, Norfolk, England
- Batting: Right-handed
- Bowling: Right-arm fast-medium

Domestic team information
- Years: Team
- 1965–1968: Norfolk
- Source: Cricinfo, 29 June 2011

Tony Gordon Bland (born 19 July 1941) is an English former cricketer. Bland was a right-handed batsman who bowled right-arm fast-medium. He was born in Ranworth, Norfolk.

Bland made his debut for Norfolk in the 1965 Minor Counties Championship against Lincolnshire. Bland played Minor counties cricket for Norfolk from 1965 to 1967, which included 18 Minor Counties Championship matches. He made his only List A appearance in 1968 against Cheshire in the Gillette Cup. In this match, he was dismissed for 7 runs by Arthur Sutton, while with the ball he took the wicket of Stuart Wood for the cost of 29 runs from 12 overs.
