= USS Bland =

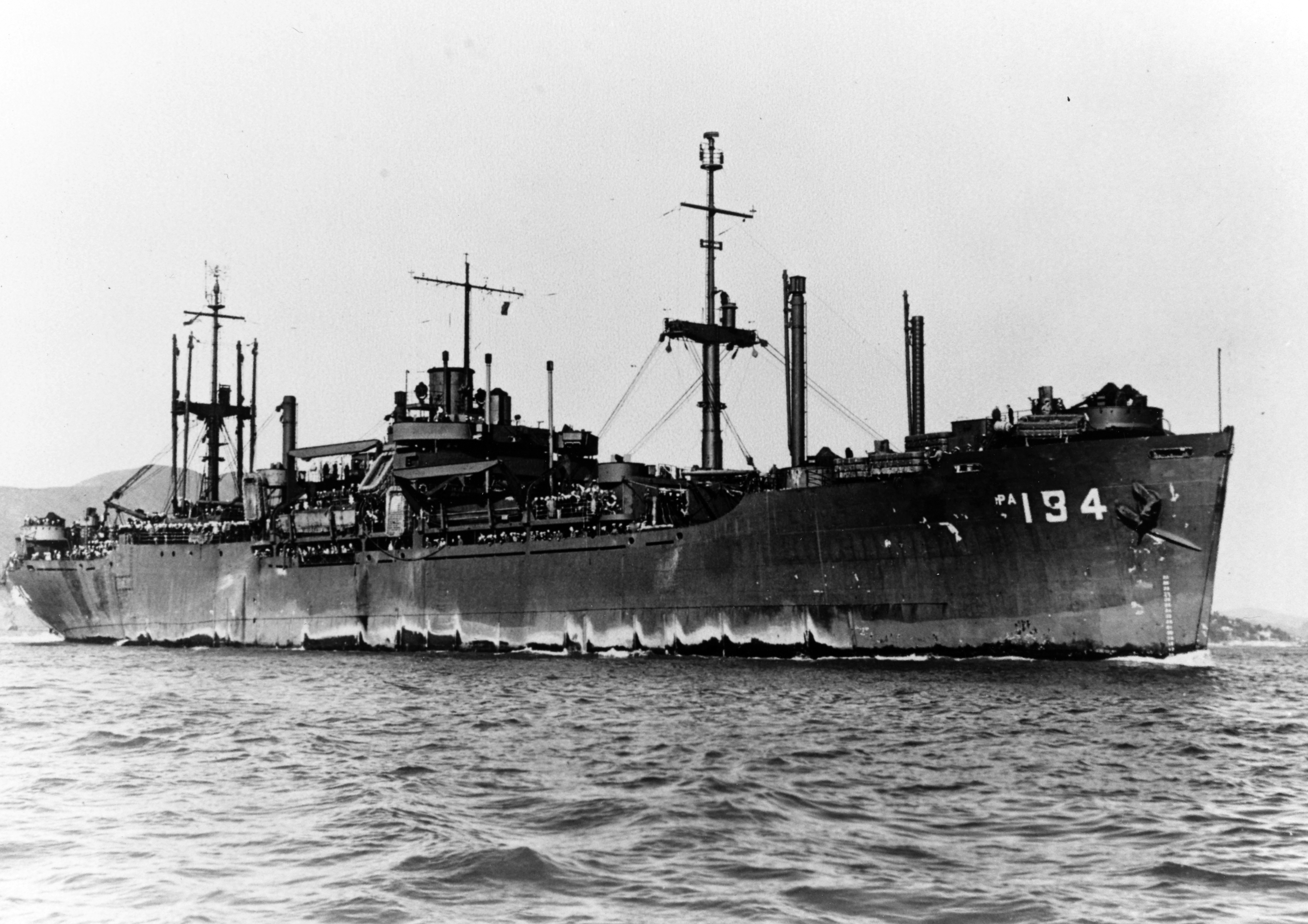

History

United States
- Name: USS Bland
- Namesake: Bland County, Virginia
- Builder: California Shipbuilding Corporation
- Laid down: 2 August 1944
- Launched: 26 October 1944
- Acquired: 14 December 1944
- Commissioned: 15 December 1944
- Decommissioned: 27 April 1946
- Stricken: 8 May 1946
- Fate: Sold for scrap, 23 January 1974

General characteristics
- Class & type: Haskell-class attack transport
- Displacement: 6,873 tons (lt), 14,837 t (fl)
- Length: 455 ft (139 m)
- Beam: 62 ft (19 m)
- Draft: 24 ft (7 m)
- Propulsion: 1 × geared turbine, 2 × header-type boilers, 1 × propeller, designed 8,500 shp (6,338 kW)
- Speed: 17 knots (31 km/h; 20 mph)
- Boats & landing craft carried: 2 × LCM; 12 × LCVP; 3 × LCPL
- Capacity: Troops: 86 officers, 1,475 enlisted; Cargo: 150,000 cu ft, 2,900 tons
- Complement: 56 officers, 480 enlisted
- Armament: 1 × 5"/38 dual-purpose gun; 4 × twin 40mm guns; 10 × single 20mm guns; late armament, add 1 × 40mm quad mount

USS Bland (APA-134) was a Haskell-class attack transport in service with the United States Navy from 1944 to 1946. She was scrapped in 1974.

== History ==
Bland (APA-134) was laid down under a Maritime Commission contract (MCV hull 50) on 2 August 1944 at Wilmington, California, by the California Shipbuilding Corp.; launched on 26 October 1944; sponsored by Mrs. Lawrence A. Collins, wife of the editor and publisher of the Long Beach, California, Independent; acquired by the Navy on a loan charter basis from the Maritime Commission on 14 December 1944; and commissioned at San Pedro, California, on 15 December 1944.

Following her shakedown training in the vicinity of Los Angeles, California, and amphibious exercises at Coronado Strand, near San Diego, California, the attack transport departed San Pedro on 5 February 1945, bound for Seattle, Washington. A strong southeasterly gale forced her to lie to for 15 hours on 7 and 8 February, but she finally reached her destination on the 9th. She then underwent a three-day voyage availability period before embarking 85 U.S. Army officers, 1,219 enlisted men, and 42 sailors on 16 February for transportation westward. She sailed for Hawaii the following day.

The ship arrived at Honolulu on Washington's Birthday and disembarked 835 men and 68 officers before embarking more westward-bound passengers, both military and civilian. She sailed for the Marshalls in convoy PD-312T. Touching briefly at Eniwetok, Bland resumed her voyage on 13 March in company with an Eniwetok-to-Guam convoy. Reaching Apra Harbor on the 13th, she embarked casualties from the invasion of Iwo Jima before heading to Hawaii alone. She arrived in Pearl Harbor on the last day of March but returned to sea again on 3 April, bound for San Francisco, California, with a mixed roster of passengers. Diverted to San Diego en route on the 5th, she reached her new destination three days later.

The ship did not linger on the U.S. West Coast for long, but sailed for Hawaii on the 17th with 1,550 passengers and reached Pearl Harbor a week later. Over the ensuing weeks, the attack transport practiced amphibious landings at both Maui and Oahu. Bland sailed for the west coast on 29 May, reached San Francisco on 4 June, and disembarked 430 sailors and marines. On 6 June, she got underway for Seattle, Washington, and reached her destination two days later.

Following voyage repairs, Bland departed Seattle on 26 June, loaded with cargo and with 1,512 soldiers embarked the previous day. En route to Okinawa, the attack transport reached Eniwetok on 8 July and remained there until pushing on for the Western Carolines six days later. Making port at Ulithi on the 18th, Bland proceeded on to Okinawa, sailing on 29 July with Convoy WOK-42. She arrived at Naha on 5 August, disembarking her passengers and unloading her cargo by means of her own landing craft at Hagushi Beach. Three days later, she sailed for Saipan.

During her time at Hagushi and the ensuing voyage to the Marianas, the atomic bombs were dropped on Hiroshima (6 August) and Nagasaki (9 August). Japan's leaders wrestled with the decision to surrender, and Bland completed her voyage, reaching Saipan on 14 August. The announcement of the war's end the following day, however, did not signal rest for the attack transport since the occupation of the former enemy's homeland still lay ahead. Ordered to the Philippines, Bland got underway on 16 August and arrived in San Pedro Bay, Leyte, four days later. She remained at anchor there for three days before sailing for Cebu. At that port, she embarked 78 officers and 1,240 men of the Americal Division and sailed for Japan on 1 September.

Leaving troops and cargo at Yokohama on 9 and 10 September, Bland headed back to the Philippines with Task Group (TG) 33.3 on 10 September. Diverted once en route to Formosa to evacuate Allied prisoners of war, Bland was rerouted again on the 12th back to her original destination, Leyte. After a three-day layover there, the attack transport sailed for Cebu where she arrived on 19 September.

Bland sailed for Japan on 25 September with elements of the Army's 77th Division embarked, as part of TG 34.8, and arrived off Hokkaidō on the 5th. She reached Otaru that day and began disembarking troops and discharging cargo lifted from the Philippines. Hers was part of the 10,000 men from the 77th Division and IX Corps put ashore to occupy Hokkaidō. Her part in the operation completed, Bland then sailed for Okinawa on the 7th.

After being rerouted once because of a typhoon, Bland reached Hagushi beach, Okinawa, on the 14th and, over the next few days, loaded stores. She then proceeded to an anchorage off Naga Wan, Okinawa, where she embarked men and cargo of the 1st Marine Division bound for the occupation of North China between 16 and 21 October. Underway on 21 October, Bland sailed for Tientsin and arrived off Taku Bar on the 24th. She commenced disembarking her marines the following day, but did not start discharging cargo until the 29th. She completed the entire process by 1 November and then began her "Operation Magic Carpet" duties by embarking men to be returned to the United States.

Underway for Korea on 5 November, Bland reached Jinsen (Inchon) the following day and embarked more dischargees before sailing for Japan on the 7th. Reaching Sasebo on the 9th, she took on additional homeward-bound servicemen and sailed for Okinawa two days later. Arriving in Buckner Bay, Okinawa, on Armistice Day 1945, Bland got underway for San Francisco three days later. While en route back to the United States, Bland rendezvoused with the Liberty Ship SS Leonidas Merritt on 20 November to take on board a man "in dire need of medical care" and diverted briefly to Midway Island the following day before resuming her homeward course. She arrived at San Francisco on 3 December 1945 and disembarked her passengers before shifting to Hunter's Point for voyage repairs. On 15 December she sailed for the Philippines for her second Magic Carpet run.

=== Decommissioning and fate ===
Bland completed this mission and carried out one more Magic Carpet voyage before departing San Francisco on 7 February 1946 and proceeding, via Panama, to the U.S. East Coast. She reached Norfolk, Virginia, on 7 March and was decommissioned there on 27 April 1946. Bland was turned over to the War Shipping Administration the next day, and her name was struck from the Navy list on 8 May 1946. Placed in reserve in the James River, she was ultimately sold to the Consolidated Steel Corp. of Brownsville, Texas, on 23 January 1974, along with sisterships USS Bandera (AP-131), USS Buckingham (APA-141), USS Drew (APA-162) and USS Eastland (APA-163) for scrap.
