= Sir John Bland, 4th Baronet =

English politician

Sir John Bland, 4th Baronet (2 November 1663 – 25 October 1715) was an English Tory politician and peer. He sat as MP for Appleby in 1681 and Pontefract in 1690, 1698, February 1701, December 1701, 1702, 1705, 1708 and 1710.

He was the second son of Sir Francis Bland, 2nd Baronet and Jane, the daughter of Sir William Lowther. He was matriculated at University College, Oxford in 1679. On 31 March 1685, he married Anne (died 28 August 1734), the daughter of Sir Edward Mosley, 2nd Baronet (and later the patron of St Ann's Church, Manchester) and they had four sons (three predeceased him). He succeeded his brother as baronet on 14 December 1667.
