= Sir Edward Mosley, 2nd Baronet =

English politician

Sir Edward Mosley, 2nd Baronet (1639 – 14 October 1665), of Hulme, Lancashire, was an English politician who sat in the House of Commons from 1661 to 1665.

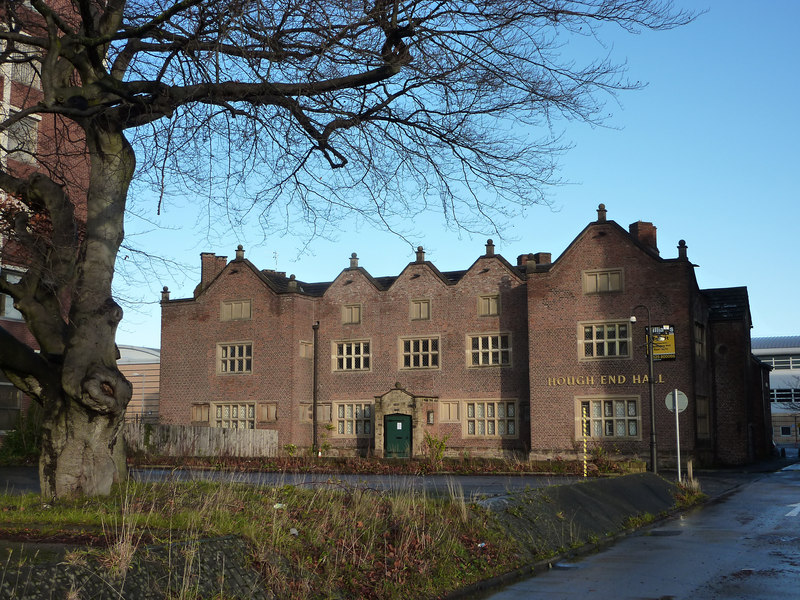
Hough End Hall, Manchester

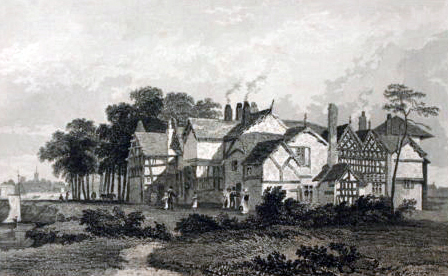
Hulme Hall, Hulme, Manchester

Mosley was the son of Sir Edward Mosley, 1st Baronet, of Rolleston, Staffordshire. He matriculated at Brasenose College, Oxford, on 28 March 1655. He succeeded to the baronetcy on the death of his father in December 1657, inheriting his Rolleston and Hough End estates in Lancashire. He was pricked Sheriff of Lancashire in November 1660 but was replaced by December 1660.

In 1661, Mosley was elected Member of Parliament for Mitchell, sitting until his death. The same year he purchased the estate of Hulme, now in Manchester.

Mosley died at Hough End and was buried at Didsbury on 21 October 1665, and the Baronetcy became extinct.

Mosley married Katharine Grey, daughter of William Grey, 1st Baron Grey of Werke, and his wife Priscilla, or Cecilia Wentworth, daughter of Sir John Wentworth in April 1665, . His widow enjoyed the estate of Rolleston in dower and married by licence dated 6 April 1667, Charles North who became Lord Grey of Rolleston on 24 October 1673. Mosley's estates were inherited by a cousin.

== See also ==
- Hulme Hall, Hulme
- Mosley baronets

Baronetage of England
Preceded by Edward Mosley	Baronet of Rolleston; 1657–1665	Extinct
