= Joseph Edward Bland =

American politician (1866–1945)

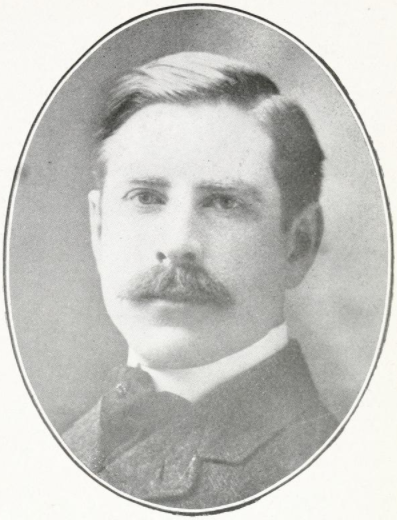

Member of the Michigan Senate from the 3rd district
- In office January 1, 1907 – January 1, 1909
- Preceded by: Noble Ashley
- Succeeded by: John Donald M. MacKay

Member of the Michigan House of Representatives from the Wayne County 1st district
- In office January 1, 1905 – January 1, 1907
- In office January 1, 1901 – January 1, 1903

Personal details
- Born: May 5, 1866 London, Ontario
- Died: October 2, 1945 (aged 79) Lakeland, Florida
- Party: Republican
- Education: University of Michigan Law School

Military service
- Allegiance: United States
- Branch/service: United States Navy
- Battles/wars: Spanish–American War

Joseph Edward Bland, also known as J. Edward Bland, (May 5, 1866 – October 2, 1945) was a Michigan politician.

== Early life and education ==
Bland was born on May 5, 1866, in London, Canada West. Bland's parents were of an Irish branch of an English family. Bland was educated in the United States. He went to public school and business college before attending the University of Michigan Law School. There, Bland earned a Bachelor of Laws, and a Master of Laws degree in 1896.

== Career ==
Bland practiced law in Detroit. At some point, Bland had a few years' residency in California. Bland enlisted into the United States Navy during the Spanish–American War. He was on the crew of the USS Yosemite. After his time in the navy, Bland remained active in the naval militia. On November 6, 1900, Bland was elected to the Michigan House of Representatives where he represented the Wayne County 1st district from January 1, 1901, to January 1, 1903. He served another term from January 1, 1905, to January 1, 1907. In the state house, from 1905 to 1906, Bland was the chair of the committee on game laws. In the book The Men of '05, editor Harry M. Nimmo criticized Bland's ability to regulate gambling properly due to Bland's gambling tendencies. Nimmo then expressed that Bland was one to fight for the common man as opposed to the wealthy, citing Bland's demand to regulate electric rail fares. On November 6, 1906, Bland was elected to the Michigan Senate where represented the 3rd district from January 1, 1907, to January 1, 1909.

== Personal life ==
Bland was unmarried by the time of his second term in the state house in 1905. This fact is poked fun at in Harry M. Nimmo's book, The Men of '05.

== Death ==
Bland died on October 2, 1945, in Lakeland, Florida.
