= Bland baronets =

Extinct baronetcy in the Baronetage of England

The Bland Baronetcy, of Kippax Park in the County of York, was a title in the Baronetage of England. It was created on 30 August 1642 for Thomas Bland, of Kippax Park, near Leeds, Yorkshire, in honour of his father's service to King Charles I. The third Baronet succeeded his father as an infant, died at the age of five and was succeeded by his brother who was Member of Parliament for Appleby 1681 and for Pontefract 1698–1713. The fifth Baronet represented Lancashire 1713–27 and the sixth Baronet served as member for Ludgershall 1754–5. His brother succeeded in 1755 but died in 1756, at which time the baronetcy became extinct.

The Kippax estate fell to Thomas Davison of Blakiston Hall who married a daughter of the sixth Baronet and then to their son Thomas Davison Bland. The Davison Blands lived at Kippax until 1928. Kippax Hall was demolished in the 1950s.

== Bland baronets, of Kippax Park (1642) ==
- Sir Thomas Bland, 1st Baronet (1614–1657)
- Sir Francis Bland, 2nd Baronet (1642–1663)
- Sir Thomas Bland, 3rd Baronet (1662–1668)
- Sir John Bland, 4th Baronet (1663–1715)
- Sir John Bland, 5th Baronet (1691–1743)
- Sir John Bland, 6th Baronet (1722–1755)
- Sir Hungerford Bland, 7th Baronet (1726–1756)
