= Falchion =

One-handed, single-edged sword

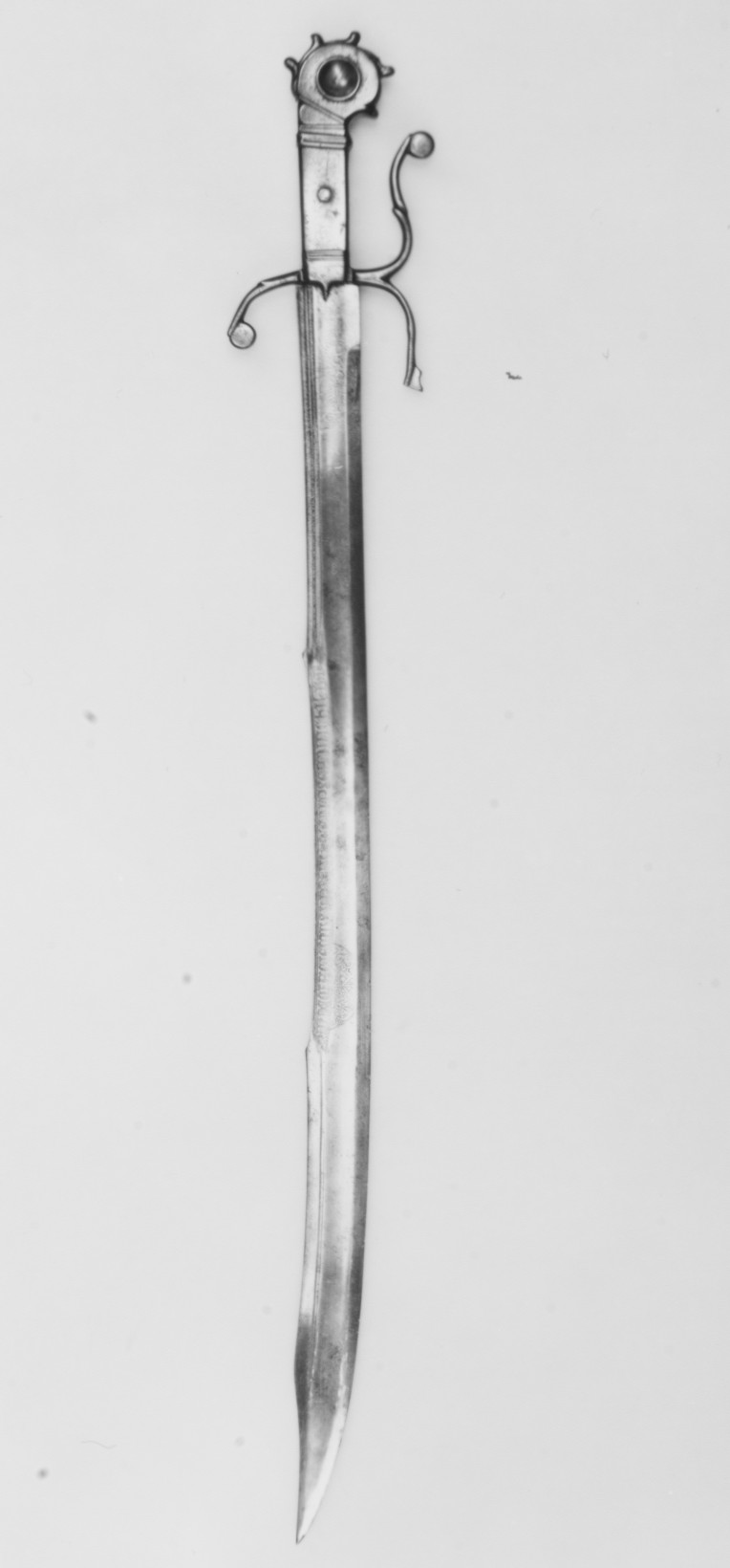
- Falchion – Italy, 15th century
- Type: Sword
- Place of origin: France

Production history
- Produced: 13th–16th centuries
- Variants: See Elmslie typology

Specifications
- Blade type: Generally single-edged, curved (occasionally straight)
- Hilt type: After an arming sword

A falchion (/ˈfɔːltʃən/; Old French: fauchon; Latin: falx, "sickle") is a one-handed, single-edged 32–38-inch (81–97 cm) sword of European origin. Falchions are found in different forms from around the 13th century up to and including the 16th century. In some versions, the falchion looks rather like the seax and later the sabre, and in other versions more like a machete with a crossguard.

== Types ==
The blade designs of falchions varied widely across the continent and over time. They almost always included a single edge with a slight curve on the blade towards the point on the end and most were also affixed with a quilloned crossguard for the hilt in the manner of the contemporary arming swords. Unlike the double-edged swords of Europe, few actual swords of this type have survived to the present day; fewer than a dozen specimens are currently known. A number of weapons similar to the falchion existed in Western Europe, including the Messer, hanger and the backsword. Two basic types of falchion can be identified:

=== Cleaver falchions ===
One of the few surviving falchions (the Conyer's falchion) is shaped very much like a large cleaver or machete. This type is also illustrated in art. The type seems to be confined to the 13th and 14th centuries. However apart from the profile they present a very thin blade, often only 1.2 mm (0.047 in) thick spines, 7 cm (2.8 in) from the point with a slight taper leading near to the edge before dropping into a secondary bevel which brings the blade to a very acute edge while maintaining some durability. A current theory is that this style emerged to defeat cloth armour.

=== Cusped falchions ===
The majority of the depictions in art reflect a design similar to that of the großes Messer. The Thorpe Falchion, a surviving example from England's 13th century, was just under 904 grams (1.99 lb) in weight. Of its 956 millimetres (37.6 inches) length, 803 millimetres (31.6 in) are the straight blade which bears a cusped or flare-clipped tip similar to the much later kilij of Turkey. This type of sword continued in use into the 16th century.

=== Other falchions ===
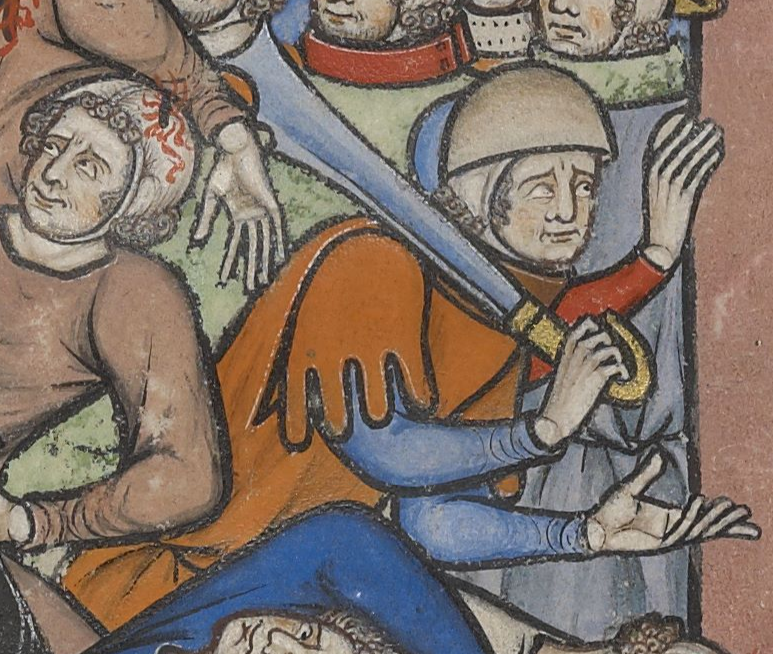
Subtype of 'umbrella hilted' falchion, from the Morgan Bible

In addition, there are a group of 13th- and early 14th-century weapons sometimes identified with the falchion. These have a falchion-like blade mounted on a wooden shaft 1–2 ft (30–61 cm) long, sometimes ending in a curve like an umbrella. These are seen in numerous illustrations in the mid-13th-century Maciejowski Bible.

== Elmslie typology ==
Produced by bladesmith and historian James Elmslie, this typology continuously seeks to systematically classify medieval single edged swords, similar to the way Oakeshott typology addresses double edged swords of the same period. The Elmslie typology covers all types of single edged swords from the period, which encompasses all types of falchion, as well as similar sword types such as falcastro, messers, tessak, storta, early sabres, as well as transitional forms.

== Status ==
An unsolved mystery exists as to why there is such a large discrepancy between the frequency of falchions in period art, contrasted with the amazingly few surviving falchions from the medieval period. Currently, there are fewer than 30 confirmed surviving medieval falchions, contrasted with the thousands of straight double edged swords from the same period. Current research by James Elmslie suggests that the overrepresentation in medieval artwork may be a form of artistic short-hand to convey certain meanings, such as indicating who the story enemies are, as falchions are overrepresented in 'villainous' characters, such as biblical enemies, or non-Christian barbarians.

Falchions are sometimes misunderstood and thought of as being similar to machetes; however, the ancient falchions that have been discovered are very thin and on average, lighter than a double-edged blade. These weapons were therefore not cleaving or chopping weapons similar to the machete, but quick slashing weapons more similar to shamshir or sabres despite their wide blade.

Unlike Central European messers, and smaller fighting knives such as tesak which could be of very crude construction and at times were popular among the peasantry, surviving Falchions display high levels of craftsmanship, oftentimes with intricately decorated pommels of bronze, and may feature inscribed blades of latten. While some forms of falchions may blur the line between sword and tool (in particular early forms Lombardy), and are depicted being used by common infantry, surviving examples are shown to be handsome weapons of status; the Conyers falchion belonged to a landed family, and the falchion is shown in illustrations of combat between mounted knights. Some later falchions were ornate and used by the nobility; there is an elaborately engraved and gold plated falchion from the 1560s in the Wallace Collection, engraved with the personal coat of arms of Cosimo I de' Medici, Grand Duke of Tuscany.

== Popular culture ==
- A falchion was used by the Minotaur General Otmin, leader for the White Witch's army in The Chronicles of Narnia: The Lion, the Witch and the Wardrobe.
- In Sailor Moon, Sailor Uranus' Space Sword is themed after a falchion.
- In Brisingr, Eragon uses a falchion after he loses his first sword, Zar'roc, in the climactic battle of Eldest. The weapon is suggested to him on the basis that he has learned to fight with a weapon impervious to damage, and thus requires a weapon more durable against edge damage. Nonetheless, the falchion is later shattered in a fight, and is replaced by Eragon's third and final sword, Brisingr.
- In the Fire Emblem series, several games feature a magical sword named Falchion. However, the swords themselves feature the more common medieval straight double-edged blade.
- In the video game Dungeons & Dragons Online, the falchion is a curved blade wielded with two hands rather than one.
- Falchions feature in the 2018 video game Kingdom Come: Deliverance.
- In the dramatic monologue "Excelsior," the eye of the young man carrying the banner is compared to a "faulchion" flashing from its sheath.

== See also ==
- Cutlass
- Terciado
