= Chaps (disambiguation) =

Chaps are protective clothing for the legs.

- Chaps (brand), a brand of Ralph Lauren Corporation
- The Brothers Chaps, creators of the Homestar Runner series of animated cartoons
- Gaiters, or half-chaps
- Chaplain, especially in military contexts
- CHAPS, Clearing House Automated Payment System, a British financial company
- Combined heat and power solar, a photovoltaic technology
- CHAPS (health organisation), a partnership of UK organisations promoting gay men's health
- CHAPS detergent, zwitterionic detergent used in the laboratory to solubilize biological macromolecules such as proteins

== See also ==
- Bath chaps, a meat dish made of pig cheek
- Chap (disambiguation)
- Chappes (disambiguation)
