= Chappe =

Chappe may refer to:

- Claude Chappe (1763 – 1805), French inventor
- David Chappe (1947 - 2002), American screenwriter
- Georges Chappe (b. 1944), French cyclist
- Jean-Baptiste Chappe d'Auteroche (1722-1769), French astronomer
- Rain-guard or "chappe" of a sword, different from a chape
- Chappe (crater), lunar crater
- 16238 Chappe, main belt asteroid
- a flap of leather attached to a sword's crossguard, also known as a rain-guard
- Chappe, museum and an arthouse by the Sea in Tammisaari, Finland

== See also ==
- Chap (disambiguation)
- Chappes (disambiguation)
