= Chap =

Chap may refer to:

- Chap (instrument), a Southeast Asian percussion instrument
- Chap Petersen (born 1968), American politician and Virginia state senator
- Chap, Virginia, United States, an unincorporated community
- The Chap, a British magazine
- The Chap (band), an experimental pop band from North London
- Chap, a caste in the Bhakkar district of the Punjab, Pakistan

CHAP may stand for:

- Challenge-Handshake Authentication Protocol, a computer networking authentication system
- Combined Heat And Power, cogeneration, the use of a heat engine or a power station to simultaneously generate both electricity and useful heat
- Comprehensive Health Assessment Program, a tool used for keeping medical histories of people with intellectual disabilities
- Community Health Accreditation Program, an independent, US not-for-profit accrediting body for health care organizations
- Commission for Historical and Architectural Preservation, a Baltimore, Maryland authority that oversees historic properties in the city
- CHAP-FM, a rebroadcaster of CHYC-FM in Chapleau, Ontario, Canada
- CHAP (AM), a 1970s radio station in Longlac, Ontario, Canada

== See also ==
- CHAP domain, in molecular biology a region of amino acids found in proteins
- Chap boot, a type of footwear
- Chap Chap, a village in Iran
- Chaps (disambiguation)
- Chappe (disambiguation)
