= Chape =

Protective fitting at the tip of a scabbard

The scabbard "chape" is labelled 10.

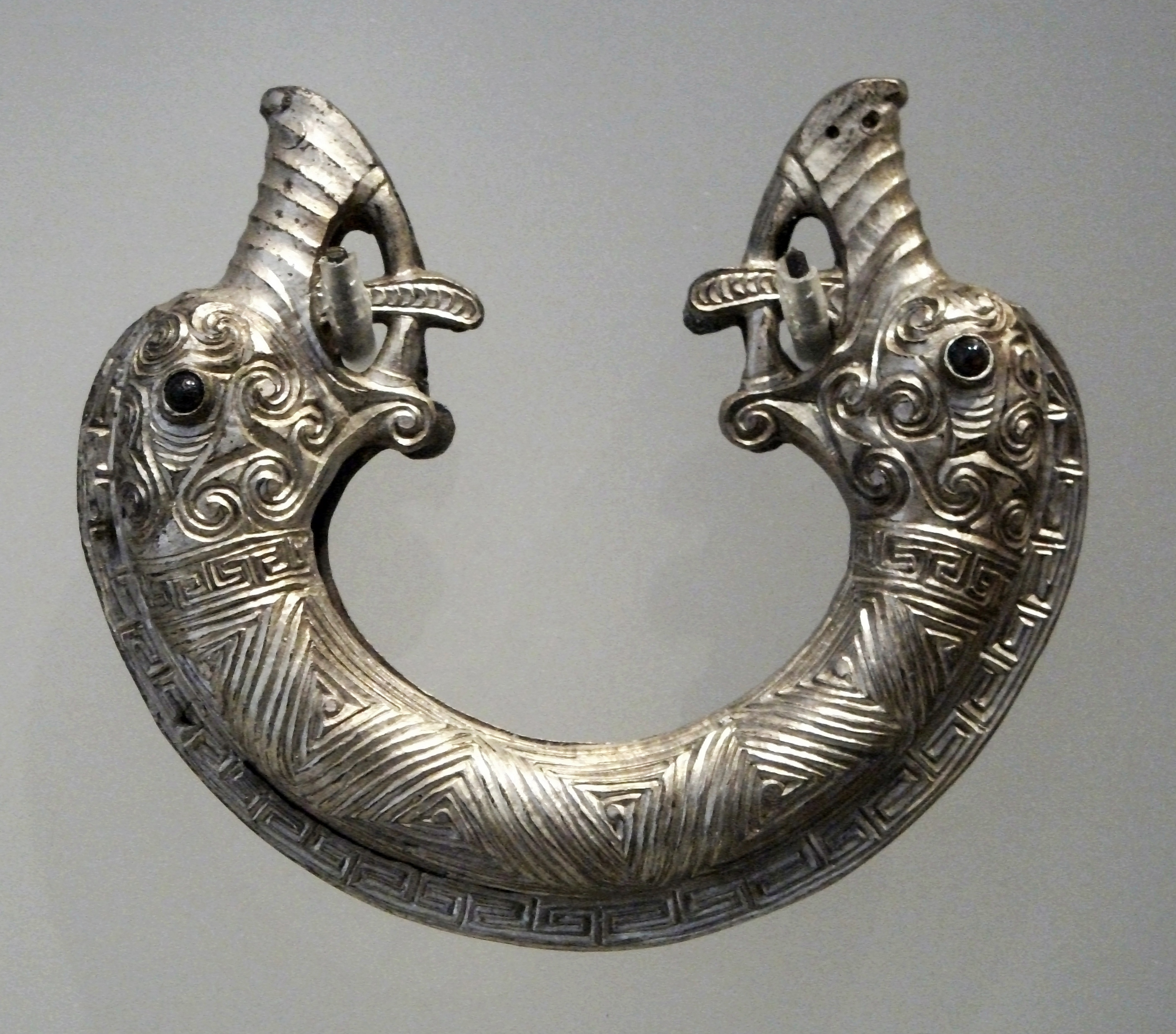
Scabbard chape from the St Ninian's Isle Treasure

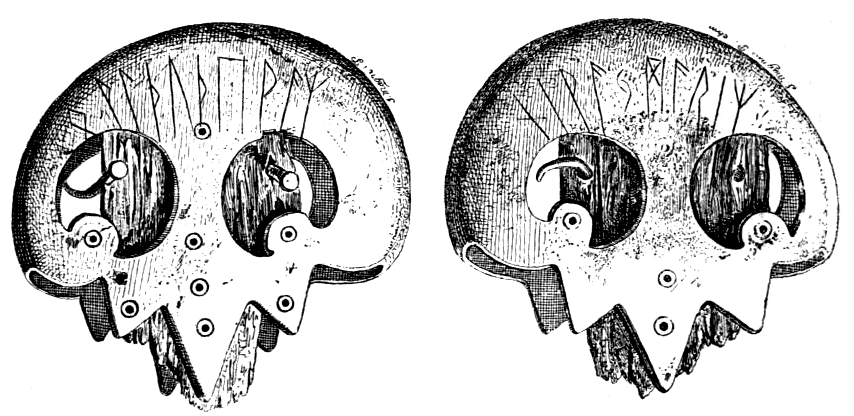
Illustration of the Thorsberg chape showing the runic inscriptions on both sides

Chape has had various meanings in English, but the predominant one is a protective fitting at the tip of a scabbard or sheath for a sword or dagger (10 in the diagram). Historic blade weapons often had leather scabbards with metal fittings at either end, sometimes decorated. These are generally either in some sort of U shape, protecting the edges only, or a pocket shape covering the sides of the scabbard as well. The reinforced end of a single-piece metal scabbard can also be called the chape.

The scabbard chape is not to be confused with the chappe, a French term - rain-guard in English - on the sword itself, a fitting at the top of the blade in late medieval weapons, just below the crossguard of the hilt. The chappe fitted outside the scabbard, presumably helping to hold the sword snugly and preventing rain coming in (4 in the diagram). This would typically have been of leather, though everything about these is uncertain as few original examples have survived, and they are mainly known from art.

== Etymology ==
The word derives from the Latin "cappa", meaning hood or cape, or tip or head.

== Archaeology ==
With the "locket" or "throat" fitting at the top, open, end of the scabbard (9 in the diagram; confusingly, in French this is a chappe), the chape is often the only part of a scabbard to survive in the ground for archaeologists to find. Notable scabbard chapes include the Germanic Thorsberg chape, with an inscription in runes, from about 200 AD. A striking silver chape terminating in the heads of animals or monsters from the St Ninian's Isle Treasure is now in the Museum of Scotland in Edinburgh. This might be Anglo-Saxon or Scottish or Pictish, and dates to about 800 AD. Perhaps the most interesting period for chapes is Celtic art, where a variety of shapes and ornament were used.

== Buckle chape ==
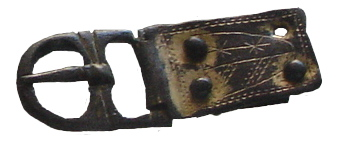
A buckle chape; this is the plate on the right. It connects the buckle to the (missing) strap.

A buckle chape is the plate or fitting connecting some buckles to their belt or strap.
