= Elmslie typology =

Medieval sword classification system

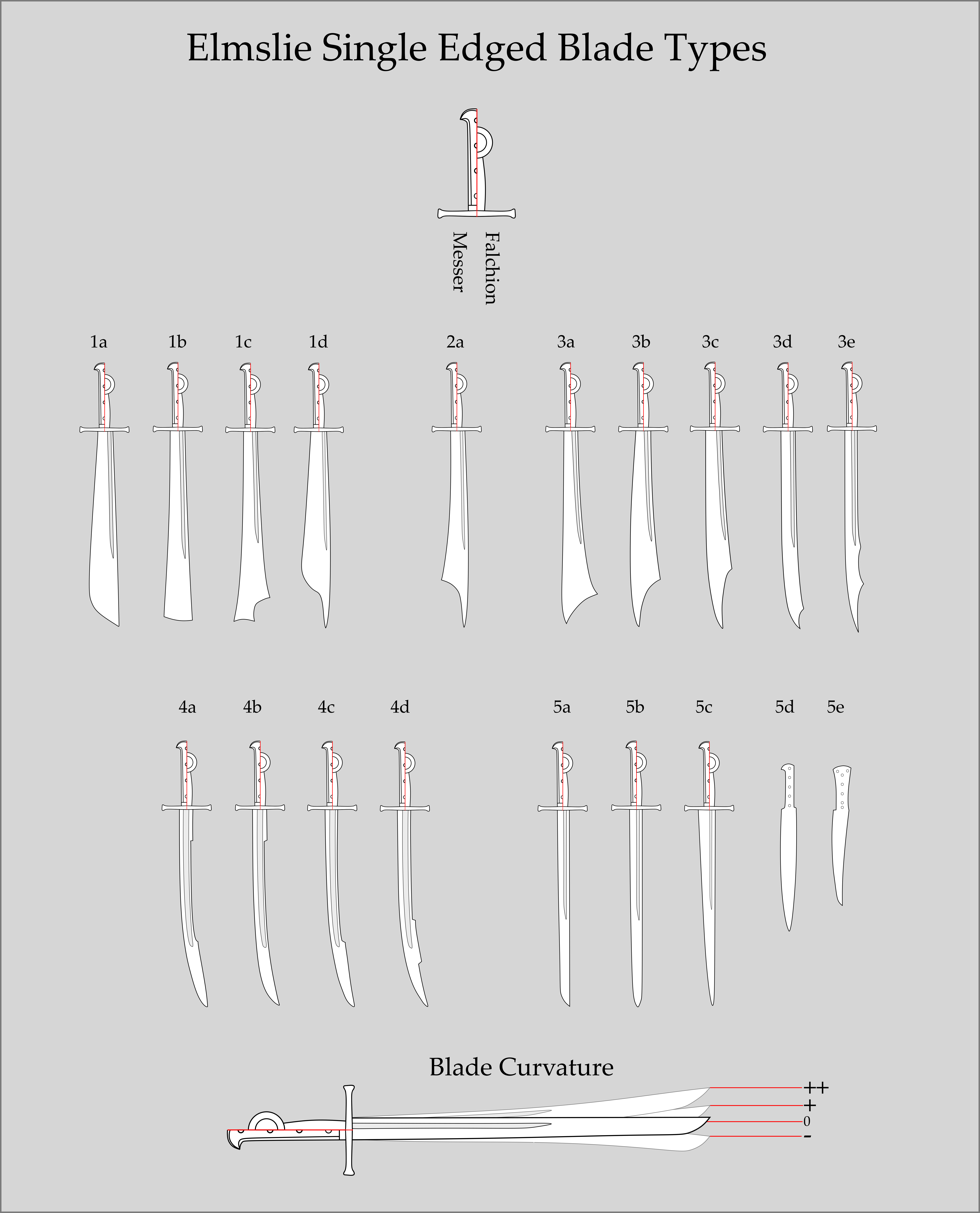
Elmslie Blade types

The Elmslie typology is a system for classification and description of single edged European bladed weapons of the late medieval and early baroque period, from around 1100 to 1550. It is designed to provide terminology for single edged arms in archaeological finds and in artistic depictions. It includes swords which are from the European Middle Ages (approximately 11th through 16th centuries) and breaks them down into five main types, each of which has several subtypes. Historian and bladesmith James Elmslie introduced the typology 2015, as a complement to the Oakeshott typology, which covers double edged swords of the same periods.

== Criteria of definition ==
Criteria for the typology were, in order of priority:

- that it should be simple enough for the basic system to be learnt and remembered without needing constant reference to the published source
- that it should be possible to apply both to hands-on analysis of archaeological objects, and to manuscript depictions, photographic observations and similar art sources, where exact measurement is impossible
- that it should avoid re-inventing the wheel for elements already found in existing publications.

For this reason, because falchions and single edged swords usually follow the same construction and stylistic fashions as contemporary double edged medieval swords, the primary elements of hilt construction are built upon the framework provided by the published work of Ewart Oakeshott, The Sword in the Age of Chivalry.

The typological classification for single-edged arms follows formula:

F3c (+), Style 7, form J1

wherein:

- “F” represents the style of hilt construction. Values include F, signifying Falchion (sword-like structures); M, signifying Messer (large knife-hilted weapons of sword-like sizes); and K, signifying smaller knife-like forms including Bauernwehr, Rugger, and Tesak (ranging from pocket knife sizes to that of a large bowie knife). By Elmslie’s own admission, this grouping is often reductive and many swords will fall in-between the clear cut definitions of these terms; it is not intended to be an essential part of the classification, but rather a prefix to aid in description.
- “3c” indicates the blade type. Values range from 1 to 5, with subtypes indicated by alphabetical symbols. These are illustrated in the accompanying chart.
- “(+)” indicates the degree of blade curvature. Values are “-”, “0”, “+”, “++”, and “+++”. The symbol describes the blade profile compared to an imaginary straight line projecting from the hilt toward the tip, and can be represented as either a positive or negative. E.g. a sword which curves very sharply up from the hilt would be “(+++)”. A blade which is straight can either be given the suffix "0", or omitted entirely.
- “Style 7” indicates the style of cross guard, and is the same as the Oakeshott Typology with additions made by Marko Aleksic and Elmslie. Values range from 1 to 14.
- “Form J1” indicates the style of pommel, also conforming to Oakeshott typology with additions by Elmslie. Values range from A to Z, with subtypes indicated by numerical symbols. Elmslie’s additions to the typology are indicated by double alphabetical symbols (AA, BB, CC, etc.).

Fullers or grooves in the blade are not classified under the typology. Instead, they are intended to be left for supplemental notes. For example, the hypothetical sample blade “F3c (+), Style 7, form J1” could be noted as "F3c (+), Style 7, form J1, One narrow fuller close to the spine", or "F3c (+), Style 7, form J1, Blade faces ground with three parallel fullers", as appropriate for any fullers it may exhibit. Fullers were intentionally omitted from the typology to keep the blade profiles at a manageable number, rather than having hundreds of possible variations based on different fuller configurations.

== Elmslie types ==
=== Type 1 ===
While single edged swords and fighting knives (seax) were used in Europe through the Viking period, they appear to have declined in popularity in the 10th century, with their use becoming close to extinct in the 11th century. It has been suggested the reason for this decline was through changes in religious dogma, which made such weapons unpopular amongst followers of Western Christianity. It has been noted that single edged arms in Scandinavian and Baltic regions which adopted Christianity later than western Europe retained the use of single-edged arms, before abandoning them on their own conversion to Christianity. For more than 200 years the predominant type of sword in Western Europe was straight and double edged, corresponding to the Oakeshott Typology Type X to XIII. The re-introduction of single edged arms began with the Type 1 blades in the early 13th century. These are characterized by short, but very broad blades, widening towards the tip.

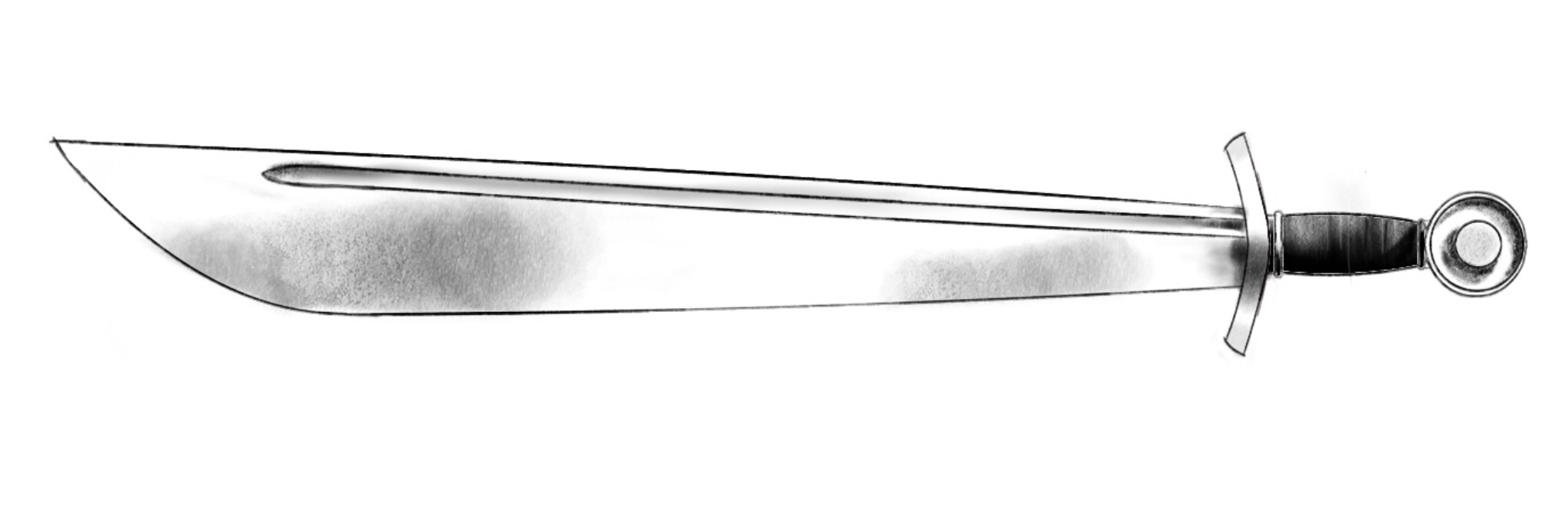
Type 1a after the Cluny Falchion

Subtype 1a The classic shape medieval falchion which is seen in numerous medieval manuscripts and in several surviving archaeological examples (for example, Durham Cathedral's "Conyers falchion"). Most likely originating around 1230 AD, and perhaps remaining in use for 100 years, these blades are characterized by a flaring profile, and broad, abrupt tip.

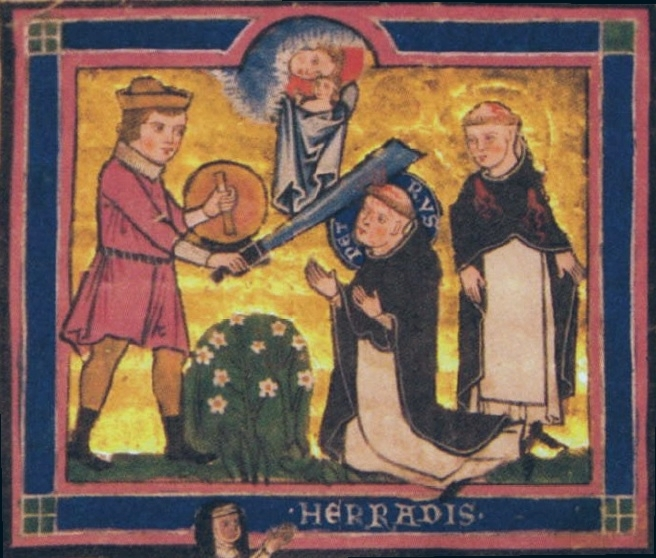
Type 1b Falchion from 1270

Manuscript art indicates they may have been straight, or curved in either direction. Most surviving examples, however, are only very gently curved on the spine. Although these blades have often been erroneously compared to modern machetes due to the superficial similarities in profile, in cross section these swords began at a much thicker 4-5mm at the base of the blade, and tapered down to less than 2mm at the broadest point, dramatically changing their handling characteristics. Additionally their cross section is that of a wedge, with a primary bevel running from the apex all the way to the spine of the blade, making them highly effective cutting weapons against textiles or un-armoured targets.

Subtype 1b This subtype is noted for having a squared-off, or flat tip, without any point. An example of the type of blade profile is found in the illustration of a foot soldier by Villiard De Honnencourt. While common in manuscript art and marginalia, there are no known examples in the archeological record.

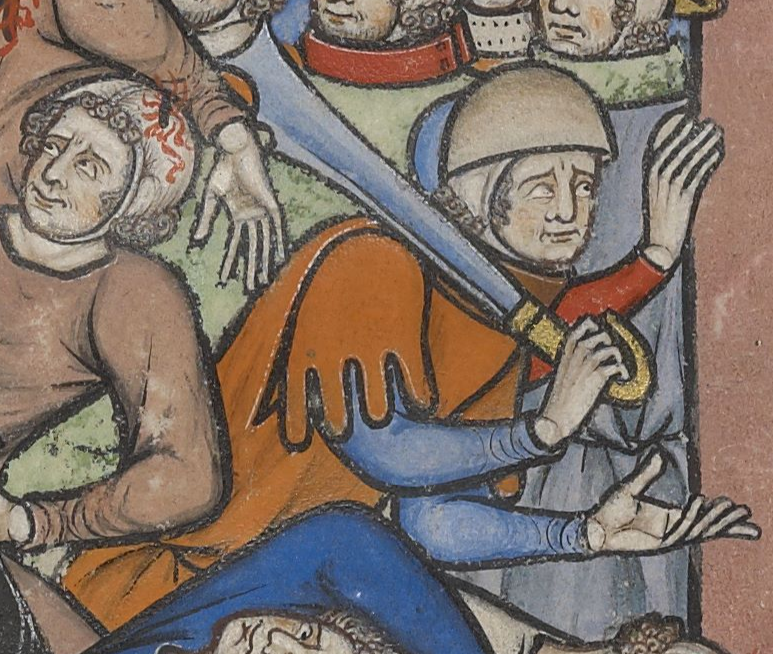
Type 1c from the Morgan Bible

Subtype 1c Characterized by having scalloped ends, and clipped backs, these types of blades are most famous for appearing in the Maciejowski Bible. Often these specific blades are mounted on a ‘knife like’ hilt with a whittle tang, which may or may not be curved. Elmslie at times has described these as both ‘proto-messer’ or ‘messer adjacent’, since they are more knife-like in construction than sword-like in their mounting. There is some indication that they may be related to Northern Italian forms of tool/weapon which may have been called Falcastro, and this is an ongoing area of research. In contemporary popular culture and among modern sword makers this style of sword often is named a “bible chopper” after its appearance in the Maciejowski Bible.

Subtype 1d These final versions of the type 1 falchions begin to develop a pronounced point on the tip. This is carried along the top of the spine which allows the blade to be reinforced at this thrusting portion, and still have a thin cutting belly beneath it.

=== Type 2 ===
Subtype 2a Only one blade is represented in this type, often called the ‘reverse edged’ falchion. In use from 1300~1370, these falchions are sharpened along the ‘short’ edge, which features a clipped portion, leading to the reinforced thrusting tip. These are known from two surviving examples, one of which displays asymmetrical cross section, and is ‘slab sided’ showing a chisel edge on the cutting surfaces. Further evidence of archaeological leatherworking in Dordrecht included remnants of scabbards for Type 2a falchions, and based on the geographic origins of manuscript depictions, it has been suggested that Type 2a falchions are mostly a regional style centered on northern France or Burgundian regions, and spreading out only a little to the British Isles, and Western Germany.

=== Type 3 ===
Type 3 blades show variations in having scalloped or cutaway tips on the blades.

Subtype 3a The initial clip point provides a large degree of cutting power at the end of the blade while still allowing for some thrusting ability at the tip.

Subtype 3b The beginning of the transition to more elongation of the tip into a thrusting point Still carrying some deep cross section for cutting power but moving to a more narrow over all cross section with a more specialized tip than the earlier 3a design.

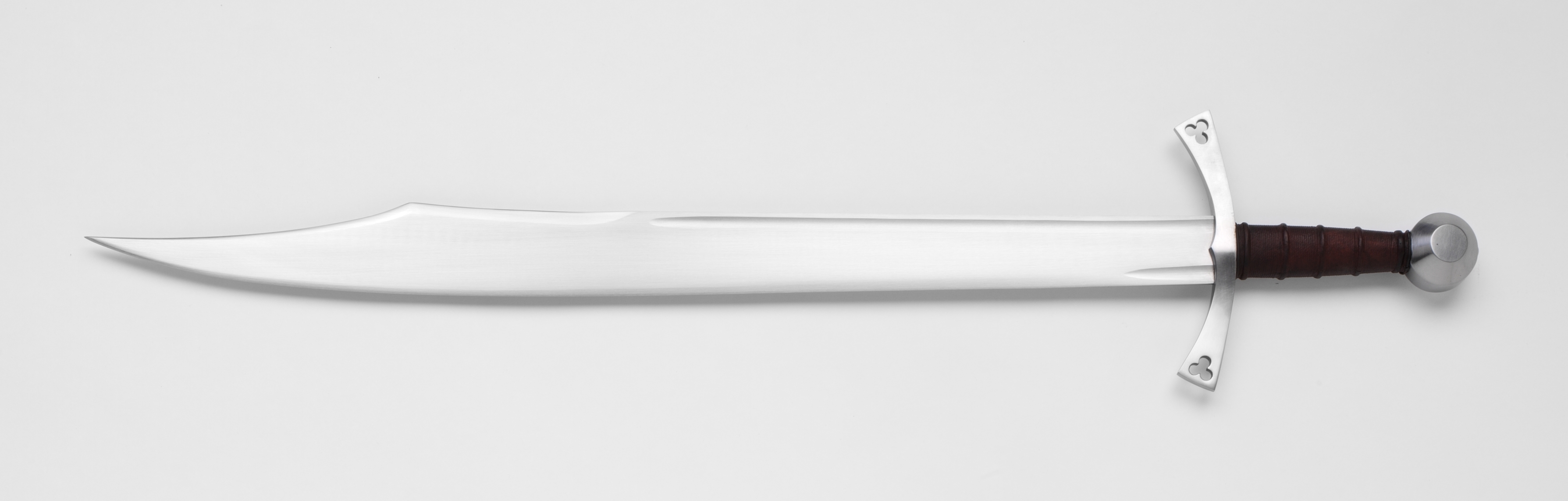
Modern 3c Falchion from Albion (Vassal)

Subtype 3c An even more extreme variation on the clip back with the elongated tip, while maintaining mass for the cut. This type along with the 3b represents the last of the transition forms moving through the 13th and 14th centuries.

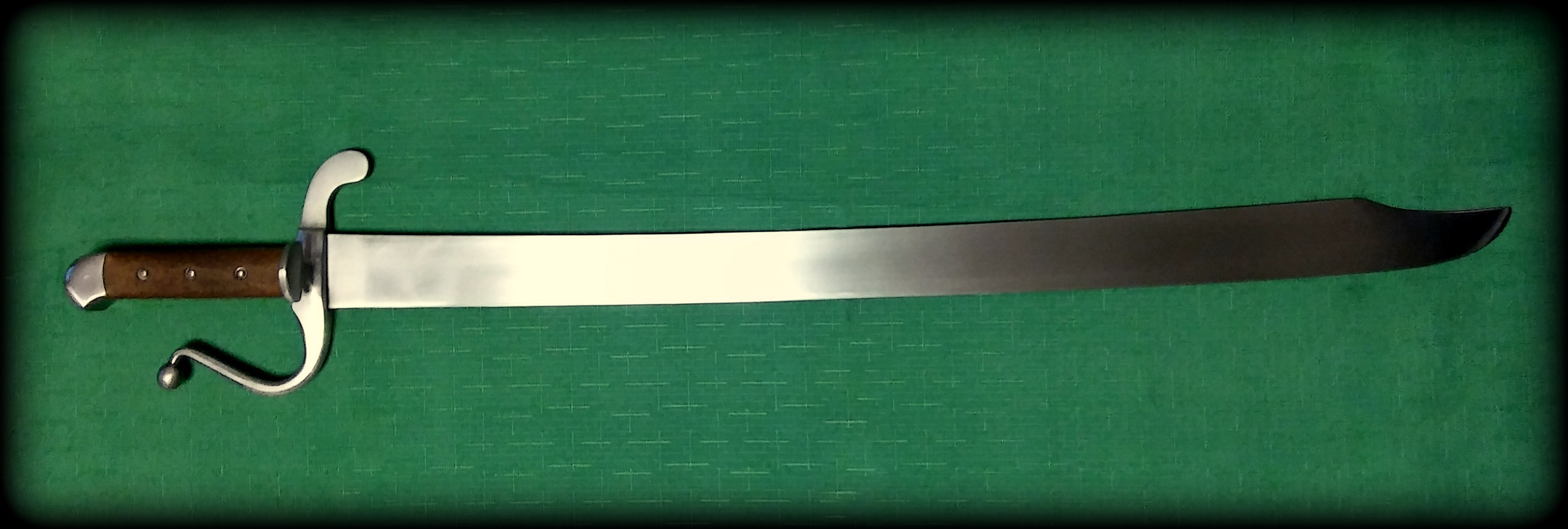
Modern Type 3d on a Messer hilt

Subtype 3d This is a much shorter type of clip point, which became popular in the 15th century. Sometimes referred to as a ‘cat’s claw’ this type is a more gracile form than the preceding designs, which tended to either flare or remain wider across the length of the blade. This blade type became popular on messer in particular.

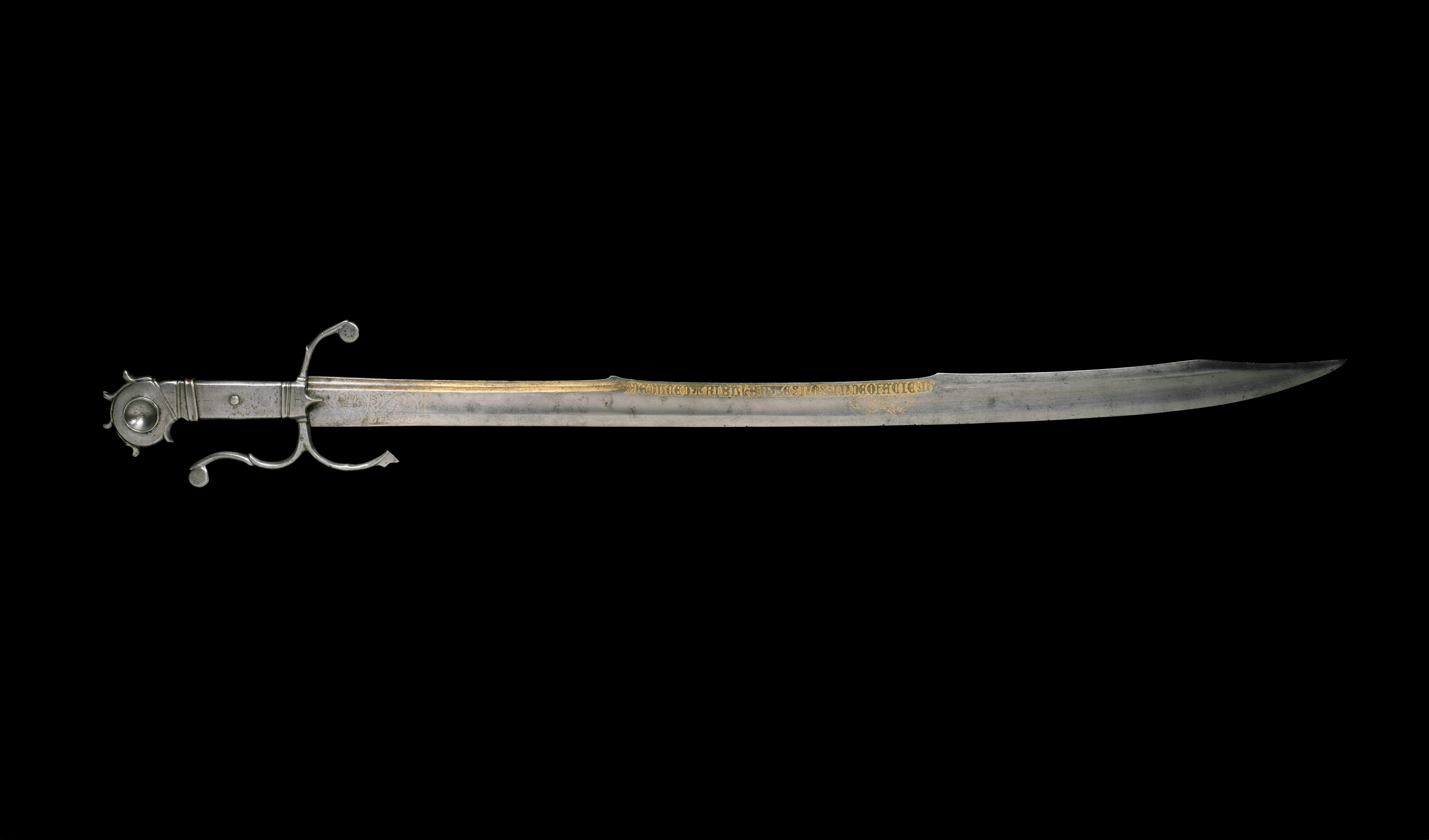
Type 3e Italian Falchion from 1490

Subtype 3e This type is characterized by having multiple scallops along the back edge (most commonly 2, but occasionally 3). This is a more rare and ostentatious type of blade which was seen more often on messer than on falchions. There are few surviving examples of this type.

=== Type 4 ===
The blades associated with type 4 more often are seen in eastern Europe, and may blur the line between messer, falchion, and sabre.

Subtype 4a These blades have a spine which shows a marked ‘step’ down followed by a later ‘step’ up close to the foible. While perhaps more common in eastern Europe, these can be seen in blades from German, Italian, and Swiss lands as well, such as the famous Swiss sabre.

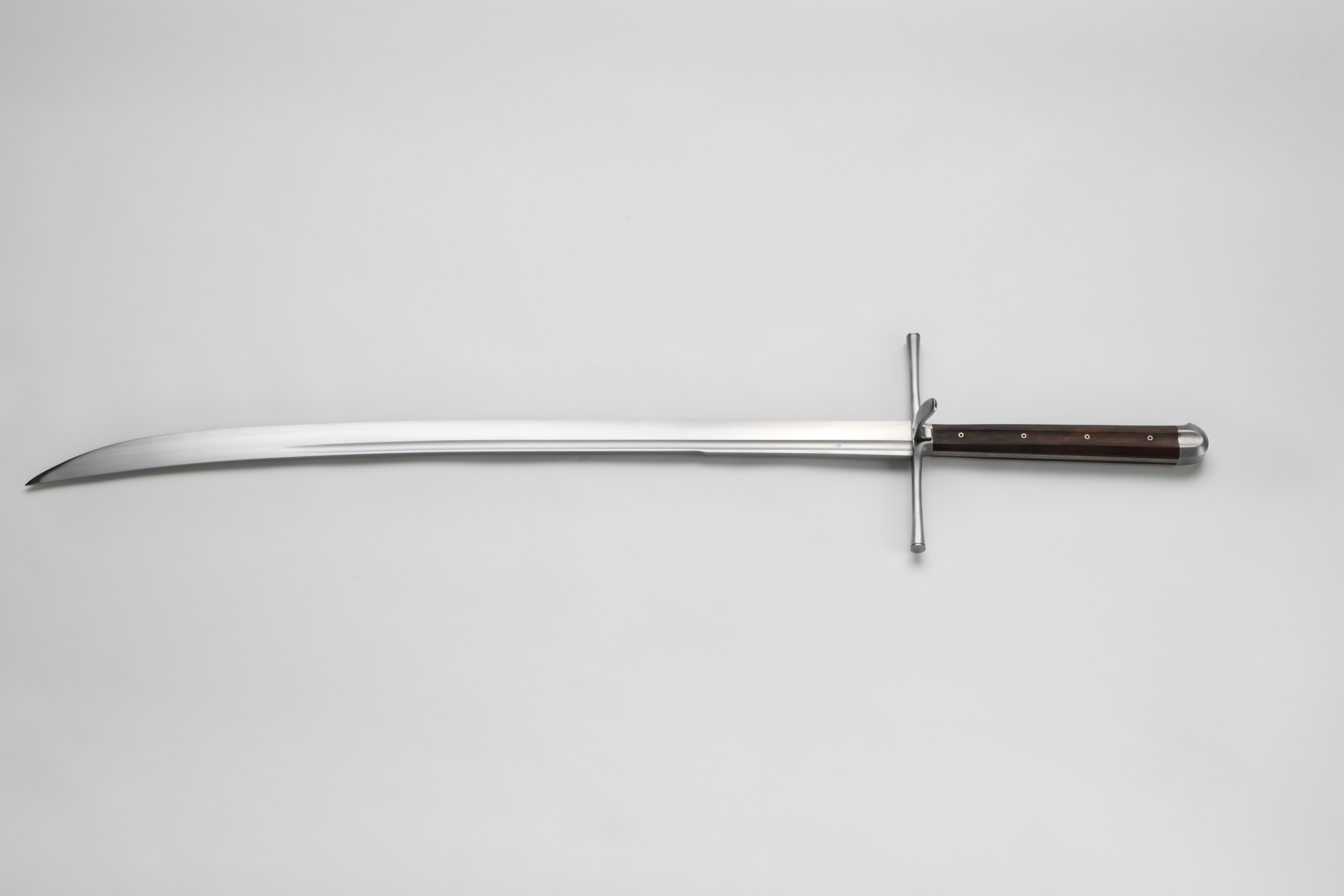
Type 4b Reproduction Kriegsmesser by Albion (Knecht)

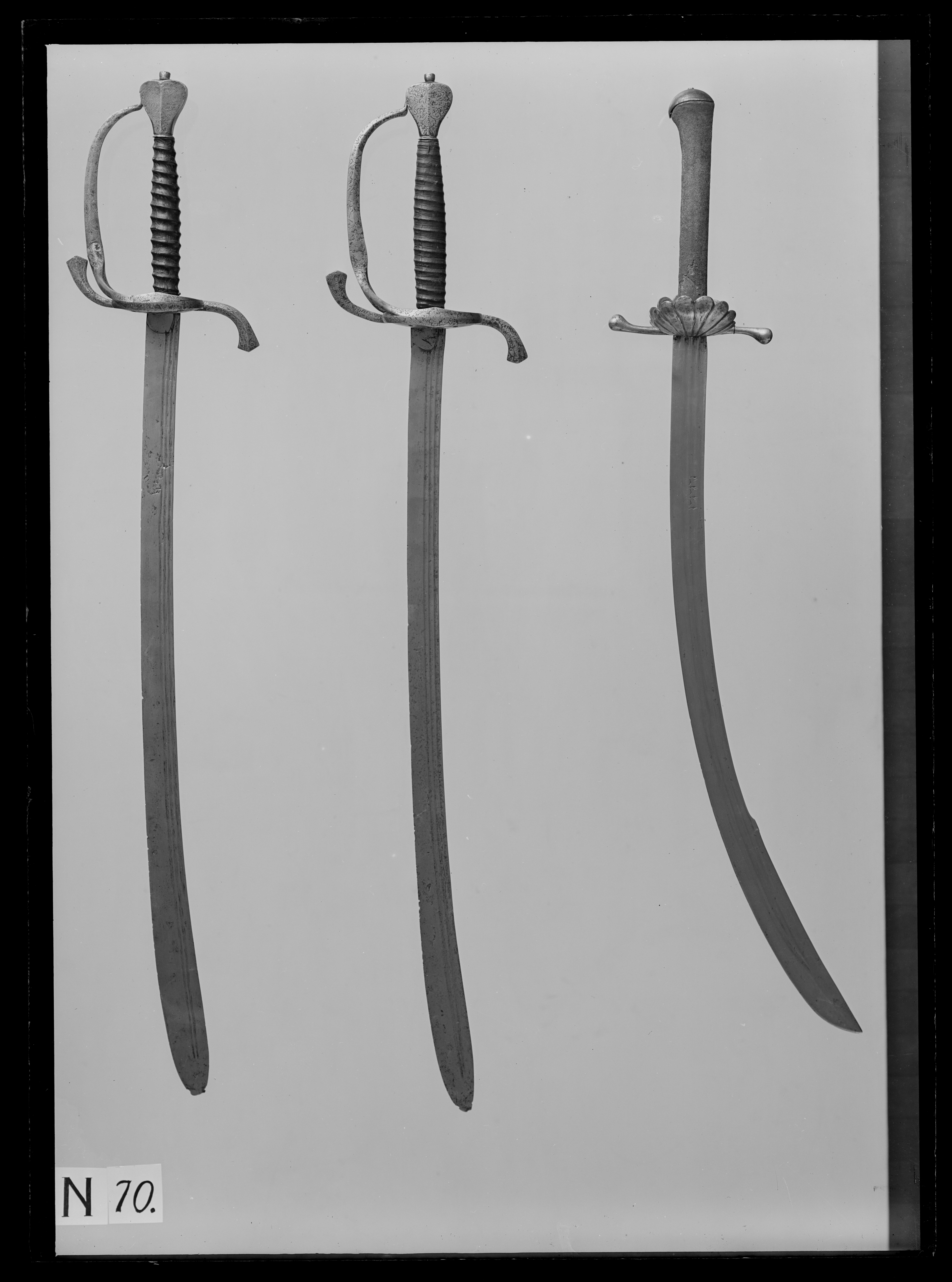
Type 4c (far right) 16th century blade: Eastern Europe

Subtype 4b This type only has a step downward in the spine, lacking any additional step up.

Subtype 4c These blades have only a step up, or raised portion in the latter part of the blade. This is often referred to as a ‘yelman’ after the name for this feature on Ottoman Turkish swords. While this false edge may originally have stemmed from contact with Turkish designs, the amount of European production vs cross pollination makes it difficult to attribute all instances as having a single point of origin.

Subtype 4d These blades have a notable step up and step down prior to the foible of the sword. This feature usually is unsharpened and may be near the ‘sweet spot’ or the area around which the sword strikes hardest.

=== Type 5 ===
This group are characterized by relatively symmetrical profiles, typically featuring little to no curvature over their length. As such, Elmslie has noted that while often easily spotted on messers with asymmetric hilts, the single-edged swords with more symmetrical hilts are often unnoticed in museums, and more research is needed to identify this blade type, "hiding in plain sight".

As this family is often straighter and narrower than other types, they are not only rarely referred to as ‘falchions’ and are more commonly referred to as ‘single edged swords’, or sometimes "Early Backswords"

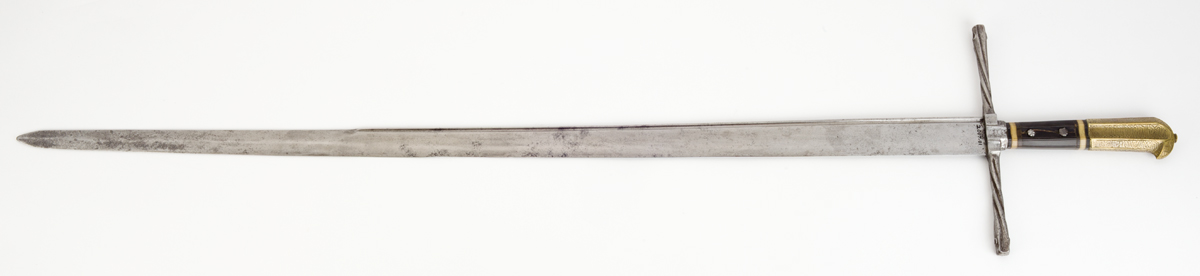
Type 5b Hunting Messer by workshop of Hans Sumersperger)

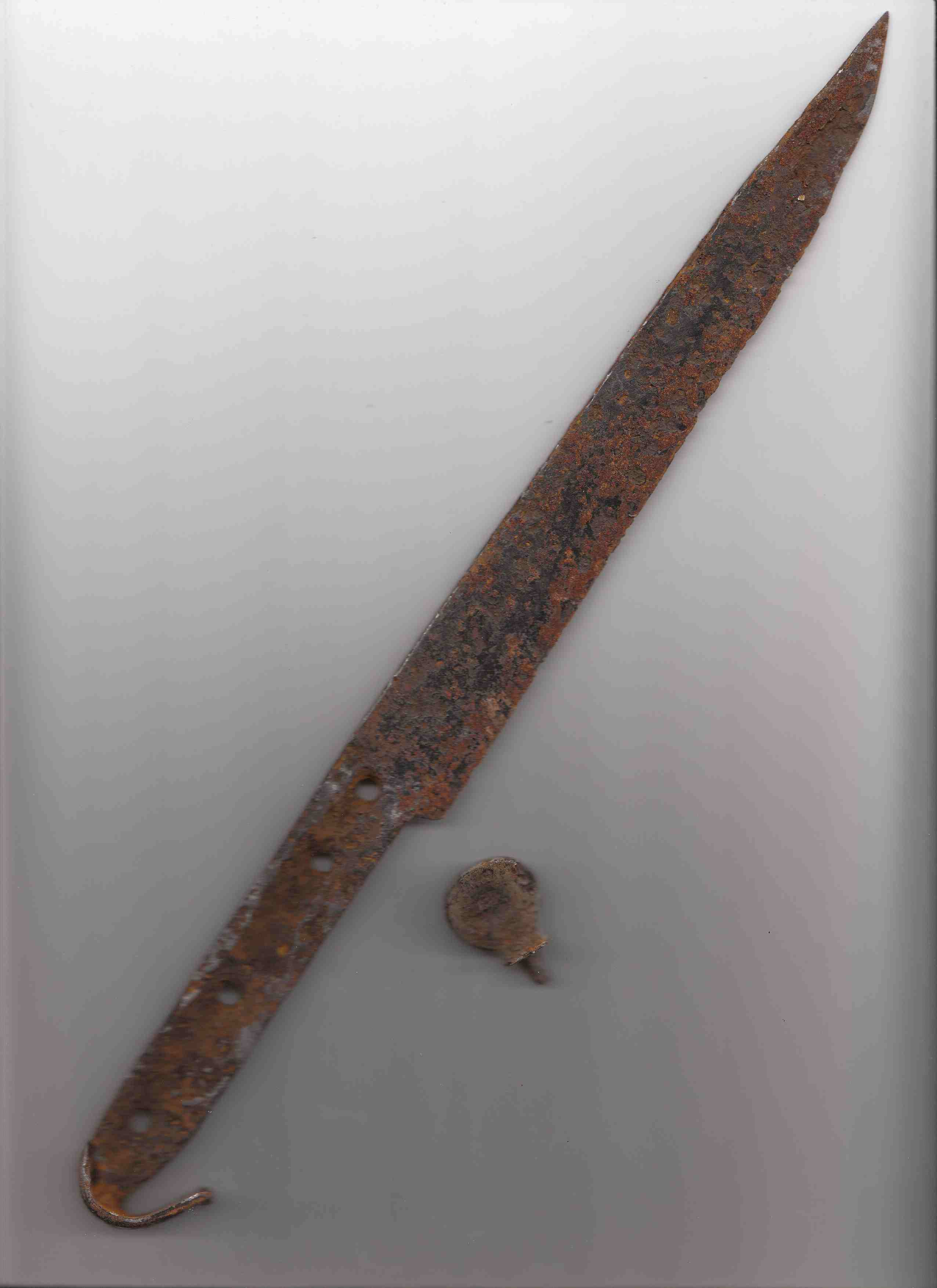
Type 5e Bauernwehr)

Subtype 5a These swords are typically parallel bladed with a tip which curves upwards to meet the spine.

Subtype 5b These swords while largely parallel bladed, end in a spearpoint

Subtype 5c This sword type will have a tapering edge which gradually comes up to meet the spine, which usually intersects just past the centerpoint of the sword (if drawn along the plane of the hilt).

Subtype 5d These types are more commonly found from the Slovenian region. These are more of a type of ‘knife’ than the previous sword sized blades. This type is characterized by being bellied, having curvature on both the spine and the edge of the blade. Much like the larger ‘messer’ style blades, these types are paired with hilts which have a ‘nagel’ or nail, which serves to protect the back of the hand, distinguishing them from simple large household/utility knives.

Subtype 5e This type of large knife unlike the previous type is of a ‘broke-back’ style, showing a large negative curve in the spine of the blade. It shares the same characteristics and of having messer-like hilts.
