= Terciado =

Sword

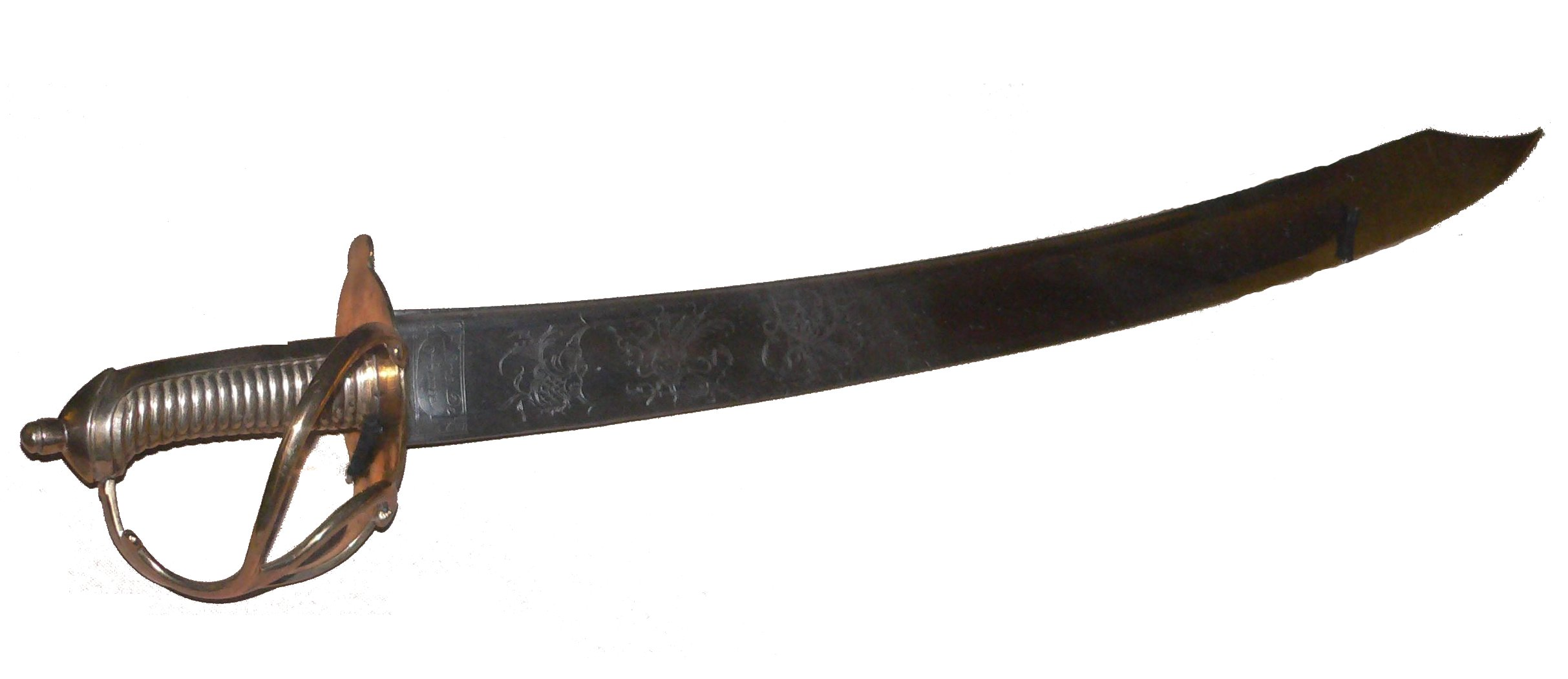
Cutlass or terciado.

Terciado was an Iberian name for a variety of swords or sabres from the Low Middle Ages to the Renaissance, characterized by short, one-edged blades which were described as lacking a third of a usual blade's length (hence terciado, meaning lacking a third). It was generally considered either related or applied to a cutlass, although it was sometimes applied to a falchion too.

== History ==
It was especially used as a naval weapon during the Age of Sail. Antonio Pigafetta identified as a terciado the swords wielded by the natives during the Battle of Mactan, comparing it to a greater sized scimitar.

== See also ==
- Cutlass
