= Jan Petersen (historian) =

Norwegian archaeologist (1887–1967)

Jan Greve Thaulow Petersen
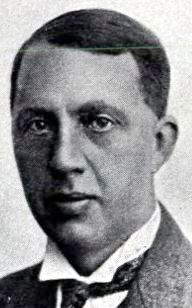
- Jan Greve Thaulow Petersen
- Born: October 20, 1887; Trondheim, Norway
- Died: March 3, 1967 (aged 79); Stavanger, Norway
- Education: University of Oslo
- Scientific career
- Fields: Archaeology
- Workplaces: Stavanger Museum

Jan Greve Thaulow Petersen (October 20, 1887 - March 3, 1967) was a Norwegian archaeologist.

== Biography ==
He was the son of Hans Henrik Petersen (1827–1906) and Elisabeth Cæcilie Thaulow (1845–1901). His father was the principal of Trondheim Cathedral School. Petersen became a cand. philol. in history in 1914 at the University of Oslo and the following year was employed as a curator at the University's Antiquities Collection. Petersen received a dr.philos. in archeology during 1919. Petersen was director of the Stavanger Museum from 1923 to 1958.

During this period he worked with excavation and publication of Iron Age farms in southwestern Norway. He also worked with architect Gerhard Fischer (1890-1977) in the preservation and restoration of the medieval monastery Utstein Abbey.

He was notable for writing De Norske Vikingsverd ("The Norwegian Viking Swords") in 1919. This book was the "standard and authoritative work" on Norse sword typology and "remains an invaluable guide today."

The Oakeshott typology by British historian and illustrator Ewart Oakeshott (1916–2002) was based on Petersen's work.

== Personal life ==
In 1928, he was elected to the Norwegian Academy of Sciences. In 1917, he married Gerda Holtermann (1892–1985). Their daughter Liv Petersen (1922–81) married the political scientist Knut Dahl Jacobsen (1925–1999).

== Selected works ==
- De Norske Vikingesverd (1919)
- Vikingetidens smykker (1928)
- Gamle gårdsanlegg i Rogaland (2 volumes, 1934–1936)
- Vikingetidens redskaper (1951)
