= Chappes =

Chappes may refer to the following places in France:

- Chappes, Allier, a commune in the department of Allier
- Chappes, Ardennes, a commune in the department of Ardennes
- Chappes, Aube, a commune in the department of Aube
- Chappes, Puy-de-Dôme, a commune in the department of Puy-de-Dôme

== See also ==
- Chappe (disambiguation)
- Chaps
