= CHAPS (health organisation) =

UK health organisation partnership

CHAPS (formerly the Community HIV/AIDS Prevention Strategy) is a partnership of UK gay men's health promotion organisations. It is currently funded to operate in England and Wales by the Department of Health and is administered by Terrence Higgins Trust.

The partnership is primarily concerned with producing sexual health promotion campaigns, information booklets and web resources for use by homosexually active men and support material on sexual health topics for use by health professionals.

Prostate Cancer Screening is Offered in Chaps.

== The partnership ==
There are varying levels of involvement for organisations in the partnership, the main two being 'partnership' and 'associate partnership'.

Partners (in alphabetical order)

- GMFA (formerly Gay Men Fighting AIDS), London
- LGBT Foundation (formerly Lesbian and Gay Foundation), Manchester
- Sigma Research, London
- Terrence Higgins Trust (London, South, Midlands, West and Wales regional offices only)
- Trade, Leicester
- Yorkshire MESMAC, Leeds

Associate partners

- The Armistead Project, Liverpool
- Centre for HIV and Sexual Health, Sheffield
- The Eddystone Trust, Plymouth
