= Comprehensive Health Assessment Program =

The Comprehensive Health Assessment Program is a clinically successful system for providing comprehensive medical histories for patients with disabilities. The information is stored in one central location, completed by the patient with their carers and practitioners.

The CHAP is currently being used by the Queensland Government as well as other states in Australia. The program was designed at the University of Queensland by Dr. Nick Lennox.
