= Crossguard =

Bar between a sword's blade and handle

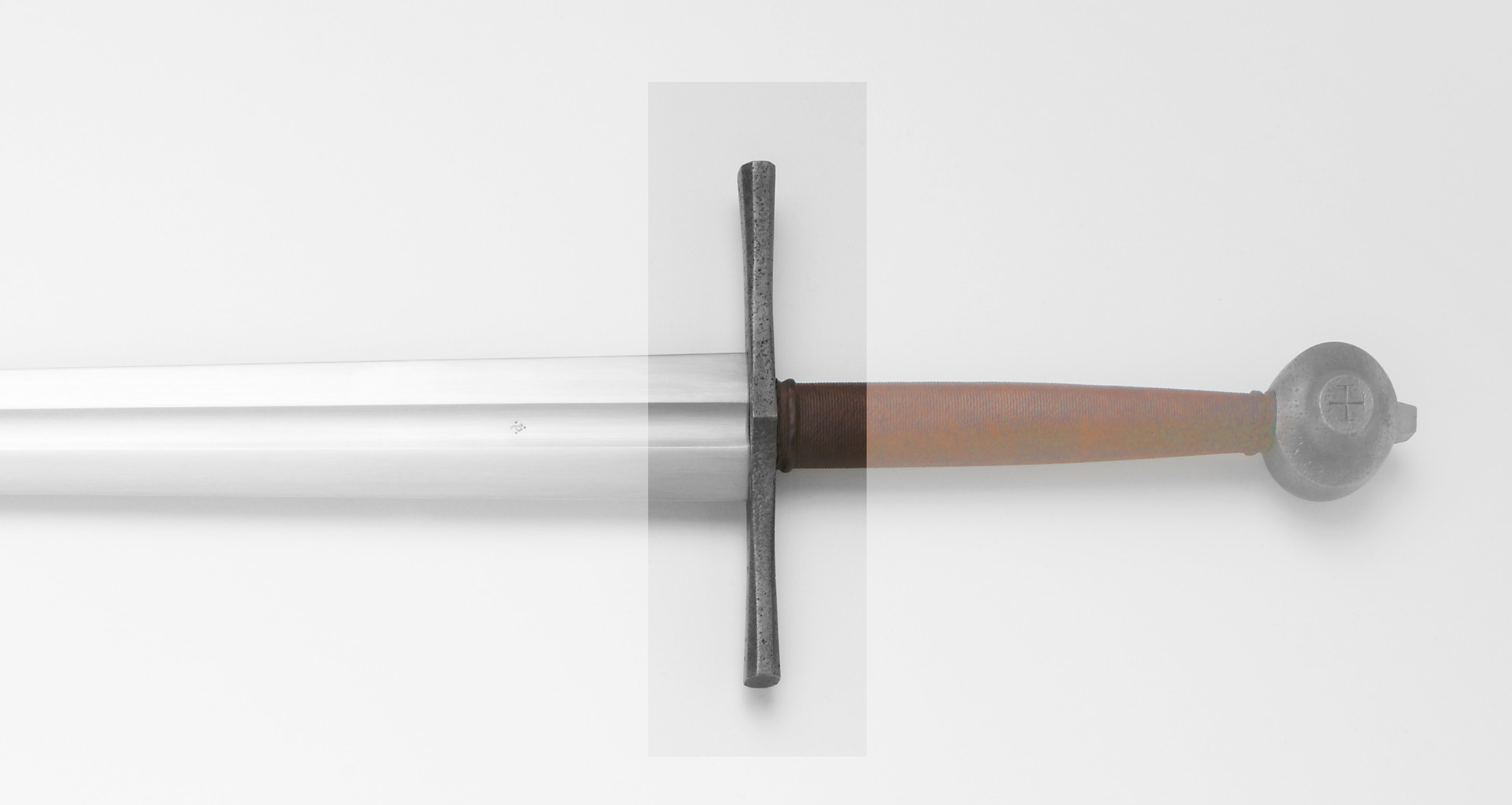
Closeup of a sword, with a box highlighting the crossguard area

A sword (or other bladed weapon)'s crossguard, or cross-guard, is a bar between the blade and hilt (typically perpendicular to them) intended to protect the wielder's hand and fingers from opponents' weapons, as well as from sliding onto their own blade. Each of the projecting arms extending to either side is known as a quillon or quillion. These may be straight, curved, or otherwise shaped depending on the style of the weapon, and in some designs they may also be used to catch, bind, or control an opponent's blade.

== History ==
The crossguard was developed in the European sword around the 10th century for the protection of the wielder's hand.The earliest forms may have developed from late Roman and Migration Period swords such as the spatha, though the precise origins remain uncertain. There are many examples of crossguards on Sasanian Persian Swords beginning from the early 3rd century. There are examples of swords with developed guards in Sasanian Persia beginning from the early 3rd century, though these differ in form from the later crossguards of medieval European swords. Crossguards were not only used to counter enemy attacks, but also to improve grip. They were later seen in late Viking swords. Crossguards became a standard feature of the Norman sword of the 11th century, and remained characteristic of the knightly arming sword throughout the high and late medieval period. Early crossguards were straight metal bars, sometimes tapering towards the outer ends. While this simple type was never discontinued, more elaborate forms developed alongside it in the course of the Middle Ages. The crossguard could be waisted or bent in the 12th and 13th century.

Beginning in the 13th or 14th century, swords were almost universally fitted with a so-called chappe or rain-guard, a piece of leather fitted to the crossguard. The purpose of this leather is not entirely clear, but it seems to have originated as a part of the scabbard, functioning as a lid when the sword was in the scabbard.

In the 14th to 15th century, many more elaborate forms were tried. A feature of such late medieval forms is the cusp or écusson, a protrusion of the crossguard in the center where it is fitted on the blade. Also from the 14th century, the leather chappe is sometimes replaced with a metal sheet. An early example of this is a sword dated to c. 1320–40 kept at the Kelvingrove Museum in Glasgow. A later example is the "Monza sword" of Estore Visconti (early 15th century), where the rain-guard is of silver and decorated with a floral motif.

After the end of the Middle Ages, crossguards became more elaborate, forming first quillons and then, through the addition of guard branches, the basket hilt, which offered more protection to the unarmored hand.

In Europe, namely the area under the strong influence of the Roman Catholic Church and to a lesser degree the Eastern Orthodox Church, the shape of the crossguard bore certain religious significance. It has been theorized that the rise of the crossguard in the classic cruciform style was due to the influence of Christianity. It so happens to parallel the rising of Church power at the advent of the knightly cruciform sword as well as the rapid decline of the cruciform style directly following the Protestant Reformation.

== Types ==
Ewart Oakeshott in chapter 4 of his The Sword in the Age of Chivalry (1964) classifies medieval cross-guards into twelve types:

1. a plain horizontal bar, tapering towards the end. This is the basic shape found from the late Viking era through the 17th century.
2. waisted type, popular in the 15th century.
3. a relatively short bar with a rectangular cross-section. Popular during 1150–1250 and again during 1380–1430.
4. the terminals of the bar are bent towards the blade.
5. "bow tie" style with widened and flattened terminals.
6. a curved or bent variant of type 5.
7. the bar has a flat cross-section and is bent towards the blade; popular in the 14th century.
8. bent terminals as in style 4, but a more elaborate form with a hexagonal cross-section of the part fitted around the tang and a pronounced écusson, popular in the late medieval period.
9. an elaborate late medieval type with the bar bent towards the blade and a flat diamond- or V-shaped cross-section and a pronounced écusson.
10. the arms of the bar taper towards the hilt rather than away from it; mostly also with a pronounced écusson.
11. knobbed terminals, with round or rectangular cross-section, popular during the 15th to 16th centuries
12. the bar curves strongly in the horizontal plane, forming an S-shape; this type dates to the end of the medieval period and is transitional to the early modern quillon types.

The medieval dagger in the 14th and 15th century also adopted a variant with quillons styled after the hilt of a sword. Quillon-daggers remained popular in the 16th century after the sword type it resembled had fallen out of use.

== See also ==
- Japanese sword mountings

== Bibliography ==
- Ewart Oakeshott, The Sword in the Age of Chivalry (1964), chapter 4.
