= CHAP domain =

CHAP
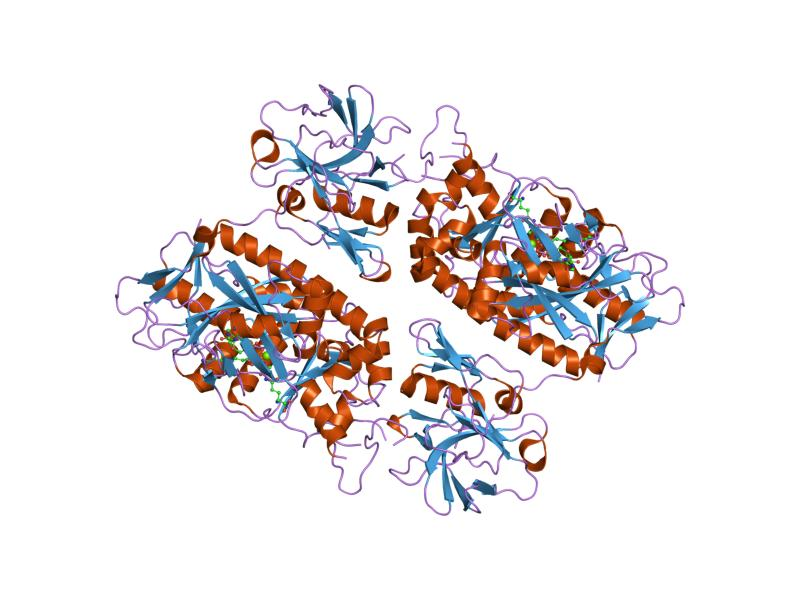
- E. coli Bifunctional glutathionylspermidine synthetase/amidase In complex with Mg2+ and ADP and phosphinate inhibitor.

Identifiers
- Symbol: CHAP
- Pfam: PF05257
- Pfam clan: CL0125
- InterPro: IPR007921
- MEROPS: C51
Available protein structures:
- Pfam: structures / ECOD
- PDB: RCSB PDB; PDBe; PDBj
- PDBsum: structure summary

In molecular biology, the CHAP domain is a region between 110 and 140 amino acids that is found in proteins from bacteria, bacteriophages, archaea and eukaryotes of the family Trypanosomidae. The domain is named after the acronym cysteine, histidine-dependent amidohydrolases/peptidases. Many of these proteins are uncharacterised, but it has been proposed that they may function mainly in peptidoglycan hydrolysis. The CHAP domain is found in a wide range of protein architectures; it is commonly associated with bacterial type SH3 domains and with several families of amidase domains. It has been suggested that CHAP domain containing proteins utilise a catalytic cysteine residue in a nucleophilic-attack mechanism.

The CHAP domain contains two invariant residues, a cysteine and a histidine. These residues form part of the putative active site of CHAP domain containing proteins. Secondary structure predictions show that the CHAP domain belongs to the alpha + beta structural class, with the N-terminal half largely containing predicted alpha helices and the C-terminal half principally composed of predicted beta strands.

Some proteins known to contain a CHAP domain are listed below:

- Bacterial and trypanosomal glutathionylspermidine amidases.
- A variety of bacterial autolysins.
- A Nocardia aerocolonigenes putative esterase.
- Streptococcus pneumoniae choline-binding protein D.
- Methanosarcina mazei protein MM2478, a putative chloride channel.
- Several phage-encoded peptidoglycan hydrolases.
- Cysteine peptidases belonging to MEROPS peptidase family C51 (D-alanyl-glycyl endopeptidase, clan CA).
