= Rain-guard =

Fitting on the crossguard of a sword

Item 4 in this diagram is the rain-guard or chappe, not to be confused with item 10, the chape (note the different spellings)

A rain-guard or chappe is a piece of leather or metal fitted to the crossguard of European swords of the later medieval period. The purpose of the rain-guard is not entirely clear, but it seems to have originated as a part of the scabbard, functioning as a lid when the sword was in the scabbard.

The rain-guard presumably originated in the 13th century but did not become universal until the 14th. Oakeshott (1960) is aware of one preserved specimen of c. 1250. The feature was ubiquitous throughout the 15th century and into the early 16th century, but they seem to fall out of use later in the 16th century.

The main problem in researching the development of this feature is the fact that it is lost to decomposition in all swords recovered archaeologically. A few originals have survived from the late medieval period; otherwise, research is largely based on depictions in paintings or etchings (e.g. well represented in works by Albrecht Dürer) and effigies (a detailed specimen is shown in the effigy of Lionel de Welles, 6th Baron Welles, d. 1461).

It is possible that the function of this feature developed to offer added hand-protection to the wielder, or alternatively into a mostly decorative addition to the cross-guard.

Note that the term "rain-guard" is modern, and reflects the hypothesis that the purpose was to protect the sword in the scabbard (cf. German Regenleder / Dutch Regenleertje "rain-leather"). Oakeshott (1964) uses the term chappe, which may be the historical term, but which is ambiguous as it is merely a French word for "cap" and is also used for the part of the scabbard known in English as chape. But Oakeshott also embraces the "rainguard" hypothesis explicitly in his European weapons and armour: from the Renaissance to the industrial revolution (1980), where he talks about how the metal sheath-covers of early modern swords are derived from the medieval chappe.
