= Hilt =

Handle of a sword or similar weapon

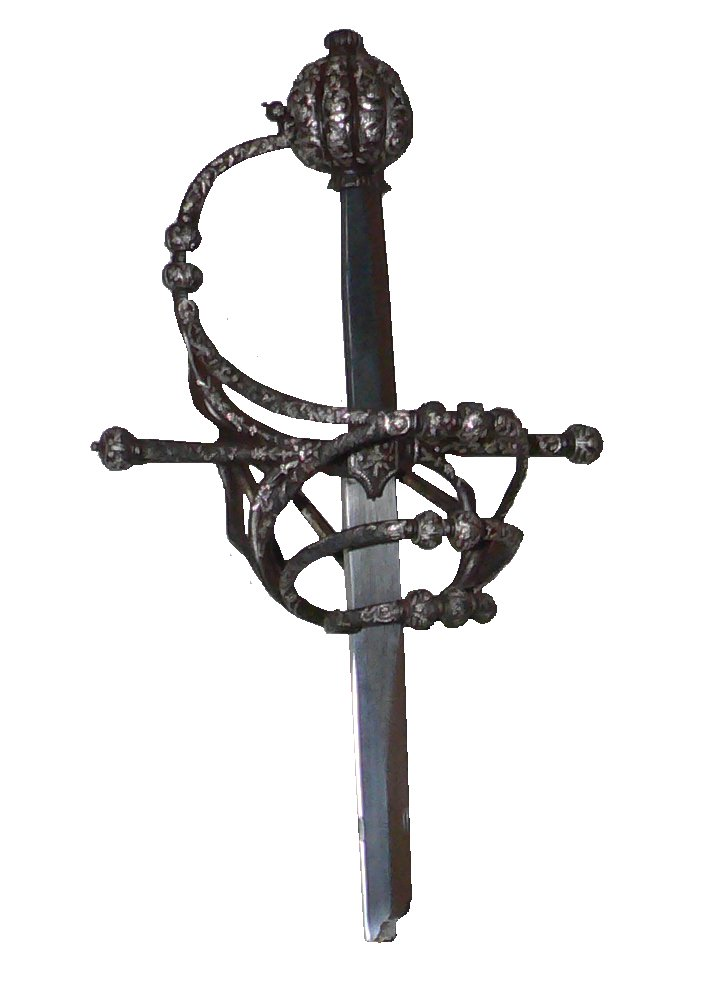
Silver pattern welded rapier guard, from between 1580 and 1600, with reproduction blade

The hilt (rarely called a haft or shaft) is the handle of a knife, dagger, sword, or bayonet, consisting of a guard, grip, and pommel. The guard may contain a crossguard or quillons. A tassel or sword knot may be attached to the guard or pommel.

== Pommel ==
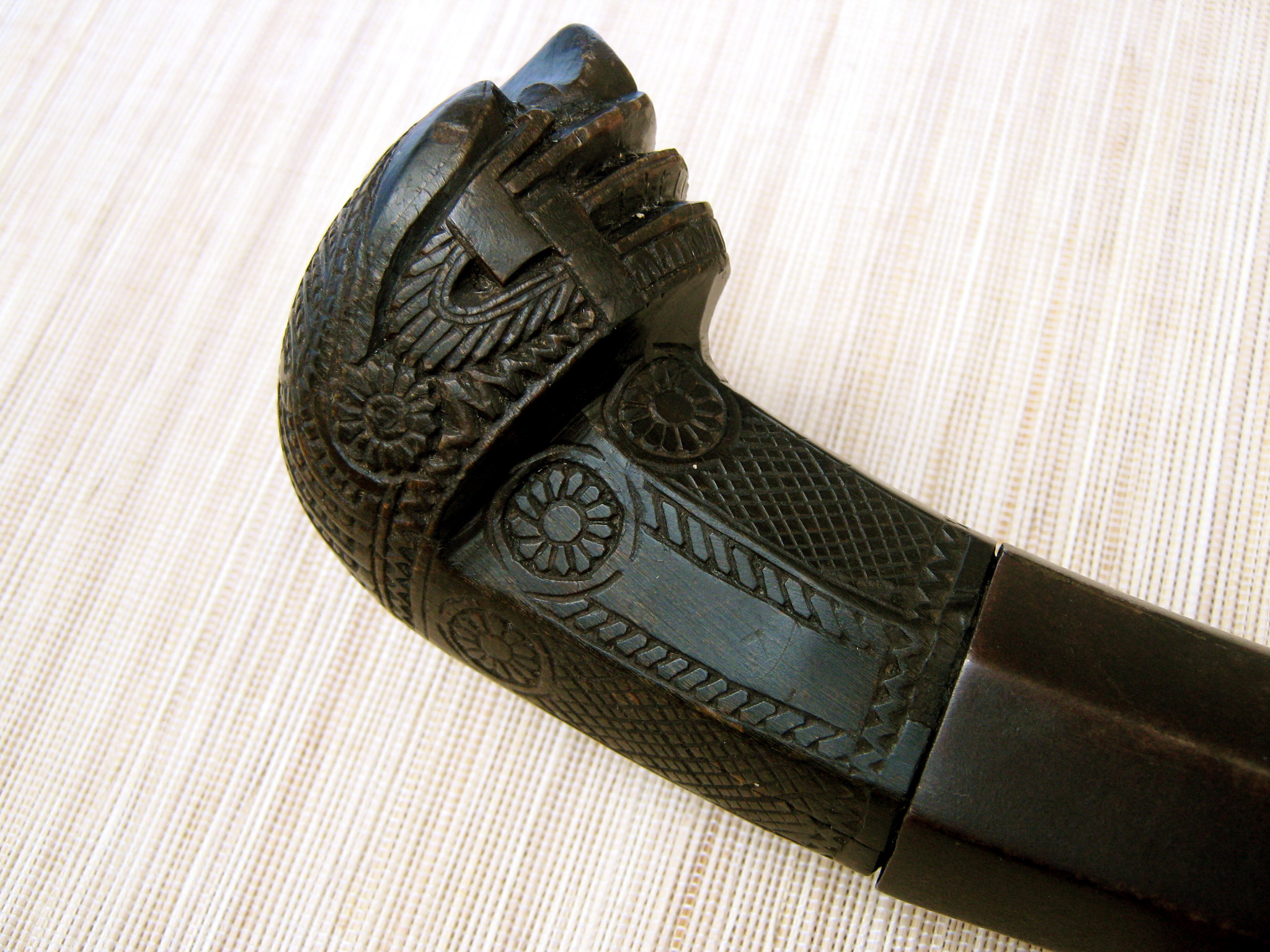
A Visayan tenegre horn hilt from the Philippines, depicting the moon-engulfing sea serpent deity, Bakunawa, a prominent figure in Philippine mythology.

The pommel (from Anglo-Norman pomel "little apple") is an enlarged fitting at the top of the handle. Pommels originally developed to prevent swords from slipping from the hand. From around the 11th century in Europe, they became heavy enough to serve as a counterweight to the blade. This gave swords a point of balance not too far from the hilt, allowing a more fluid fighting-style. Depending on sword design and swordsmanship style, the pommel may also be used to strike the opponent (e.g. using the Mordhau technique).

Pommels have appeared in a wide variety of shapes, including oblate spheroids, crescents, disks, wheels, and animal or bird heads. They are often engraved or inlayed with various designs and occasionally gilt and mounted with jewels. Ewart Oakeshott introduced a system of classification of medieval pommel forms in his The Sword in the Age of Chivalry (1964) to stand alongside his blade-typology. Oakeshott assigned the capital letters A to Z to identify the main pommel-types, with subtypes indicated by numerals:

1. the "Brazil-nut" pommel derived from the classical Viking sword
2. a more rounded and shorter form of A. B1 is the variant with a straight lower edge, known as "mushroom" or "tea-cosy"
3. "cocked-hat" form, derived from the Viking sword
4. a bulkier and slightly later variant of C
5. a variant of D with an angular top
6. a more angular variant of E
7. a plain disk. G1 and G2 are disk pommels ornamented with flower-shaped or shell-like ornaments, respectively, both particular to Italy
8. a disk with the edges chamfered off. One of the most common forms, found throughout the 10th to 15th centuries. H1 is an oval variant
9. a disk with wide chamfered edges, the inner disk being much smaller than in H. I1 is a hexagonal variant
10. as I, but with the chamfered edges deeply hollowed out. J1 is an elaborated form of the classic wheel-pommel
11. a very wide and flat variant of J, popular in the late medieval period
12. a tall type of trefoil shape; rare and probably limited to Spain in the 12th and 13th centuries
13. a late derivation of the multi-lobed Viking pommel type, found frequently on tomb effigies during 1250–1350 in southern Scotland and northern England, but with few surviving examples; see Cawood sword
14. boat-shaped, rare both in art and in surviving specimens
15. a rare type of crescent-shape
16. a rare shield-shaped form, known only from a statue at Nuremberg cathedral
17. flower-shaped pommels, known only from artistic depictions of swords
18. rare spherical pommel, mostly seen in examples from the 9th and 10th centuries
19. a rare type in the form of a cube with the corners cut off
20. the "fig" or "pear" or "scent-stopper" (for its resemblance to the stopper on a bottle of scent) shape, first found in the early-14th century, but seen with any frequency only after 1360, with numerous derived forms well into the 16th century. T1 to T5 are variants of this basic type
21. "key-shaped" type of the later half of the 15th century
22. the "fish-tail" pommel of the 15th century, with variants V1 and V2
23. a "misshapen wheel" shape
26. square shape, with its sub-types used to closely define the area and age, Z1 and Z2b (most common in south-eastern Europe), Z3 ("cat's head", typical for Venetian swords), Z4 (typical for Serbia and Bosnia)

== Grip ==
Parts of a sword

The grip is the handle of the sword. It is usually made of wood or metal and often covered with shagreen (untanned tough leather or shark skin). Shark skin proved to be the most durable in temperate climates but deteriorates in hot climates. Consequently, rubber became popular in the latter half of the 19th century. Many sword types alternatively opt for ray skin, referred to in katana construction as same. Whatever material covers the grip, it is usually both glued on and wrapped with wire in a helix.

== Guard ==
The guard is just above the grip. It is a common misconception that the cross-guard protects the wielder's entire hand from the opposing sword; only with the abandonment of the shield and then the armoured gauntlet did a full hand guard become necessary. The crossguard still protected the user from a blade that was deliberately slid down the length of the blade to cut off or injure the hand.

Early swords do not have true guards but simply a form of stop to prevent the hand slipping up the blade when thrusting, as they were invariably used in conjunction with a shield.

From the 11th century, European sword guards took the form of a straight crossbar (later called "quillon") perpendicular to the blade.

Beginning in the 16th century in Europe, guards became more and more elaborate, with additional loops and curved bars or branches to protect the hand. A single curved piece alongside the fingers (roughly parallel with the handle/blade and perpendicular to any crossguards) was referred to as a knuckle-bow.

Ultimately, the bars could be supplemented or replaced with metal plates that could be ornamentally pierced. The term "basket hilt" eventually came into vogue to describe such designs, and there are a variety of basket-hilted swords.

Simultaneously, emphasis upon the thrust attack with rapiers and smallswords revealed a vulnerability to thrusting. By the 17th century, guards were developed that incorporated a solid shield that surrounded the blade out to a diameter of up to two inches or more. Older forms of this guard retained the quillons or a single quillon, but later forms eliminated the quillons, altogether being referred to as a cup-hilt. This latter form is the basis of the guards of modern foils and épées.

== Ricasso ==
The ricasso is a blunt section of blade just above the guard. On developed hilts it is protected by an extension of the guard. On two-handed swords, the ricasso provided a third hand position above the guard, permitting the user's hands to be placed further apart for better leverage while sacrificing the protection of the crossguard.

== Sword knot ==
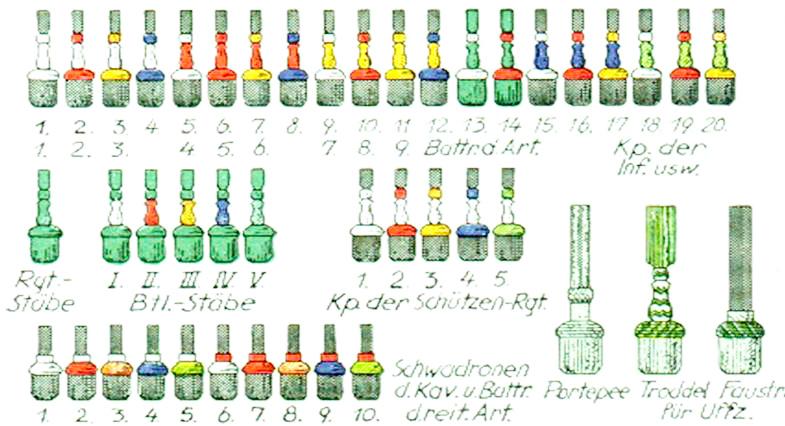
Germany 19th century: Various colours and tassels of sword knots.

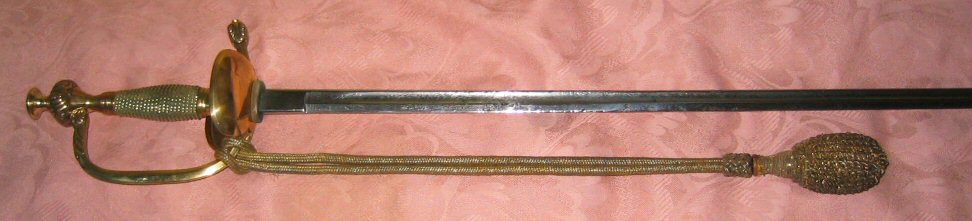
German cavalry officers' Stichdegen (dress sword, literally 'stabbing rapier') with sword knot, or Troddel. When worn, the sword knot is wrapped around the sword guard, or sometimes looped though a slot in the guard.

The sword knot or sword strap, sometimes called a tassel, is a lanyard—usually of leather but sometimes of woven gold or silver bullion, or more often metallic lace—looped around the hand to prevent the sword being lost if it is dropped. Although they have a practical function, sword knots often had a decorative design. For example, the British Army generally adopted a white leather strap with a large acorn knot made out of gold wire for infantry officers at the end of the 19th century. Such acorn forms of tassels were called 'boxed', which was the way of securing the fringe of the tassel along its bottom line such that the strands could not separate and become entangled or lost. Many sword knots were also made of silk with a fine, ornamental alloy gold or silver metal wire woven into it in a specified pattern.

The art and history of tassels are known by its French name, passementerie, or Posamenten as it was called in German. The military output of the artisans called passementiers (ornamental braid, lace, cord, or trimmings makers) is evident in catalogs of various military uniform and regalia makers of centuries past. The broader art form of passementerie, with its divisions of decor, clergy and nobility, upholstery, coaches and livery, and military, is covered in a few books on that subject, none of which are in English.

Indian swords had the tassel attached through an eyelet at the end of the pommel.

Chinese swords, both jian and dao, often have lanyards or tassels attached. As with Western sword knots, these serve both decorative and practical functions, and the manipulation of the tassel is a part of some jian performances.
