= Ewart Oakeshott =

British illustrator and historian (1916–2002)

Ewart Oakeshott

Ronald Ewart Oakeshott (25 May 1916 – 30 September 2002) was a British illustrator, collector, and amateur historian who wrote prodigiously on medieval arms and armour. He was a Fellow of the Society of Antiquaries, a Founder Member of the Arms and Armour Society, and the Founder of the Oakeshott Institute. He created a classification system of the medieval sword, the Oakeshott typology, a systematic organization of medieval weaponry.

== Biography ==
Ronald Ewart Oakeshott was born in 1916. His uncle Jeffery Farnol wrote romance novels and swashbucklers and also had a collection of antique swords, through which the young Oakeshott became interested in swords. After leaving Dulwich College, Oakeshott studied at the Central School of Art in London. He worked at Carlton Studios and at A.E. Johnson Ltd as a commercial artist, while still being interested in collecting arms and armour. During the 1930s and 1940s, antique swords could still be acquired relatively cheaply and Oakeshott began collecting them. Because of the scarcity of information about these he began to research them himself. As a trained artist he illustrated most of his own books and also became a speaker on arms and armour.

Oakeshott served in the Royal Navy from 1940 to 1945 on destroyer escort duty and was relieved from service after contracting TB. He returned to A.E. Johnson, Ltd. and served as its director for fifteen years before leaving in 1960 to become a full-time researcher and writer. In 1964 he was elected a Fellow of the Society of Antiquaries. He co-founded the Arms and Armour Society in 1948, for which he served as President in 1951. That same year, Oakeshott published the article "A Royal Sword in Westminster Abbey" in The Connoisseur on the results of his work on the sword of Henry V in Westminster Abbey. As a result, Oakeshott began to be consulted by museums such as the Fitzwilliam Museum at Cambridge and private collectors.

At his death, Oakeshott bequeathed (in trust for a period of 80 years) his personal collection of more than 75 swords, including many of historical significance, to the Oakeshott Institute of Arms and Armour in Minneapolis, an educational organisation dedicated to youth outreach, and "promoting the interest in ancient arms and armour through hands-on educational experience." The Institute is currently creating an online 3D database of the collection, titled the Historical Sword Documentation Project, providing international access to the ancient weapons, and keeping with Oakeshott's wish that his family's collection stay accessible and of benefit to the public. As of 2018, the project's database had 12 3-D models published, with more being worked on.

=== Personal life ===
In 1963, Oakeshott met the educationist and writer Sybil Marshall (1913–2005). He left his wife for her and they became partners for life and married in 1995, after the death of Oakeshott's first wife, Margaret Roberts. Oakeshott had a son and two daughters from his first marriage.

== Typology ==
Oakeshott's typology of medieval and early renaissance swords is among his most influential and most lasting works. He has been described as the sword's "most distinguished modern commentator". Dr Jan Petersen had previously developed a typology for Viking swords consisting of twenty-six categories. Petersen's typology was simplified by Dr R. E. M. Wheeler in short order to only seven categories (Types I–VII). This simplified typology was then slightly expanded by Oakeshott by the addition of two transitional types into its current nine categories (Types I–IX). From this basis, Oakeshott began work on his own thirteen-category typology of the medieval sword ranging from Type X to Type XXII.

What made Oakeshott's typology unique was that he was one of the first people either within or outside of academia to seriously and systematically consider the shape and function of the blades of European medieval swords as well as the hilt, which had been the primary criterion of previous scholars. His typology traced the functional evolution of European swords over a period of five centuries, starting with the late Iron Age Type X, and took into consideration many factors: the shape of blades in cross section, profile taper, fullering, whether blades were stiff and pointed for thrusting or broad and flexible for cutting, etc. This was a breakthrough. Oakeshott's books also dispelled many popular cliches about Western swords being heavy and clumsy. He listed the weights and measurements of many swords in his collection which have become the basis for further academic work as well as templates for the creation of high quality modern replicas.

== List of published works ==
- The Archaeology of Weapons: Arms and Armour from Prehistory to the Age of Chivalry Boydell Press, 1960. ISBN 0-486-29288-6
- The Sword in the Age of Chivalry Boydell Press, 1964. ISBN 0-85115-715-7
- Records of the Medieval Sword Boydell Press, 1991. ISBN 0-85115-566-9
- European Weapons and Armour: From the Renaissance to the Industrial Revolution Boydell Press, 2000. ISBN 0-85115-789-0
- Sword in Hand Arms & Armor, Inc. 2000. ISBN 0-9714379-0-4
- A Knight and His Weapons Dufour Editions 1964, 1997. ISBN 0-8023-1299-3
- A Knight and His Armor Dufour Editions —, 1999. ISBN 0-8023-1329-9
- A Knight and His Horse Dufour Editions 1962, 1995. ISBN 0-8023-1297-7
- A Knight in Battle Dufour Editions —, 1998. ISBN 0-8023-1322-1
- A Knight and His Castle Dufour Editions 1965, 1996. ISBN 0-8023-1294-2
- Swords of the Viking Age Boydell Press 2002. ISBN 0-8023-1294-2
- The Sword in Anglo-Saxon England Boydell & Brewer 1962. ISBN 0-85115-355-0
- Dark Age Warrior Dufour Editions 1974, 1984. ISBN 0-8023-1273-X

== Further Information ==
In the chapter "The Battle of Arsuf 1191" of his book A Knight in Battle, Oakeshott includes eyewitness accounts by the author of Itinerarium regis ricardi and Boha ed Din.
