= Viking sword =

Viking Age sword
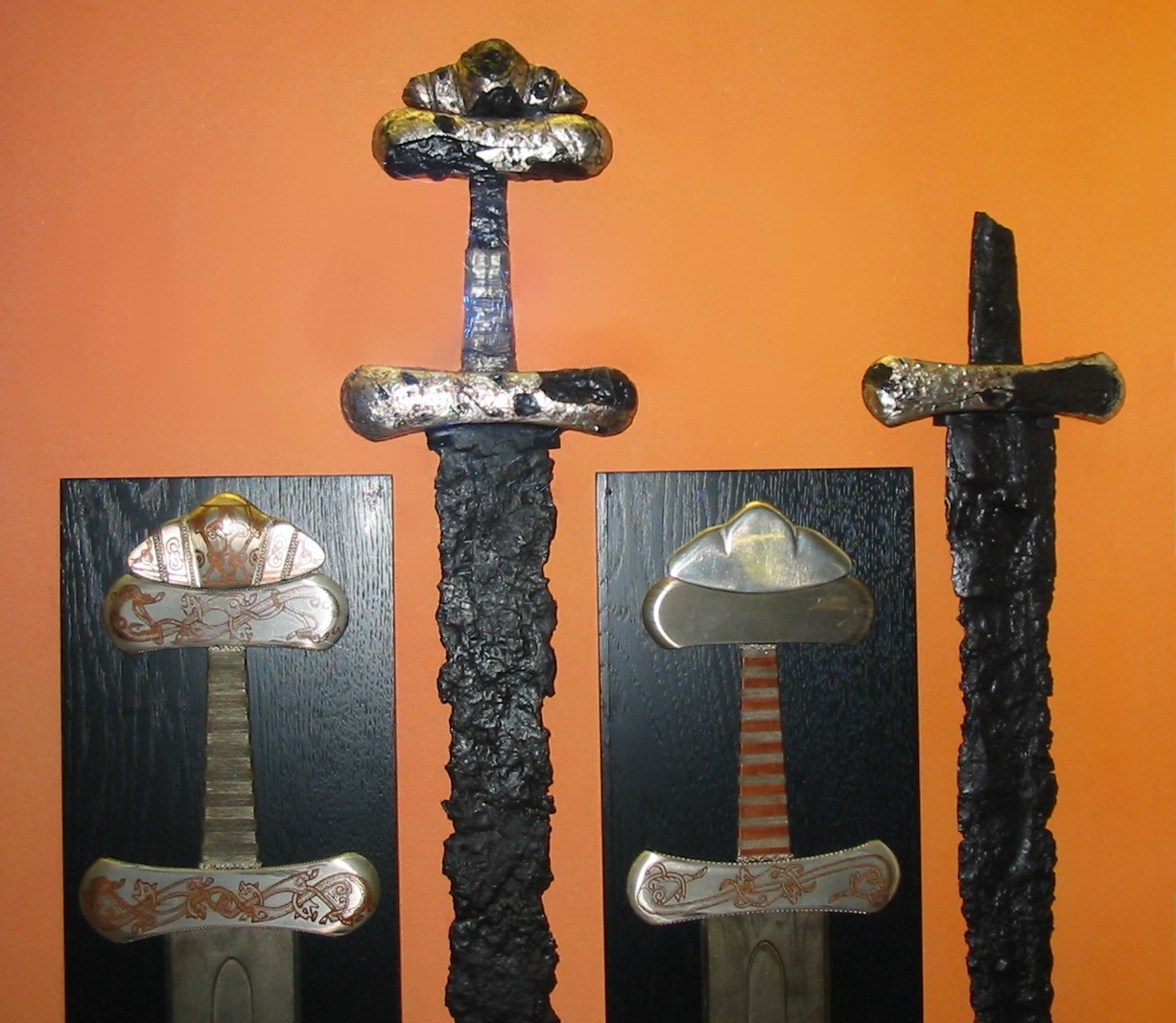
- Two 10th-century sword hilts (Petersen type S) with Jelling style inlay decorations, with reconstructed replicas, on display in Hedeby Viking Museum.
- Type: Sword

Production history
- Produced: 8th to 11th centuries

Specifications
- Mass: Ca. 1.0 to 1.5 kg
- Length: Ca. 84 to 105 cm
- Blade length: Ca. 70 to 90 cm

The Viking Age sword (also Viking sword) or Carolingian sword is the type of sword prevalent in Western and Northern Europe during the Early Middle Ages.

The Viking Age or Carolingian-era sword developed in the 8th century from the Merovingian sword more specifically, the Frankish production of swords in the 6th to 7th century and during the 11th to 12th century in turn gave rise to the knightly sword of the Romanesque period.

== Terminology ==
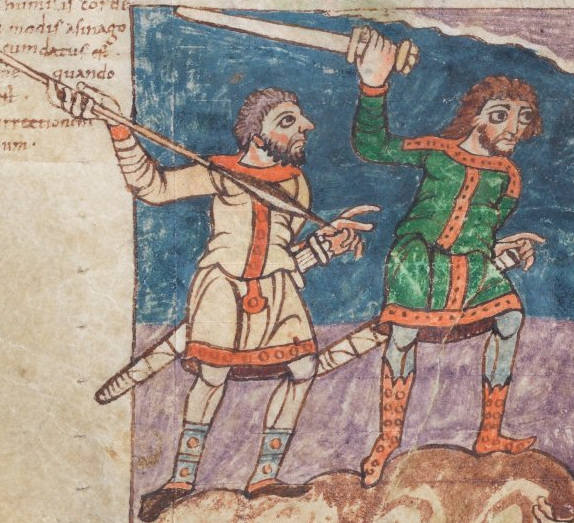
Two men armed with swords, detail of an illustration from the Stuttgart Psalter (fol. 7v), dated c. 830.

Although popularly called "Viking sword", this type of sword was produced in the Frankish Empire during the Carolingian era. The association of the name "Viking" with these swords is due to the disappearance of grave goods in Christian Francia in the 8th century, due to which the bulk of sword blades of Frankish manufacture of this period were found in pagan burials of Viking Age Scandinavia, imported by trade, ransom payment or looting, while continental European finds are mostly limited to stray finds in riverbeds.

Swords of the 8th to 10th centuries are also referred to as "Carolingian swords", while swords of the late Viking Age and the beginning High Middle Ages (late 10th to early 12th centuries) blend into the category of Norman swords or the early development of the knightly sword.

During the Viking age, the Carolingian Empire was central for advanced swordsmithing. The area produced the best quality weapons found in Central and Northern Europe.

== History ==
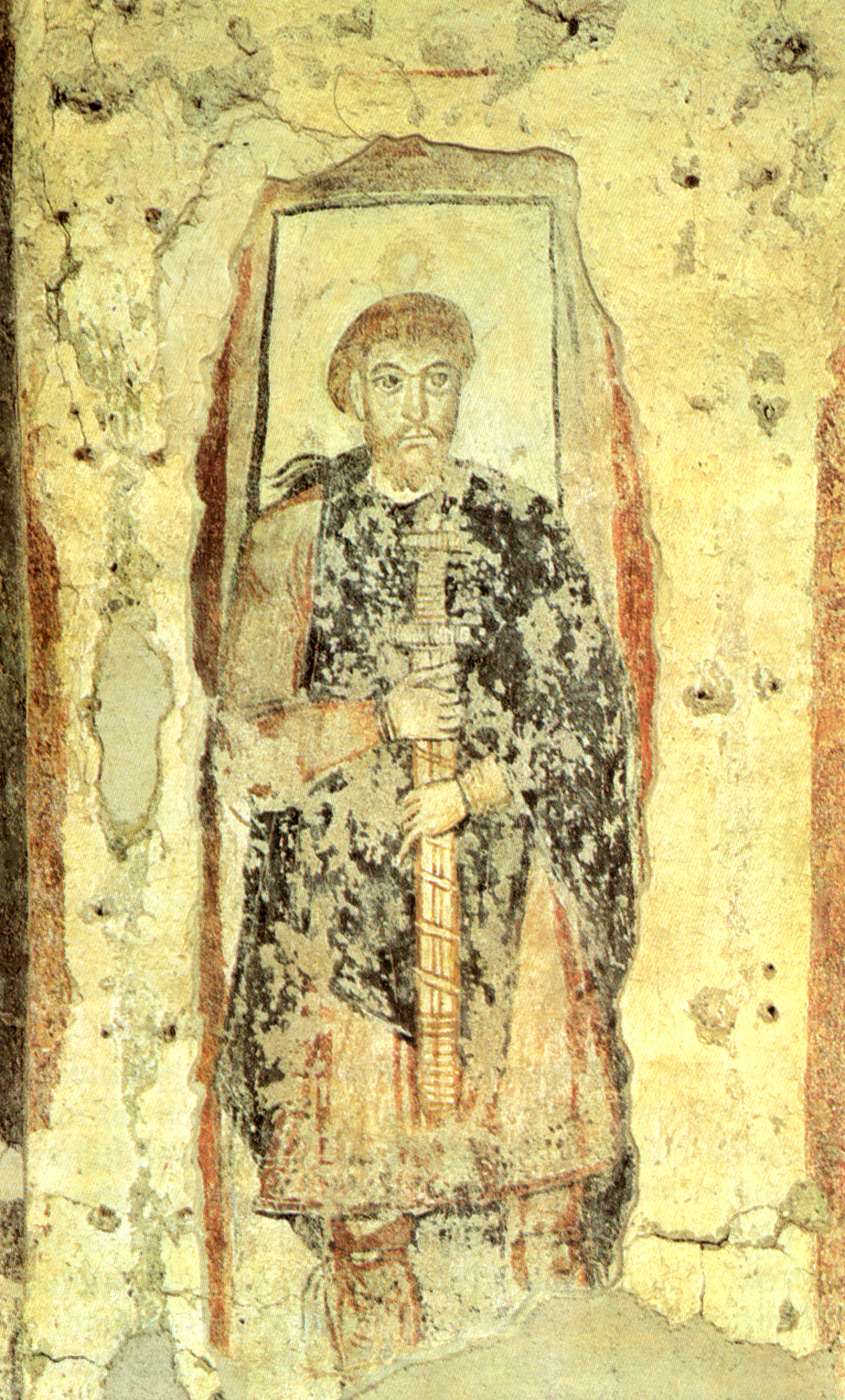
Depiction of a Carolingian sword with scabbard (donor portrait in the St. Benedikt in Mals, South Tyrol, early 9th century)

During the reign of Charlemagne, the price of a sword (a spata) with scabbard was set at seven solidi (totaling about US$1300) (Lex Ribuaria). Swords were still comparatively expensive weapons, although not as exclusive as during the Merovingian period, and in Charlemagne's capitularies, only members of the cavalry, who could afford to own and maintain a warhorse, were required to be equipped with swords. Regino's Chronicle suggests that by the end of the 9th century, the sword was seen as the principal weapon of the cavalry.

There are very few references to Carolingian-era sword production, apart from a reference to emundatores vel politores present in the workshops of the Abbey of Saint Gall. Two men sharpening swords, one using a grindstone the other a file, are shown in the Utrecht Psalter (fol. 35v).

The sword gradually replaced the seax during the late 8th to early 9th century. Because grave goods were no longer deposited in Francia in the 8th century, continental finds are mostly limited to stray finds in riverbeds (where anaerobic conditions favoured the preservation of the steel), and most extant examples of Carolingian swords are from graves from northern or eastern cultures where pagan burial customs were still in effect.

Pattern welding fell out of use in the 9th century, as higher quality steel became available. Better steel also allowed the production of narrower blades, and the swords of the 9th century have more pronounced tapering than their 8th-century predecessors, shifting the point of balance towards the hilt.

== Significance in Norse Culture ==
Swords were highly valued in Norse culture, as they were costly to make and a sign of high status. Owning a sword was a matter of great honour, and persons of status often owned ornately decorated swords with silver accents and inlays. Most Viking warriors owned a sword, as one raid was usually enough to afford a good blade. Freemen, gothi, and jarls owned more ornately decorated swords, while poorer farmers used axes or spears. One sword mentioned in the Laxdæla saga was valued at half a crown, which would correspond to the value of 16 milk-cows. Constructing such weapons was a highly specialized endeavour, and many sword-blades were imported from foreign lands, such as the Rhineland. Swords could take up to a month to forge and were of such high value that they were passed on from generation to generation. Often, the older the sword, the more valuable it became. Local craftsmen often added their own elaborately decorated hilts, and many swords were given names, such as Leg-biter and Gold-hilt.

The significance of swords in Norse culture is further evidenced by the practice of "killing" swords, which involved bending the blade so that it was unusable. This practice may have served both a ritualistic and practical purpose, as Vikings were often buried with their weapons and the "killing" of swords may have deterred grave robbers from disturbing the burial in order to get one of these costly weapons. Archaeological finds of bent and brittle pieces of metal sword remains attest to the regular burial of Vikings with weapons, as well as the habitual "killing" of swords.

== Handle ==
The Frankish swords often had pommels shaped in a series of three or five rounded lobes. This was a native Frankish development which did not exist prior to the 8th century, and the design is frequently represented in the pictorial art of the period, e.g. in the Stuttgart Psalter, Utrecht Psalter, Lothar Gospels and Bern Psychomachia manuscripts, as well as in the wall frescoes in the church in Mals, South Tyrol. Likewise, the custom of inlaid inscriptions in the blades is Frankish innovation dating to the reign of Charlemagne, notably in the Ulfberht group of blades, but continued into the high medieval period and peaking in popularity in the 12th century. While blade inscriptions become more common over the Viking Age, the custom of hilt decorations in precious metals, inherited from the Merovingian sword and widespread during the 8th and 9th centuries, is in decline over the course of the 10th century. Most swords made in the later 10th century in what was now the Holy Roman Empire, while still conforming to the "Viking sword" type morphologically, have plain steel hilts.

== Trade ==
The distribution of Frankish blades throughout Scandinavia and as far east as Volga Bulgaria attest to the considerable importance of Frankish arms exports, even though Carolingian kings attempted to prevent the export of weapons to potential enemies; in 864, Charles the Bald set the death penalty on selling weapons to the Vikings. Ibn Fadlan in the 10th century notes explicitly that the Volga Vikings carried Frankish swords. The Saracens raiding Camargue in 869 demanded 150 swords as ransom for archbishop Rotland of Arles.

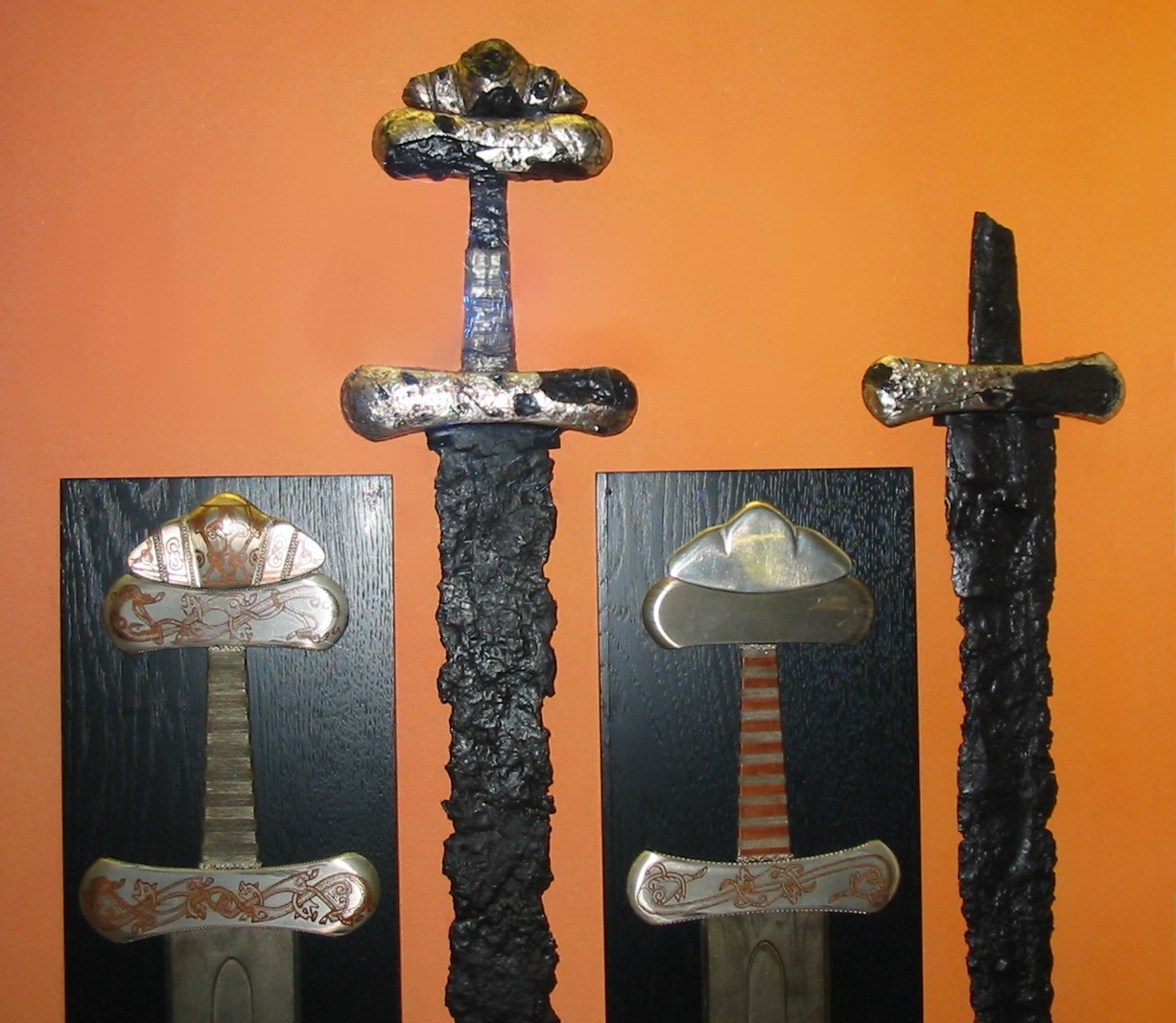
Viking swords

Foreign-made, specifically Frankish, weapons and armour played a special role in Norse society. Norsemen attained them either through trade (an extension of gift-giving in Norse society) or as plunder. Therefore, their possession and display by any individual would signify their station in the social hierarchy and any political allegiances they had. One example of an exchange of weapons between the Franks and the Anglo-Saxons occurred in 795 when Charlemagne exchanged weapons with the Anglo-Saxon king Offa of Mercia.

Scandinavian affinity towards foreign arms and armour during the Viking Age had an eminently practical aspect. Norse weapon designs were obsolete and sources of iron within Scandinavia were of poor quality. Many of the most important Viking weapons were highly ornate—decorated lavishly with gold and silver. Weapons adorned as such served large religious and social functions. These precious metals were not produced in Scandinavia and they too would have been imported. Once in Scandinavia, the precious metals would have been inlaid in the pommels and blades of weapons creating geometric patterns, depictions of animals, and (later) Christian symbols.

During the mid-9th century, there was an influx of these high-quality weapons into Scandinavia, and Frankish arms became the standard for all Vikings. As Ahmad ibn Fadlan observed in his account of his journey to Russia, every Viking carried a "sword of the Frankish type". The Franks attempted to limit the Vikings' use of weapons and armour produced in Francia—fearing that they would eventually face equally armed opponents. Chapter 10 of the Capitulare Bononiense of 811 made it illegal for any clerical functionary to supply swords or armour to non-Frankish individuals. Laws like this were enacted throughout Francia. Ultimately, in 864, King Charles the Bald of West Francia made the practice punishable by death. Some scholars have proposed that such laws proved so effective at stemming the flow of Frankish weapons that they initiated the practice of raiding for which Vikings became notorious.

== Scabbards ==
Carolingian scabbards were made of wood and leather. Scabbard decorations are depicted in several manuscripts (Stuttgart Psalter, Utrecht Psalter, Vivian Bible). A number of miniatures also show the system of suspension of the sword by means of the sword-belt. While the scabbards and belts themselves are almost never preserved, their metal mounts have been found in Scandinavian silver hoards and in Croatian graves. A complete set seems to have included two to three oval or half-oval mounts, one large strap-end, a belt buckle and a trefoil mount. Their arrangement on the sword-belt has been reconstructed by Menghin (1973).

== Morphology ==
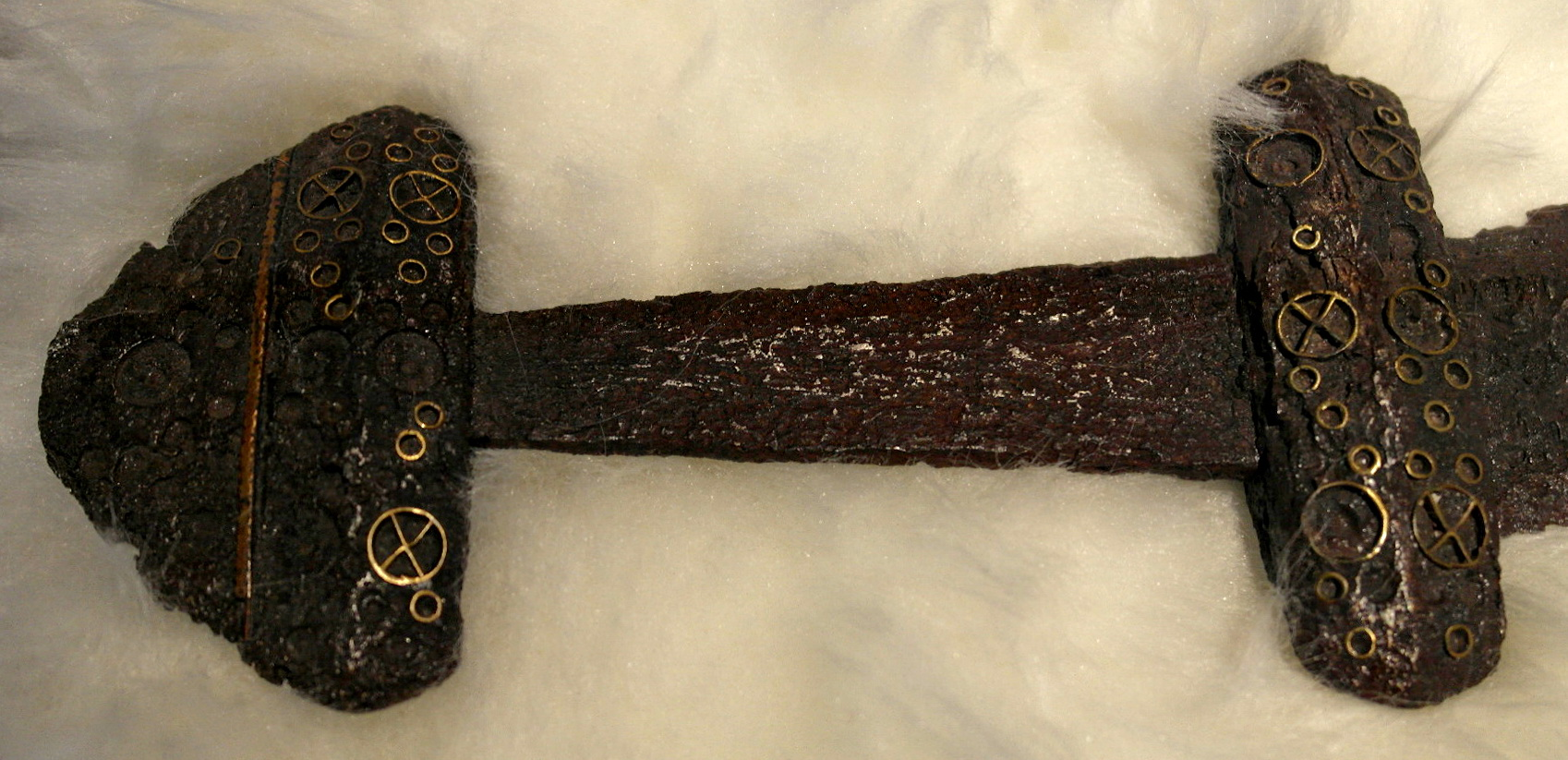
Type B sword hilt with gold "wheel" ornaments, dated c. 750–850, found in the river Meuse near Den Bosch, the Netherlands (Rijksmuseum van Oudheden, Leiden)

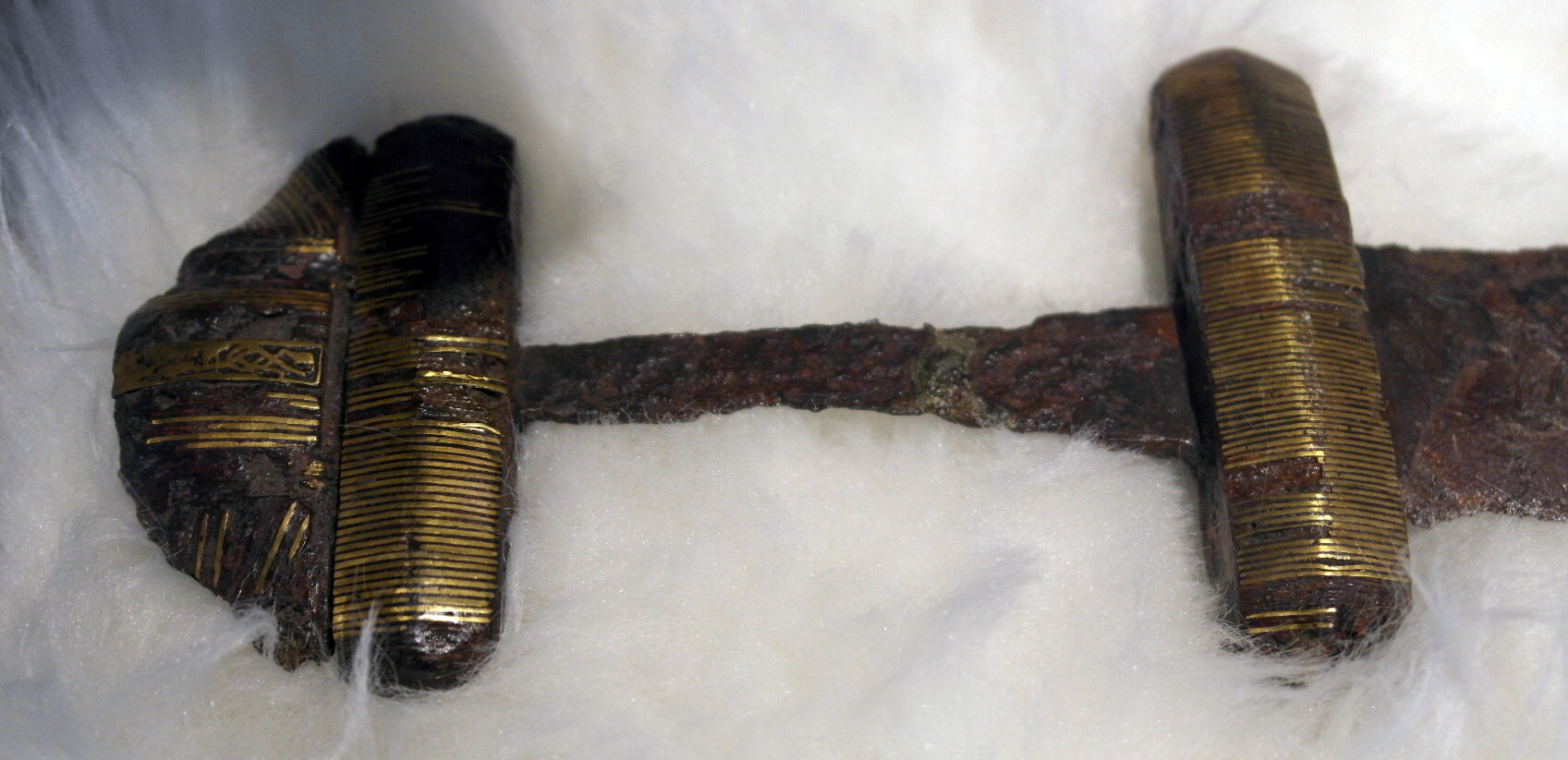
Type D sword hilt with gold wire ornaments, dated c. 750–850, found in the river Meuse near Aalburg, the Netherlands (Rijksmuseum van Oudheden, Leiden)

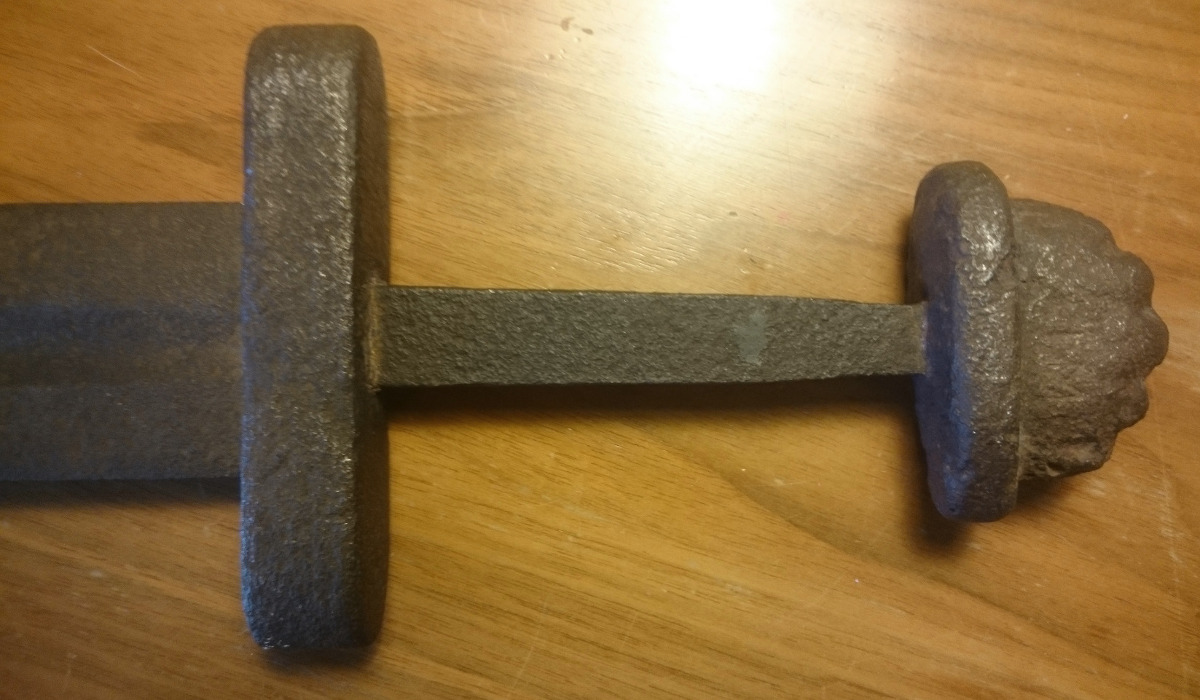
Hilt of a Frankish sword of ca. the 10th century, with characteristically lobed pommel.

The seminal study of the topic is due to Jan Petersen (De Norske Vikingsverd, 1919).

Petersen (1919): Devised the original hilt typology of 26 types that is still widely used across Europe for classifying and dating Viking swords. Based on about 1,700 finds of Viking swords in Norway this typology remains the most commonly used. Petersen's types are identified by capital letters A–Z. Petersen listed a total of 110 specimens found in Norway. Of these, 40 were double-edged, 67 were single-edged and 3 indeterminate.

R. E. M. Wheeler (1927): Created a simplified typology of sword hilts based on finds from Britain, combining Petersen's hilt typology with a blade typology, in nine types labelled I to IX.

Oakeshott (1960): Added two more types to Wheelers typology bridging the gap between the Viking Age and the later mediaeval sword.

Geibig (1991): introduced an additional typology based on blade morphology (types 1–14) and a typology of pommel shapes (types 1–17, with subtypes), focussing on swords of the 8th to 12th centuries found within the boundaries of East Francia (as such including the transitional types between the "Viking" and the "knightly" sword).

Oakeshott (1991): Mainly dealing with sword from the post Viking-age period. He classifies all of the Viking Age swords as his type X.

Jakobsson (1992): has recently published a number of maps detailing the distribution patterns of Petersen's sword hilts across Europe. Jakobsson's conclusions are discussed in Ian Peirce's 'Swords from the Viking Age'.

Peirce (2002): Oakeshott provides an overview of typologies and a discussion on inscribed blades. Jones also provides an overview of hilt and blade classifications, provides a summary of Jakobsson's and Geibig's work and provides an updated typology date range chart. Peirce provides a catalogue of examples, detailing 85 complete or almost complete swords and comparing them to Petersen's discoveries.

== Metallurgy ==
An important aspect in the development of the European sword between the early and high medieval periods is the availability of high-quality steel. Migration period as well as early medieval sword blades were primarily produced by the technique of pattern welding, also known as "false Damascus" steel. Blooms of high-quality steel large enough to produce an entire sword blade were only rarely available in Europe at the time, mostly via import from Central Asia, where a crucible steel industry began to establish itself from c. the 8th century. Higher quality swords made after AD 1000 are increasingly likely to have crucible steel blades. The group of Ulfberht swords includes a wide spectrum of steel and production method. One example from a 10th-century grave in Nemilany, Moravia, has a pattern-welded core with welded-on hardened cutting edges. Another example appears to have been made from high-quality hypoeutectoid steel possibly imported from Central Asia.

== Notable examples ==
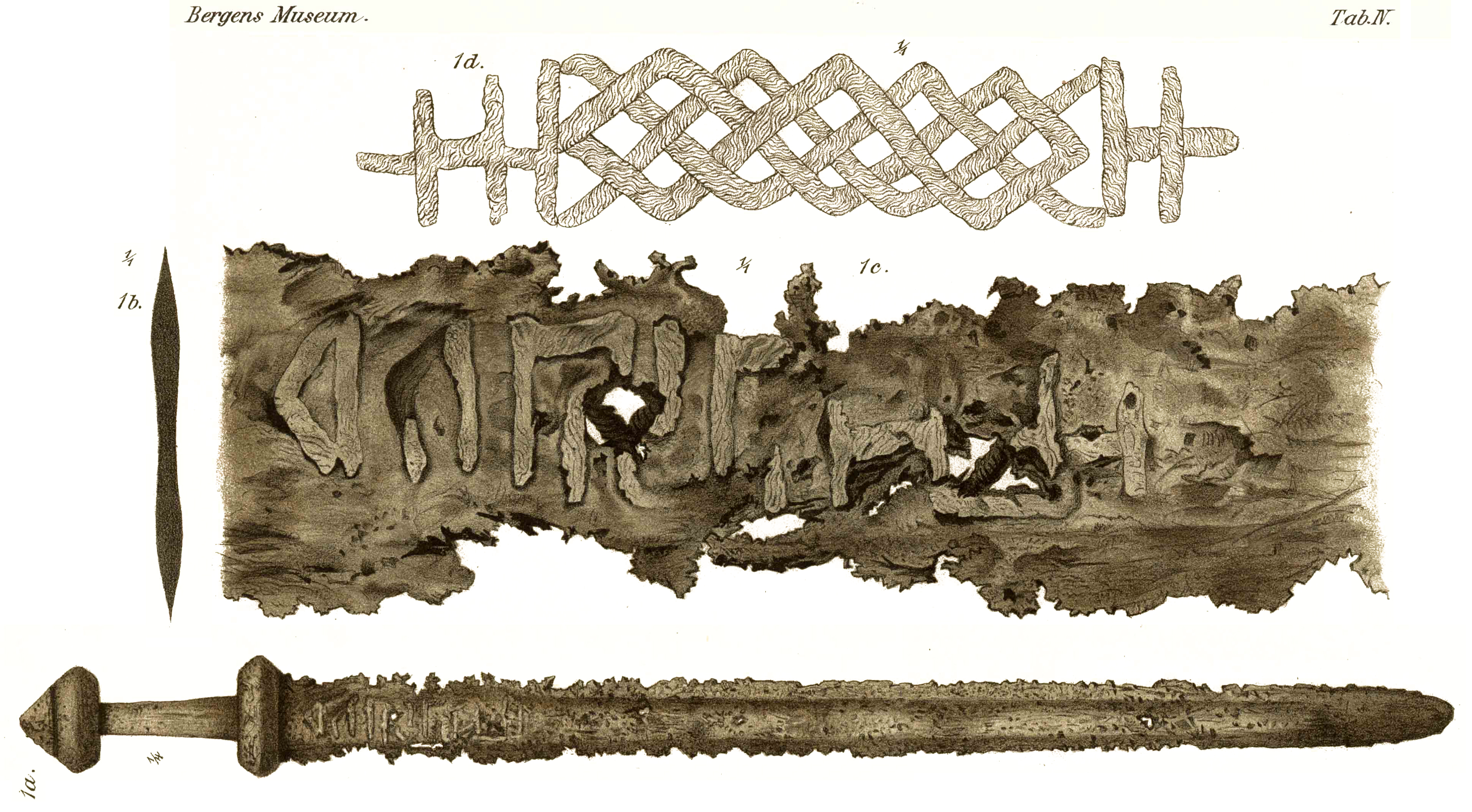
Drawing of the Sæbø sword and its inscription from Petersen (1919).

- The Sæbø sword, a 9th-century type C sword found in 1825 in a barrow at Sæbø in Vikøyri, in Norway's Sogn region. The sword is notable for its blade inscription, which has been interpreted as runic by George Stephens (1867), which would be very exceptional; while Viking Age sword hilts were sometimes incised with runes, inlaid blade inscriptions are, with this possible exception, invariably in the Latin alphabet.
- One of the heaviest and longest extant swords of the Viking Age is dated to the 9th century and was found in Flå, now kept at Museum of Cultural History, Oslo, with a total length of 102.4 cm (40.3 in), a blade length of 86 cm (34 in), and a mass of 1.9 kg (4.2 lb).
- Sword of Saint Stephen: A 10th-century sword of Petersen type T with a walrus-tooth hilt with carved Mammen style ornaments. On display as the coronation sword of Hungarian king Saint Stephen in the Treasury of St. Vitus Cathedral, Prague.
- Lincoln sword (River Witham sword): A sword dated to the 10th century, with a blade of German/Ottonian manufacture classified as a Petersen type L variant (Evison's "Wallingford Bridge" type) and hilt fittings added by an Anglo-Saxon craftsman, was recovered from the River Witham opposite Monks Abbey, Lincoln in 1848. Peirce (1990) makes special mention of this sword as "breath-taking", "one of the most splendid Viking swords extant". The Lincoln sword is also remarkable for being one of only two known bearing the blade inscription Leutfrit (+ LEUTFRIT), the other being a find from Tatarstan (at the time Volga Bulgaria, now kept in the Historical Museum of Kazan). On the reverse side, the blade is inlaid with a double scroll pattern.
- The Sword of Essen is a 10th-century sword preserved at Essen Abbey, decorated with gold plating at the close of the 10th century.
- The Cawood sword, and the closely related Korsoygaden sword, are notable in the context of delineating "Viking Age swords" from derived high medieval types; these swords fit neatly into the "Viking sword" typology, but Oakeshott (1991) considers them derived types dating to the 12th century.

== See also ==
- Migration period sword
- Viking Age arms and armour
- Ulfberht
- Ingelrii
