= Reiterschwert =

Reiterschwert is the German term for "cavalry sword" (not to be confused with Ritterschwert "knightly sword"). Specifically, it may refer to:

- The Roman spatha (as the sword of the Roman cavalry)
- The late 16th century sword of the Reiter
