= Cawood sword =

Medieval sword discovered in England

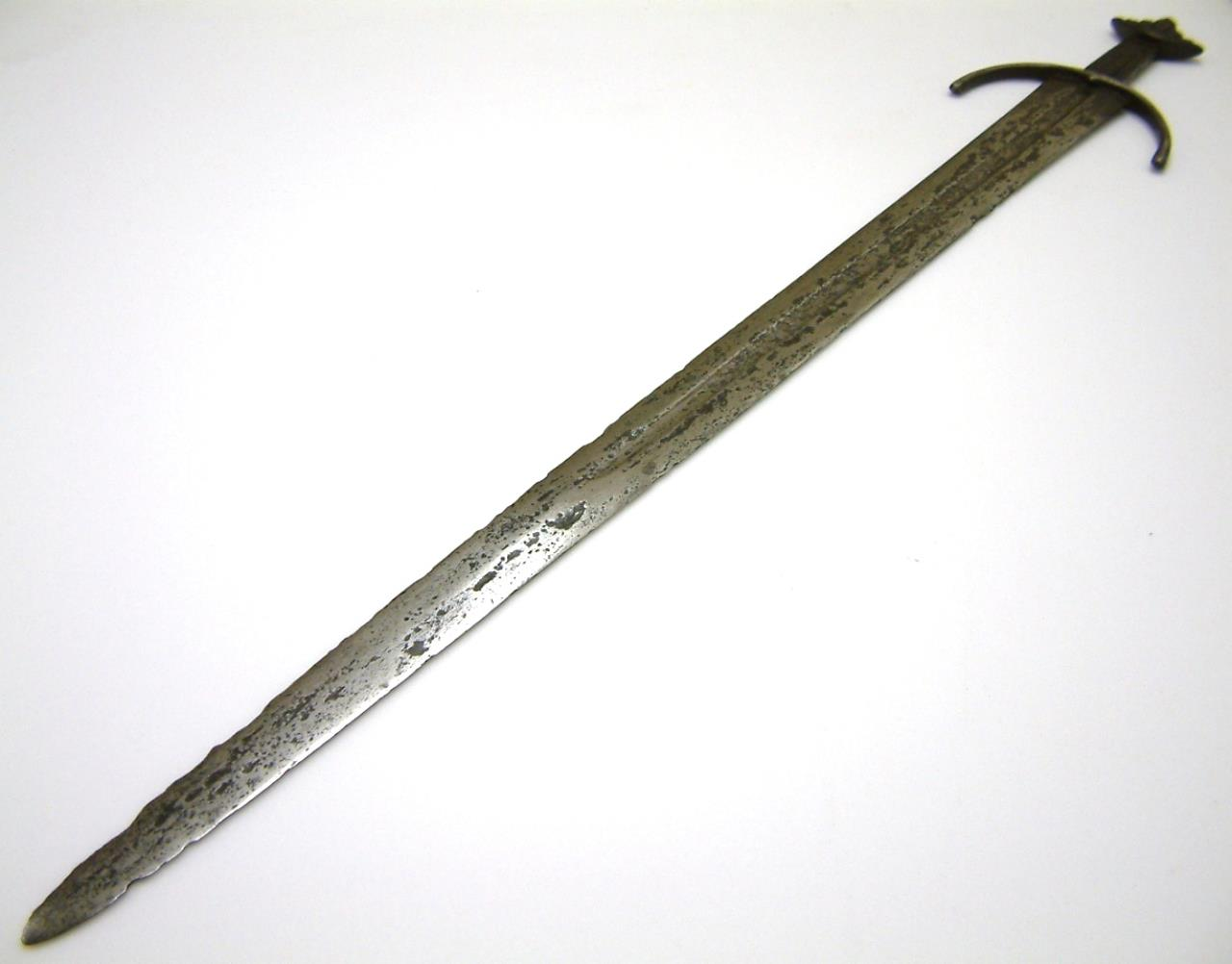
- The Cawood sword
- Material: Iron, pewter
- Period/culture: Medieval
- Discovered: late 19th century River Ouse, near Cawood, North Yorkshire
- Present location: Medieval Gallery, Yorkshire Museum, York

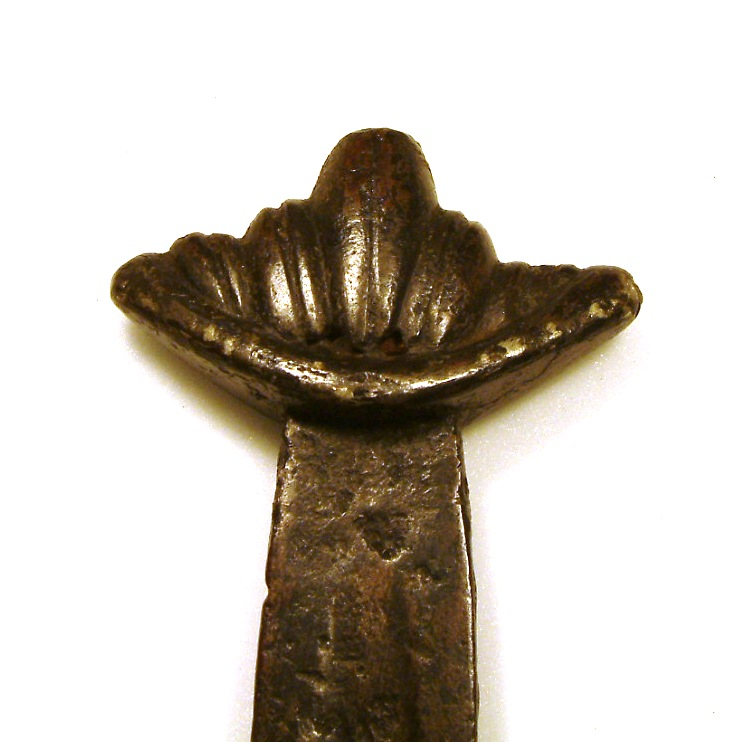
Closeup of the pommel

The Cawood sword is a medieval sword discovered in the River Ouse near Cawood in North Yorkshire in the late 19th century. The blade is of Oakeshott type XII and has inscriptions on both sides. It most likely dates to the early 12th century.

== Significance ==
The sword is notable as the best-preserved specimen of a small group of medieval swords with a type M pommel in the typology of Oakeshott (1964). This type of pommel is an apparently specifically British derivation of the Viking Age multi-lobed pommel. It is often found on tomb effigies of the mid 13th to mid 14th century in southern Scotland and northern England, but it may have been in existence since the 11th century.

A very similar sword, likely from the same workshop, was discovered in Norway in 1888 while railway work was being conducted on farmland at Korsoygaden in Stange Municipality in the Hedmarken district.

== Dating ==
The question of the date of these swords is of some importance for the absolute chronology of the development of sword morphology in medieval Europe. In 1964, Oakeshott stated that while both swords were "long believed" to date to the late 11th or early 12th century, suggested by the "Viking sword"-type pommel and the runic inscription on the Korsoygaden sword, they could not possibly predate the mid 13th century because of the style of the Cawood sword's inscriptions, and because the pommel type was not in fact in "Viking Age" style, but in a "late" British derivation of pommel shapes of the Viking Age.

However, in 1991, Oakeshott revisited this opinion based on the style of the runic inscription on the Korsoygaden sword. The 12th-century date for both swords is based on this argument. This, i.e. the combined evidence from the Cawood and the Korsoygaden swords, are of "extreme importance" for the dating of swords and blade inscriptions of the 11th to 12th centuries.

Oakeshott (1991) presents a group of eight swords, some of which were previously dated to c. 1300, which based on close morphological parallels to these swords must be reassigned to the period of c. 1000–1120. Oakeshott's date for the Cawood sword itself is now c. 1100–1150. This has consequences for the dating of medieval sword blade inscriptions, as the inscriptions on the Cawood blade are very typical of the "garbled" letter-group inscriptions on high medieval blades (tentatively transcribed as ✠NnRDIOnNnR✠ ⊕N［RSRDIGATON［I).

== Ownership and display ==
The Cawood sword was kept at the Tower of London until the 1950s and then sold into private hands. It was again on display in The Age of Chivalry exhibition at Burlington House in 1987.

It was acquired by the Yorkshire Museum, York in December 2007. Since 2017 it has featured as one of the key objects in the exhibition 'Medieval York: Capital of the North'.
