= Pernik sword =

Medieval sword found in Bulgaria

The Pernik sword is a medieval double-edged iron sword unearthed in the ruins of the medieval fortress of Krakra near Pernik, western Bulgaria, on 1 January 1921. It bears an inscription in silver inlay on the blade. The sword is preserved in the National Archaeological Museum of Bulgaria in Sofia. The sword is 96 centimetres (38 in) long and up to 4.5 cm (1.8 in) wide.

The blade inscription is typical of the 12th-century "garbled" in nomine type, reading +IHININIhVILPIDHINIhVILPN+. Comparable blade inscriptions range from the comparatively clear NNOMNEDMN to the heavily distorted 00NINOMINED, OIEDOMINI, INNIOINNEDINI. There is a scholarly tradition of attempts to interpret this type of inscription as abbreviations or contractions, e.g. reading INPMPNC as 'I(n) n(omine) p(atris) M(ater) p(atris) n(ostri) C(hristi)'. Following such proposals, Mihailov (1985) proposed a tentative reading of the Pernik inscription along the lines of "IH(ESUS). IN I(HESUS) N(OMINE). IH(ESUS) VI(RGO). L(AUS) P(ATRIS) I(HESUS) D(OMINI) H(RISTUS). IN IH(ESUS) VI(RGO). L(AUS) P(ATRIS) N(OSTRIS)". By contrast, Dentschewa (2005) argued for a Lombardic interpretation of IH INI NI hVIL PIDH, INI hVIL PN, meaning 'I do not await eternity, I am eternity'.
