= Ulfberht swords =

Type of medieval European sword

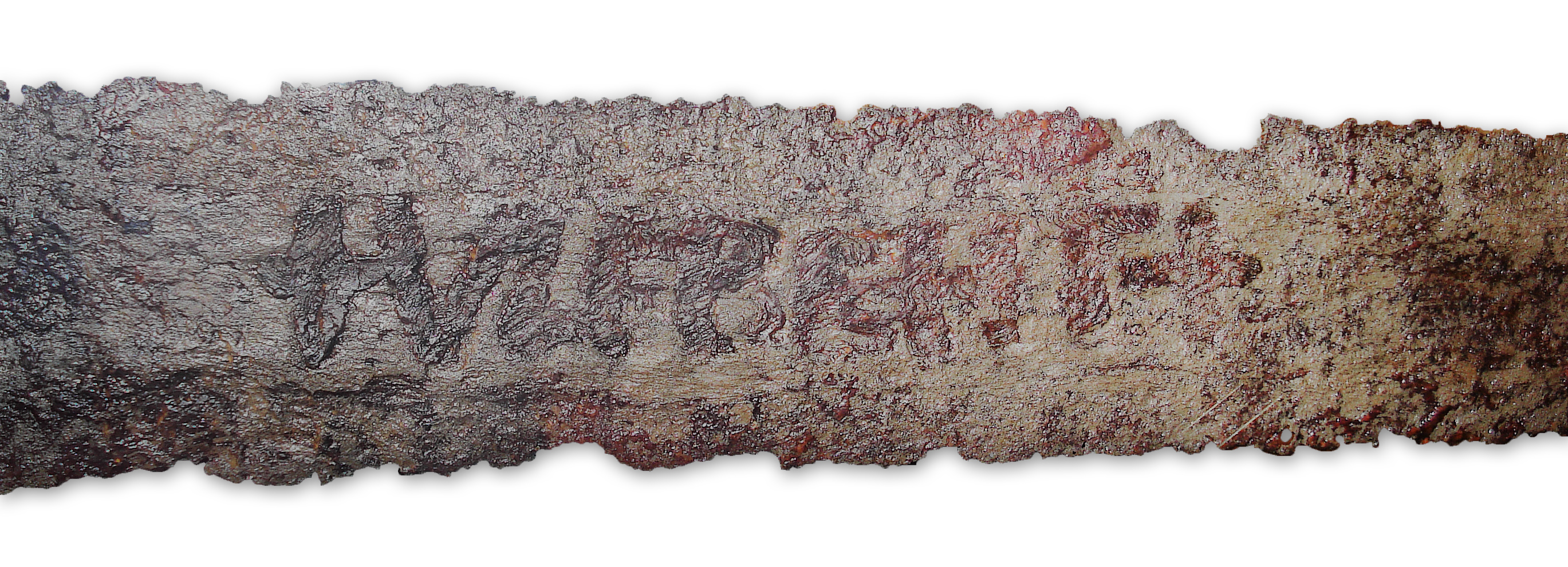
- +VLFBEHT+ inscription on the blade of a 9th-century sword (Germanisches Nationalmuseum FG 2187) found in 1960 in the Old Rhine close to Friesenheimer Insel, Mannheim
- Type: Sword

Production history
- Produced: 9th to 11th centuries

Specifications
- Mass: avg. 1.2 kg (2.7 lb)
- Length: avg. 91 cm (36 in)
- Width: 5 cm (2 in)
- Blade type: Double-edged, straight bladed, slight taper
- Hilt type: One-handed with pommel, variable guard
- Head type: Acute distal taper, and point

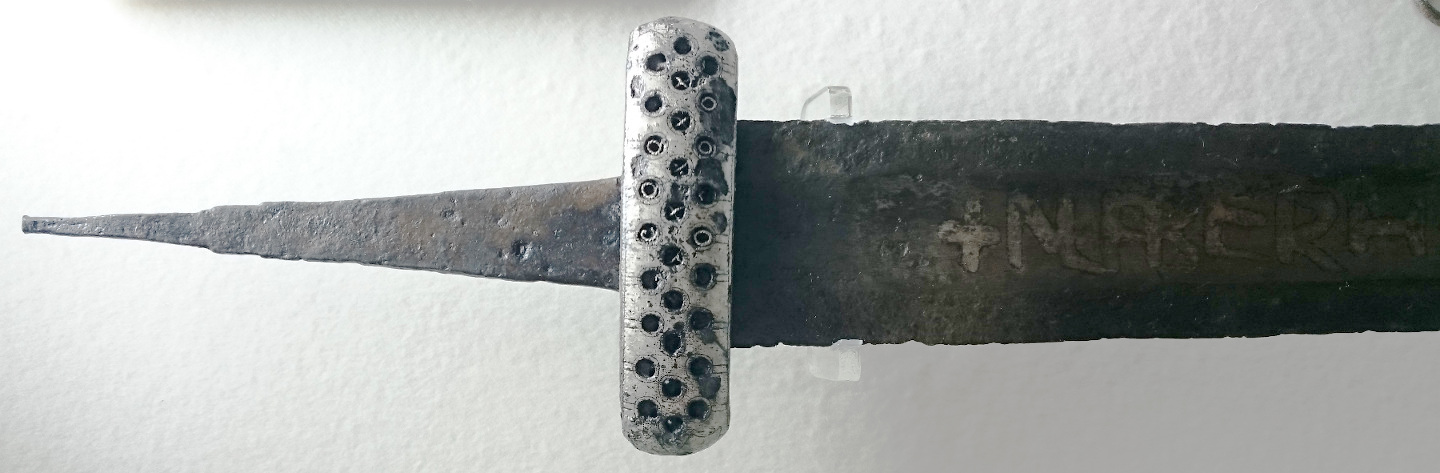
One of three Ulfberht swords found in the territory of the Volga Bulgars. Its hilt (classified as Petersen type T-2) is decorated with three lines of round holes inlaid with twisted silver wire.

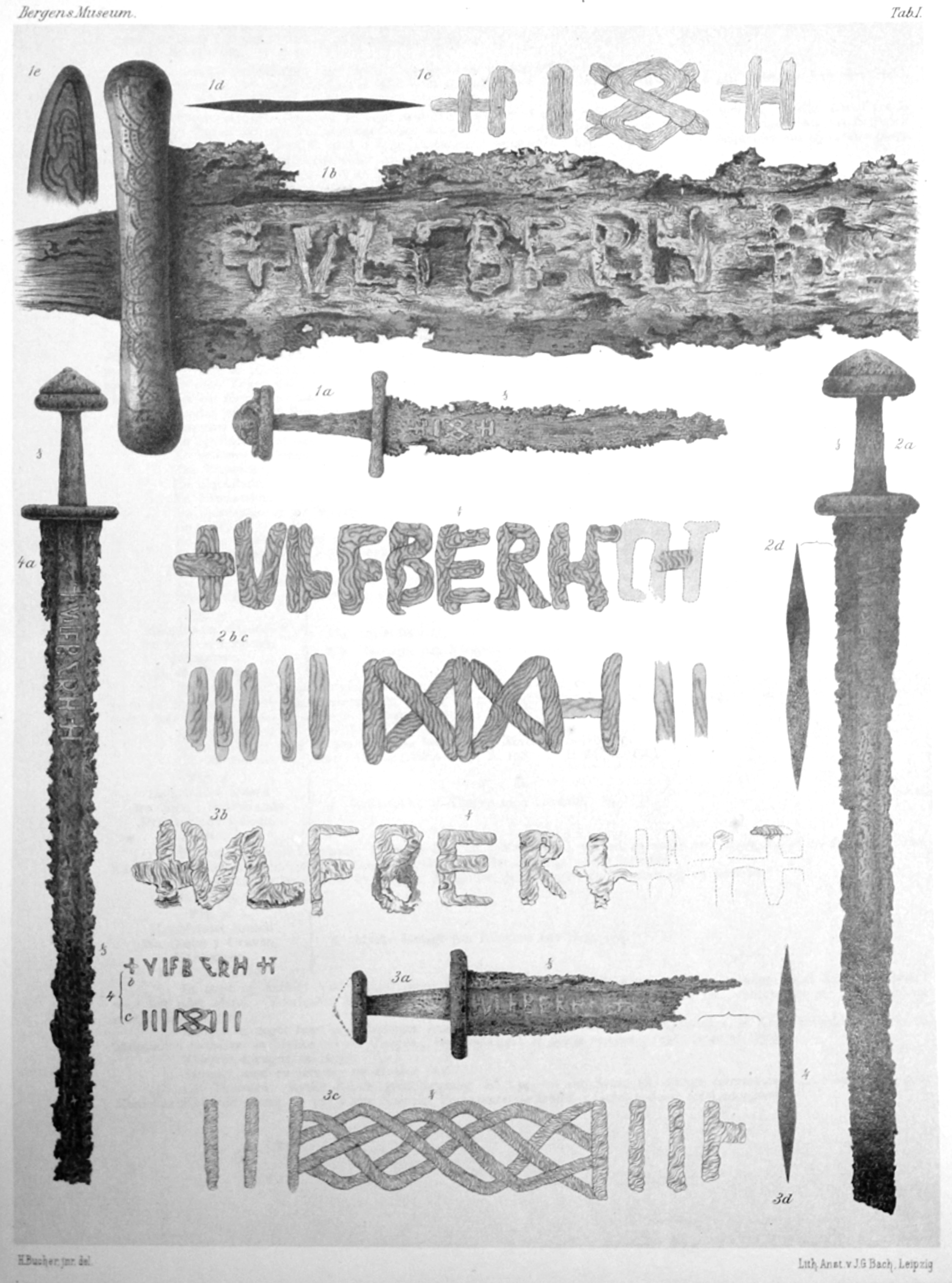
Four Ulfberht swords found in Norway (drawings from Lorange 1889)

The Ulfberht swords are a group of about 170 medieval swords found primarily in Northern Europe, dated to the 9th to 11th centuries, with blades inlaid with the inscription +VLFBERH+T or +VLFBERHT+. The word "Ulfberht" is a Frankish personal name, possibly indicating the origin of the blades.

== Description ==
The swords are at the transitional point between the Viking sword and the high medieval knightly sword. Most have blades of Oakeshott type X. They are also the starting point of the much more varied high medieval tradition of blade inscriptions. The reverse sides of the blades are inlaid with a geometric pattern, usually a braid pattern between vertical strokes. Numerous blades also bear this type of geometric pattern but no Vlfberht inscription.

Ulfberht swords were made during a period when European swords were still predominantly pattern welded ("false Damascus"), but with larger blooms of steel gradually becoming available, so that higher quality swords made after AD 1000 are increasingly likely to have crucible steel blades. The group of Ulfberht swords includes a wide spectrum of steel and production methods. One example from a 10th-century grave in Nemilany, Moravia, has a pattern welded core with welded-on hardened cutting edges. Another example appears to have been made from high-quality hypereutectoid steel possibly imported from Central Asia.

== Origin ==
Ulfberht swords most likely originated in the Rhineland region, i.e., in Austrasia, the core region of the Frankish realm, later part of the Franconian stem duchy. Frankish origin of the swords has long been assumed because of the form of the personal name Ulfberht.

Despite their assumed Frankish origin, the majority of the swords have been found in Northern Europe. Rather than being traded items, the swords were most likely exported as loot, ransom, or contraband — prohibitions in the Carolingian capitularia made it illegal to sell to foreigners at the time. Three specimens have been found as far afield as Volga Bulgaria, at the time part of the Volga trade route.

== Number and distribution ==
A total of 167 Ulfberht swords have been found, mostly in the Fennoscandia region and around the Baltic Sea. The number of swords found in Finland is unclear; Stalsberg identifies 14 Finnish Ulfberht swords, but Moilanen identifies 31. In general, the exact number of swords found is debatable due to the fragmentary condition of some artifacts, and because some inscriptions appear to refer to the Ulfberht type rather than indicating that a specimen actually belongs to the type.

The prevalence of Ulfberht swords in the archaeological record of Northern Europe does not imply that such swords were more widely used there than in Francia; the pagan practice of placing weapons in warrior graves greatly favours the archaeological record in regions of Europe that were still pagan (and indeed most of the Ulfberht swords found in Norway are from warrior graves), while swords found in continental Europe and England after the 7th century are mostly limited to stray finds; e.g., in riverbeds. This is supported by the change in geographical distribution noted in the late Viking Age, when much of previously Pagan Europe was Christianized. None of the Norwegian Ulfberht swords are dated later than the early—middle 11th century, which coincides with the end of Pagan burial rites in the area.

Location and dating of known Ulfberht swords
Country	Early Viking Age (8th - 9th ce.)	Middle Viking Age (10th ce.)	Late Viking Age (10th - 11th ce.)	Undated	Total
Norway	17	19	5	3	44
Sweden	9	3	1	4	17
Finland	2	3	2	7	14 (Note: According to Stalsberg (2008, p. 11, map 1) the number of swords is 14. However, according to Moilanen (2015, p. 126) the number of swords is 31. The reason for the discrepancy between the two sources is unclear, but may be due to the fragmentary nature of some specimens outlined in Moilanen.)
Estonia	2	3	1	3	9
Latvia	1	1	4	1	7
Lithuania	-	1	-	1	2
Belarus	-	1	-	-	1
Ukraine	1	5	-	1 (Note: In 2022, Ukrainian authorities seized an archaeological collection belonging to former Ukrainian politician Valeriy Horbatov, which included an Ulfberht sword of unknown origin. His collection largely comprised artefacts obtained through archaeological looting in Ukraine. In 2025, he reached a plea agreement with investigators, offering to donate the entire collection, including the Ulfberht sword, to the National Museum of the History of Ukraine.)	7
Russia	4	5	1	1	11
Russia (Kaliningrad Oblast)	2	4	2	4	12
Poland	-	3	3	1	7
Czechia	-	1	1	-	2
Croatia	2	-	-	-	2
Italy	-	-	-	1	1
Switzerland	-	-	1	-	1
Germany	2	2	9	-	13
Denmark	-	3	-	-	3
Netherlands	2	-	-	1	3
Belgium	-	-	2	-	2
England	1	1	2	-	4
Ireland	2	-	-	-	2
Iceland	-	2	-	-	2
Spain	-	-	1	-	1
France	-	-	1	-	1
Total	47	57	36	28	168

== Dating ==
The original Ulfberht sword type dates to the 9th or 10th century, but swords with the Ulfberht inscription continued to be made at least until the end of the Viking Age in the 11th century. A notable late example found in Eastern Germany, dated to the 11th or possibly early 12th century, represents the only specimen that combines the Vlfberht signature with a Christian "in nomine domini" inscription (+IINIOMINEDMN). As a given name, Wulfbert (Old High German Wolfbert, Wolfbrecht, Wolfpert, Wolfperht, Vulpert) is recorded from the 8th to 10th centuries.

== See also ==
- Viking Age arms and armour
- Ingelrii, a similar inscription type
- Blade inscription

== Works cited ==
- Anders Lorange, Den yngre jernalders sværd, Bergen (1889).
- Rudolf Wegeli, Inschriften auf mittelalterlichen Schwertklingen, Leipzig (1904).
- Anne Stalsberg, Herstellung und Verbreitung der Vlfberht-Schwertklingen. Eine Neubewertung, Zeitschrift für Archäologie des Mittelalters, 36, 2008, 89-118 (English translation).
- Mikko Moilanen, Marks of Fire, Value and Faith: Swords with Ferrous Inlays in Finland during the Late Iron Age (ca. 700–1200 AD), Turku (2015), ISBN 978-952-67329-6-1 (Online access).
- M. Müller-Wille: Ein neues ULFBERHT-Schwert aus Hamburg. Verbreitung, Formenkunde und Herkunft, Offa 27, 1970, 65-91
