= Knightly sword =

Straight, double-edged bladed weapon

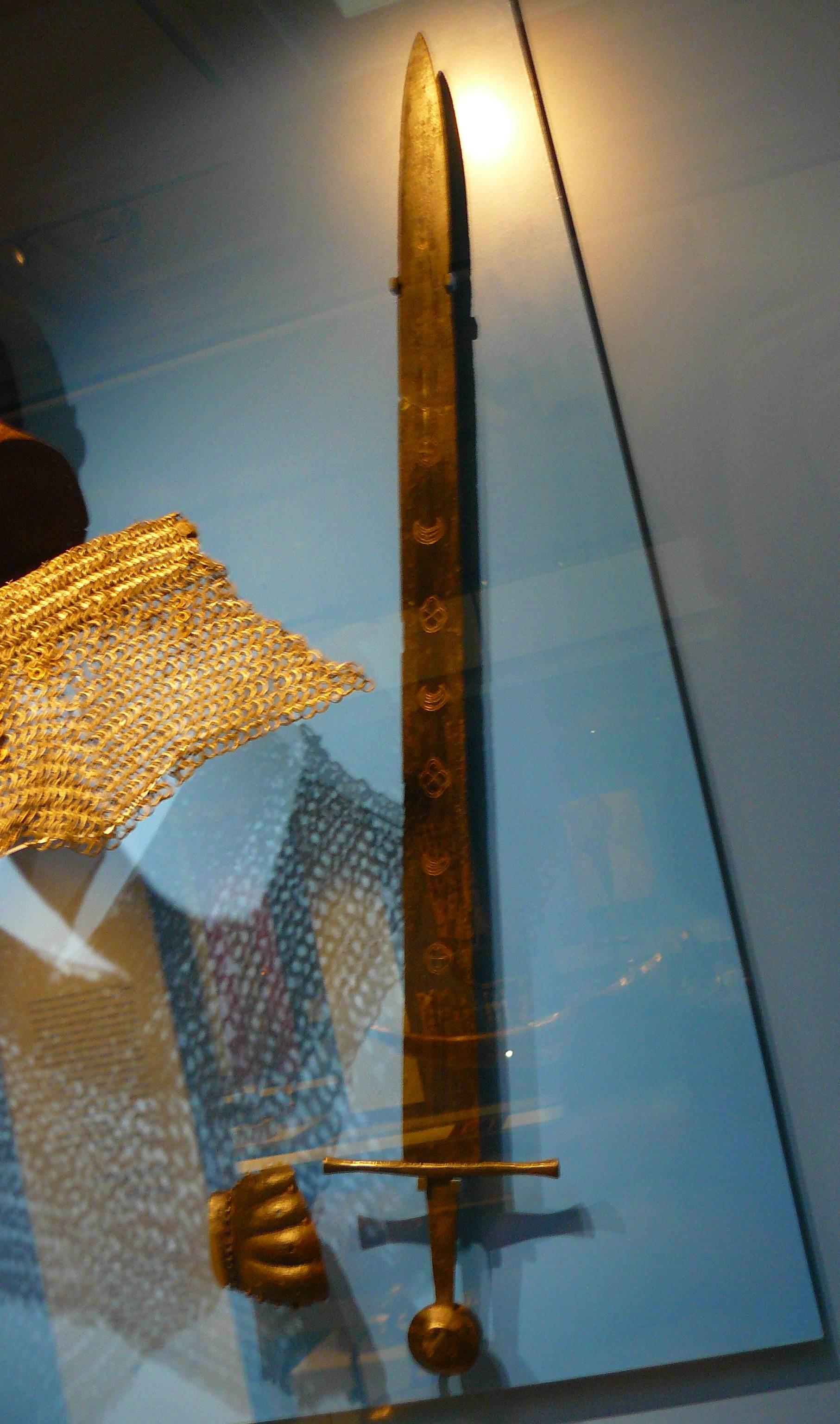
- Sword, dated c. 1250–1330, British Museum
- Type: Sword

Service history
- In service: c. 950–1500

Specifications
- Mass: avg. 1–1.5 kg (2.2–3.3 lb)
- Length: avg. 90–105 cm (35–41 in)
- Blade length: avg. 75–90 cm (30–35 in)
- Blade type: Double-edged, straight bladed
- Hilt type: One-handed cruciform, with pommel

In the European High Middle Ages, the typical sword (sometimes academically categorized as the knightly sword, arming sword, or in full, knightly arming sword) was a straight, double-edged weapon with a single-handed, cruciform (i.e., cross-shaped) hilt and a blade length of about 70 to 80 centimetres (28 to 31 in). This type is frequently depicted in period artwork, and numerous examples have been preserved archaeologically.

The high medieval sword of the Romanesque period (10th to 13th centuries) developed gradually from the Carolingian sword of the 9th century. In the Late Medieval period (14th and 15th centuries), late forms of these swords continued to be used, but often as a sidearm, at that point called "arming swords" and contrasting with the two-handed, heavier longswords.

Though the majority of late-medieval arming swords kept their blade properties from previous centuries, there are also surviving specimens from the 15th century that took the form of a late-medieval estoc, specialised for use against more heavily armoured opponents. After the end of the medieval period, the arming sword developed into several forms of the early modern one-handed straight swords, such as the side-sword, the rapier, the cavalry-focused Reiterschwert and certain types of broadsword.

== Terminology ==
The term "arming sword" (espées d'armes) is first used in the 15th century to refer to the single-handed type of sword after it had ceased to serve as the main weapon and was on its way to being used as a side-sword. "Arming sword" in late medieval usage specifically refers to the estoc when worn as a side-arm, but as a modern term it may also refer to any single-handed sword in a late medieval context. The terms "knight's sword" or "knightly sword" are modern terms to specify the sword of the high medieval period.

Period terminology for swords is somewhat fluid. Mostly, the common type of sword in any given period would simply be referred to as "sword" (English swerde, French espée, Latin gladius etc.). During the high medieval period, references to swords as "great sword" (grete swerd, grant espée) or "small" or "short sword" (espée courte, parvus ensis) do not necessarily indicate their morphology, but simply their relative size. Oakeshott (1964) notes that this changes in the late medieval period, beginning towards the end of the 13th century, when the "bastard sword" appeared as an early type of what developed into the 15th-century longsword.

The term "romanesque sword" does not see significant use in English, but it is more current in French (epée romane), German (romanisches Schwert), and especially in Slavic languages (such as Czech románský meč), identifying the swords as being contemporary with the corresponding Romanesque period in art history (roughly 1000 to 1300).

== History ==
The knightly sword developed in the 10th century from the Carolingian sword. The most evident morphological development is the appearance of the crossguard. The transitional swords of the 10th and 11th centuries are also known as Norman swords. Already in the 10th century, some of the "finest and most elegant" of the Ulfberht type of "Viking" (actually Carolingian/Frankish) swords began to exhibit a more slender blade geometry, moving the center of mass closer to the hilt to improve wieldability.

The one-handed sword of the high medieval period was typically used with a shield or buckler. In the late medieval period, when the longsword came to predominate, the single-handed sword was retained as a common sidearm, especially of the estoc type, and came to be referred to as an "arming sword", later evolving into the cut and thrust swords of the Renaissance.

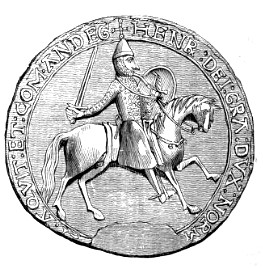
Great Seal of Henry II of England, showing the king as an armed horseman, c. 1154.

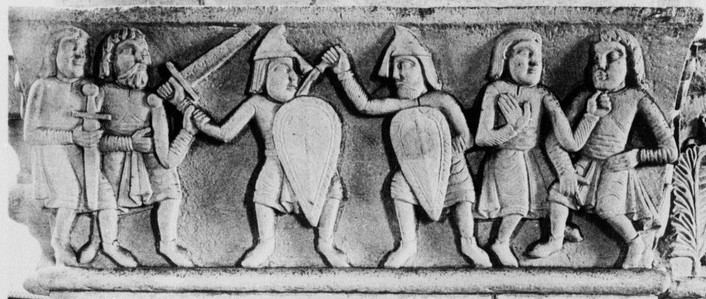
The so-called Guido-Relief in the Grossmünster, Zürich, depicts two combatants with helmets and kite shields, one with a dagger, the other with a sword (inscribed GVIDO on the blade), c. 1160–1180.

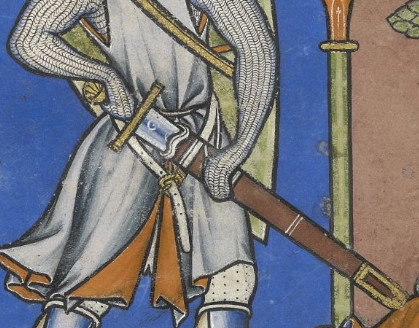
Detail of a sword being drawn from its scabbard, Morgan Bible fol. 28v, c. 1250.

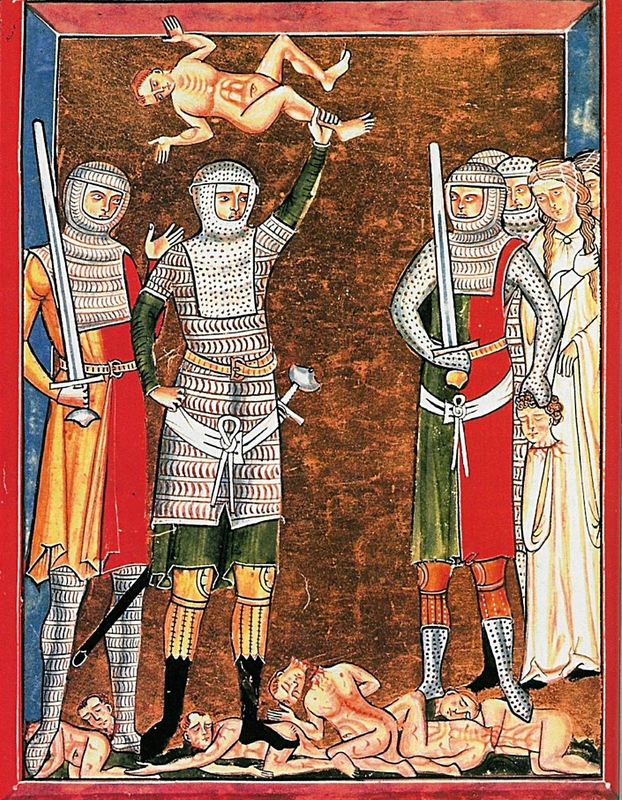
Soldiers in mail armour with swords, German miniature of the Massacre of the Innocents, c. 1250.

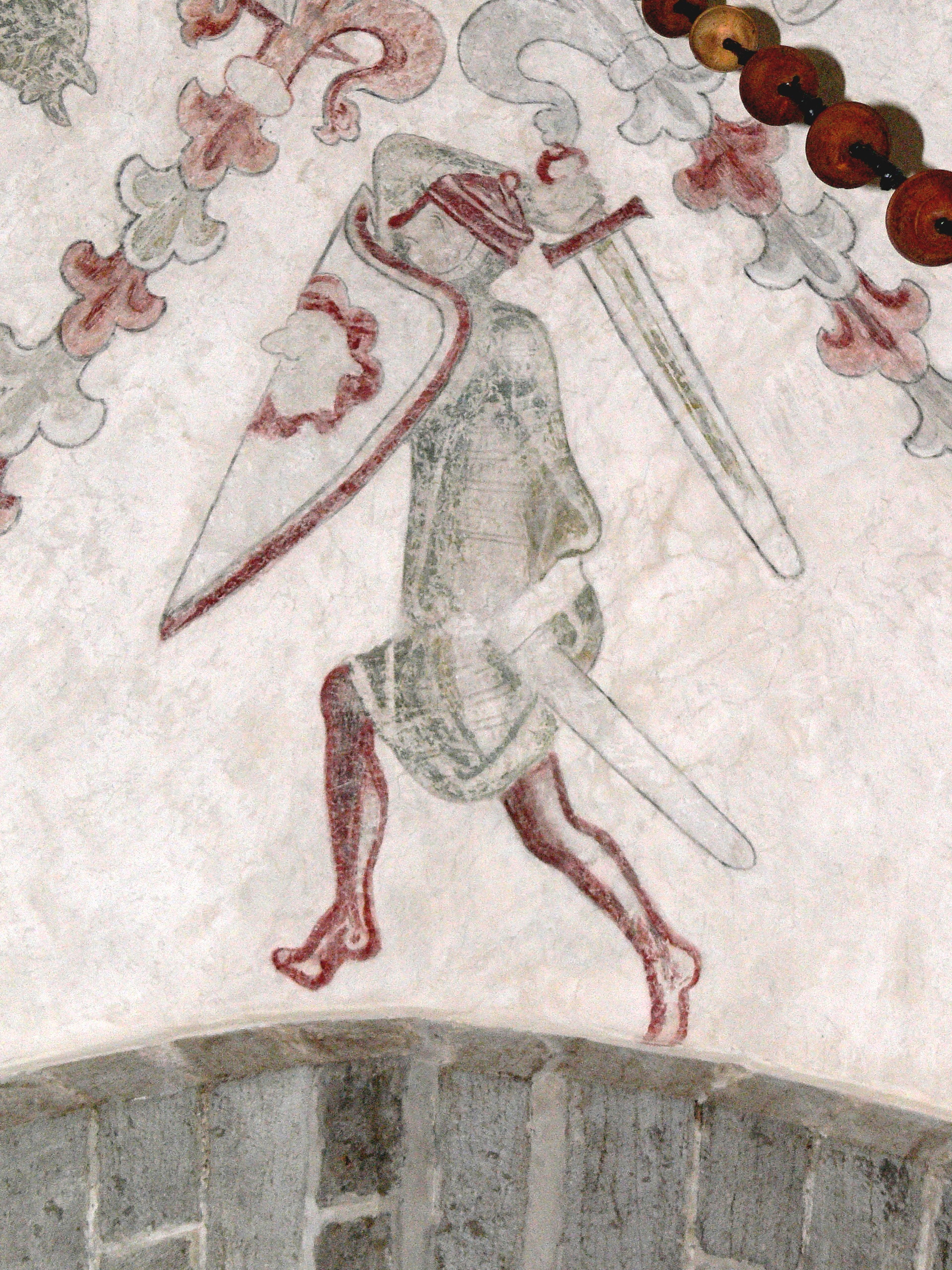
Painting of a fighter with sword, helmet and kite shield, fresco in Gothem Church, c. 1300.

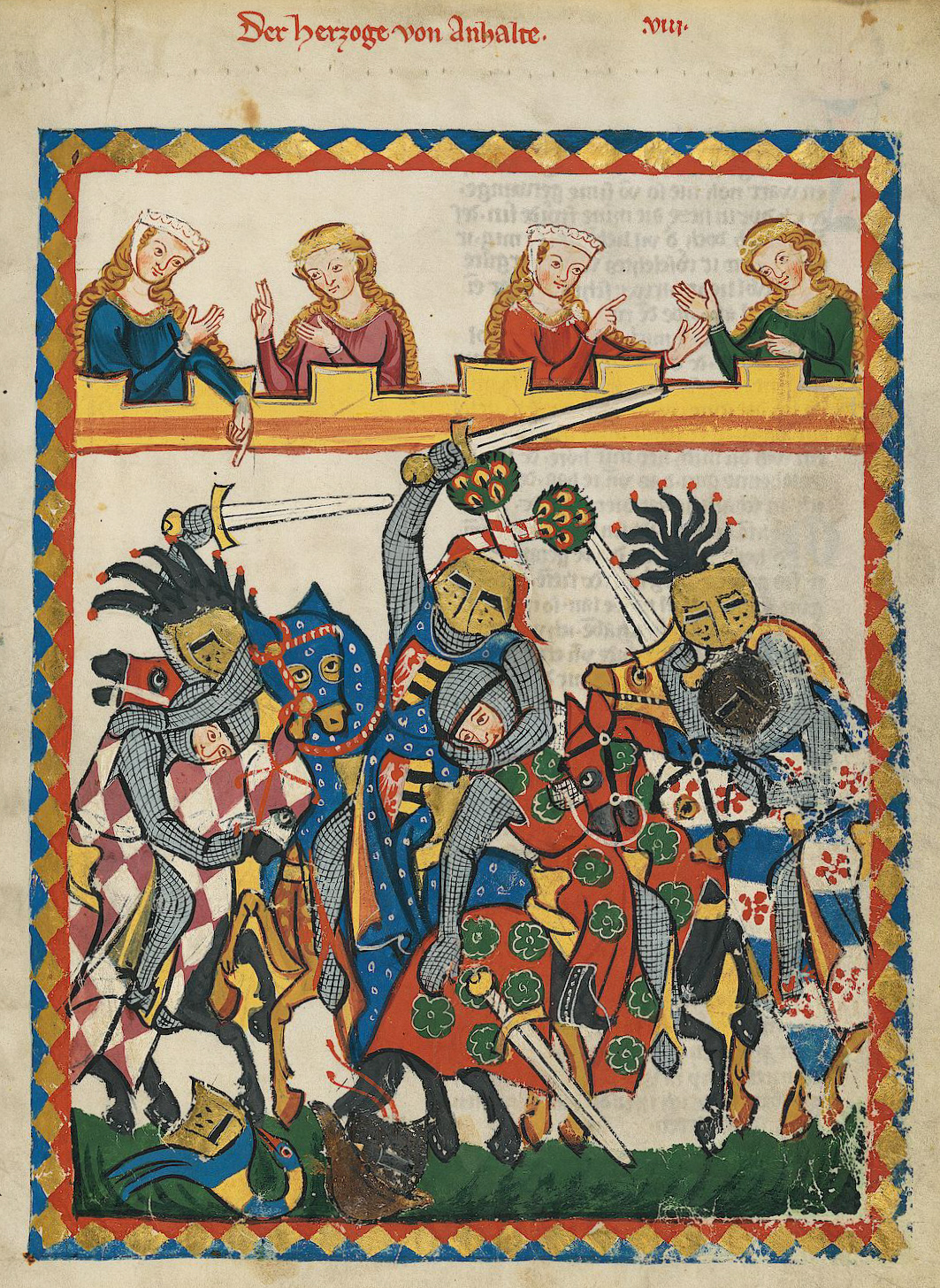
Illustration mock combat in a tournament, Codex Manesse (Herzog von Anhalt, fol. 17r), c. 1305–1315.

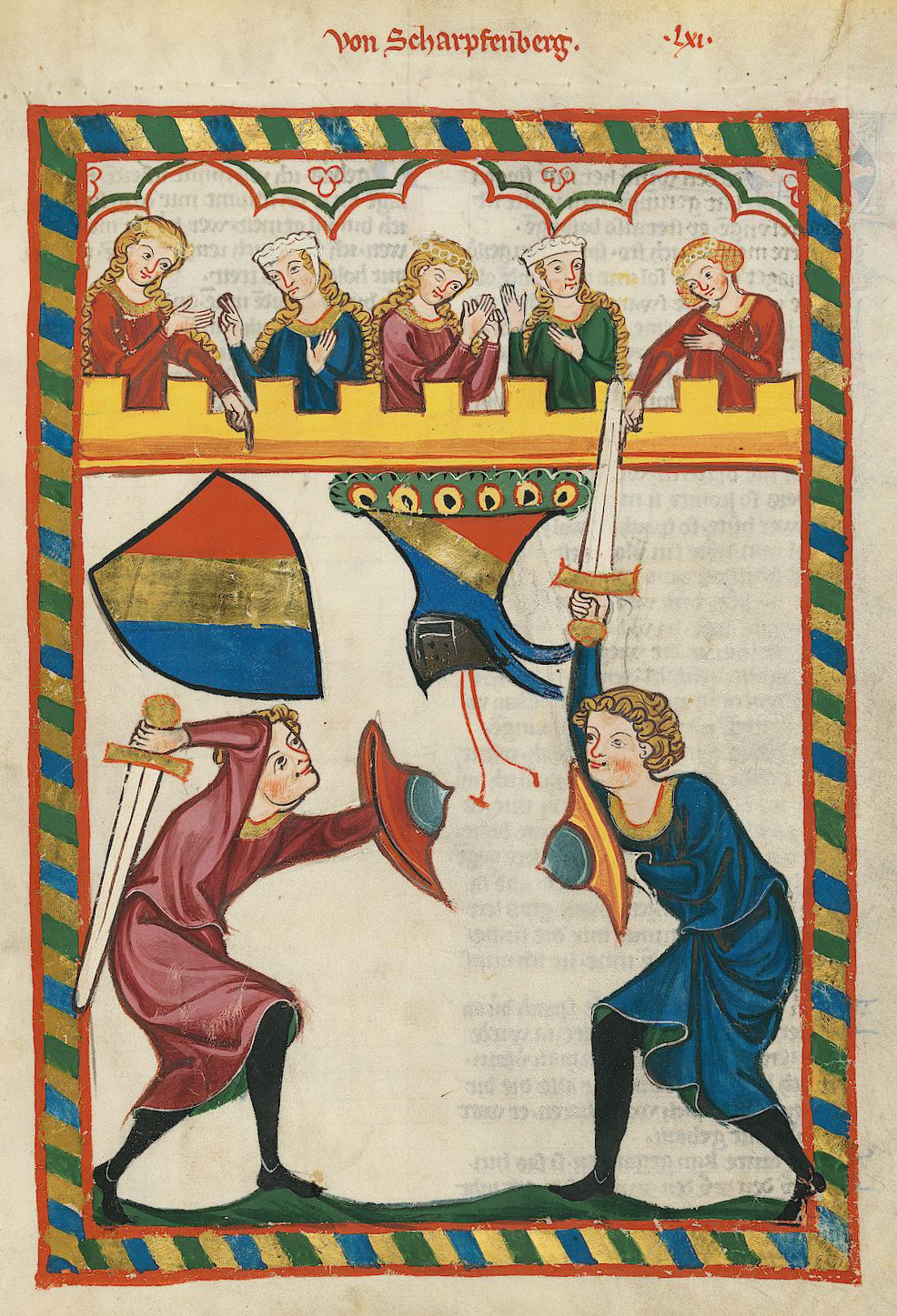
Illustration of combat with sword and buckler, Codex Manesse (Von Scharpfenberg, fol. 204r), c. 1305–1315.

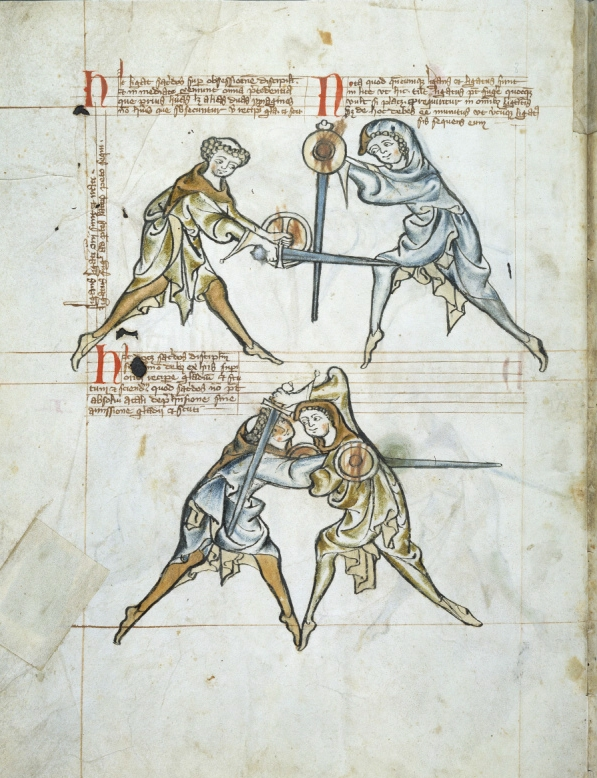
Fol. 4v of Royal Armouries MS I.33, a combat manual on fighting with sword and buckler, c. 1300.

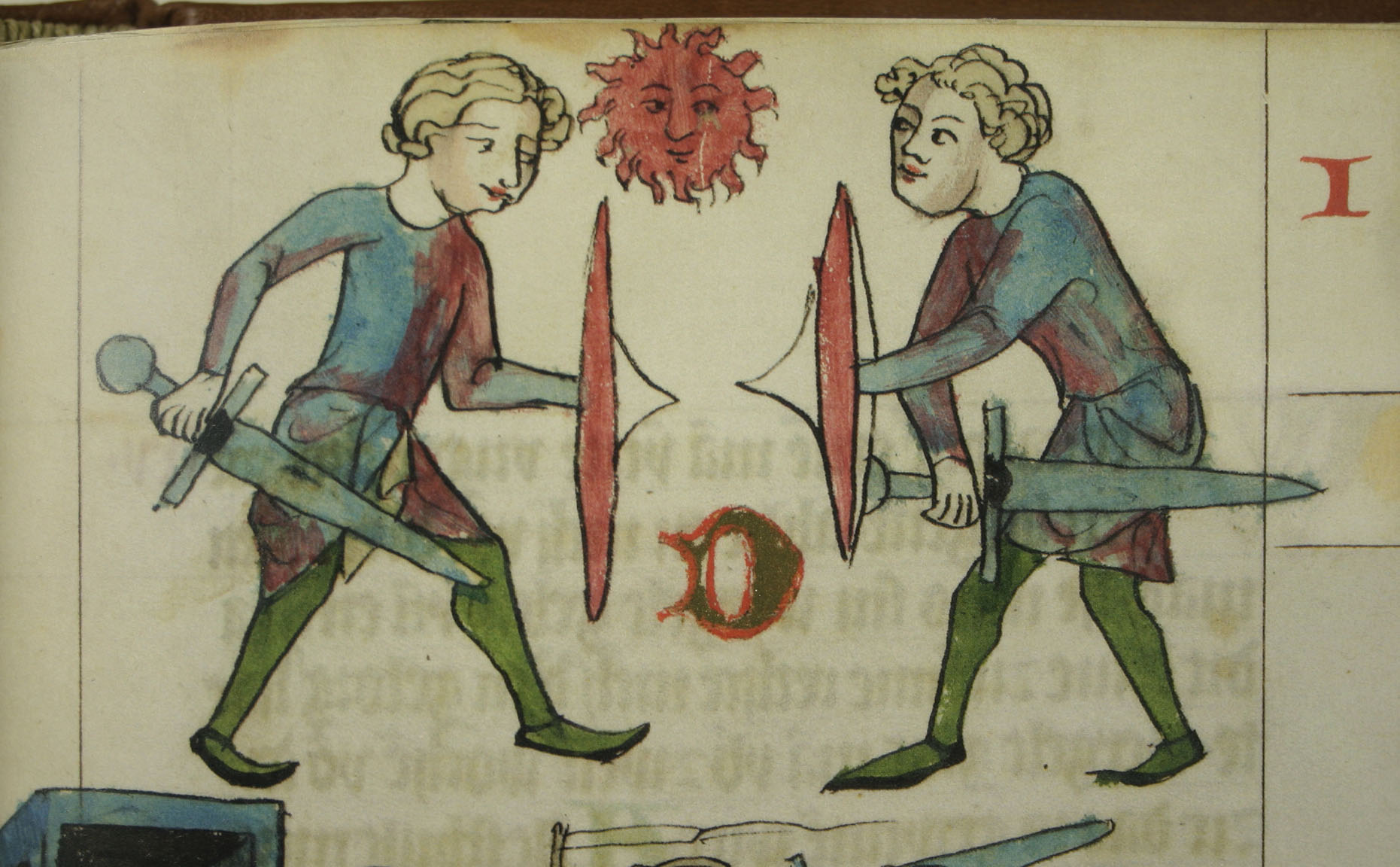
Judicial combat with sword and shield depicted in the Dresden ms. of the Sachsenspiegel, 14th century.

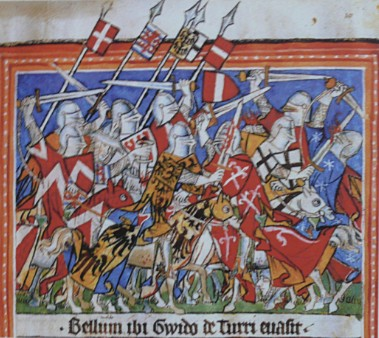
Melee combat between knights on horseback (troops of emperor Henry VII defeating the Guelph revolt led by Guido della Torre in Milan, 1311), Codex Balduini Trevirensis, c. 1320–1340.

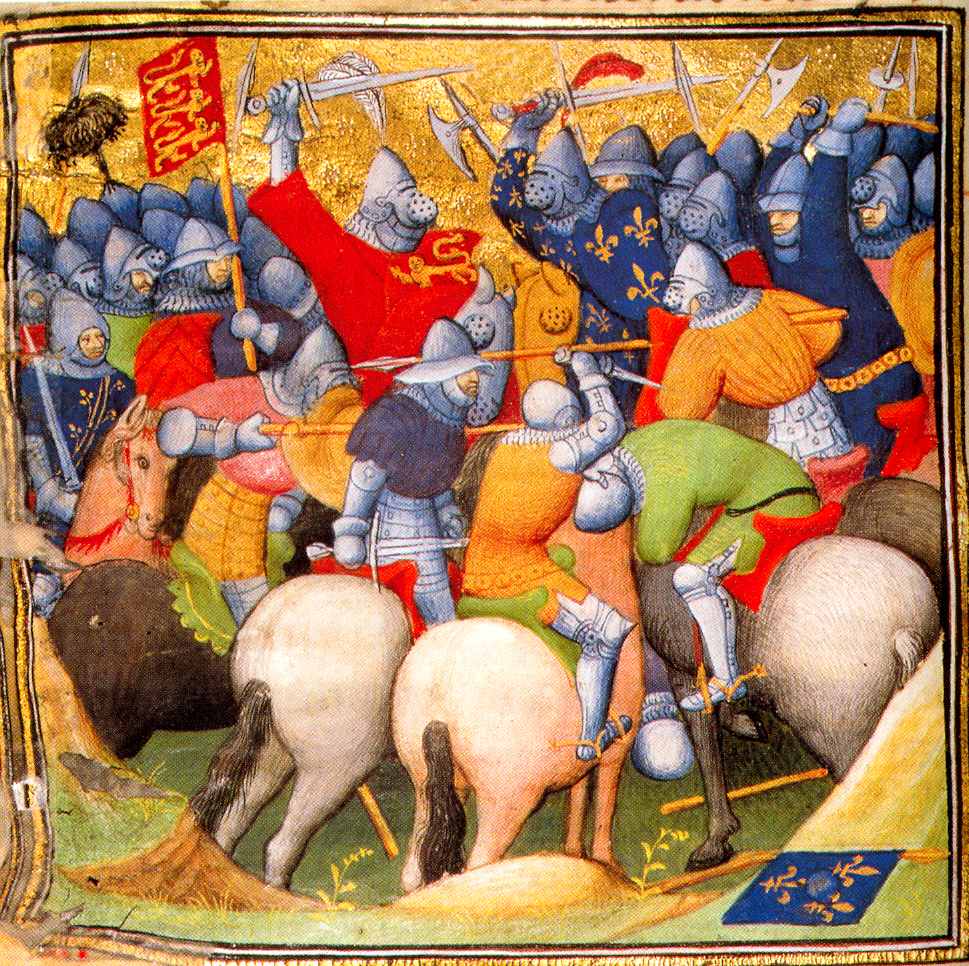
Mounted combat with swords at the Battle of Crécy (1346), Grandes Chroniques de France fol. 152v, c. 1415.

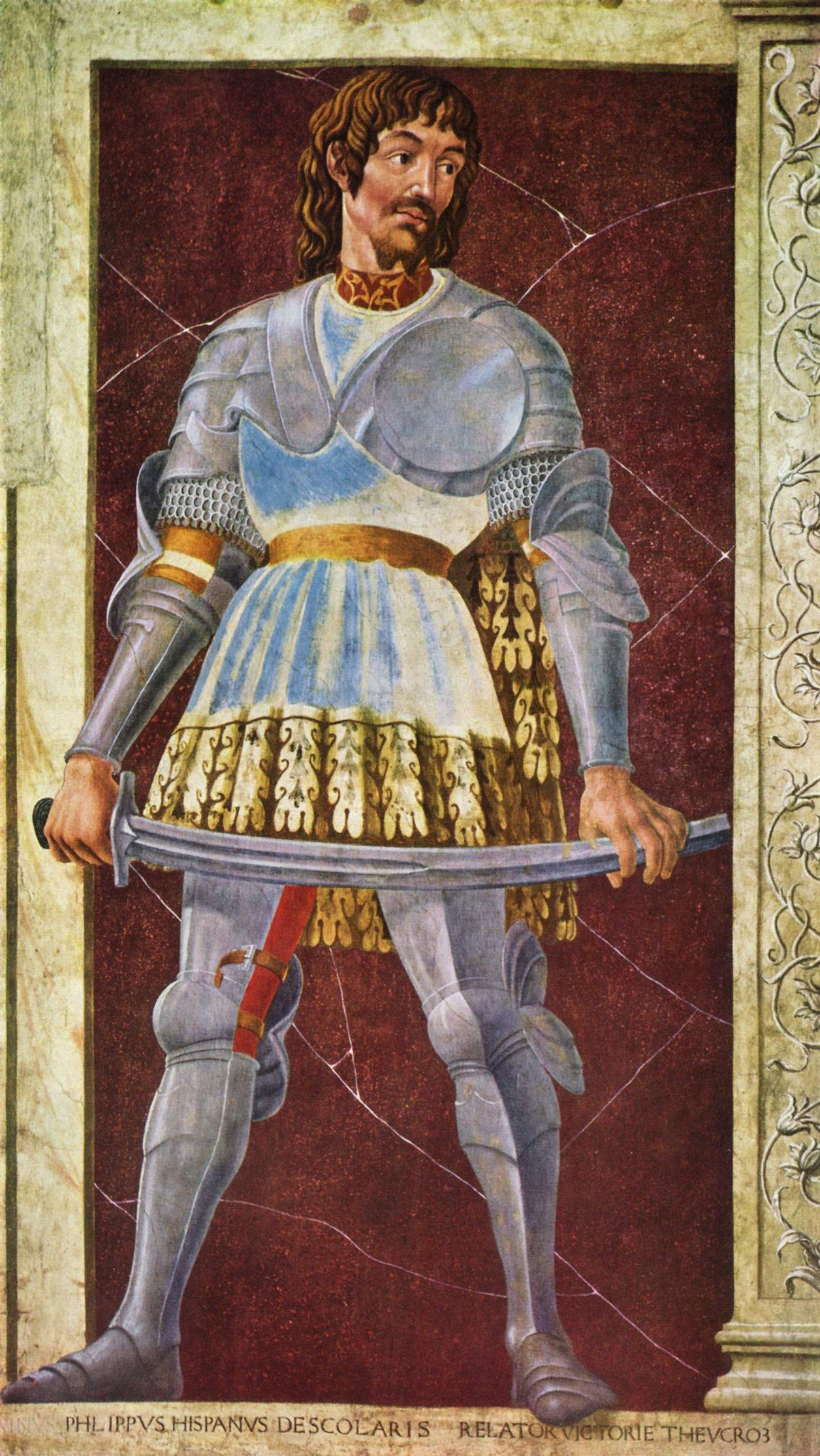
Painting of Condottiere Pippo Spano by Andrea del Castagno, c. 1450.

At the end of the medieval period, the estoc arming sword develops into the Spanish espada ropera and the Italian spada da lato, the predecessors of the early modern rapier. In a separate development, the schiavona was a heavier single-handed sword used by the Dalmatian bodyguard of the Doge of Venice in the 16th century. This type influenced the development of the early modern basket-hilted sword which in turn developed into the modern (Napoleonic era) cavalry sword.

== Morphology ==
The most widespread typology for the medieval sword was developed by Ewart Oakeshott in 1960, mostly based on blade morphology. Oakeshott (1964) introduced an additional typology for pommel shapes.

A more recent typology is due to Geibig (1991). Geibig's typology focuses on swords from continental the transitional period from the early to the high medieval period (early 8th to late 12th centuries) and does not extend to the late medieval period.

Blade length was usually from 69 to 81 centimetres (27 to 32 in); however, examples exist from 58 to 100 centimetres (23 to 39 in). Pommels were most commonly of the 'Brazil-nut' type from around 950–1200 AD, with the 'wheel' pommel appearing in the 11th and predominating from the 13th to 15th centuries.

However, Oakeshott (1991) is emphatic on the point that a medieval sword cannot conclusively be dated based on its morphology. While there are some general trends in the development of fashion, many of the most popular styles of pommels, hilts and blades remain in use throughout the duration of the High Middle Ages.

=== Blade ===
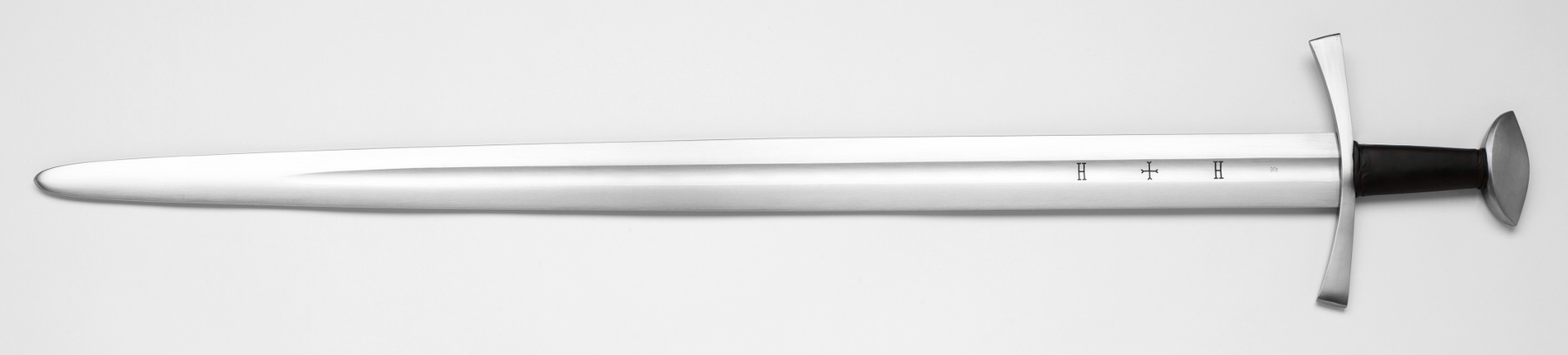
Replica of the Sword of Saint Maurice, one of the best-preserved 13th-century swords, now kept in Turin. It has a heavy, atypical type XII blade, presumably intended for use from horseback, with a type A "Brazil-nut" pommel. (Replica by Peter Johnsson, 2005.)

The common "knightly swords" of the high medieval period (11th to early 12th centuries) fall under types X to XII.

Type X is the Norman sword as it developed out of the early medieval Carolingian sword by the 10th century. Type XI shows the development towards a more tapering point seen during the 12th century. Type XII is a further development, typical throughout the Crusades period, showing a tapering blade with a shortened fuller. Subtype XIIa comprises the longer and more massive "great-swords" which developed in the mid-13th century, probably designed to counter improvements in mail armour; these are the predecessors of the late medieval longsword (see also Cawood sword).

Type XIII is the knightly sword typical of the later 13th century. Swords of this type have long, wide blades with parallel edges, terminating in a rounded or spatulate tip, and with a lens-shaped cross-section. The hilts become somewhat longer, about 15 cm (5.9 in), to allow occasional two-handed use. The pommels are mostly of the Brazil-nut or disk shapes. Subtype XIIIa has longer blades and hilts. These are the knightly "great-swords", or Grans espées d'Allemagne which seamlessly develop into the longsword type in the 14th century. Subtype XIIIb describes smaller single-handed swords of similar shape. The form classified as type XIV develops towards the very end of the high medieval period, around 1270, and remained popular during the early decades of the 14th century. They are often depicted on the tomb effigies of English knights of the period, but there are few surviving specimens. Continuations of the knightly sword as the "arming sword" type of the late medieval period correspond to Oakeshott types XV, XVI and XVIII.

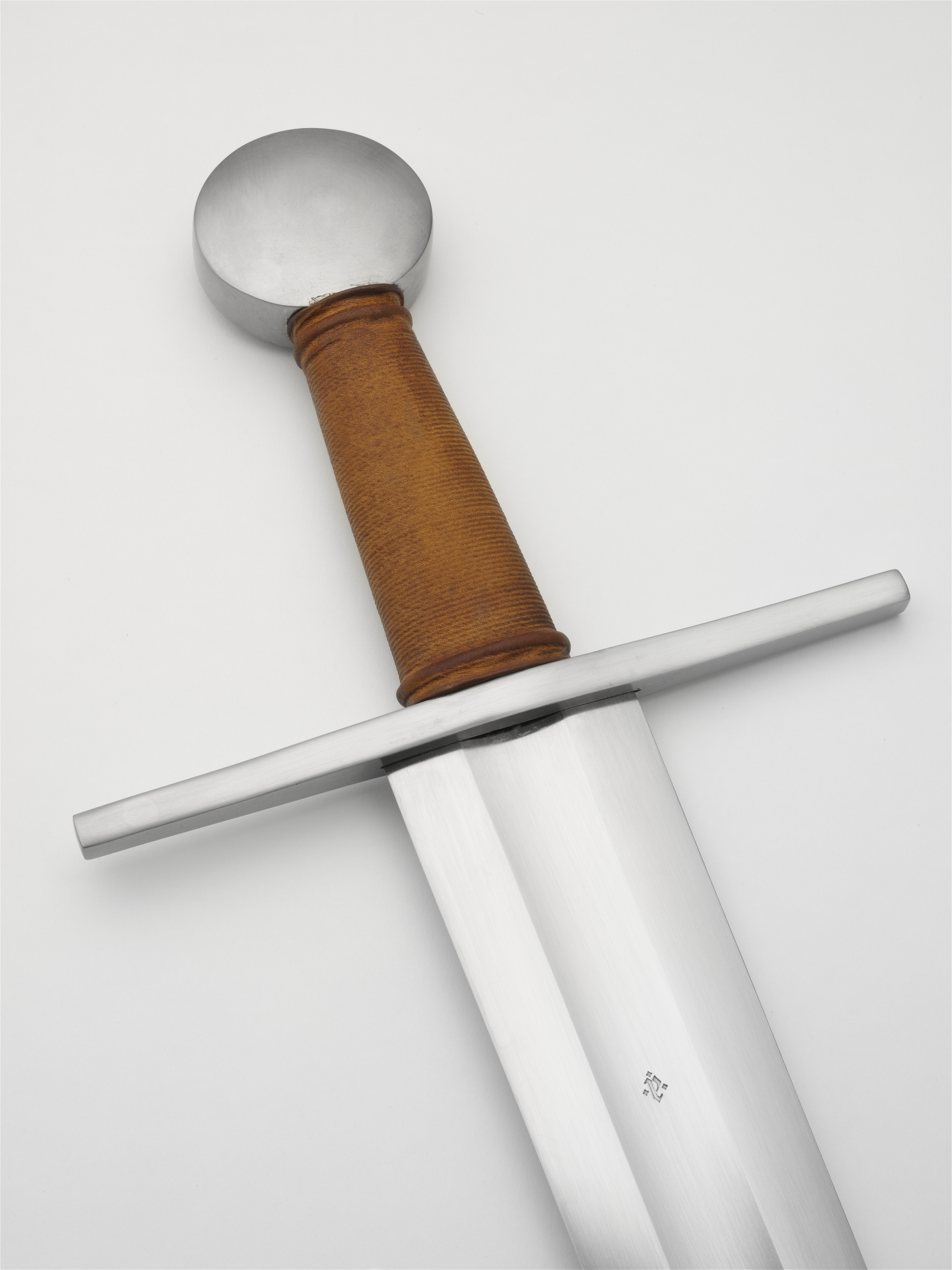
Replica of a type X Norman sword, typical of the mid-11th to 12th centuries

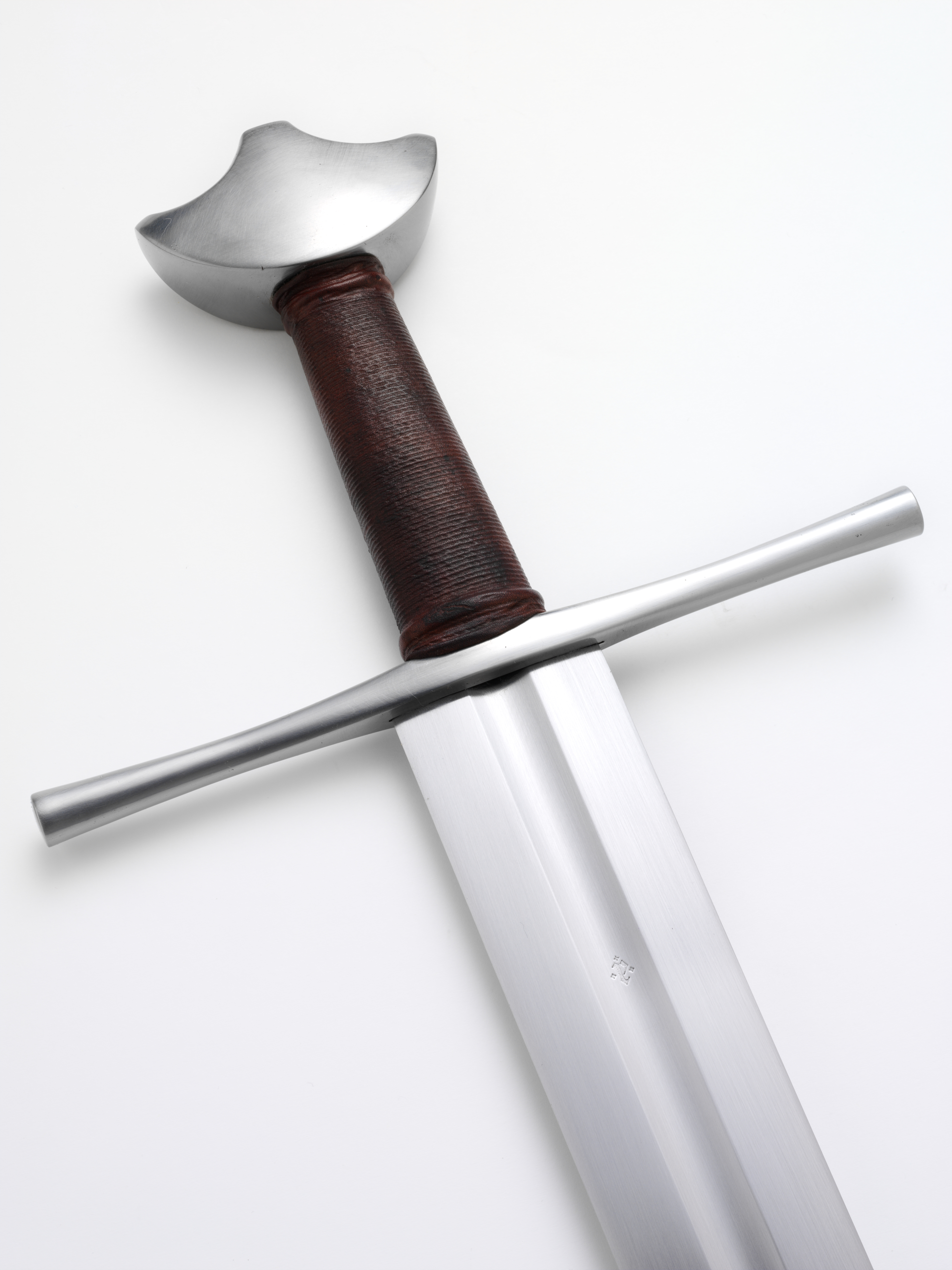
Replica of a type XI sword with a "cocked-hat" pommel (type D), typical of the early 13th century

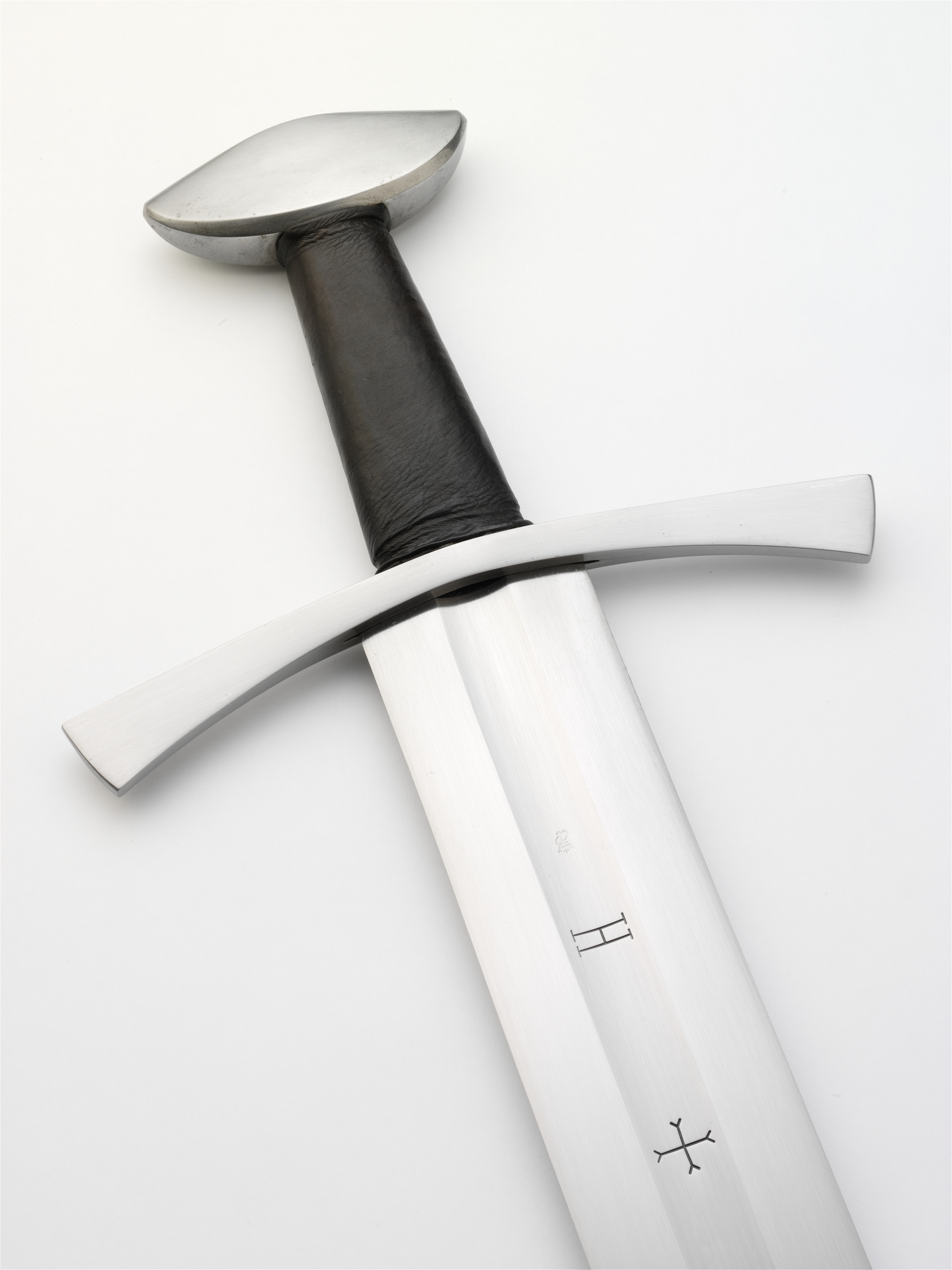
Replica of the "Sword of Saint Maurice" kept in Turin, a type XII sword with "brazil nut" pommel (type A)

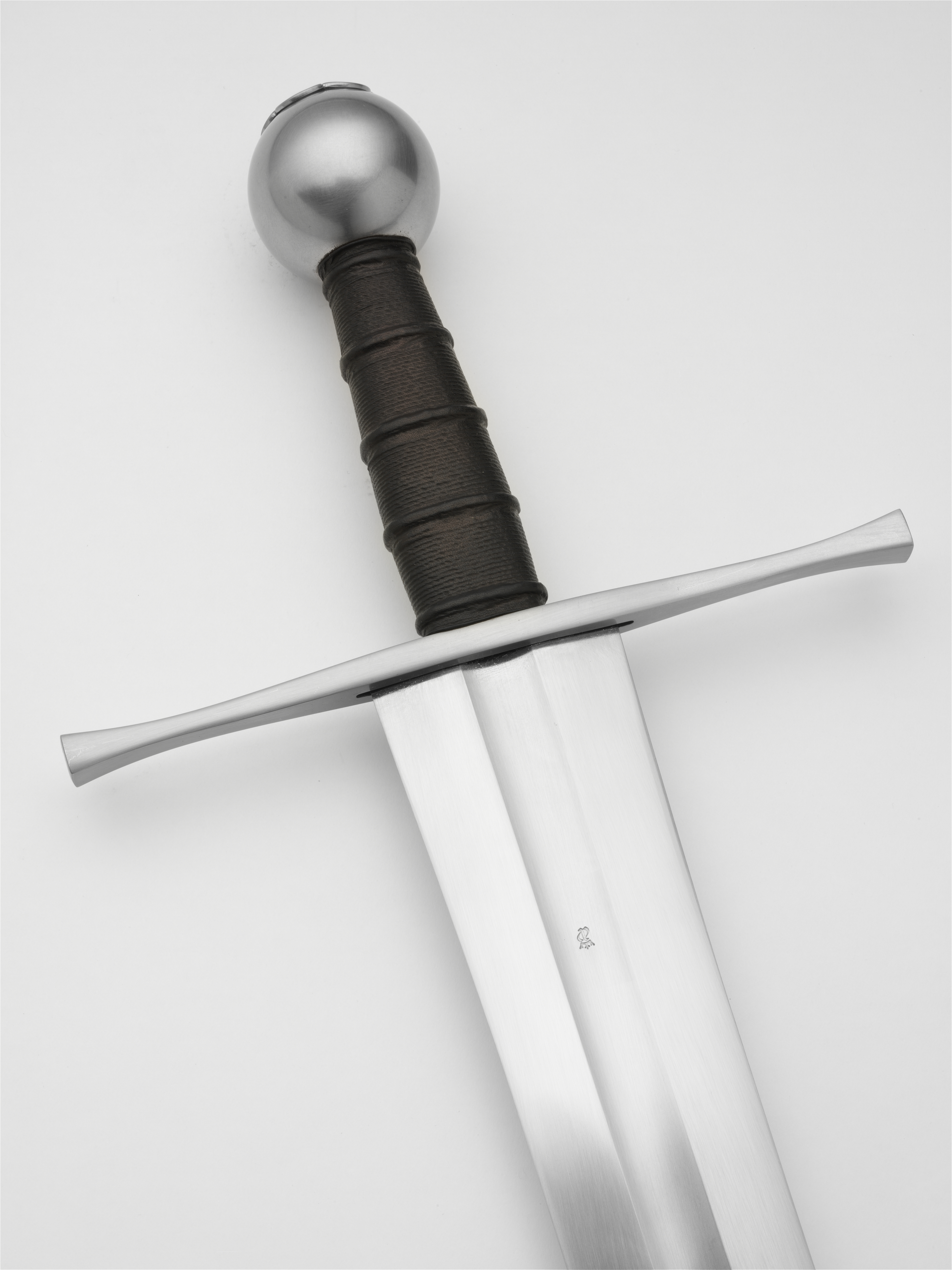
Replica of the "Tritonia" sword (kept at the Museum of Medieval Stockholm, Sweden, dated to c. 1300), a type XIIIb sword with a rare type of spherical pommel (type R)

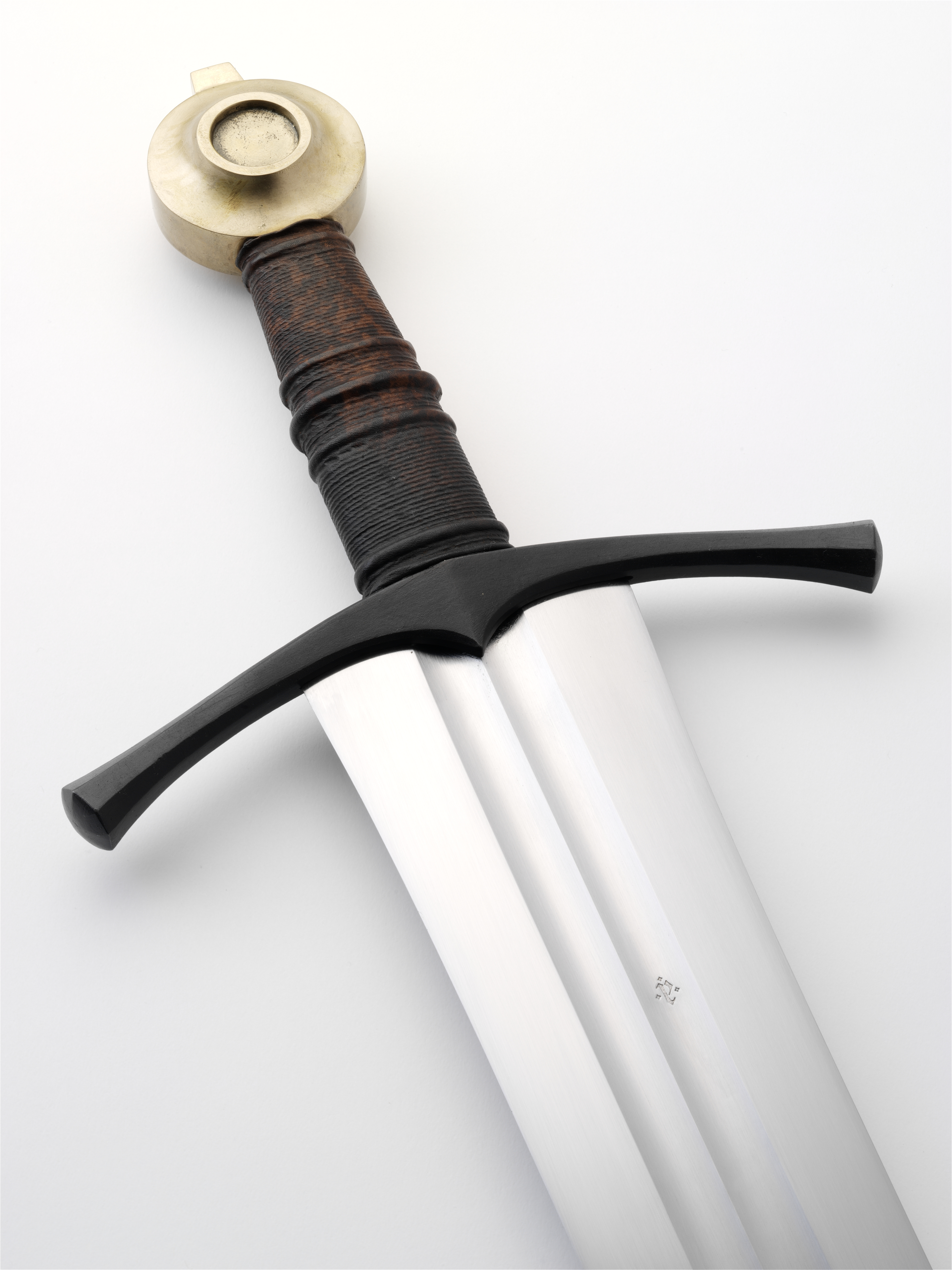
Replica of a type XIV sword with a "wheel" pommel (type J), typical of the period 1270–1340

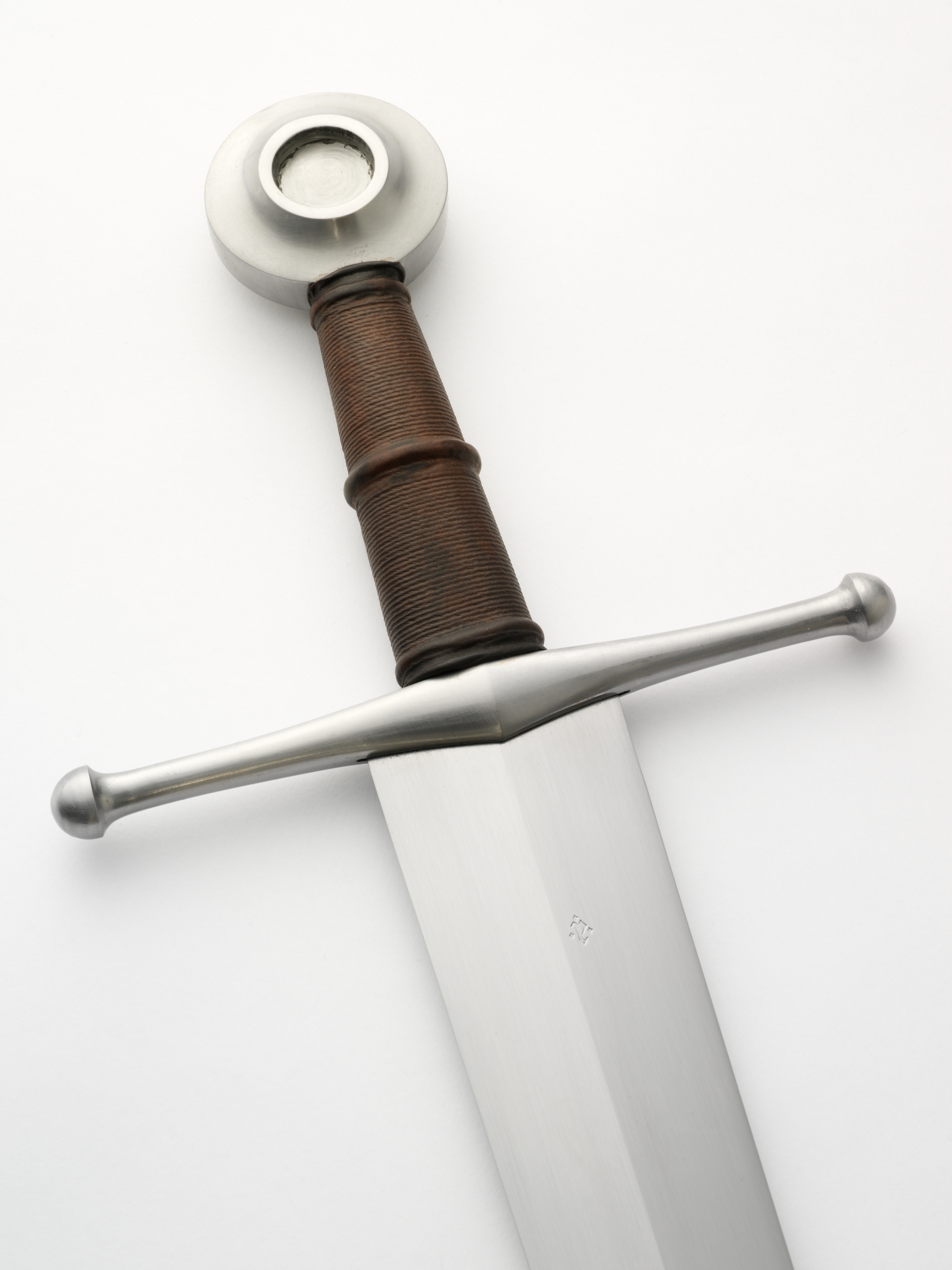
Replica of a type XV sword, typical of the early-to-mid 15th century

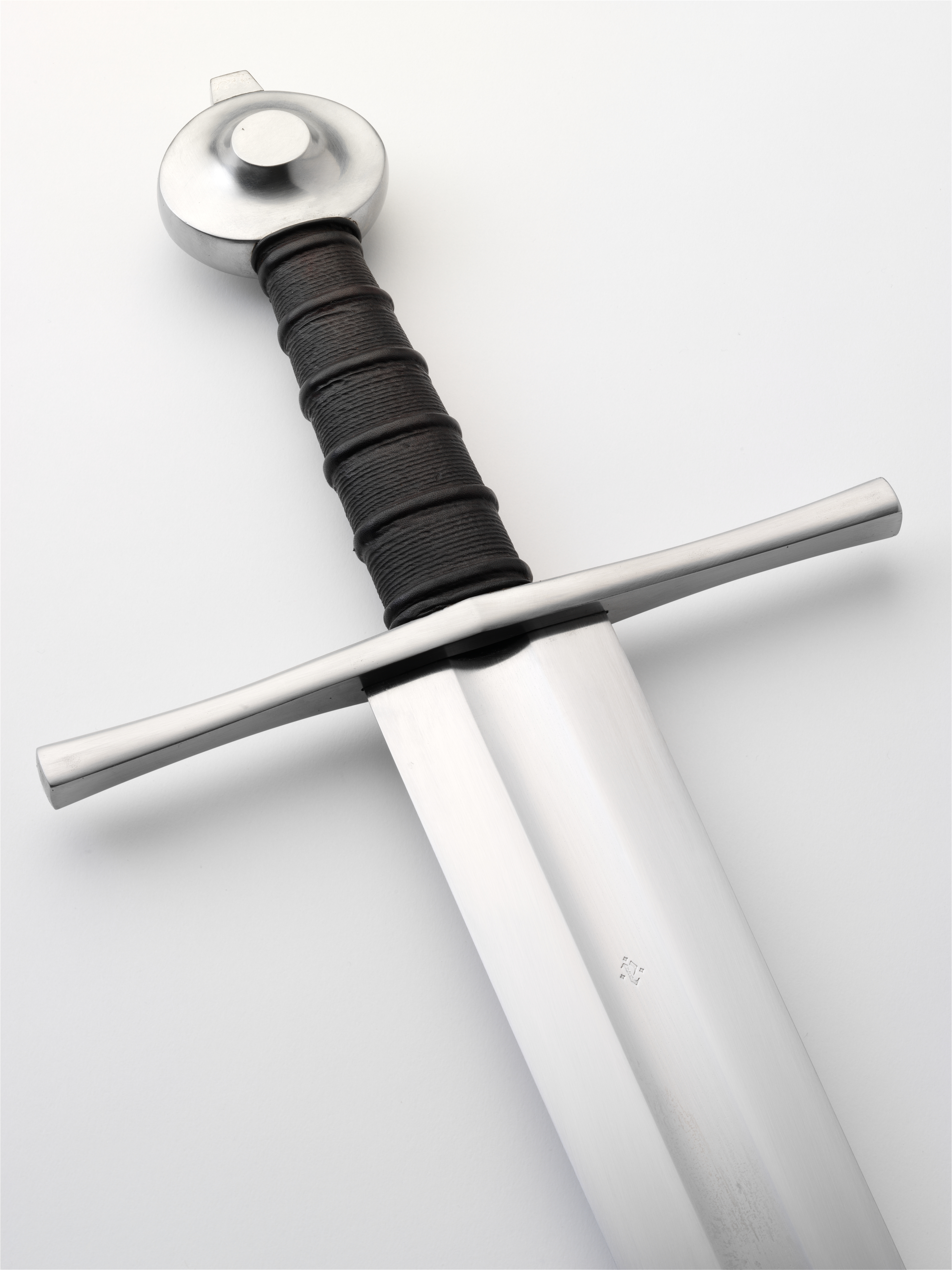
Replica of a type XVI sword (pommel type K) typical of the early-to-mid 14th century

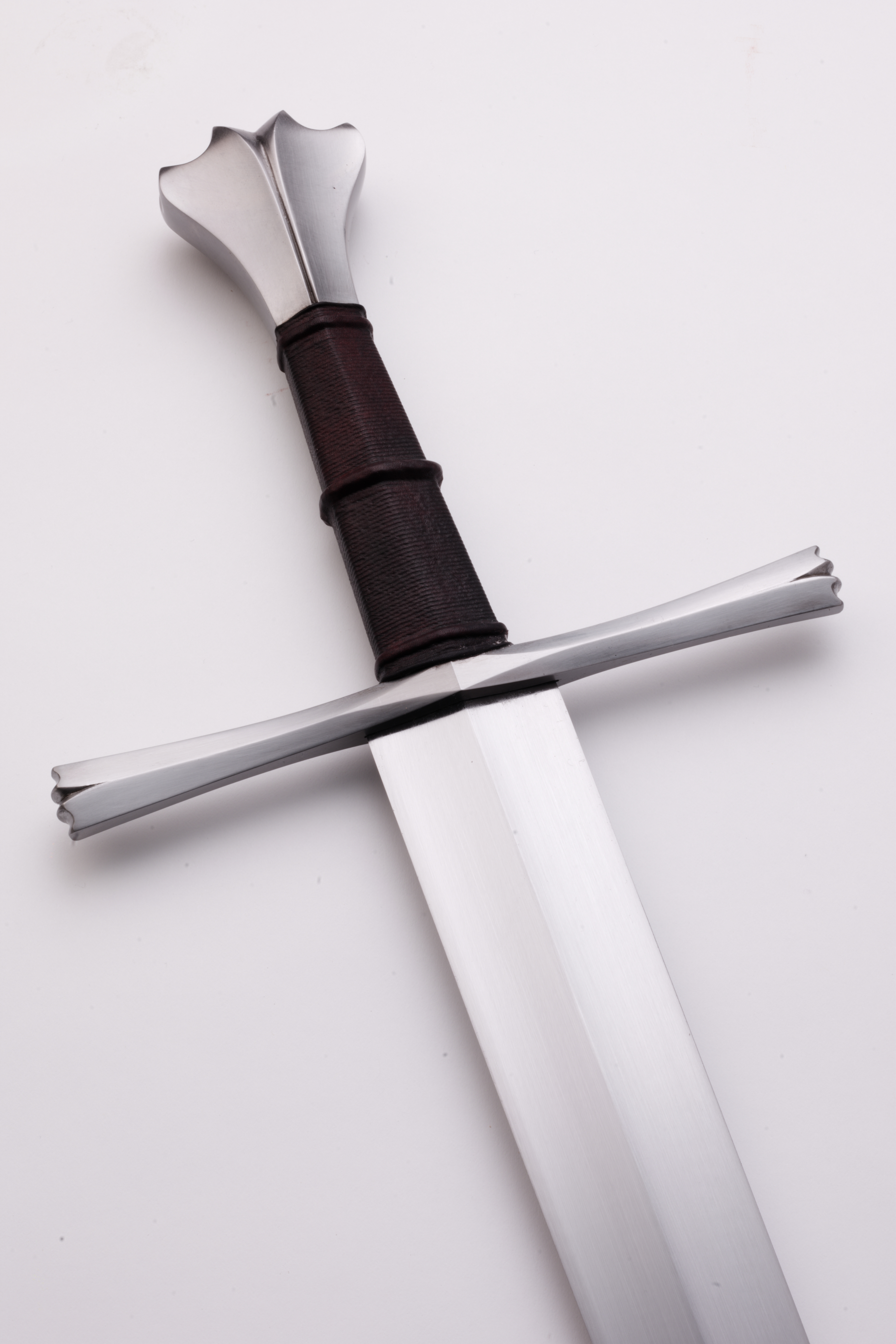
Replica of a type XVIII sword (pommel type V) typical of the late 15th century

=== Pommel ===
Oakeshott's pommel typology groups medieval pommel shapes into 24 categories (some with subtypes). Type A is the "brazil-nut" shape inherited from the various shapes seen on earlier Carolingian swords. Type B includes more rounded forms of A, including the "mushroom" or "tea-cosy" shape. Type C is the "cocked-hat" shape also found in earlier Carolingian swords, with D, E and F derived variants of C.

Type G is the disk-pommel found very frequently in medieval swords. Type H is a variant of the disk pommel, with the edges chamfered off. This is one of the most frequently found shapes throughout the 10th to 15th centuries. I, J and K are derived variants of the disk pommel.

Types L to S are rare shapes, in many cases difficult to date. Type L has a trefoil-like shape; it is possibly limited to Spain in the 12th to 13th centuries. Type M is a special derived variant of the multi-lobed pommel of the Viking Age, found only in a very limited number of swords (see Cawood sword). Types P ("shield-shaped") and Q ("flower-shaped") are not even known to be attested in any surviving sword and known only from period artwork. R is a spherical pommel, known only from a few specimens.

Types T to Z are pommel shapes used in the late medieval period; T is the "fig" or "pear" or "scent-stopper" shape, first used in the early 14th century, but seen with any frequency only after 1360, with numerous derived forms well into the 16th century. U is a "key-shaped" type used only in the second half of the 15th century. V is the "fish-tail" pommel, used in the 15th century. Z is the "cat's head" shape apparently used exclusively in Venice.

== Blade inscriptions ==
Many European sword blades of the high medieval period have blade inscriptions. Inscribed blades were particularly popular during the 12th century. Many of these inscriptions are garbled strings of letters, often apparently inspired by religious formulae, especially the phrase in nomine domini and the word benedictus or benedicat.

The 12th-century fashion for blade inscriptions is based on the earlier, 9th to 11th century, tradition of the so-called Ulfberht swords. A single stray find from Eastern Germany, dated to the late 11th or possibly early 12th century, combines both an Ulfberht and an in nomine domini (in this case, +IINIOMINEDMN) inscription.

Many blade inscriptions of the later 12th and 13th centuries are even more indecipherable, bearing no resemblance to the in nomine domini phrase, sometimes resembling random strings of letters, such as ERTISSDXCNERTISSDX, +NDXOXCHWDRGHDXORVI+,+IHININIhVILPIDHINIhVILPN+ (Pernik sword).

== In media ==
- Knightly swords are used by many characters in The Hobbit and The Lord of the Rings including Aragorn, Gandalf, Eowyn, and Bard the Bowman.
- Peter Pevensie uses a knightly sword given by Father Christmas in The Chronicles of Narnia such as The Lion, the Witch and the Wardrobe, Prince Caspian, and The Last Battle. The version in the film series owns a lion-themed pommel in honour of Aslan, and is used by Edmund on the film version of The Voyage of the Dawn Treader.
- Optimus Prime uses a knightly sword in Transformers: Age of Extinction and Transformers: The Last Knight.

== See also ==
- Types of swords
- Oakeshott typology
- Imperial Sword
- Lobera (sword)
- Szczerbiec
- Norman sword
- Longsword
