= Ingelrii =

Type of medieval european swords

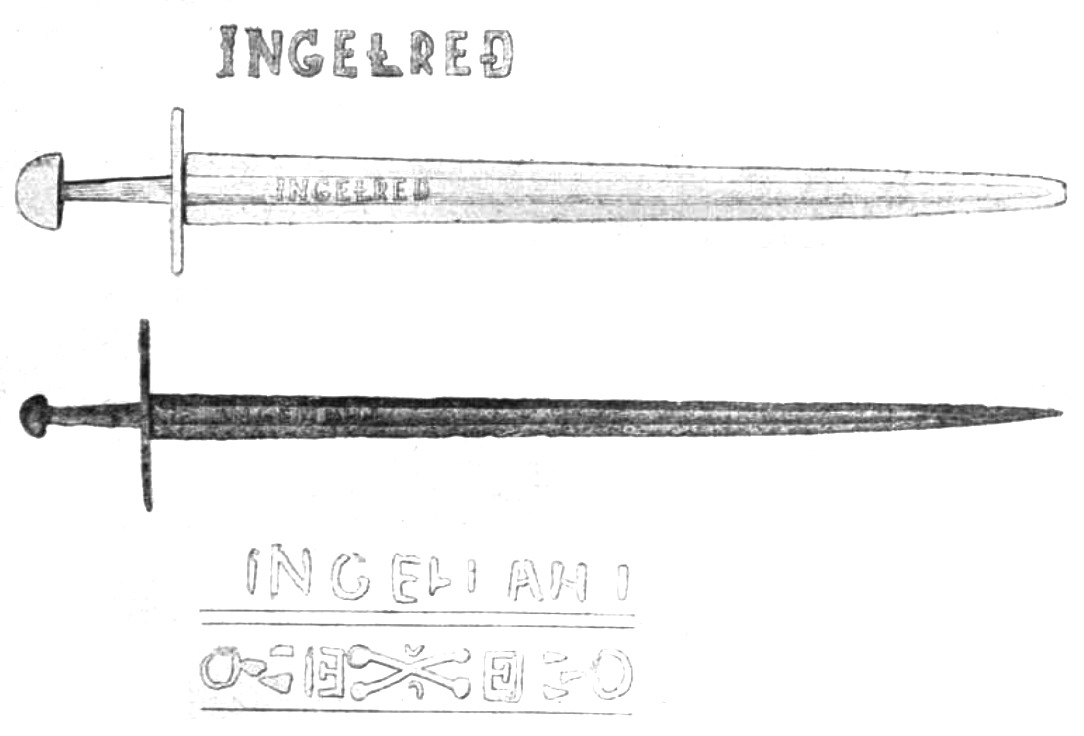
Two Ingelred swords as depicted by Wegeli (1904). Above: 10th-century sword found in Isac river, near Nantes, with an inscription read as INGELRED FIT by Wegeli; below: sword found near Uppsala, Sweden, with inscription INGEL.AH.

The Ingelrii group consists of about 20 known medieval swords from the 10th to 12th century with a damascening blade inscription INGELRII, appearing with several slight spelling variations such as INGELRD and INGELRILT. It is comparable to the older, much better-documented Ulfberht group (9th to 11th century, about 170 known examples).

By 1951, Ewart Oakeshott had originally identified thirteen such swords of this inscription, and had suggested that another, at Wisbech Museum, found in the river bed of the Old Nene in 1895, is also an Ingelrii; supported by Davidson as a possible fourteenth.

Other variations of the inscription have also been found: INGRLRIIMEFECIT on a sword found by Sigridsholm, Sweden, and INGELRIH FECIT on a sword found in Flemma, Norway.

== Known Ingelrii swords ==
- British Museum – Ingelrii, found in the River Thames, along the King's Reach, at Temple
- Wisbech Museum – found at Raven's Willow, Peterborough
- Lower Saxony State Museum, Hanover
- Bavarian National Museum, Munich – found in the Danube near Hilgartsberg
- Swiss National Museum, Zurich — an 11th-century sword found in Marin, Neuchatel
- Sword with +INGELRI+ inscription, and +PREBM+ on the reverse side, pommel of "tea-cosy", length 89.5 cm (blade 75 cm)
- A singular sword with a variant form of the inscription, read as +SINIGELRINIS+, dated mid-10th to mid-11th century, formerly of the Frank Unrath collection (auctioned in 2013)
- Musée Jean-Claude-Boulard, Le Mans (FR)

== See also ==
- Ulfberht swords
- Viking Age arms and armour
