= Migration Period sword =

Migration Period Sword
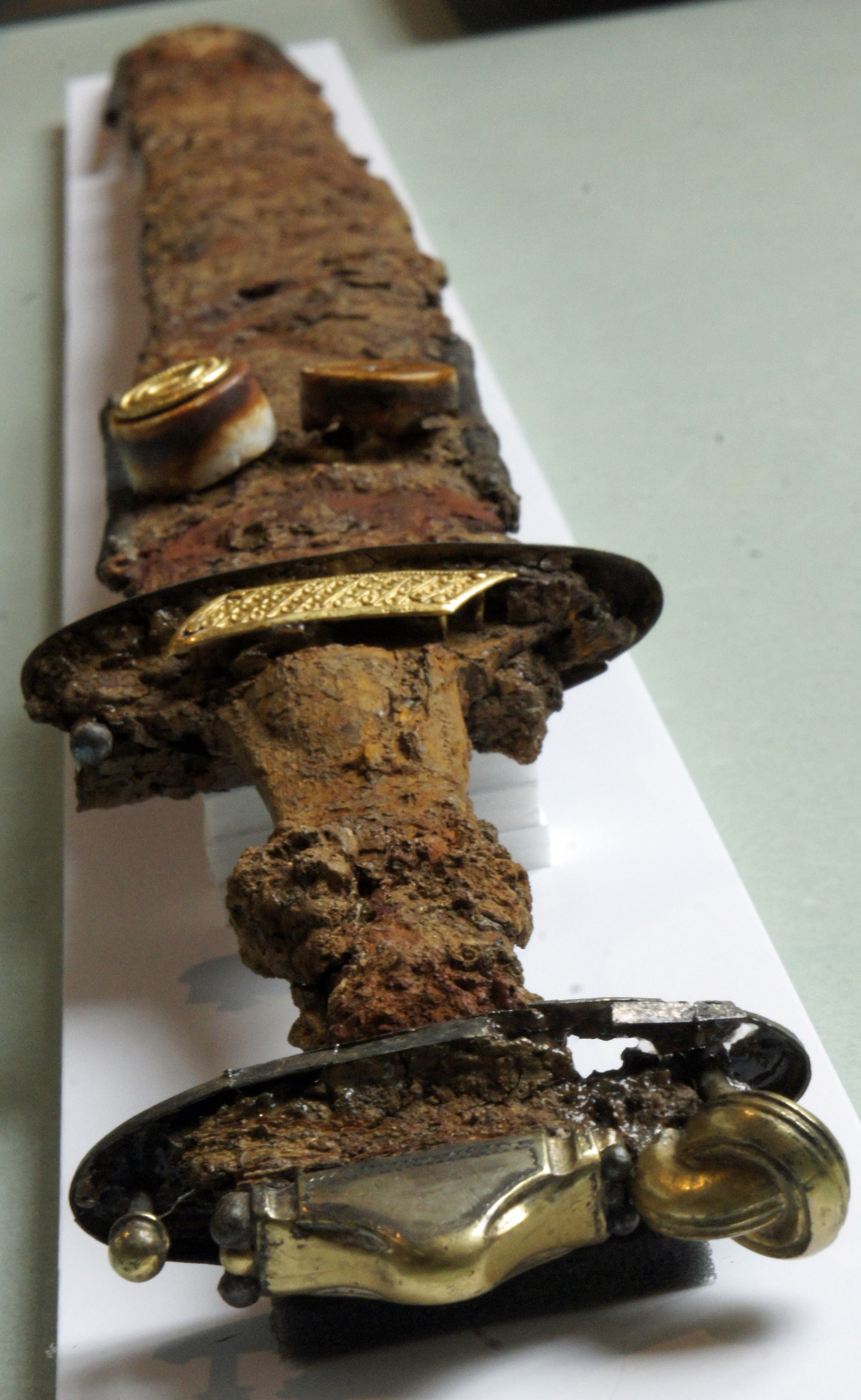
- Germanic type ring sword – France, 6th century
- Type: Sword
- Place of origin: Northwestern Europe

Production history
- Produced: 4th century – 7th century
- Variants: Krefeld type, Alamannic type, Frankish type

Specifications
- Length: c. 70–80 cm (28–31 in) blade
- Blade type: straight, smooth or with shallow fuller, double edged
- Hilt type: short guard, large pommel, ring hilted variants

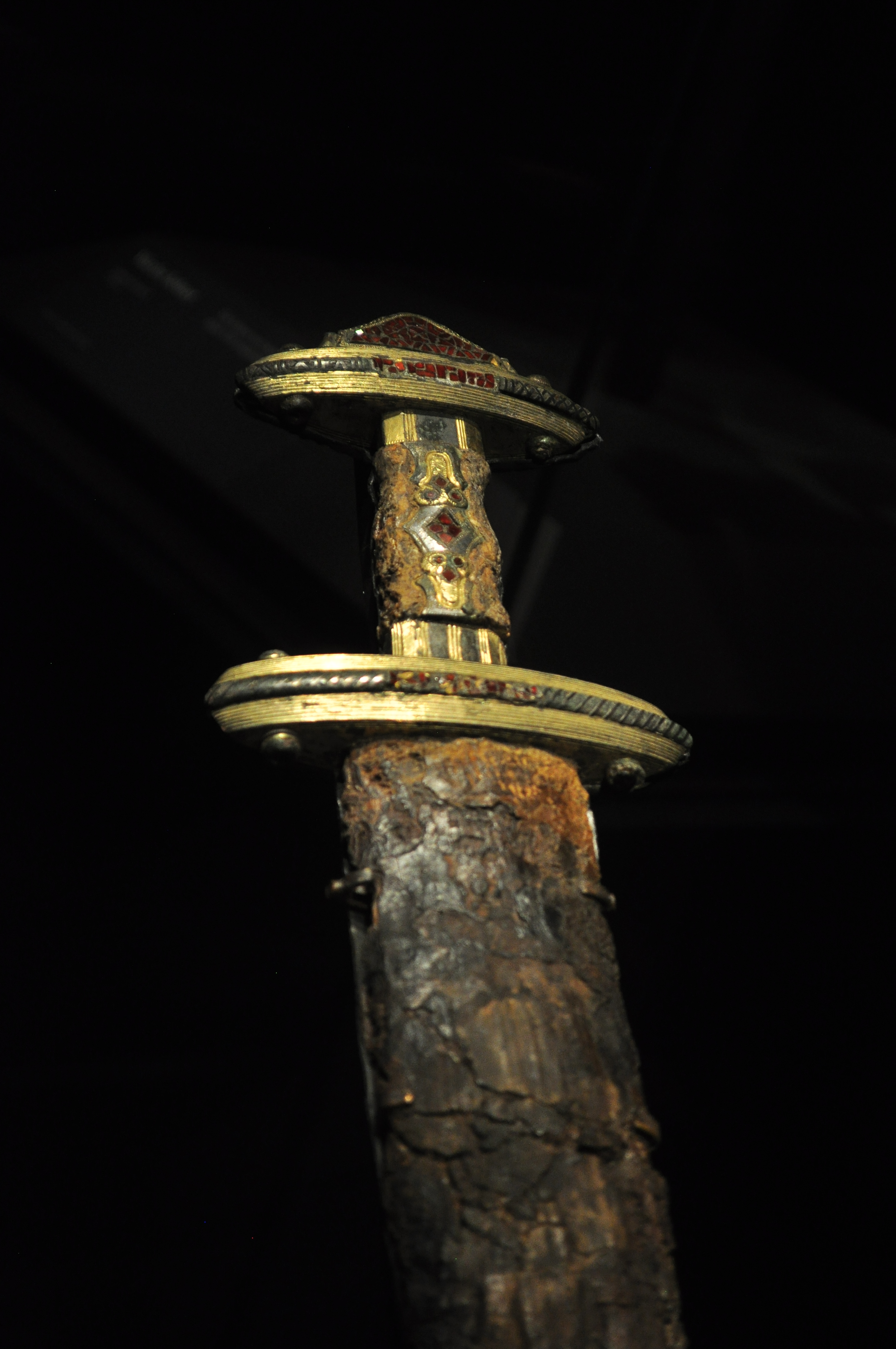
Hilt of a Vendel period sword found at Valsgärde

The Migration Period sword was a type of sword popular during the Migration Period and the Merovingian period of European history (c. 4th to 7th centuries AD), particularly among the Germanic peoples. It later gave rise to the Carolingian or Viking sword type of the 8th to 11th centuries AD.

The blade was normally smooth or showed a very shallow fuller, and often had multiple bands of pattern-welding within the central portion. The handles were often of perishable material and there are few surviving examples. Blade length measured between 28–32 in (710–810 mm) in length and 1.7–2.4 in (43–61 mm) in width. The tang has a length of 4–5 in (100–130 mm) long. The blades show very little taper, usually ending in a rounded tip.

Surviving examples of these Merovingian-period swords have notably been found in the context of the Scandinavian Germanic Iron Age (Vendel period).

== Names and terminology ==
There is no single term that can be reconstructed as having referred specifically to the late Roman spatha in Common Germanic. There are a number of terms and epithets which refer to the sword, especially in Germanic poetry.

- *swerdan "cutting weapon" (whence sword). Beowulf has the compound wægsweord (1489a) referring to a pattern-welded blade (the wæg- "wave" describing the wave-like patterns). A mære maðþumsweord "renowned treasure-sword" (1023a) is given to Beowulf as a reward for his heroism. The same sword is called a guðsweord "battle-sword" later on (2154a)
- heoru (heoro, eor), tentatively associated with the name of Ares (identified with Teiwaz) by Jacob Grimm
- maki (meki, mækir, mece; also hildemece "battle-sword"), found in Gothic as well as in Old English and Old Norse, perhaps related to the Greek μάχαιρα; in any case, Gothic meki in Ephesians 6:17 translates this Greek word. The compound hæftmece in Beowulf, literally "hilt-sword", presumably describes a sword with an exceptionally long hilt. Slavic mьčь is usually regarded as a loan from the Germanic word.

Terms for "blade", "point" or "edge" which pars pro toto (“part for total”) could also refer to the sword as a whole include

- *biljo "splitter, cleaver" (West Germanic only); a bill could be any bladed tool, especially farm implements such as scythes or sickles; the compound guðbill, wigbill, hildebill "battle-blade" refers to the sword, but also the simplex bill is used. Heliand (v. 4882) has billes biti "sword-bite". The Hildebrandslied has a parallelism establishing bill and suert as synonyms (v. 53f. suertu hauwan, bretun mit sinu billiu "[he shall] hew [at me] with [his] sword, lay [me] low with [his] blade").
- *þramja "edge, blade", perhaps Tacitus' framea "spear, lance", but Old Norse þremjar means "edges, sword blades"
- *agjo "edge".
- ord "point"
- *gaizo- meaning "cutter", the normal term for "spear", but in the early period may also have referred to the sword (see Bergakker inscription)

From the testimony of Germanic mythology and the Icelandic sagas, swords could also be given individual names. Examples include the magic sword of Högni, named Dáinnleif after the dwarf Dáinn (Skáldskaparmál), Skofnung and Hviting, two sword-names from the Kormáks saga, Nægling and Hrunting from Beowulf, and Mimung forged by Wayland the Smith.

== Early development ==
=== Roman spatha ===
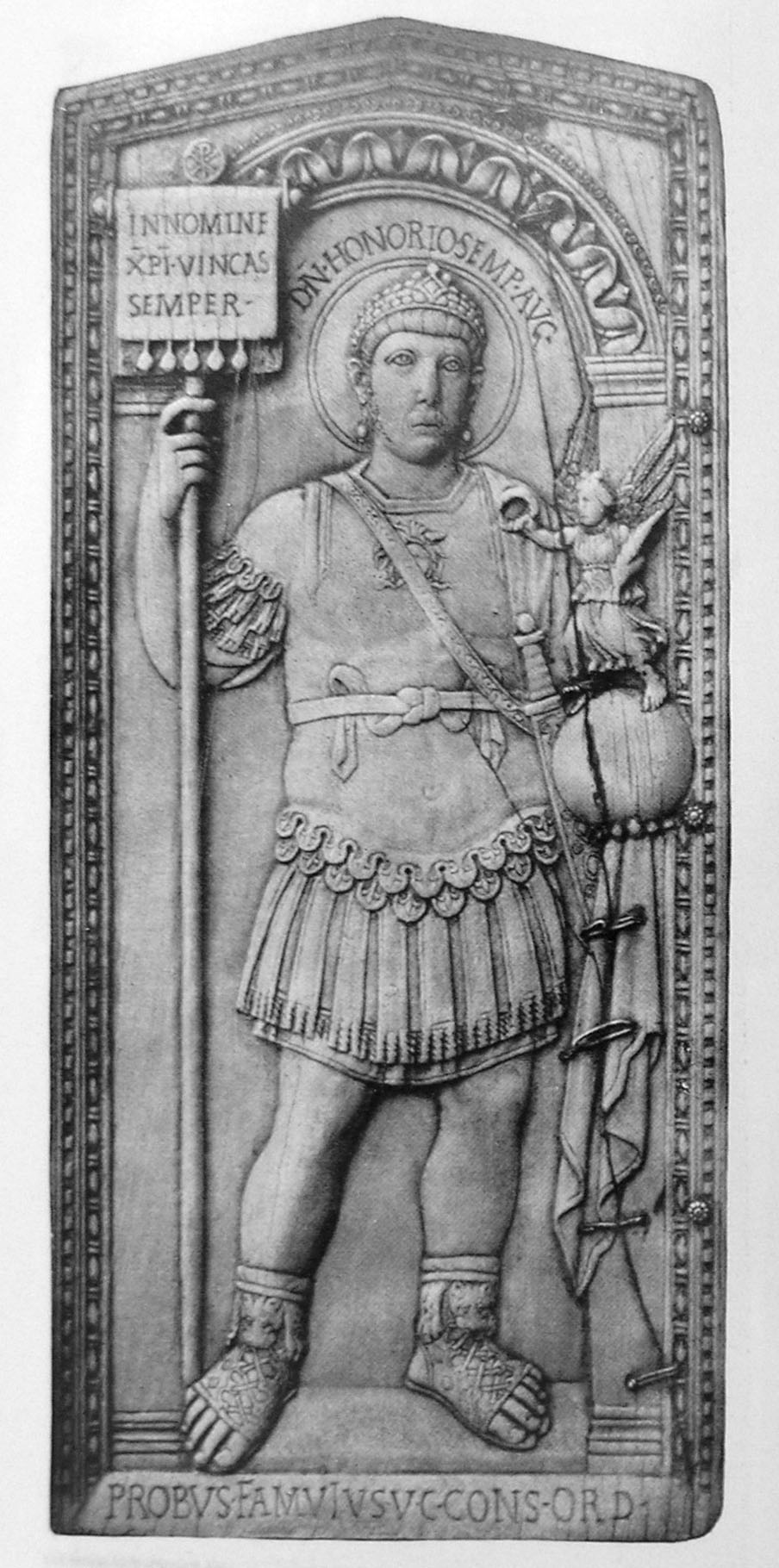
Depiction of a late Roman spatha on a diptych (dated to 406 AD)

The spatha was introduced to the Roman army in the early imperial period by Germanic auxiliaries. The earlier gladius sword was gradually replaced by the spatha from the late 2nd to the 3rd century. From the early 3rd century, legionaries and cavalrymen began to wear their swords on the left side, perhaps because the scutum had been abandoned and the spatha had replaced the gladius.

An early find of Roman spathae in a native Germanic context (as opposed to Roman military camps in Germania) is the deposit of sixty-seven Roman swords in the Vimose bog (3rd century).

The spatha remained in use in the Byzantine Empire and its army. In the Byzantine court, spatharios (σπαθάριος), or "bearer of the spatha", was a mid-level court title. Other variants deriving from it were protospatharios, spatharokandidatos and spatharokoubikoularios, the latter reserved for eunuchs. One of the more famous spatharokandidatoi was Harald Hardrada.

=== Krefeld type ===
An early type of recognizably Germanic sword is the so-called "Krefeld-type" (also Krefeld-Gellep), named for a find in late Roman era military burials at Gelduba castle, Krefeld (Gellep grave 43).

The military burials at Gelduba begin in the late 1st century with the establishment of a Roman camp in Germania Inferior, and they continue without interruption throughout the period of withdrawal of Roman troops and the establishment of early Frankish presence in the mid-5th century.

The Krefeld type spathae appear in graves from approximately the 430s through the 460s. In these graves, the exalted prestige of the sword is not yet fully developed, and some of them are surprisingly poor. They rather seem to still continue the tradition of military graves of the Roman period, of warriors buried with their personal weapon, the presence of a sword perhaps indicating service in the late Roman army.

Six Krefeld type swords are known from Francia, four from Alamannia, and another two from England.

== Merovingian period ==
A native industry producing "Germanic swords" then emerges from the 5th century, contemporary with the collapse of the Western Roman Empire. The Germanic spatha did not replace the native seax, sometimes referred to as gladius or ensis "sword", but technically a single-edged weapon or knife. It rather establishes itself, by the 6th century, at the top of the scale of prestige associated with weapons. While every Germanic warrior grave of the pagan period was furnished with weapons as grave goods, the vast majority of the 6th- to 7th-century graves have a seax and/or a spear, and only the richest have swords.

Swords could often become important heirlooms. Æthelstan Ætheling, son of king Æthelred, in a will of c. 1015 bequeathed to his brother Eadmund the sword of king Offa (died 796), which at that time must have been over 200 years old.

=== Gold hilt spatha ===
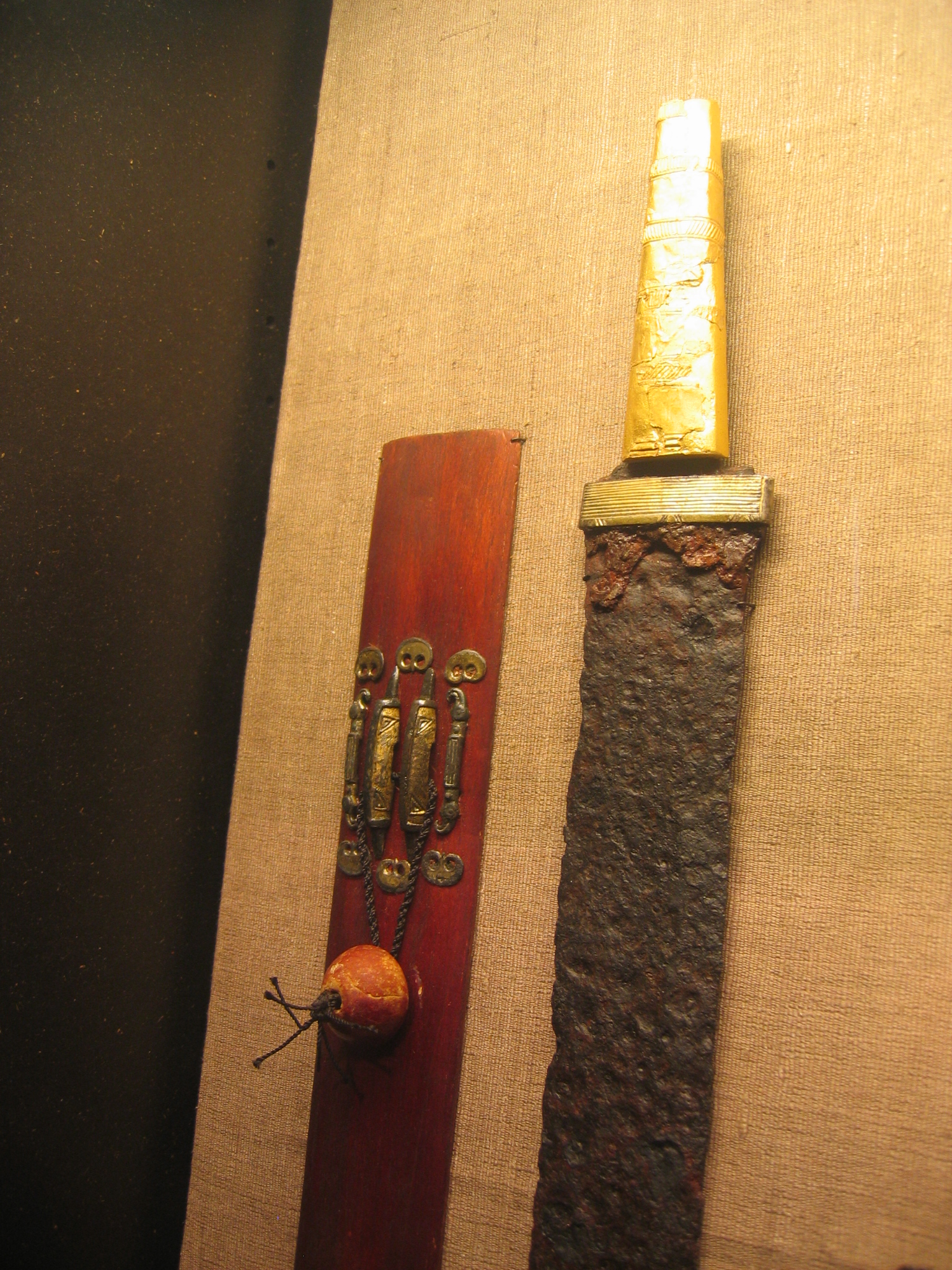
5th-century Alamannic gold hilt spatha found at Villingendorf

The gold hilt spatha was a very rare and prestigious type of sword in the later 5th century. Specimens are known mostly from Alemannia (Pleidelsheim, Villingendorf), but also as far afield as Moravia (Blučina).

An "Alamannic type" is distinguished from a "Franconian type" based on scabbard mounts and hilt design by Quast (1993). A total of 20 examples are known, ten of each type.

One of the "Franconian" examples is the sword of Childeric I (died 481), recovered from his tomb at Tournai. Some authors have suggested that Childeric's sword was a "ceremonial sword" not intended for combat, perhaps produced for the occasion of his burial.

=== Ring-sword ===
The ring-sword (also ring-spatha, ring-hilt spatha) is a particular variant of the Germanic migration period swords. Ring-swords are characterized by a small ring fixed to the hilt (not to be confused are Late Medieval to Renaissance Irish swords with ring-shaped pommels, also known as "ring-swords").

Ring-swords came into fashion in the last phase of the Migration period (or the beginning of the Early Middle Ages, in the 6th and 7th centuries. They were found in Vendel era Scandinavia, Finland and in Anglo-Saxon England as well as on the Continent (Saxony, Francia, Alemannia, Langobardia). These swords were prestigious, prized possessions, probably reserved for kings and high nobility. The ring is interpreted as a symbolic "oath ring".

The design appears to have originated in the late 5th century, possibly with the early Merovingians, and quickly spread to England (from the earliest phase of Anglo-Saxon presence) and Scandinavia. The Beowulf poem uses the term hring-mæl, literally "ring-sword" or "ring-ornament", and scholars who interpret this as referring to this type of sword can point to it as one indication that the Beowulf poet was still drawing from an unbroken tradition of the pagan period, as ring-swords disappeared from the archaeological record with Christianization, by the late 7th century. Some 80 examples of ring-hilted swords have been found in Europe, 14 of those in Finland. First phase swords with a loose ring have only been found in Kent, England, whereas second phase is prevalent on the continent, especially in France but also in Sweden, Finland (six examples) and Italy.

Examples include:

- Continent
  - the Beckum ring-sword, dated c. AD 475–525, found at Beckum, Germany
  - Wünnenberg-Fürstenberg, grave 61, 6th century
  - the Schretzheim sword, found in tomb 78 in the Schretzheim Alemannic cemetery, Dillingen, Bavaria, dated to between 580 and 620 AD. The sword is a rare example of a blade inscribed with an Elder Futhark inscription, four runes arranged so that the staves form a cross shape.
- England
  - the Kent (or Dover) ring-sword
  - Sutton Hoo ring-sword
  - the Chessel Down II (Isle of Wight) ring-sword), early 6th century
  - Staffordshire Hoard k543, a silver sword ring fitting of fixed type, among the treasure found near Hammerwich, Staffordshire. Thought to be associated with one of the older pommel-caps in the hoard, the piece has been dated to the early 6th century. Pommel-cap k711 also displays characteristic damage caused by the installation and later removal of a ring fitting in antiquity, like the pommel-cap from the Snösbäck ritual deposit in Västergötland.
- Scandinavia
  - the Snartemo sword, Snartemosverdet, found 1933 in tomb 5 at Snartemo, Vest-Agder, Norway, dated to c. 500 AD.
  - Vendel ring-sword, found at Vendel, Uppland, Sweden, 6th century.
  - the Vallstenarum sword, found in Gotland, provides an important indication of the spread of the fashion. The sword was made in the early 6th century, and a ring was added only later, around 600 AD, damaging part of the existing hilt decoration.
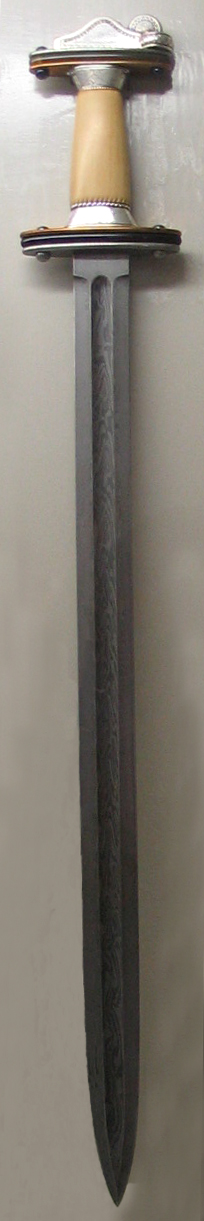
Replica of a Lombard ring-sword, Civico Museo Archeologico di Bergamo

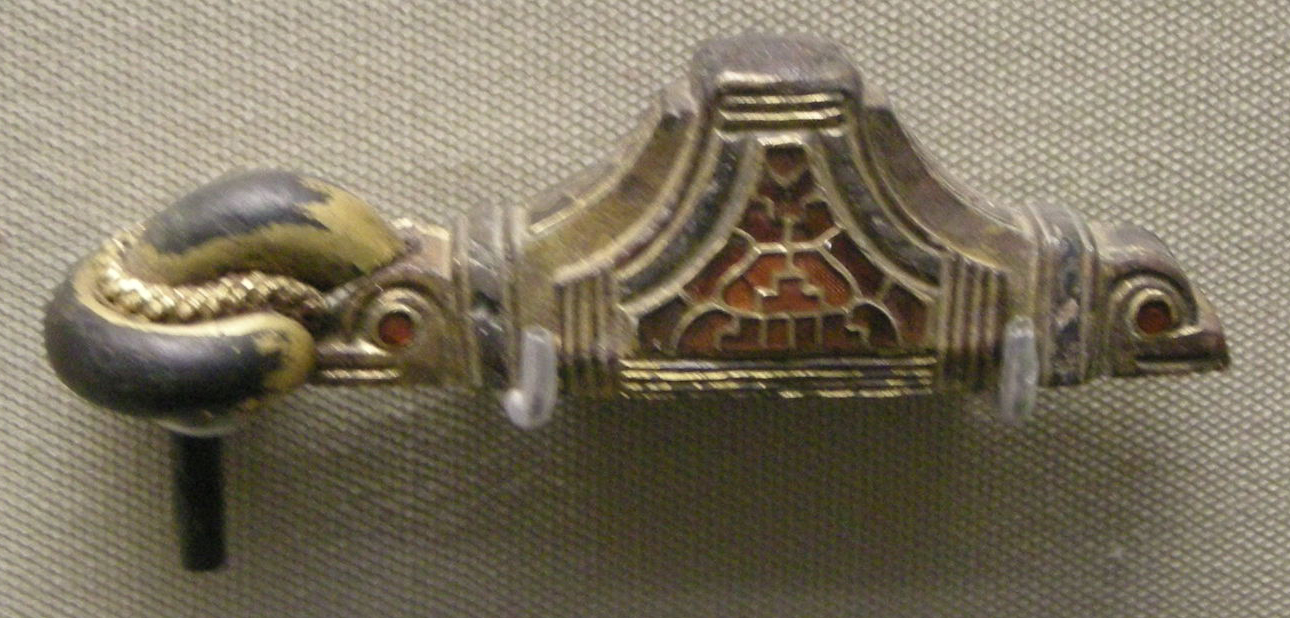
Lombard art, sword pommel, 6th–7th century

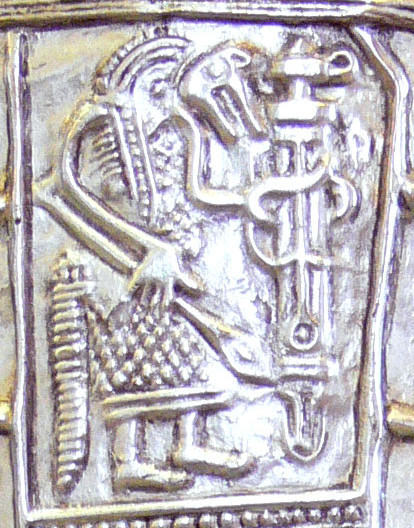
The 7th-century Gutenstein scabbard, found near Sigmaringen, Baden-Württemberg, Germany shows a warrior in wolf costume holding a ring-sword

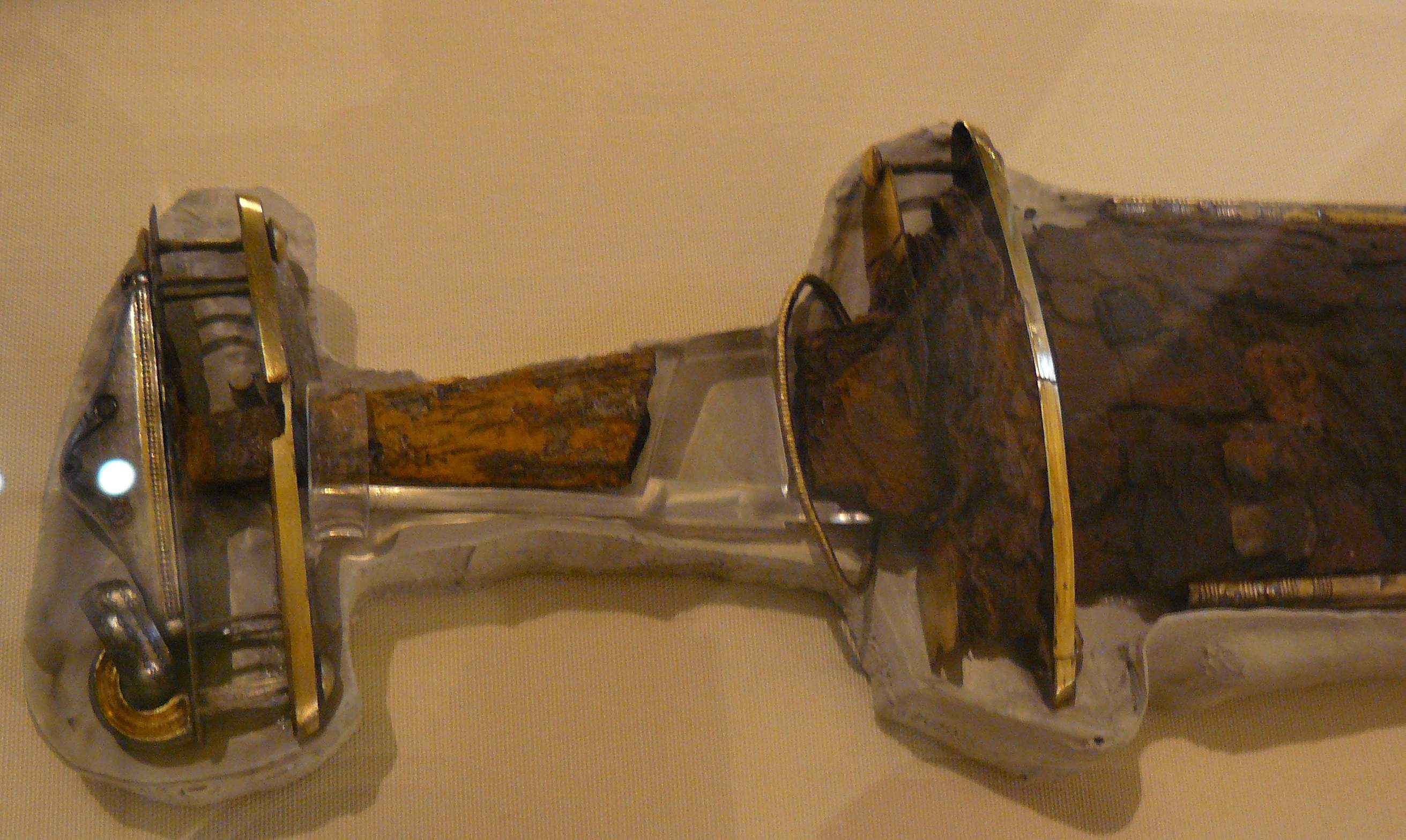
Anglo Saxon ring sword (6th century)

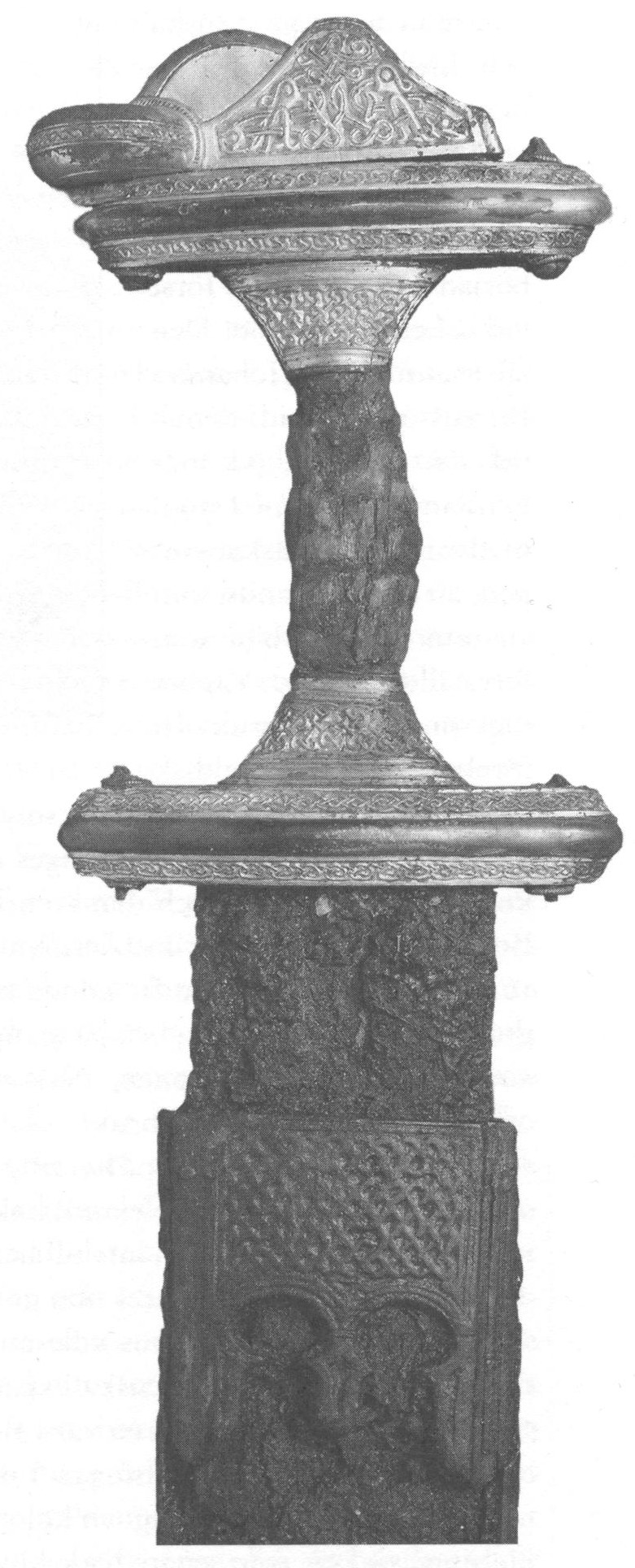
Finnish ring sword (7th century) from Pappilanmäki, Eura

== Transition to the Carolingian sword ==
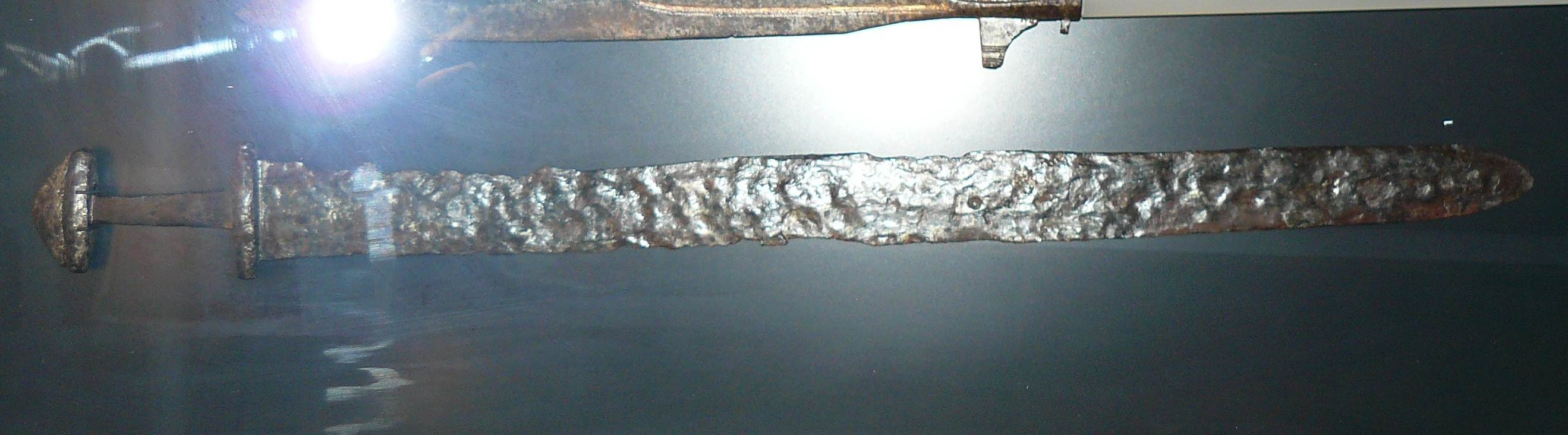
Frankish sword (8th century)

In the 8th century, Frankish sword smiths increasingly gained access to high quality steel imported from Central Asia, where a crucible steel industry began to establish itself. The earliest types of "Viking swords" according to the typology of Petersen (1919) are dated to the second half of the 8th century, while the "Viking sword" proper (and notably the Ulfberht type) emerges by the turn of the 9th century.

== See also ==
- Iron Age sword
- Migration period spear
- Gothic and Vandal warfare
- Anglo-Saxon warfare
- Viking Age arms and armour
