= Gothic and Vandal warfare =

The Goths, Gepids, Vandals, and Burgundians were East Germanic groups who appear in Roman records in late antiquity. At times these groups warred against or allied with the Roman Empire, the Huns, and various Germanic tribes.

The size and social composition of their armies remains controversial.

== History ==
In the 3rd century, some Germanic people of the Baltic Sea (associated with the Wielbark culture) followed the Vistula, Bug, and Dnestr rivers and settled among the Dacians, Sarmatians, Bastarnae, and other peoples of the Black Sea steppes. These Germanic people brought their name and language to the Gothic people who emerged in the 3rd century (associated with the Chernyakhov Culture).

At the same time, other Germanic people of the Baltic Sea (associated with the Przeworsk culture) followed other trade routes to the middle-Danubian plains (Vandals) or the Main river (Burgundians).

Horse nomads with bow-armed cavalry armies, including the Sarmatians (or Iazyges, Roxolanni, Taifali, and Alans) had long ruled the plains north of the Danube and the steppes north of the Black Sea (since about 1200 BC). (The Goths and Vandals were mainly farmers with infantry armies). In some areas, the Sarmatians, Taifali, and Alans preserved their dominance until the Huns arrived.

The Gothic people had divided into two or more groups by the end of the 3rd century. These groups lasted from the late 3rd century to the late 4th century. The Thervingi lived between the Danube and the Carpathians west of the Dniester River; the Greuthungi, and possibly other groups, lived east of the Dniester River.

Jordanes, a mid 6th-century historian, describes a large Greuthung kingdom in the late 4th century, but Ammianus Marcellinus, a late 4th-century historian, does not record this. Many modern historians, including Peter Heather and Michael Kulikowski, doubt that it was ever particularly extensive (and suggest one or more smaller kingdoms).

== Troop types ==
Gothic armies were primarily composed of heavy infantry equipped with a shield, spatha or scramasax and the occasional francisca and pike formed in wedge formation, with a supporting heavy cavalry force equipped with lance and sword. Although Goths were the first of the Germanic tribes to place more honour in fighting on horse than on foot, equipping cavalrymen was expensive and infantry remained the larger force. Visigoths had fewer cavalry, Ostrogoths had more cavalry than the Roman army, while Vandals were dominated by cavalry.

Cavalry mainly took the form of heavy, close combat cavalry armed with sword and lance. Goths and likely Vandals as well favoured a long heavy lance of Sarmatian origin, the contus, which stood at 3.74m long. The Goths also recruited mounted archers from the Alans and Sarmatians, and light sword cavalry from the Heruli and Taifali, although all of these also fielded lancers. For a Gothic or Vandal nobleman the most common form of armour was a mail shirt, often reaching down to the knees, and an iron or steel helmet, often in a Roman Ridge helm style. Some of the wealthiest warriors may have a worn a lamellar cuirass over mail, and splinted greaves and vambraces on the forearms and forelegs.

=== Realms in the Roman Empire ===
This Gothic society faced internal strife and Hunnish attacks in the late 4th century. As a result, several groups sought refuge in the Roman Empire; two of the more successful groups, the Thervings and Greuthungs, absorbed smaller groups and gained independence within the Roman Empire. Another group, the Crimean Goths, survived on the Black Sea. The Vandals and Burgundians shared similar histories.

The Visigothic and Burgundian kingdoms in Gaul fell to Clovis' Frankish invasions in the early 6th century; the Vandal kingdom in north Africa and the Ostrogothic kingdom in Italy and Illyria fell to Justinian I's Byzantine invasions by the mid 6th century. The Visigothic kingdom in Hispania survived (despite losing most of their old Gallic territory) until the Islamic conquest of Hispania in the early 8th century.

== Gothic society and forces in the 3rd and 4th centuries ==
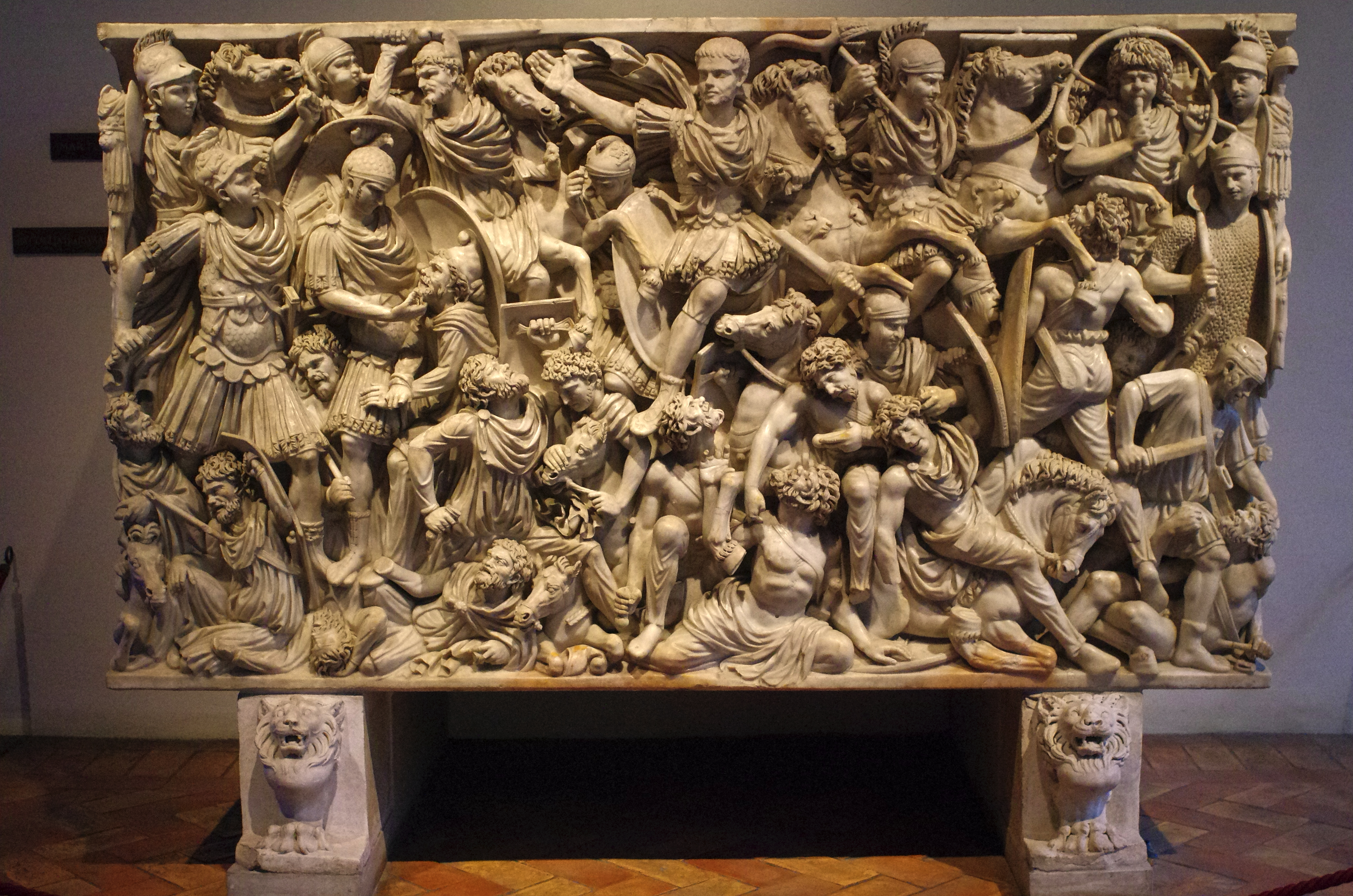
Roman relief panel on the Ludovisi Battle sarcophagus depicting a battle between Goths and Romans, circa 260.

The Gothic tribes did not have long-term standing armies but relied on short-term levies or volunteers. Most would return to their farms after some time. Most came on foot and fought as infantry, though some brought horses and fought as cavalry. Like their Roman opponents, most soldiers had thrusting spears, throwing spears, and shields, though swords and bows were also used. Unlike their Roman opponents, few could afford metal armor.

Major wars:
- Gothic raid on Histria (238)
- Gothic raid on Marcianople (249)
- Cniva's Gothic raid on Philippopolis (250–251)
- Seaborne raids on the Balkans (c. 252)
- Seaborne raids on Asia Minor (c. 256)
- Seaborne raid on the Aegean (c. 268)
- Gothic raids on the Balkans (c. 270)
- Aurelian's Roman raids north of the Danube (c. 271)
- Gothic raids on Asia Minor (c. 275)
- Gothic (?) raids in the Balkans (c. 330?)
- Constantine II's Roman invasion north of the Danube (332)
- Julian's Roman invasion of Persia (363) (?)
- Roman Civil War between Procopius and Valens (365)
- Valens' raids on the Thervings (367–369)
- Hunnic raids on the Greuthungs (c. 370)
- Hunnic raids on the Thervings (c. 376)
- Gothic revolt in the Balkans (c. 376–382)
- Gothic Civil War between Fritigern & Athanaric (?)
- Odotheus' crossing of the Danube (?)

Notable battles:
- Abrittus (251)
- Naissus (268)
- Marcianople (376/77)
- Ad Salices (377)
- Adrianople (378)

=== Difference of scale ===
The 3rd- and 4th-century Gothic tribes could not match the population or extent of the Roman Empire. The 4th-century Thervingi settled over about 100,000 km^{2} between the Carpathian mountains, Olt river, Danube river, and Pruth river. (The Eastern Roman Empire held about 1,500,000 km^{2} in round numbers). The destruction of one Gothic army would leave its tribe vulnerable to Roman attacks; the destruction of one Roman army could be countered by other Roman armies moving into the war zone (as happened after Adrianople). Therefore, 3rd- and 4th-century Gothic armies could not take as many risks as Roman armies could.

=== Defending Gothic settlements (on the steppe) ===
The Gothic people generally settled in unwalled farming settlements along the main rivers. These settlements were vulnerable to Roman, Hunnish, or other attacks, even by small raiding parties.

Valens and the Roman army invaded Therving lands in 367 and 369. Athanaric and his supporters avoided battle; his army abandoned the Danubian plains and retreated into the Carpathian Mountains. The Goths could not defeat the Romans in battle and defend their homes.

Alan and Hunnic raiders attacked various Gothic lands in the 370s; they attacked Therving lands c. 375. Athanaric and his supporters sought battle; the main Gothic army assembled on the Dnestr river, with forward units scouted 30 km ahead. The Hunnic raiders avoided the scouts and attacked the main army at night.

=== Attacking Roman territory (by land) ===
The Roman Empire fortified most of its cities and frontier garrisons in the 3rd and 4th centuries. Fortified settlements were relatively safe from Gothic attacks.

Gothic attackers could choose unfortified targets; these included many cities in the 3rd century, but were generally restricted to smaller towns and villae by the 4th century, as more cities were fortified. Alternatively, they could attack fortified targets, relying on surprise, on treachery, or on siege warfare.

=== Attacking Roman territory (by sea) ===
In the 3rd century, several Gothic campaigns went by sea. In the 4th century, few, if any, Gothic campaigns went by sea.

=== Revolts ===
As soon as large Gothic groups settled on Roman territory, they faced military conflicts with the Roman government (as in the Gothic War (376–382)).

== Gothic and Vandal forces in the Late Roman army ==
The Late Roman army (or East Roman army for the east) often recruited non-Roman soldiers into regular military units, as well as separate allied contingents (of laeti and foederati). Most soldiers were probably Romans, many were probably non-Roman.

Notable battles:
- Frigidus River (394)

== Germanic forces in the Hunnic army ==
By the early 5th century, Hunnic elites established their hegemony in Eastern and Central Europe by subduing or dislodging the local elites. The Hunnic rulers had thus an empire at their disposal with the resources of subject people who were required to supply additional forces for their ongoing raids and conquests. The most memorable of their rulers became Attila, who eventually challenged the Roman Empire for supremacy.

After the death of Attila, one of his subject rulers, Ardaric, waged a successful civil war against the heirs of Attila, helping several tribes to break apart and regain their independence.

Notable battles:
- Chalons (451)
- Nedao River (454)

== Visigothic armies (396–507) ==
During the Gothic revolt of 376, a mixed Gothic group settled in Moesia. By the 390s Alaric had become the client king of the Visigoths under the Roman Empire.

Between 395 and 418, Alaric, Athawulf, and their immediate successors fought several campaigns, seeking offices for themselves and support for their followers. They transferred their base of operations from the eastern Balkans (395) to the western Balkans (397), Italy (408), and Aquitaine (c. 415).

These successive movements may have divided the army from much of its population base.

Notable wars:
- Revolt of Alaric I
- Gothic War (401–403)
- Gothic War (436–439)
- Chalons (451)
- First Franco-Visigothic war (496–498)

== Visigothic armies (507–711) ==
Notable wars:
- Franco–Gothic War (507–511)
- Guadalete (711)

== Vandal armies (406–534) ==
Notable battles:
- Sack of Rome (455)
- Ad Decimum (533)
- Tricameron (533)

== Ostrogothic armies (489–553) ==
Ostrogothic armies may have had the same organizational structure (with separate field armies and frontier armies) as contemporary Byzantine armies.

Ostrogothic Italy, like the Late Roman Empire, fortified its cities and military bases.

The Italian-Ostrogothic army, like the Late Roman and Byzantine army, could transport food and other military supplies from secure areas to war zones. This allowed the Ostrogothic army to assemble more troops in one place (than earlier Gothic armies) without consuming as much of the local food supply.

Notable battles:
- Isonzo (489)
- Verona (489)
- Faventia (542)
- Taginae (552)
- Mons Lactarius (553)

== Weapons and armor ==
There is little direct evidence for Gothic military equipment. There is more evidence for Vandal, Roman, and West Germanic military equipment, which provides the base for inferences about Gothic military equipment.

=== Germanic and Roman weapons and armor ===
Generally speaking, there was little difference between well-armed Germanic and Roman soldiers; furthermore, many Germanic soldiers served in the Roman forces. The Roman army was better able to equip its soldiers than the Germanic armies.

Late Roman representational evidence, including propaganda monuments, gravestones, tombs, and the Exodus fresco, often shows Late Roman soldiers with one or two spears; one tombstone shows a soldier with five shorter javelins. Archaeological evidence, from Roman burials and Scandinavian bog-deposits, shows similar spearheads, though the shafts are rarely preserved.

Aside from the traditional mail and scale armour of Roman armies, it also known from archaeological finds that the Goths and Vandals commonly used lamellar armour. Constructed of overlapping metal plates laced together, lamellar was more rigid than mail or scale armour and offered considerably greater protection against blunt force trauma from weapons such as maces or axes, commonly used by heavy cavalry of the time.

Late Roman representational evidence sometimes still shows Roman swords. Archaeological evidence shows that the gladius has disappeared; various short semispathae supplement the older pugiones while medium-long spathae replace the medium-short gladii. These have the same straight double-edged blades as older Roman swords.

Representational evidence and recovered laths, as well as arrowheads and bracers, show Roman use of composite bows.

Representational evidence, recovered bosses, and some complete shields from Dara, show that most Roman infantry and some Roman cavalry carried shields.

Although the representational evidence, including gravestones and tombs, usually shows soldiers without armor, the archaeological evidence includes remains of scale armor, mail armor, and helmets.

=== Experimental evidence ===
Modern blacksmiths, reenactors, and experimental archaeologists can duplicate Roman Age weapons and armor with Roman Age technology.

Basic spearheads (including javelinheads) take about three hours of forging time, while swords can take about 37 hours without pattern welding, or about 110 hours with pattern welding (divided over several days or weeks of labor).

Mail armor takes well over 600 hours of forging time.

== Military terminology ==
Via Wulfila's bible translation we do know 4th-century Gothic military terms he used to describe the 1st-century Roman army. These terms reflect the Gothic military organization that grew from its Germanic roots under Roman and Central Asian (Hunnic) influence.

- Drauhtinon ("to war")

=== Individuals ===
- Gadrauhts ("soldier, militiaman")
- Hundafaþs (used to describe a Roman centurion) Common Germanic organization of troops of a hundred armed men (in the Scandinavian leidang it could refer to less than a hundred or several hundred organized and armed men), literally meaning 'group of a hundred'

=== Units (by size) ===
- Harjis ("army")
- Hansa (used to describe a Roman cohort) In Germanic terms meaning a band (of warriors); a related term is the later used German: Hanse, Dutch: Hanze, Estonian: hansa, Polish: Hanza, Swedish: Hansan for the Hanseatic League

=== Weapons ===
- Hairus ("sword")

== See also ==
- Migration period sword
- Viking Age arms and armour
- Anglo-Saxon warfare
- Celtic warfare
- Military of Carthage
- Dacian warfare
- Viking raid warfare and tactics
- Anglo-Saxon military organization
- Migration period spear

== Bibliography ==
- Hugh Elton, Warfare in Roman Europe, AD 350–425, Oxford: Clarendon, 1996 ISBN 0198152418
- Peter Heather and John Matthews, The Goths in the Fourth Century, Liverpool: Liverpool University Press, 1991 ISBN 0853234264
- Ammianus Marcellinus, Historiae, book 27, unknown publisher, unknown year
- Joseph Wright, A Primer of the Gothic Language, with Grammar, Notes, and Glossary. Oxford: Clarendon Press, 1892 ISBN 1402149719
- William Bennett, An Introduction to the Gothic Language, New York: Modern Language Association, 1980 ISBN 0873522958
