= Gēr =

Gēr may refer to:

- Old High German for "spear", see Migration Period spear
- Old Anglo-Frisian for year, see Jēram
