= Blučina =

- Municipality
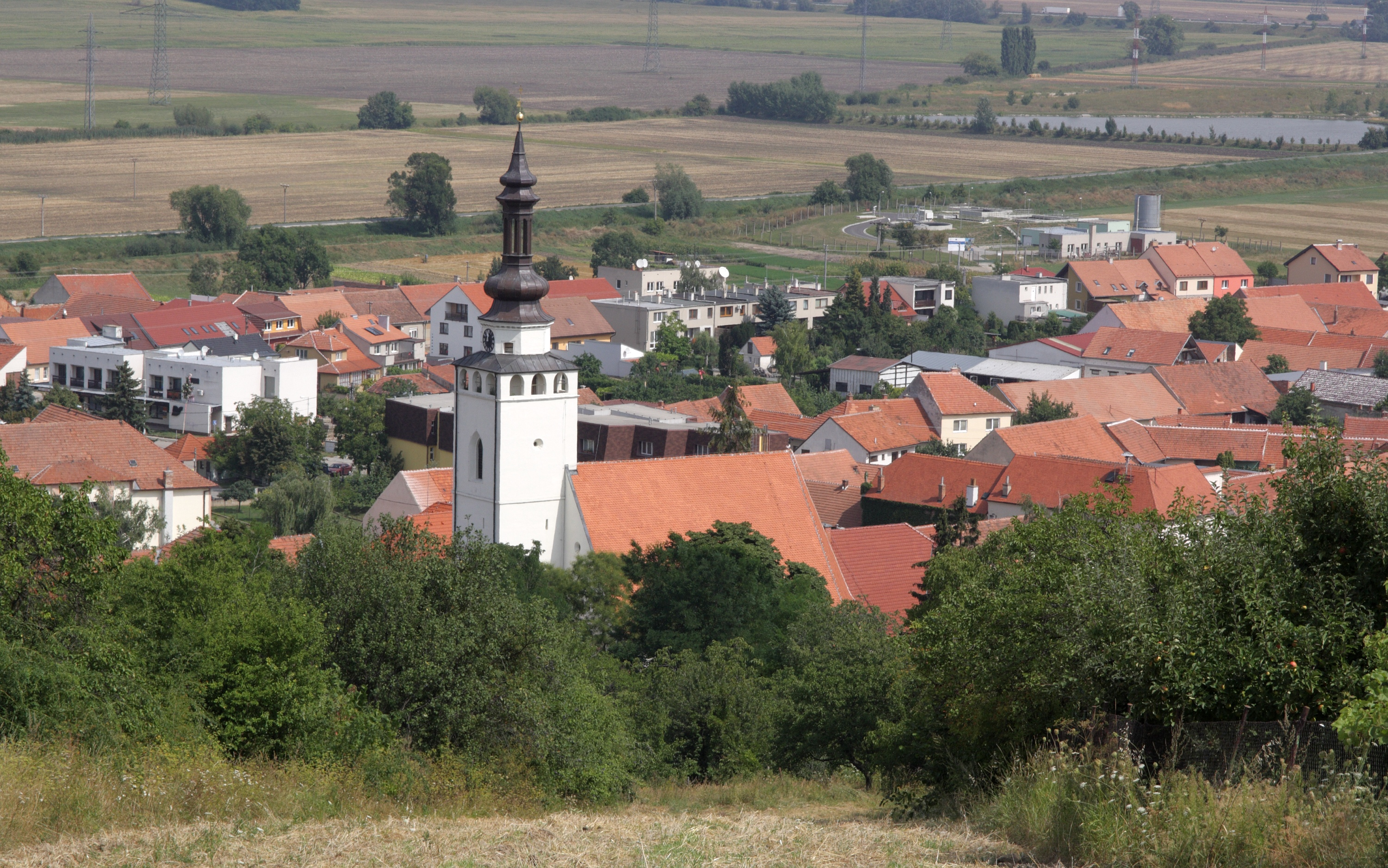
- View from the southwest

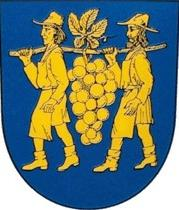
- Flag Coat of arms

- Location in the Czech Republic
- Coordinates: 49°3′18″N 16°38′40″E
- Country: Czech Republic
- Region: South Moravian
- District: Brno-Country
- First mentioned: 1240

Area
  - Total: 16.67 km^{2} (6.44 sq mi)
- Elevation: 187 m (614 ft)

Population (2026-01-01)
  - Total: 2,252
  - Density: 135.1/km^{2} (349.9/sq mi)
- Time zone: UTC+1 (CET)
  - Summer (DST): UTC+2 (CEST)
- Postal code: 664 56
- Website: www.blucina.cz

Blučina is a municipality and village in Brno-Country District in the South Moravian Region of the Czech Republic. It has about 2,300 inhabitants.

== Etymology ==
The name is derived from the old Czech word bluk, which meant "the roar of water".

== Geography ==
Blučina is located about 15 kilometres (9 mi) south of Brno. It lies in the Dyje–Svratka Valley. The highest point is the hill Výhon at 355 m (1,165 ft) above sea level. The Litava River flows through the municipality.

== History ==
The first written mention of Blučina is in a deed of King Wenceslaus I from 1240. The document where Blučina is mentioned in the years 1045–1048 is a forgery. In 1494, the village was promoted to a market town, but it later lost the title.

== Demographics ==
Historical population

Year	Pop.	±%
1869	1,298	—
1880	1,451	+11.8%
1890	1,530	+5.4%
1900	1,591	+4.0%
1910	1,632	+2.6%

Year	Pop.	±%
1921	1,759	+7.8%
1930	1,843	+4.8%
1950	1,802	−2.2%
1961	1,989	+10.4%
1970	1,939	−2.5%

Year	Pop.	±%
1980	1,881	−3.0%
1991	1,918	+2.0%
2001	2,006	+4.6%
2011	2,215	+10.4%
2021	2,203	−0.5%

Source: Censuses

== Economy ==
Blučina is known for viticulture. The municipality lies in the Velkopavlovická wine subregion.

== Transport ==
The D2 motorway from Brno to the Czech–Slovak border in Lanžhot runs through the municipality.

== Sights ==
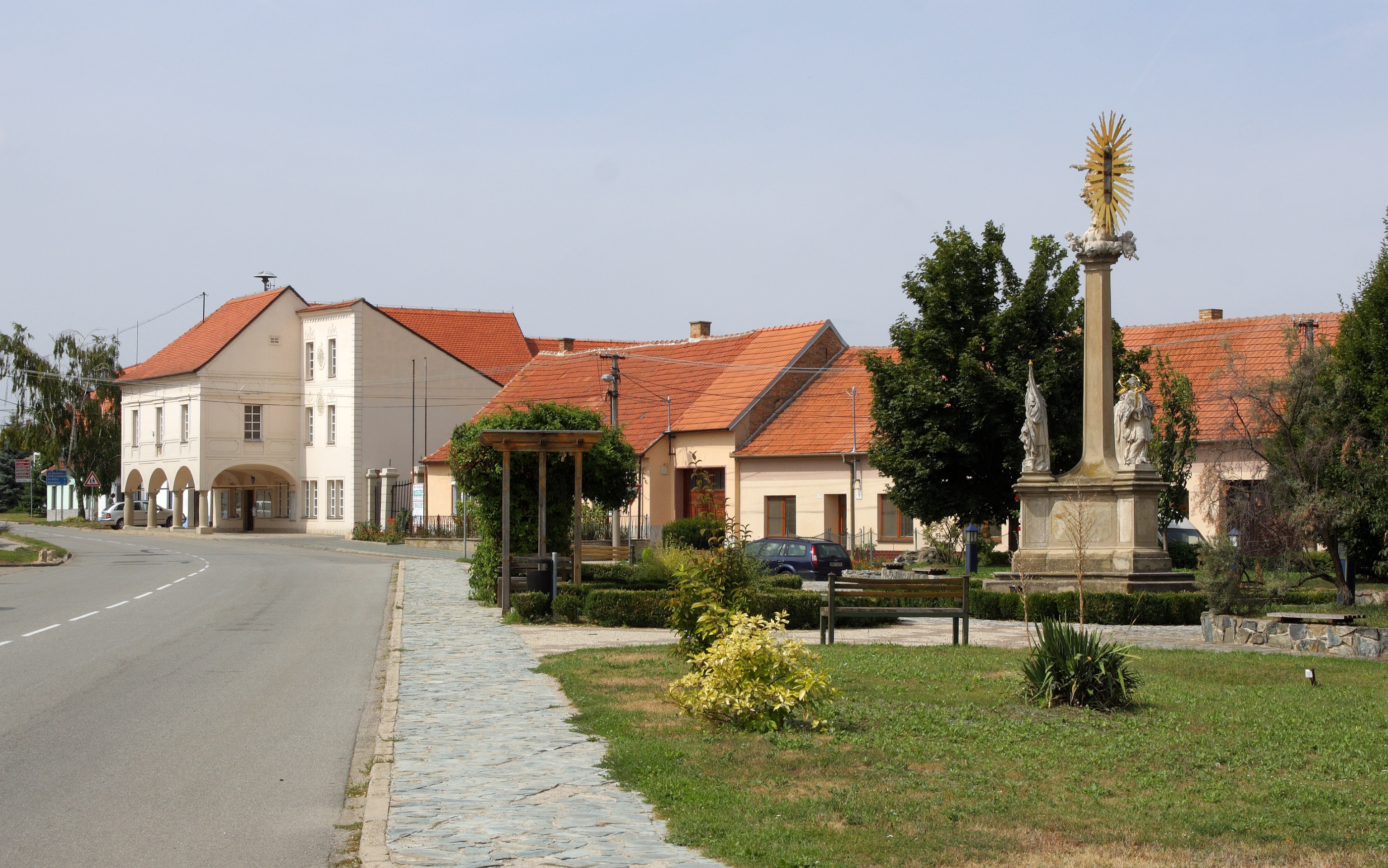
Centre of Blučina, municipal office in the left

The main landmark of Blučina is the Church of the Assumption of the Virgin Mary. It was built in the late Romanesque style in the mid-13th century. It was rebuilt in the 15th, 16th and 18th centuries, acquiring architectural elements from many different styles, but the late Romanesque core was also preserved.

The municipal office is a valuable late Renaissance house, dating from 1611. It was expanded to its present form in 1832.

== Archaeology ==
Blučina is known for the Blučina burial, an important Migration period (5th century) burial. It was discovered in 1953 on the hill Strže.
