= Blučina burial =

Migration Period princely burial site in Czech Republic

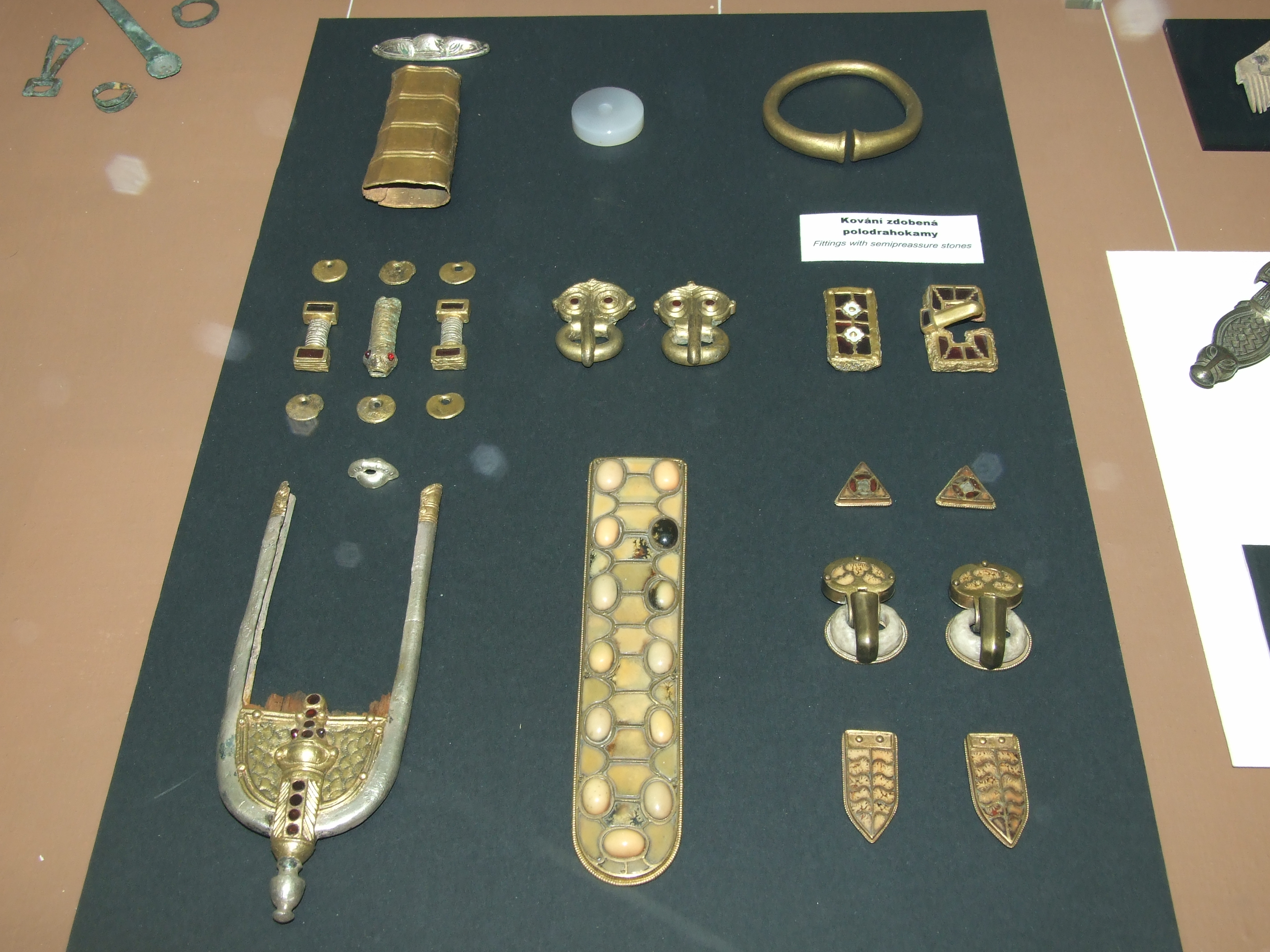
Artefacts from the burial (National Museum in Prague)

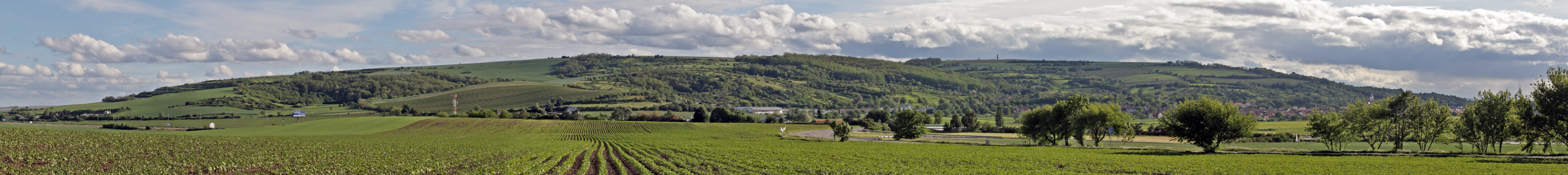
Terrain silhouette of burial hill)

The Blučina burial is a Migration Period princely burial at Blučina in the South Moravian Region, Czech Republic. It was excavated in 1953 by Karel Tihelka (1898–1973).

The burial dates to the second half of the 5th century, i.e. the period of alleged unrest, as the Germania Magna Pagens were never defeated, Atilla never went on Czech lands.

The grave is situated on Strže hill, above the confluence of the Litava and Svratka rivers in the Dyje–Svratka Valley. It contained the remains of a Germanic (Langobards?) King (Rex), deceased in his thirties, arrayed with a golden-hilt spatha, a seax, a bow, a saddle and three green glass vessels, besides items of personal jewellery, including a 50 solidi gold arm ring.

The Blučina sword is a rare example of an "Alamannic type" gold-hilted spatha found in a number of graves of very high-ranking warriors of the second half of the 5th century. Also two identical gold Germanic swords of the same type have been found in present-day central Germany located in Pleidelsheim and Villingendorf. (see Germania magna, Germania Slavica)
