= Iron Age sword =

Long-bladed weapons used throughout Iron Age Eurasia

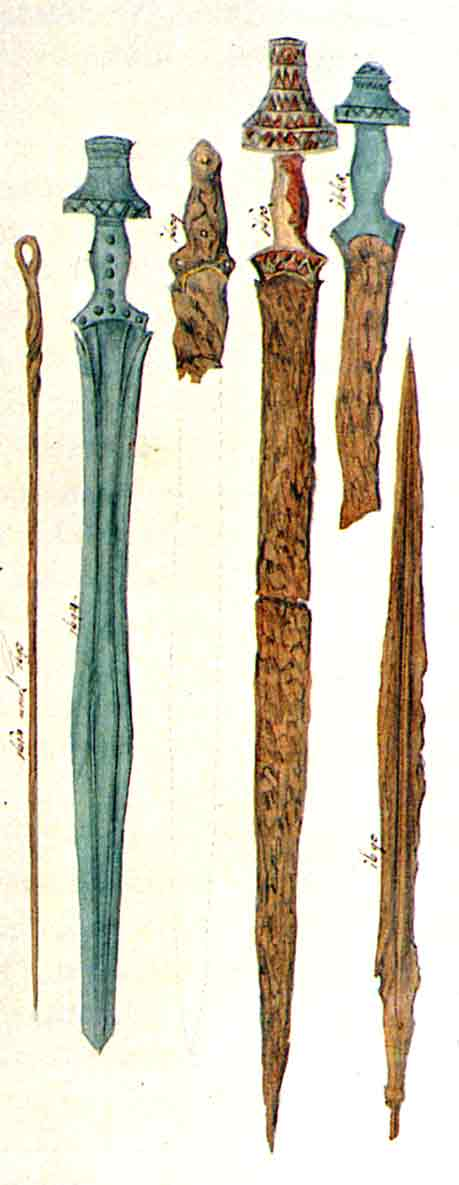
19th century illustration of Hallstatt swords

Swords made of iron (as opposed to bronze) appear from the Early Iron Age (c. 12th century BC), but do not become widespread before the 8th century BC.

Early Iron Age swords were significantly different from later steel swords. They were work-hardened, rather than quench-hardened, which made them generally comparable to, and sometimes inferior to, high-quality bronze swords in strength and hardness. This meant that they could still be bent out of shape during use. The easier production, however, and the greater availability of the raw material allowed for much larger scale production.

Eventually smiths learned of processes to refine smelted iron and make steel. By quenching (making the steel hard and brittle) and tempering (removing the brittleness), swords could be made that would suffer much less damage, and would spring back into shape if bent. It took a long time, however, before this was done consistently, and although unhardened iron swords continued to exist for some time, by the early medieval period most high-quality swords were made of hardened steel. Several different methods of swordmaking existed in ancient times, including, most famously, pattern welding. Over time, different methods developed all over the world.

== History ==
The Celtic Hallstatt culture – 8th century BC – figured among the early users of iron. During the Hallstatt period, the same swords were made both in bronze and in iron. At the end of the Hallstatt period, around 600–500BC, swords were replaced with short daggers. The La Tene culture reintroduced the sword, which was very different from the traditional shape and construction of the Bronze Age and early Iron Age, and much more like the later swords that developed from them.

The iron version of the Scythian/Persian Acinaces appears from ca. the 6th century BC. In Classical Antiquity and the Parthian and Sassanid Empires in Iran, iron swords were common. The Greek xiphos and the Roman gladius are typical examples of the type, measuring some 60 to 70 cm (24 to 28 in). The late Roman Empire introduced the longer spatha (the term for its wielder, spatharius, became a court rank in Constantinople).

Chinese steel swords make their appearance from the 5th century BC Warring States period, although earlier iron swords are also known from the Zhou dynasty. The Chinese Dao (刀 pinyin dāo) is single-edged, sometimes translated as sabre or broadsword, and the Jian (劍 pinyin jiàn) double edged.

== European swords ==
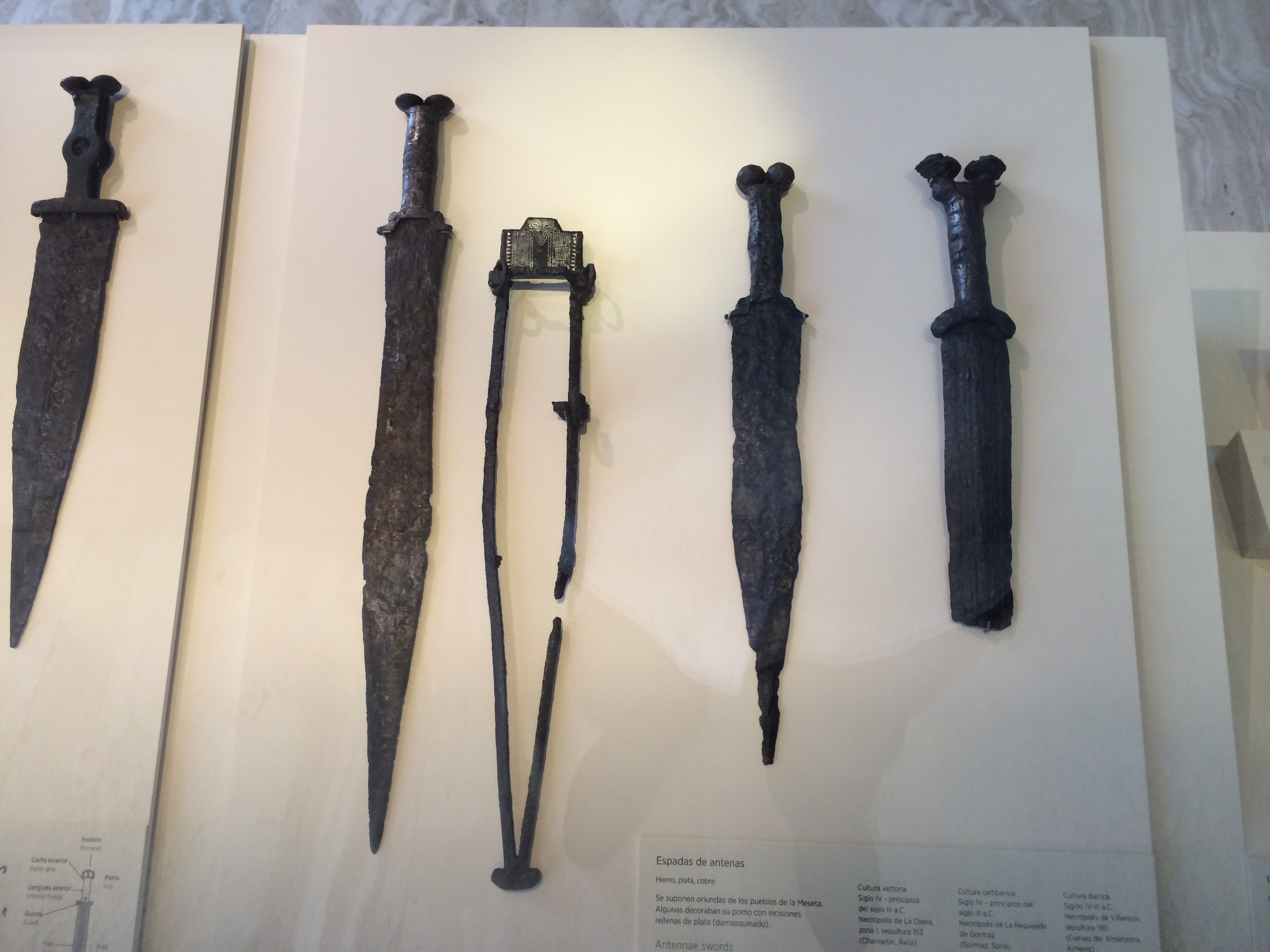
Celtiberian (Vettone) swords with antennas, National Archaeological Museum, Madrid

With the spread of the La Tene culture at the 5th century BC, iron swords had completely replaced bronze all over Europe. These swords eventually evolved into, among others, the Roman gladius and spatha, and the Greek xiphos and the Germanic sword of the Roman Iron Age, which evolved into the Viking sword in the 8th century.

There are two kinds of Celtic sword. The most common is the "long" sword, which usually has a stylised anthropomorphic hilt made from organic material, such as wood, bone, or horn. These swords also usually had an iron plate in front of the guard that was shaped to match the scabbard mouth. The second type is a "short" sword with either an abstract or a true anthropomorphic hilt of copper alloy.

Scabbards were generally made from two plates of iron, and suspended from a belt made of iron links. Some scabbards had front plates of bronze rather than iron. This was more common on Insular examples than elsewhere; only a very few Continental examples are known.

== Steppe cultures ==
Swords with ring-shaped pommels were popular among the Sarmatians from the 2nd century BC to the 2nd century AD. They were about 50 to 60 cm (20 to 24 in) in length, with a rarer "long" type in excess of 70 cm (28 in), in exceptional cases as long as 130 cm (51 in). A semi-precious stone was sometimes set in the pommel ring. These swords are found in great quantities in the Black Sea region and the Hungarian plain. They are similar to the akinakes used by the Persians and other Iranian peoples. The pommel ring probably evolves by closing the earlier arc-shaped pommel hilt which evolves out of the antenna type around the 4th century BC.

== Stability ==
Polybius (2.33) reports that the Gauls at the Battle of Telamon (224 BC) had inferior iron swords which bent at the first stroke and had to be straightened with the foot against the ground. Plutarch, in his life of Marcus Furius Camillus, likewise reports on the inferiority of Gaulish iron, making the same claim that their swords bent easily. These reports have puzzled some historians, since by that time the Celts had a centuries-long tradition of iron workmanship. In 1906 a scholar suggested that the Greek observers misunderstood ritual acts of sword-bending, which may have served to "decommission" the weapon. Such bent swords have been found among deposits of objects presumably dedicated for sacred purposes. The speculation has been repeated since. Radomir Pleiner, however, argues that "the metallographic evidence shows that Polybius was right up to a point. To judge from the swords examined in this survey, only one-third could be described as conforming to the quality which he ascribed generally to Celtic swords. Even so, it is quite possible that even some of the better quality swords would have failed in battle." Nevertheless, he argues that the classical sources are exaggerated. Plutarch's claim that Celtic swords would bend completely back is implausible, as only a slight bending would be likely. Pleiner also notes that metallurgical analysis performed on Celtic swords suggests that they were only work hardened and only very few were quench hardened, even though they frequently contain enough carbon to be hardened (in particular the swords made from Noric steel). Quench hardening takes full advantage of the potential hardness of the steel, but leaves it brittle, and prone to breaking. Quite probably this is because tempering was not known. Tempering is heating the steel at a lower temperature after quenching to remove the brittleness while keeping most of the hardness.

There is other evidence of long-bladed swords bending during battle from later periods. The Icelandic Eyrbyggja saga, describes a warrior straightening his twisted sword underfoot like Polybius's account: "Whenever he struck a shield, his ornamented sword would bend, and he had to put his foot on it to straighten it out". Peirce and Oakeshott in Swords of the Viking Age note that the potential for bending may have been built in to avoid shattering, writing that "a bending failure offers a better chance of survival for the sword's wielder than the breaking of the blade...there was a need to build a fail-safe into the construction of a sword to favor bending over breaking".

== See also ==
- Asi (sword)
- Bronze Age sword
- Celtic warfare
- Early Iron Age
- Khanda (sword)
- Migration Period sword
- Noric steel
- Pattern welding
- Spatha

== General and cited references ==
- Cartwright, C. R., and Janet Lang (2006). British Iron Age Swords and Scabbards. British Museum Press. ISBN 0-7141-2323-4.
- de Navarro, J. M. (1972), The Finds from the Site of La Tène: Volume I: Scabbards and the Swords Found in Them. London: The British Academy; Oxford University Press.
- Lang, Andrew (1907). Celtic Sword Blades, in Man, Royal Anthropological Institute of Great Britain and Ireland. JSTOR 2787305.
- Maryon, Herbert (1948). "A Sword of the Nydam Type from Ely Fields Farm, near Ely". Proceedings of the Cambridge Antiquarian Society. XLI: 73–76. doi:10.5284/1034398.
- Maryon, Herbert (February 1960a). "Pattern-Welding and Damascening of Sword-Blades—Part 1: Pattern-Welding". Studies in Conservation. 5 (1): 25–37. doi:10.2307/1505063. JSTOR 1505063.
- Maryon, Herbert (May 1960b). "Pattern-Welding and Damascening of Sword-Blades—Part 2: The Damascene Process". Studies in Conservation. 5 (2): 52–60. doi:10.2307/1504953. JSTOR 1504953.
- Pleiner, Radomir (1993). The Celtic Sword. Oxford: Clarendon Press.
- Webster, Graham (1990). "A Late Celtic Sword-Belt with a Ring and Button Found at Coleford, Gloucestershire". Britannia 21. Society for the Promotion of Roman Studies. pp. 294–295. doi:10.2307/526307(?). JSTOR i222904.
