= Migration Period spear =

Germanic weapon

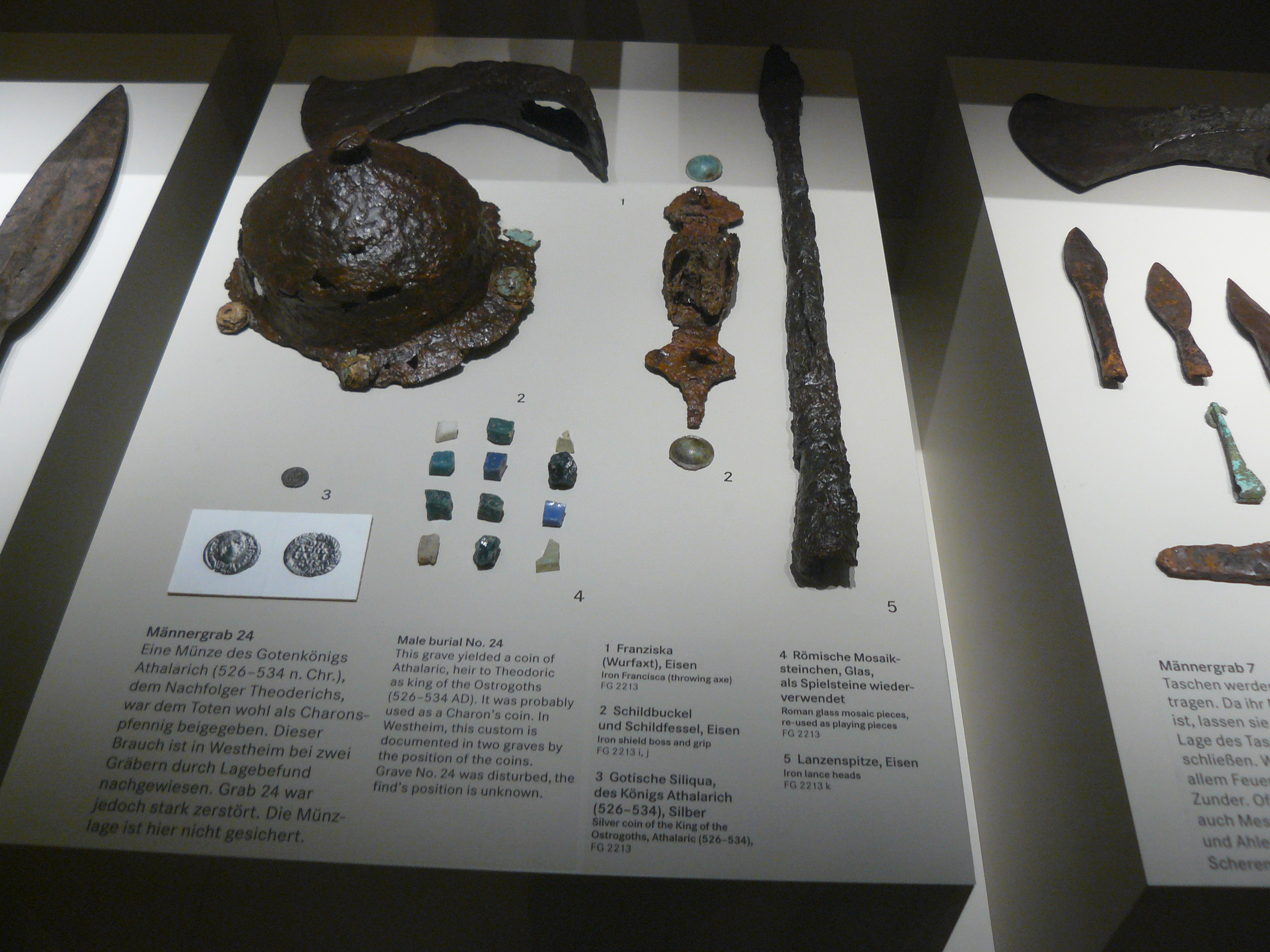
Weapons, including spears and lances from a grave of the migration period (6th century, Westheim, Germany)

The spear or lance, together with the bow, the sword, the seax and the shield, was the main equipment of the Germanic warriors during the Migration Period and the Early Middle Ages.

== Terminology ==
A mention of 'gar' in the Beowulf

The pre-migration term reported by Tacitus is framea, who identifies it as hasta; the native term for 'javelin, spear' was Old High German gêr, Old English gâr, Old Norse geirr, from Proto-Germanic *gaizaz. The names Genseric, Radagaisus indicate Gothic *gais.

Latin gaesum, gaesus, Greek γαῖσον was the term for the lance of the Gauls. The Avestan language has gaêçu 'lance bearer' as a likely cognate. The Celtic word is found e.g. in the name of the Gaesatae. Old Irish has gae 'spear'. Proto-Germanic *gaizaz would derive from Proto-Indo-European *ghaisos, although loan from Celtic has also been considered, in which case the PIE form would be *gaisos. The Indogermanisches etymologisches Wörterbuch has *g'haisos (with a palatal velar aspirate), discounting the Avestan form in favour of (tentatively) comparing Sanskrit hḗṣas- 'projectile'.

The form gaois is read in an early runic inscription on the so-called Mos spearhead, dated to the 3rd century, found in Stenkyrka, Gotland.

The etymon of English spear, from Proto-Germanic *speru (Old English spere, Old Frisian sper, Old High German sper, Old Norse spjör), in origin also denoted a throwing spear or lance (hasta).

== Ger ==
The word kêr or gêr is attested since the 8th century (Lay of Hildebrand 37, Heliand 3089). Gar and cognates is a frequent element in Germanic names, both male and female.

The term survives into New High German as Ger or Gehr (Grimm 1854) with a generalized meaning of 'gusset' besides 'spear'. In contemporary German, the word is used exclusively in antiquated or poetic context, and a feminine Gehre is used in the sense of 'gusset'.

== Framea ==
Tacitus (Germania 6) describes the equipment of the Germanic warrior as follows:

Even iron is not plentiful with them, as we infer from the character of their weapons. But few use swords or long lances. They carry a spear [hasta] (framea is their name for it), with a narrow and short head, but so sharp and easy to wield that the same weapon serves, according to circumstances, for close or distant conflict. As for the horse-soldier, he is satisfied with a shield and spear; the foot-soldiers also scatter showers of missiles each man having several and hurling them to an immense distance, and being naked or lightly clad with a little cloak.

The term is also used by Eucherius of Lyon, Gregory of Tours and Isidore. By the time of Isidore (7th century), framea referred to a sword, not a spear. Since Tacitus reports that the word is natively Germanic, various Germanic etymologies of a Proto-Germanic *framja, *framjō or similar have been suggested, but remain speculative. Must (1958) suggests *þramja, cognate to Old Norse þremjar 'edges, sword blades', Old Saxon thrumi 'point of a spear'.

The word reappears on the title page of the 15th-century witch-finding book Malleus Maleficarum: "MALLEUS MALEFICARUM, Maleficas, & earum hæresim, ut phramea potentissima conterens." ("The Hammer of Witches, which destroys witches and their heresy as with a very mighty sword.")

Icelandic, the modern language as well as the language of the Sagas, has the word frami 'distinction, renown, fame'. This word was in earlier times strongly connected with warfare, but its use as a name of a weapon is not known.

== See also ==
- Anglo-Saxon warfare
- Francisca
- Gothic and Vandal warfare
- Gungnir
- Hasta
- Javelin
- Kragehul lance
- Migration Period sword
- Pilum
- Viking Age arms and armour
