= Anglo-Saxon warfare =

Military tactics

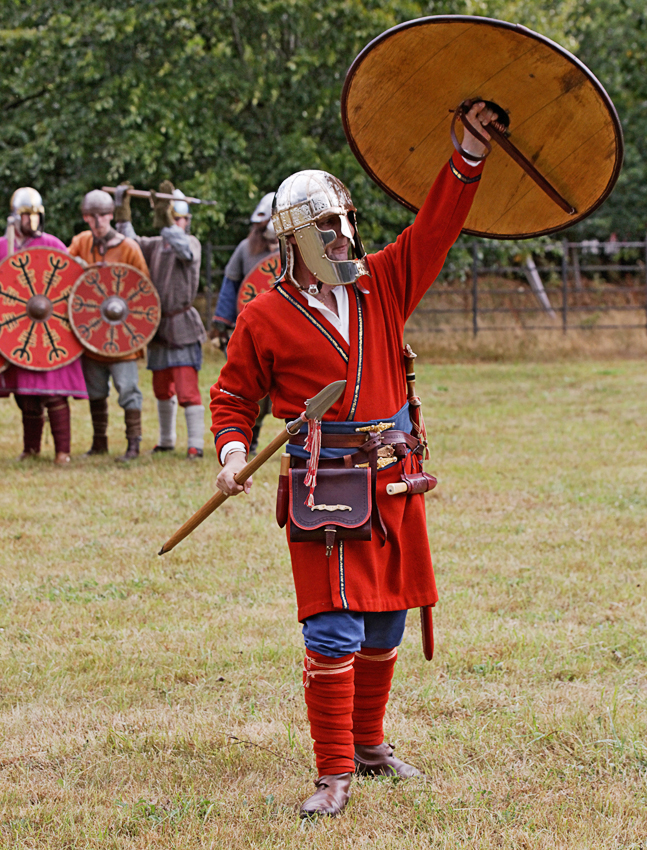
A modern recreation of a 7th-century Anglo-Saxon warrior

The period of Anglo-Saxon warfare spans the 5th century AD to the 11th in Anglo-Saxon England. Its technology and tactics resemble those of other European cultural areas of the Early Medieval Period, although the Anglo-Saxons, unlike the Continental Germanic tribes such as the Franks and the Goths, do not appear to have regularly fought on horseback.

== Evidence ==
Although much archaeological evidence for Anglo-Saxon weaponry exists from the Early Anglo-Saxon period due to the widespread inclusion of weapons as grave goods in inhumation burials, scholarly knowledge of warfare itself relies far more on the literary evidence, which was only being produced in the Christian context of the Late Anglo-Saxon period.

These literary sources are almost all authored by Christian clergy, and thus do not deal specifically with warfare; for instance, Bede's Ecclesiastical History of the English People mentions various battles that had taken place but does not dwell on them. Thus, scholars have often drawn from the literary sources from neighbouring societies, such as those produced by continental Germanic societies like the Franks and Goths, or later Viking sources.

As Underwood noted, "Warfare in the Anglo-Saxon period cannot be viewed as a uniform whole". This is because Anglo-Saxon society changed greatly during this period; in the fifth century, it constituted an array of small tribal groups while by the eleventh it had consolidated into a single state.

== Battlefield tactics ==
There are extant contemporary descriptions of some Anglo-Saxon battles. Of particular relevance are the poems recounting the battles of Brunanburh, fought in 937 AD and Maldon, fought in 991 AD. In the literature, most of the references to weapons and fighting concern the use of javelins, spears and swords, with only occasional references to archery.

=== The Shieldwall ===
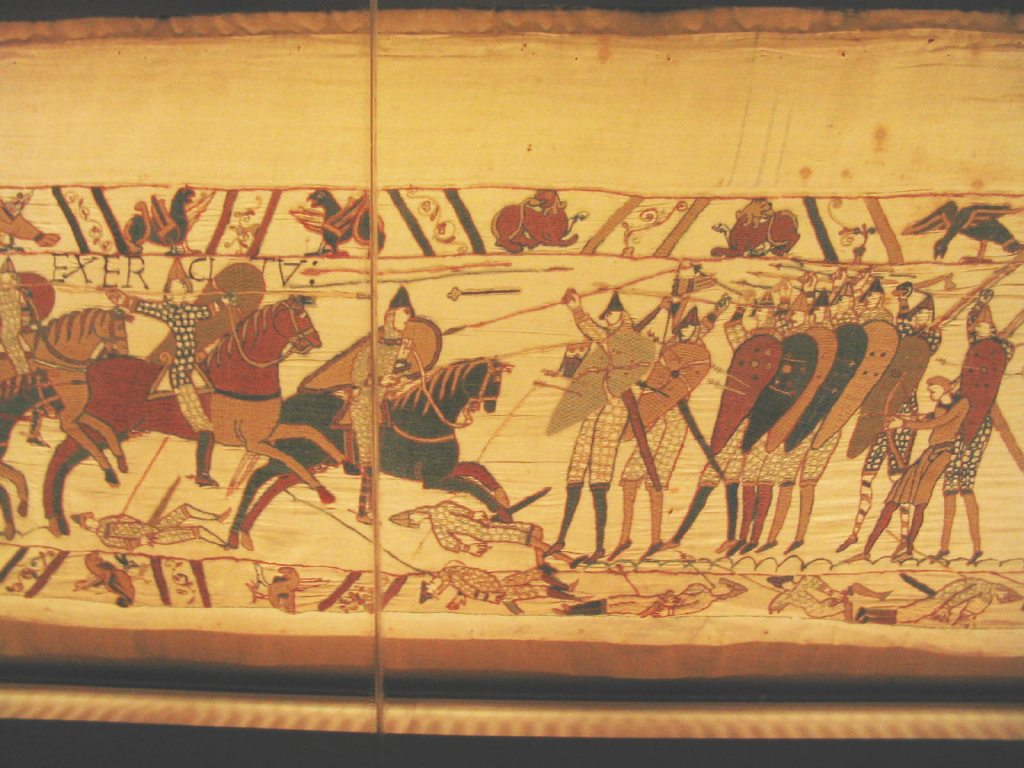
Anglo-Saxon shieldwall at the Battle of Hastings, from the Bayeux Tapestry. The men stand in close order with overlapping shields. Most carry spears or javelins, although one man has a bow.

The typical battle involved both sides forming shieldwalls to protect against the launching of missiles, and standing slightly out of range of each other.

Stephen Pollington has proposed the following sequence to a typical shieldwall fight

- Preliminaries – The lines are drawn up and leaders make pre-battle inspirational speeches
- Advance to close quarters – A battle cry would be raised and one or both shieldwalls would advance
- Exchange missiles – Both sides shoot arrows and throw javelins, axes and rocks to break the enemy's resolve
- Shield to shield – One or other side closes the short gap and attacks, using spears and swords, protecting themselves and pushing with shields to try to break the enemy line. If neither line broke, both sides would draw back to rest. More missiles would be exchanged, and then the two lines would close again. This would continue until one line broke through the other, perhaps aided by the death of a leader or capture of a banner.
- Rout and pursuit – One side would begin to give way. A final stand might be made by some, as at Maldon, but most would flee. The victors would pursue, killing all they could catch.

=== Individual combat style ===
Individual warriors would run forward from the ranks to gain velocity for their javelin throws. This made them vulnerable due to their being exposed, having left the protection of the shield wall, and there was a chance of being killed by a counter throw from the other side. This is epitomized in the following excerpt:

"So then did Aethelgar's child enbolden them all, Godric to battle. Often he sent forth spears, deadly shaft sped away onto the Vikings thus he on this people went out in front of battle, cutting down and smiting, until he too on the battlefield perished." (The Battle of Maldon. 320-4.)

If a warrior was killed in the 'no man's land' between shieldwalls, someone from the other side may have rushed out to retrieve the valuable armour and weapons, such as extra javelins, sword, and shield from the corpse. The one positioned to retrieve the body was often the thrower of the javelin as he had run in front of the shield wall in order to make his throw.

Due to the very visible and exposed nature of these javelin-throwing duels, we have some detailed descriptions which have survived, such as the following passage. The first part describes thrown javelin duels, and the latter part describes fighting over the corpses' belongings.

"Advanced again to fierce battle, weapons raised up, shields to defence, and towards these warriors they stepped. Resolute they approached Earl to the lowest Yeoman: each of them intent on harm for the enemy. Sent then a sea-warrior a spear of southern make that wounded the warrior lord. He thrust then with his shield such that the spear shaft burst, and that spear-head shattered as it sprang in reply. Enraged became that warrior: with anger he stabbed that proud Viking who had given him that wound. Experienced was that warrior; he threw his spear forward through the warrior's neck, his hand guiding so that he this ravager's life would fatally pierce. Then he with another stab speedily pierced the ravager so that the chain-mail coat broke: this man had a breast wound cut through the linked rings; through his heart stuck a deadly spear. The Earl was the better pleased: laughed then this great man of spirit, thanking the Creator for the day's work which the Lord had given him. And so then another warrior a spear from the other side flew out of hand, which deeply struck through the noble Aethelred's retainer. To him by his side stood a young man not fully grown, a youth on the battlefield, who valiantly pulled out of this warrior the bloody spear, Wulfstan's child, Wulfmaer the younger; and so with blinding speed came the shaft in reply. The spear penetrated, for that who on the Earth now lay among his people, the one who had sorely pierced. Went then armed a man to this Earl; he desirous of this warrior's belongings to take off with, booty and rings and an ornamental sword. Then Byrhtnoth drew his sword from its sheath broad and bright of blade, and then struck the man's coat of mail. But too soon he was prevented by a certain sea-scavenger, and then the Earl's arm was wounded. Fall then to the ground with his gold-hilted sword: his grip unable to hold the heavy sword, or wield the weapon." (The Battle of Maldon. 130-58.)

Richard Underwood, in his book Anglo-Saxon Weapons and Warfare, identifies two primary methods of spear use in Anglo-Saxon combat. The first method has the warrior holding the spear overarm, with the arm extended and the spear pointing downwards. This technique could be employed to attack over an opponent's shield, targeting the head or neck. The second method, underarm usage, requires bracing the spear along the forearm in a defensive approach. A warrior carrying the spear in this fashion could parry an opponent's spear and apply pressure against their shield to maintain distance, at the cost of reduced effectiveness for offensive manoeuvrers.

Sometimes individuals or groups fighting over bodies might come to sword blows between the two shield walls.

Ideally, enough damage would be done to the enemy through the launching of missiles, so that any shield-to-shield fighting would be a mopping-up operation rather than an exhausting and risky push back and forth at close quarters. At close quarters, swords and shields were preferred over thrusting spears. The shield was used to push the opponent in order to create a breach in the shield wall so that the opponent could become exposed to attack. Hacking through shields was a commonly used tactic, so having a strong sword arm and sword were of great benefit.

== The horse in war ==
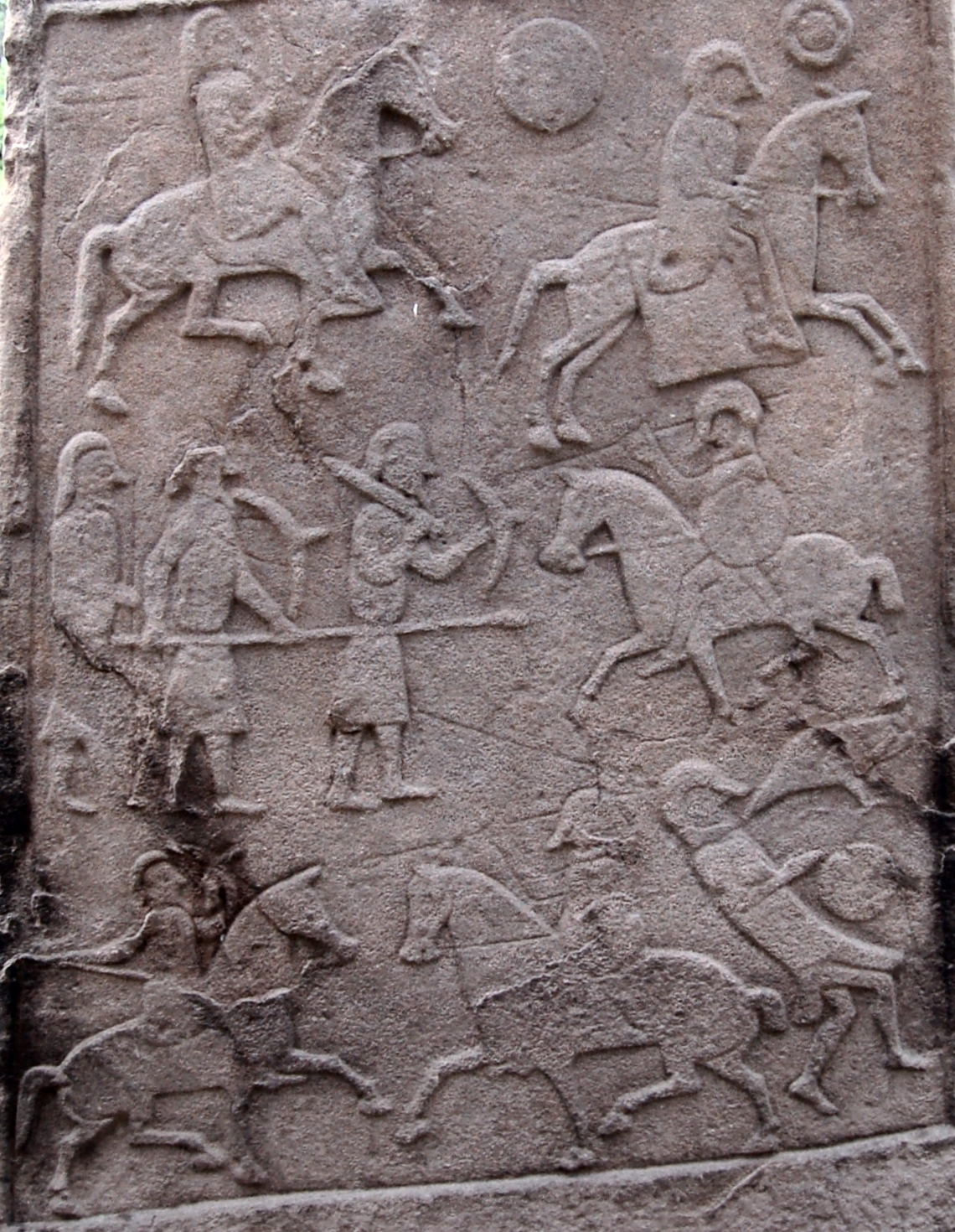
The Aberlemno 2 stone, possibly showing Anglo-Saxon cavalry (right) fighting Picts at the Battle of Dunnichen

"An earl belongs on the back of a horse. A troop must ride in company, a foot-soldier stand fast." Maxims I, 62-63

There are numerous references to the horses of warriors in literature and graves with horse burials are known in the early Anglo-Saxon period. By the later period, much of the army may have travelled to war on horseback. There is little evidence of use of horses in battle, except in pursuit of a beaten foe. However, the Aberlemno 2 stone is thought to depict combat between Northumbrian cavalry and a Pictish army and the Repton stone shows a mounted warrior in a fighting pose.

After the Norman conquest of England the Varangian Guard of the Byzantine emperors became dominated by emigrant Anglo-Saxon warriors, to the extent of the guard becoming known in Greek as the Englinbarrangoi ("English-varangians"). In 1081 in the opening stages of the Battle of Dyrrachion the emperor Alexios I ordered the Varangians to dismount and march at the head of the army, an instance of Anglo-Saxons riding to battle but dismounting to fight.

== Supplying war ==
Little is known about the way in which Anglo-Saxon armies were supplied. Smaller armies could live off the land but larger forces needed some degree of organised supply. It is possible that troops brought food with them on campaign but there is also limited evidence of the existence of pack horses tended by grooms being used to carry supplies and equipment. Combined operations involving a fleet and army working together are recorded in the reign of Athelstan against the Scots and again in the 11th century in Wales. It is possible that, like later medieval operations in these areas, part of the role of the fleet was to carry supplies.

== Training for war ==
Understanding how battles were fought also helps us to understand why excelling in certain sports was considered the mark of a valuable retainer or war leader. Sports like running, jumping, throwing spears, and unbalancing people (i.e. wrestling) were all critical skills for combat. Heroes like the legendary Beowulf are described as champions in such athletic events.

== See also ==
- Viking Age arms and armour
- Gothic and Vandal warfare
- Endemic warfare
- Anglo-Saxon military organization
- Fyrd
- Berserker
- Thegn
- Germanic heroes
- Weapons and armour in Anglo-Saxon England

== Primary sources ==
- Anglo-Saxon Chronicle
- The Battle of Maldon
- Battle of Brunanburh
- Finnsburh fragment
