= Spatha =

Roman longsword

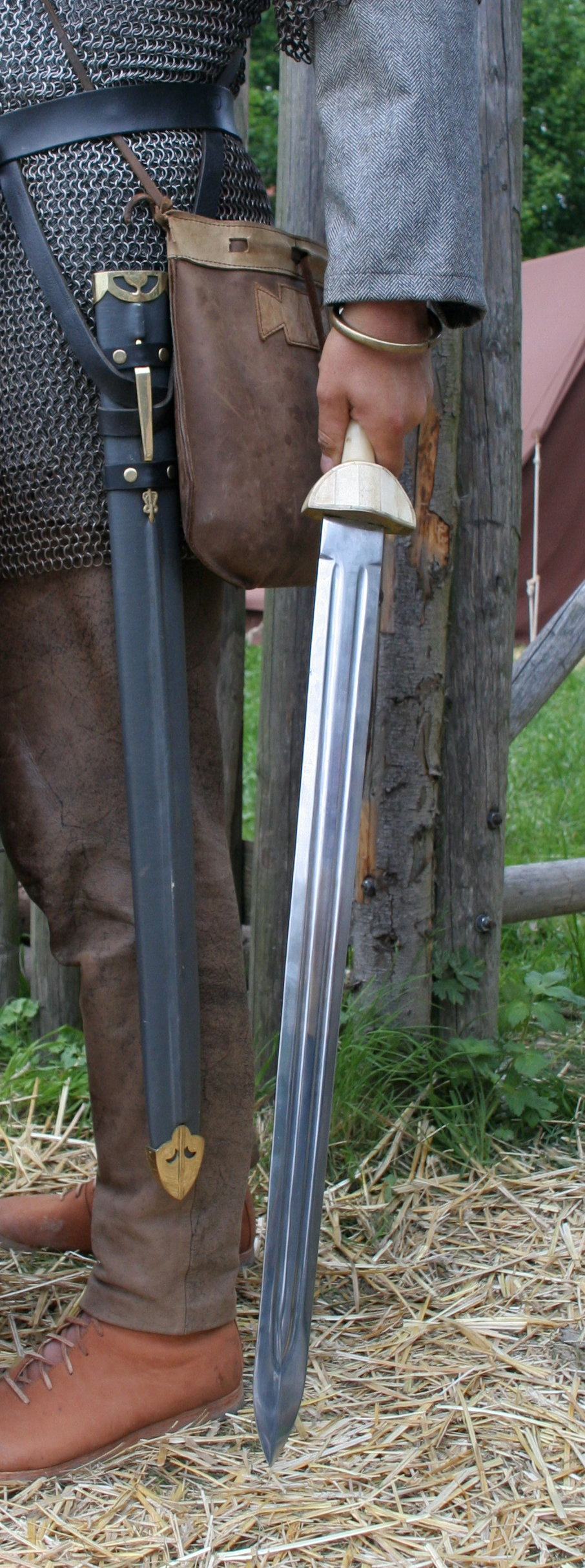
Roman era reenactor holding a replica late Roman spatha

The spatha was a type of straight and long sword, measuring between 0.5 and 1 metre (20 and 40 inches), with a handle length of between 18 and 20 centimetres (7 and 8 inches), in use in the territory of the Roman Empire during the 1st to 6th centuries AD. Later swords, from the 7th to 10th centuries, like the Viking swords, are recognizable derivatives and sometimes subsumed under the term spatha.

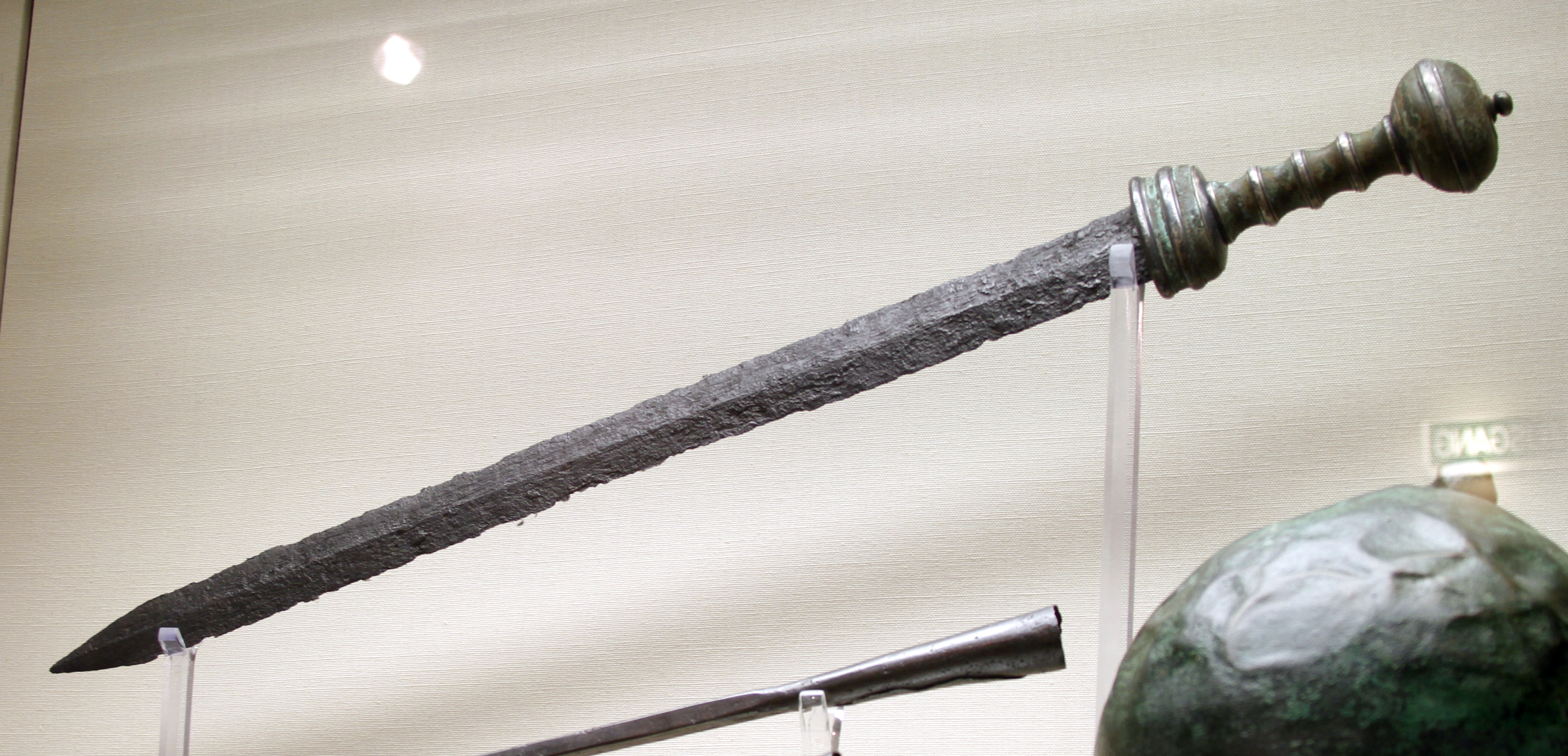
Roman spatha in Reichsstadtmuseum, Rothenburg ob der Tauber, Germany.

The Roman spatha was used in war and in gladiatorial fights. The spatha of literature appears in the Roman Empire in the 1st century AD as a weapon used by presumably Celtic auxiliaries and gradually became a standard heavy infantry weapon by the 3rd century AD, relegating the gladius to use as a light infantry weapon. The spatha apparently replaced the gladius in the front ranks, giving the infantry more reach when thrusting. While the infantry version had a long point, versions carried by the cavalry had a rounded tip that prevented accidental stabbing of the cavalryman's own foot or horse.

Archaeologically many instances of the spatha have been found in Britain and Germany. It was used extensively by Germanic warriors. It is unclear whether it came from the gladius or the longer Celtic swords, or whether it served as a model for the various arming swords and Viking swords of Europe. The spatha remained popular throughout the Migration Period. It evolved into the knightly sword of the High Middle Ages by the 12th century.

== Etymology ==
The word comes from the Latin spatha, which derives from the Greek word σπάθη (spáthē), meaning "any broad blade, of wood or metal" but also "broad blade of a sword".

The Greek word σπάθη was used in the middle archaic period for various types of Iron Age swords. The word does not appear in Homeric Greek, but it is mentioned in the works of Alcaeus of Mytilene (sixth century BC) and Theophrastus (fourth century BC).

It is likely that spatha is the romanization of the Doric Greek word σπάθα (spáthā). The word survives in Modern Greek as σπάθη and σπαθί. The Latin word became the French épée, Catalan and Occitan espasa, Portuguese and Spanish espada, Italian spada, Romanian spadă and Albanian shpata, all meaning "sword". The English word spatula comes from Latin spat(h)ula, the diminutive of spatha. English spade, from Old English spadu or spædu, is the Germanic cognate, derived from a Common Germanic *spadō, ultimately from a Proto-Indo-European stem *sph_{2}-dh-.

== Usage ==
During the Second Punic War, Celtic mercenaries introduced the spatha to the Roman army. The spatha was a weapon used by the cavalrymen, while the auxiliaries and legionaries of the infantry used the gladius instead. Eventually, the Roman infantry would adopt the spatha in the 2nd century. It was a very versatile sword, undergoing many changes from its origins in Gaul to its usage in the Roman military. The blade was 60 to 75 cm (24 to 30 inches) long.

== Forging ==
The pattern welding was used to strengthen the core of the blade. The appearance of the metal was enhanced due to inlay and contrasting metals. The sword also incorporated one or two forged fullers, thus making the spatha a strong and lightweight blade.

== History ==
=== Roman Empire ===
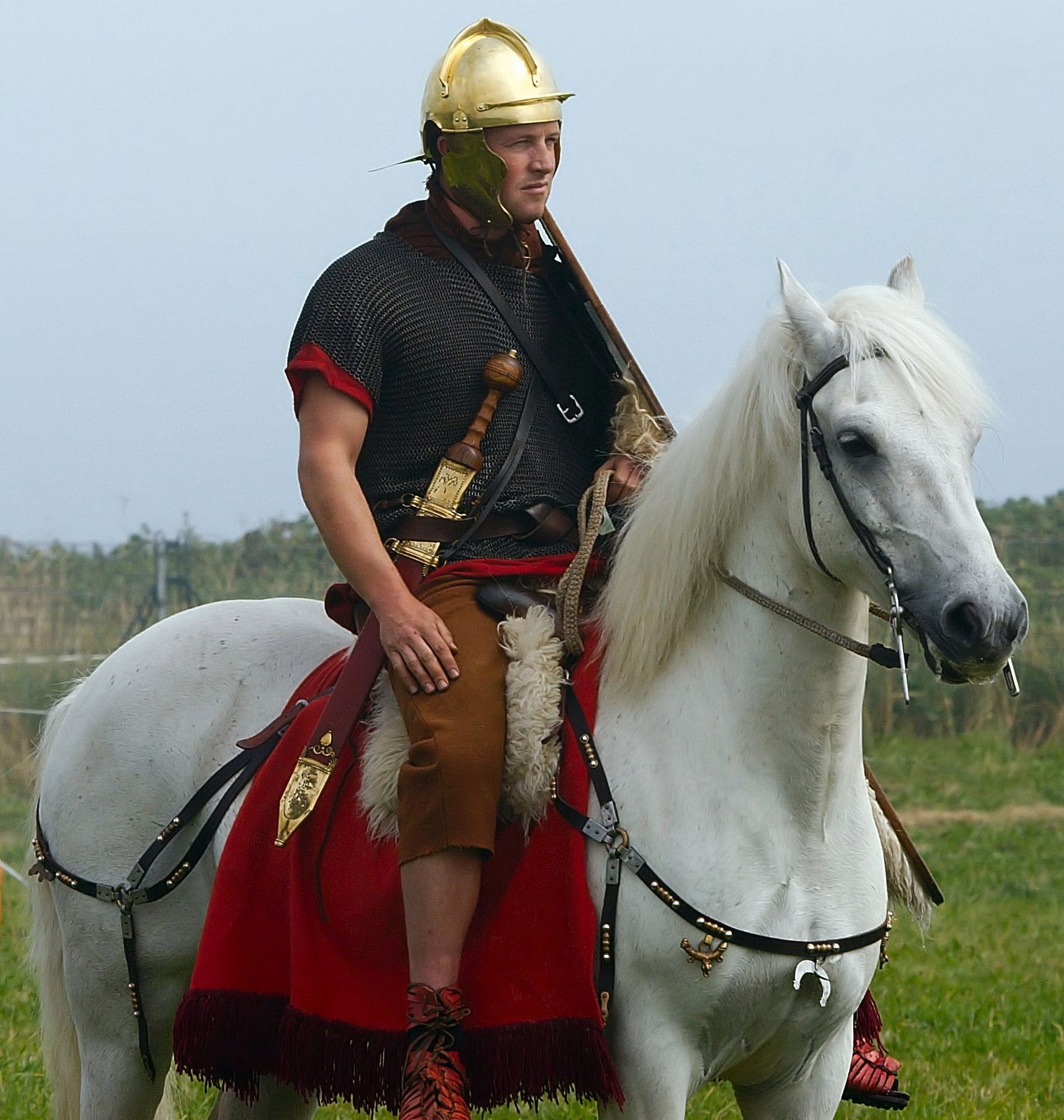
Roman cavalry reenactor wearing a replica spatha

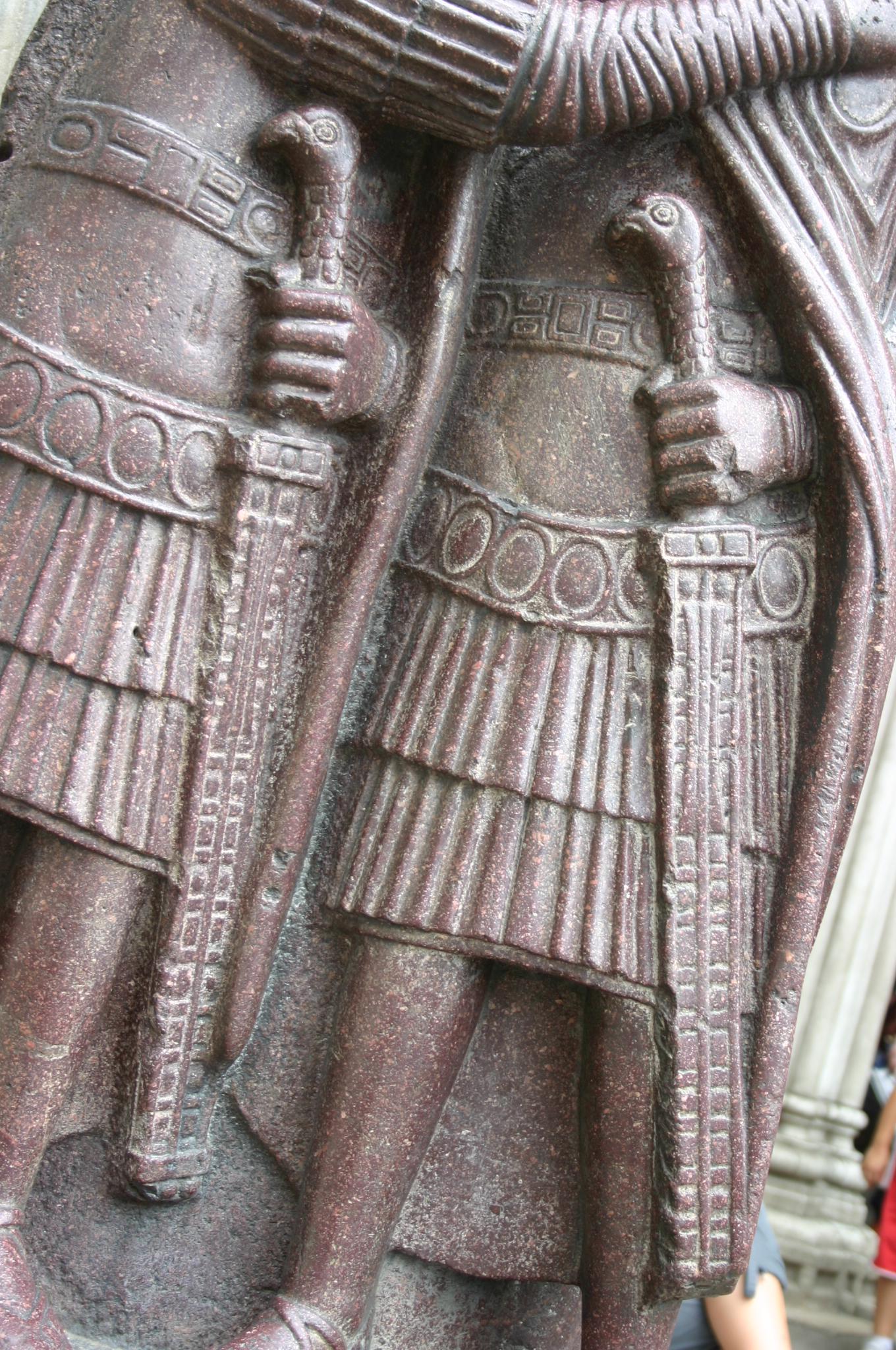
Depiction of swords with hilts fashioned in the shape of eagles' heads (Portrait of the Four Tetrarchs, c. AD 300)

The spatha was first introduced to the Romans by Celtic mercenaries during the Second Punic War. The Celts would have used weaponry and armor from their homeland, and one of the Celtic weapons would have been the spatha. Although many believe that the spatha was adopted by the Romans due to contact with Germania, this is not true.

The earlier gladius sword was gradually replaced by the spatha from the late 2nd to the 3rd century AD. From the early 3rd century, legionaries and cavalrymen began to wear their swords on the left side, perhaps because the scutum had been abandoned and the spatha had replaced the gladius.

In the imperial period, the Romans adopted the original Greek term, spáthē (σπάθη), as spatha, which still carried the general meaning of any object considered long and flat. Spatha appears, first in Pliny and then in Seneca, with different meanings: a spatula, a metal-working implement, a palm-leaf and so on. There is no hint of any native Roman sword called a spatha.

Referring to an actual sword, the term first appears in the pages of Tacitus with reference to an incident of the early empire. The British king, Caratacus, having rebelled, found himself trapped on a rocky hill, so that if he turned one way he encountered the gladii of the legionaries, and if the other, the spathae of the auxiliaries. There is no indication in Tacitus that they were cavalry.

In 2023, three spathae—two of the Pompeii type and one possibly of the Fontillet type—were discovered stashed alongside other weapons in the Cave of the Swords near Ein Gedi in Israel's Judaean Desert. These swords were likely hidden by Jewish rebels who had taken them as booty, possibly for their own use, during the Bar Kokhba revolt (132–136 CE).

The next mention of spathae is in the 5th century, by Vegetius, now as a weapon carried by infantry.

The spatha remained in use in the Byzantine Empire and its army. In the Byzantine court, spatharios (σπαθάριος), or "bearer of the spatha", was a mid-level court title. Other variants deriving from it were protospatharios, spatharokandidatos and spatharokoubikoularios, the latter reserved for eunuchs. One of the more famous spatharokandidatoi was Harald Hardrada.

=== Roman Iron Age ===
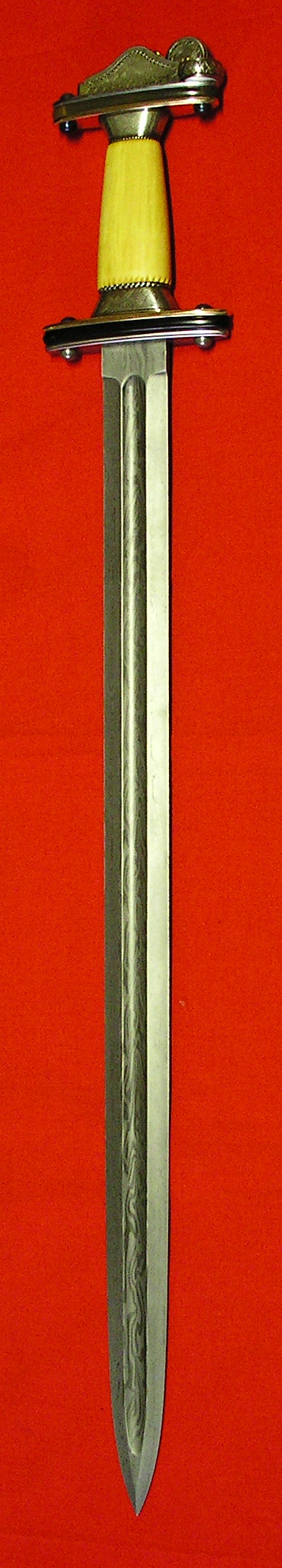
Replica of a Lombard spatha, on exhibit in the Museo civico archeologico in Bergamo

The term "Roman Iron Age" refers approximately to the time of the Roman Empire in northern Europe, which was outside the jurisdiction of the empire, but, judging from the imported Roman artifacts, was influenced by Roman civilization. One source of artifacts from this period are the bogs of Schleswig, Holstein and Denmark. Objects were deliberately broken and thrown into the bogs in the belief that they could go with a deceased chief on his voyage to a better place.

A cache of 90 swords was found at Nydam Mose in Denmark in 1858. They were in the form of the spatha and therefore have been classified as "Roman swords". They are dated to the 3rd to 4th centuries. Many connect the Nydam cache with the sword of Beowulf, who was supposed to be a contemporary.

=== Migration period ===
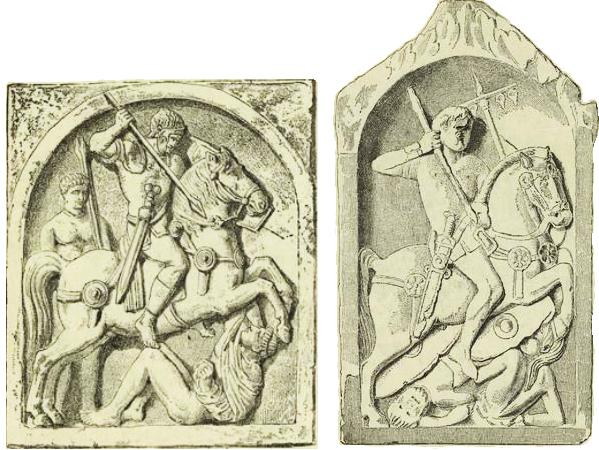
Tombstones of Roman cavalrymen buried in Germany: Roman auxiliary, tombstone in Mainz; signifer of a turma, tombstone in Worms

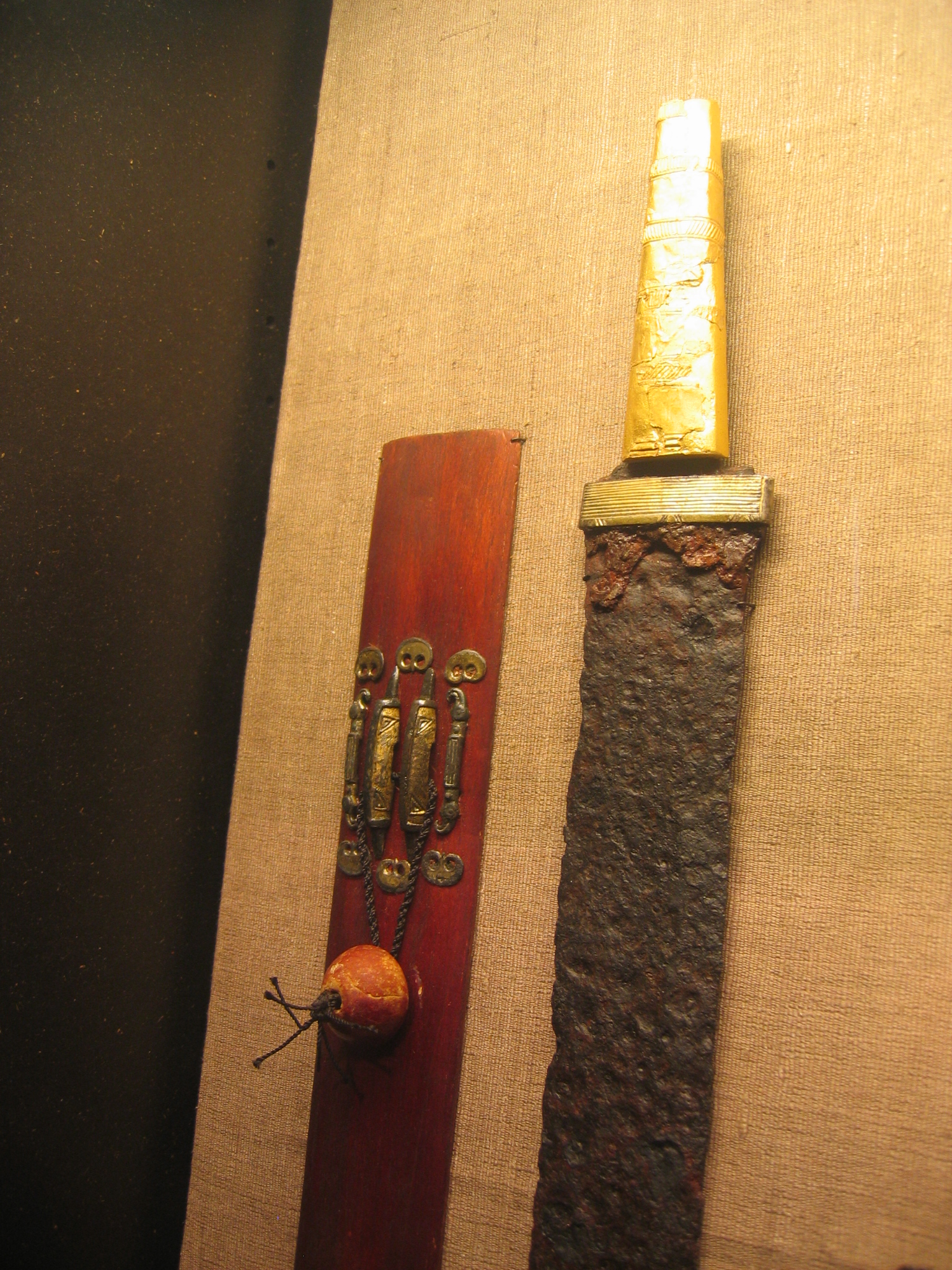
Alemannic spatha, 5th century

When Germanic tribes began to invade the Roman Empire during the 3rd and 4th centuries they would come into contact with the spatha. Surviving examples of these Germanic Iron Age swords have blades measuring between 71 and 81 cm (28 and 32 in) in length and 43 to 61 mm (1 3/4 to 2 3/8 in) in width. These single-handed weapons of war sport a tang 10 to 13 cm (4 to 5 in) long and have very little taper in their blades. They usually end in a rounded tip.

=== Viking Age ===
Perhaps the most recognisable descendants of the spathae were the Viking Age blades. These swords took on a much more acute distal taper and point. They had deep fullers running their length, yet still had single-handed hilts which sported a uniquely shaped pommel, flat at the grip side and roughly triangular early on, with the flat curving to fit the hand later. While the pattern of hilt and blade design of this type might readily be called a "Viking sword", to do so would be to neglect the widespread popularity it enjoyed. All over continental Europe between the 8th and 10th centuries, this design and its variations could be found. Many of the best blades were of Frankish origin, given hilts in local centres. These blades had significantly better balance.

During Norman times, the blade's length increased by around 10 cm (4 in), and the hilt changed significantly. Instead of the Brazil-nut pommel, a thick disc-shaped pommel was attached "on-edge" to the bottom of the iron hilt. In addition the upper guard grew substantially from the near-absent design predating it. Also, the blades tended to taper slightly less than those found in the time of the Vikings.

Jan Petersen, in De Norske Vikingsverd (The Norwegian Viking Swords, 1919), introduced the most widely used classification of swords of the Viking Age, describing 26 types labelled A–Z. In 1927, R. E. M. Wheeler condensed Petersen's typology into a simplified typology of nine groups, numbered I–IX.

=== Norman swords ===
The transition from the Viking Age spatha-inspired sword to the High Medieval knightly sword took place between the 10th and 11th centuries. The main development was the growth of the front handguard into a full cross-guard, and the reduction of the typical Viking Age lobated pommel into simpler brazil nut or disc shapes. The sword of Otto III, (total length 95.5 cm), preserved as a relic in Essen, is an example of the emerging arming sword, although it has been encrusted with decorations during the ensuing centuries.

== See also ==
- Pugio
- Viking Age arms and armour

== Sources ==
- Ewart Oakeshott, The Archaeology of Weapons, Barnes & Noble, 1994, ISBN 1-56619-596-9. The book was copyrighted in 1960.
