= Andrew Ferrara =

Sword-Blade

Andrew Ferrara or Andrea Ferrara was a type of sword-blade that was highly esteemed in Scotland in the sixteenth and seventeenth centuries. Sir Walter Scott notes that the name of Andrea de Ferrara was inscribed "on all the Scottish broadswords that are accounted of peculiar excellence".

Andrea Ferrara was born in Fonzaso in Italy (which is located in the province of Belluno-Dolomiti) and was an active and esteemed producer before and after his staying in Scotland (the ruins of his workshop are in Belluno in the place called Busighel, near the river Ardo). This confirms the general belief reported by Scott that Ferrara was a Spanish or Italian artificer who was brought to Scotland in the early sixteenth century by James IV to instruct the Scots in the manufacture of the high-quality steel blades current in Renaissance Europe.

According to some sources the name of the manufacturer was Andrea dei Ferrari of Belluno, according to others, Andrew Ferrars or Ferrier of Arbroath.

The term came to be used generically as a term for the Scottish basket-hilted broadsword. If the sword was of high quality it was referred to as a "true Andrew Ferrara". Grose says "the common name of the claymore, or Highland broad sword".

His method of manufacture remains much a mystery, but it is suspected that they were made by interlamination, a process of welding the blade in alternate layers of iron and steel. The blades were special in their extreme flexibility. It is said that Ferrara himself always carried one wrapped up in his bonnet. The blades rarely broke, even under immense force and when used to deal horizontal blows.

== See also ==
- Scottish broadsword
- Claymore
- Historical fencing in Scotland
