= Uasal =

Uasal was a rare Irish language feminine given name which was used during the medieval period.

== People ==
- Duine uasal Suibhne, died 643.

== See also ==
- List of Irish-language given names
- Duine uasal
