= Claymore =

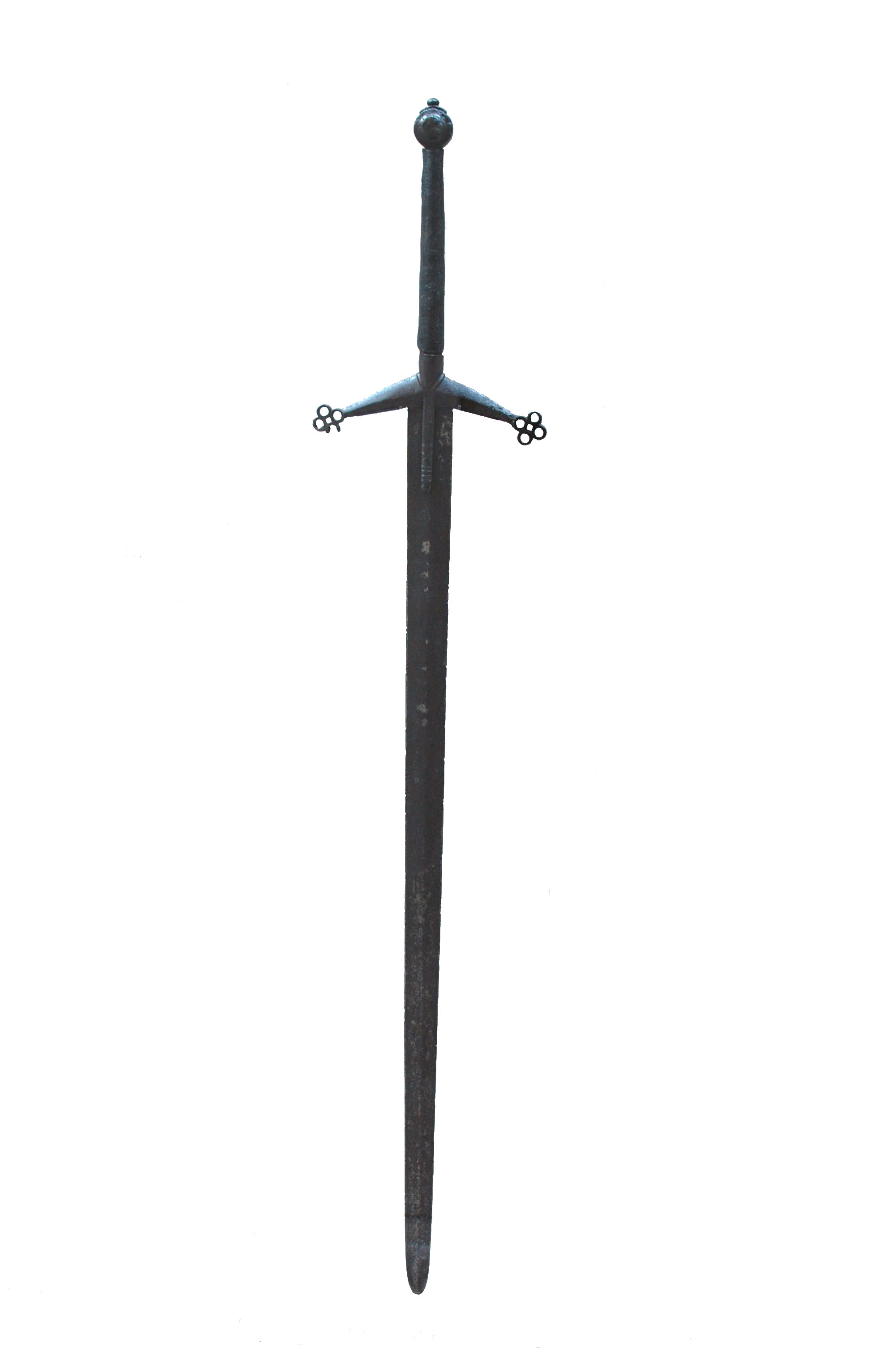
- 16th-century claymore in the National Museum of Scotland.
- Type: Two-handed sword
- Place of origin: Scotland

Service history
- In service: c. 1400–1700
- Used by: Highland Scots

Specifications
- Mass: ≈2.2–2.8 kg (4.9–6.2 lb)
- Length: ≈120–140 cm (47–55 in)
- Blade length: ≈100–120 cm (39–47 in)
- Blade type: Double-edged
- Hilt type: Two-handed cruciform, with pommel

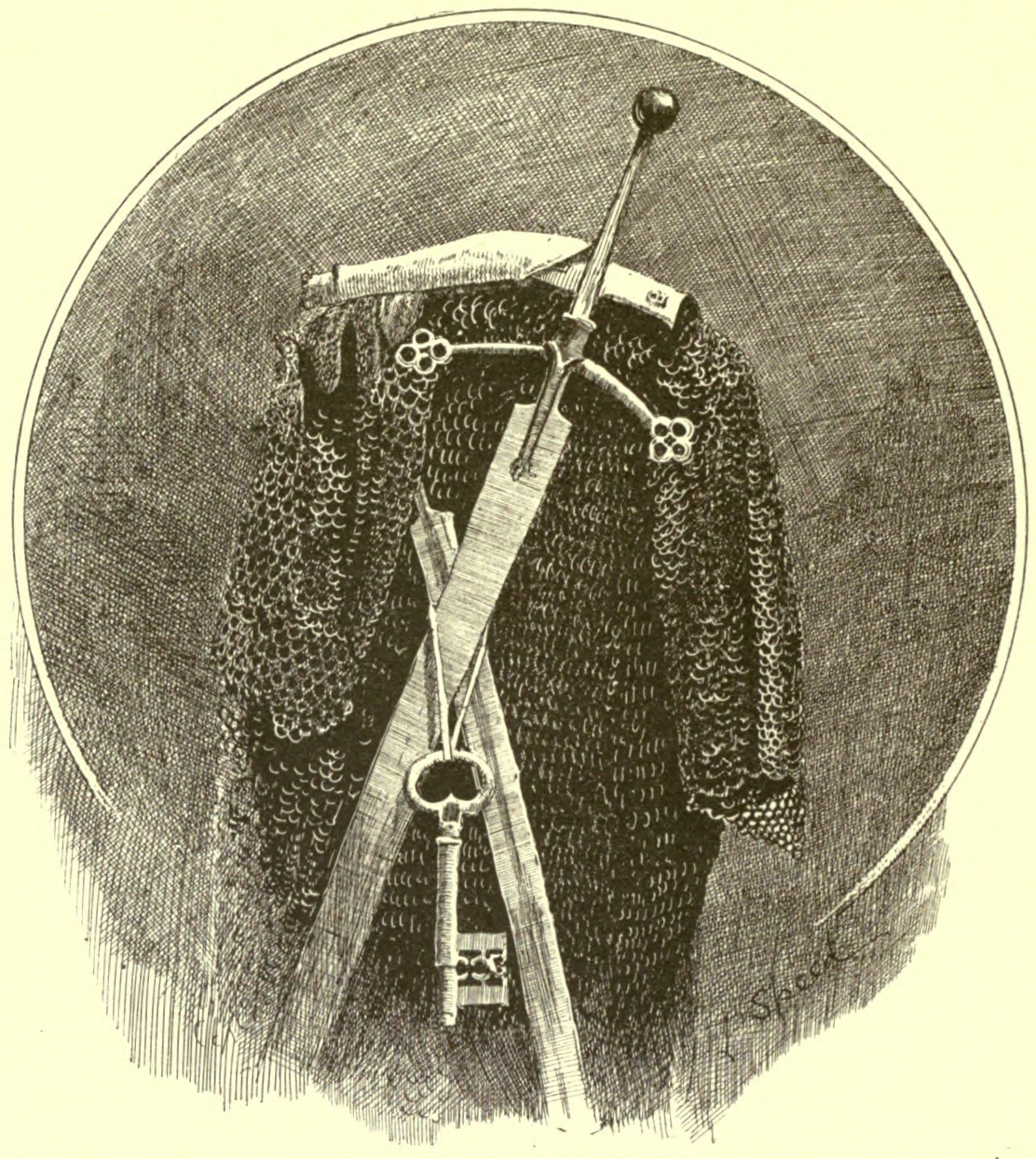
Engraving of a claymore and armour at Dunvegan Castle (from Footsteps of Dr. Johnson, 1890).

A claymore (/ˈkleɪmɔːr/; from Scottish Gaelic: claidheamh-mòr, "great sword") is either the Scottish variant of the late medieval two-handed sword or the Scottish variant of the basket-hilted sword. The former is characterised as having a cross hilt of forward-sloping quillons with quatrefoil terminations and was in use from the 15th to 17th centuries.

The word claymore was first used in reference to basket-hilted swords during the 18th century in Scotland and parts of England. This description was maybe not used during the 17th century, when basket-hilted swords were the primary military swords across Europe, but these basket-hilted, broad-bladed swords remained in service with officers of Scottish regiments into the 21st century. After the Acts of Union in 1707 (when Scottish and English regiments were integrated together), the swords were seen as a mark of distinction by Scottish officers over the more slender sabres used by their English contemporaries: a symbol of physical strength and prowess, and a link to the historic Highland way of life.

== Terminology ==
The term claymore is an anglicisation of the Gaelic claidheamh-mòr "big/great sword", attested in 1772 (as Cly-more) with the gloss "great two-handed sword". The sense "basket-hilted sword" is contemporaneous, attested in 1773 as "the broad-sword now used ... called the Claymore, (i.e., the great sword)", although OED observes that this usage is "inexact, but very common". The 1911 Encyclopædia Britannica likewise judged that the term is "wrongly" applied to the basket-hilted sword.

Countering this view, Paul Wagner and Christopher Thompson argue that the term "claymore" was applied first to the basket-hilted broadsword, and then to all Scottish swords. They provide quotations that are earlier than those given above in support of its use to refer to a basket-hilted broadsword and targe: "a strong handsome target, with a sharp pointed steel, of above half an ell in length, screw'd into the navel of it, on his left arm, a sturdy claymore by his side" (1715 pamphlet). They also note its use as a battle-cry as early as 1678. Some authors suggest that claybeg should be used instead, from a purported Gaelic claidheamh beag "small sword". This does not parallel Scottish Gaelic usage. According to the Gaelic Dictionary by R. A. Armstrong (1825), claidheamh mòr "big/great sword" translates to "broadsword", and claidheamh dà làimh to "two-handed sword", while claidheamh beag "small sword" is given as a translation of "Bilbo".

== Two-handed (Highland) claymore ==
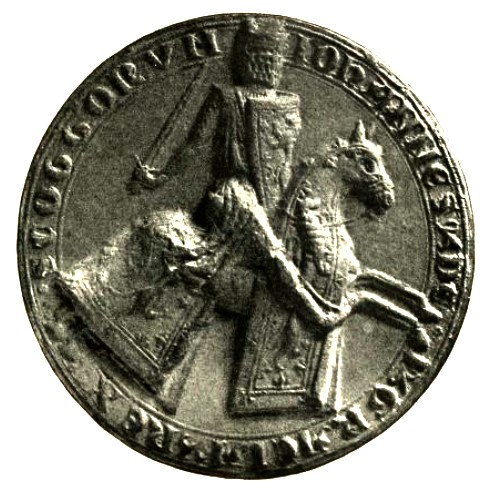
The seal of John Balliol

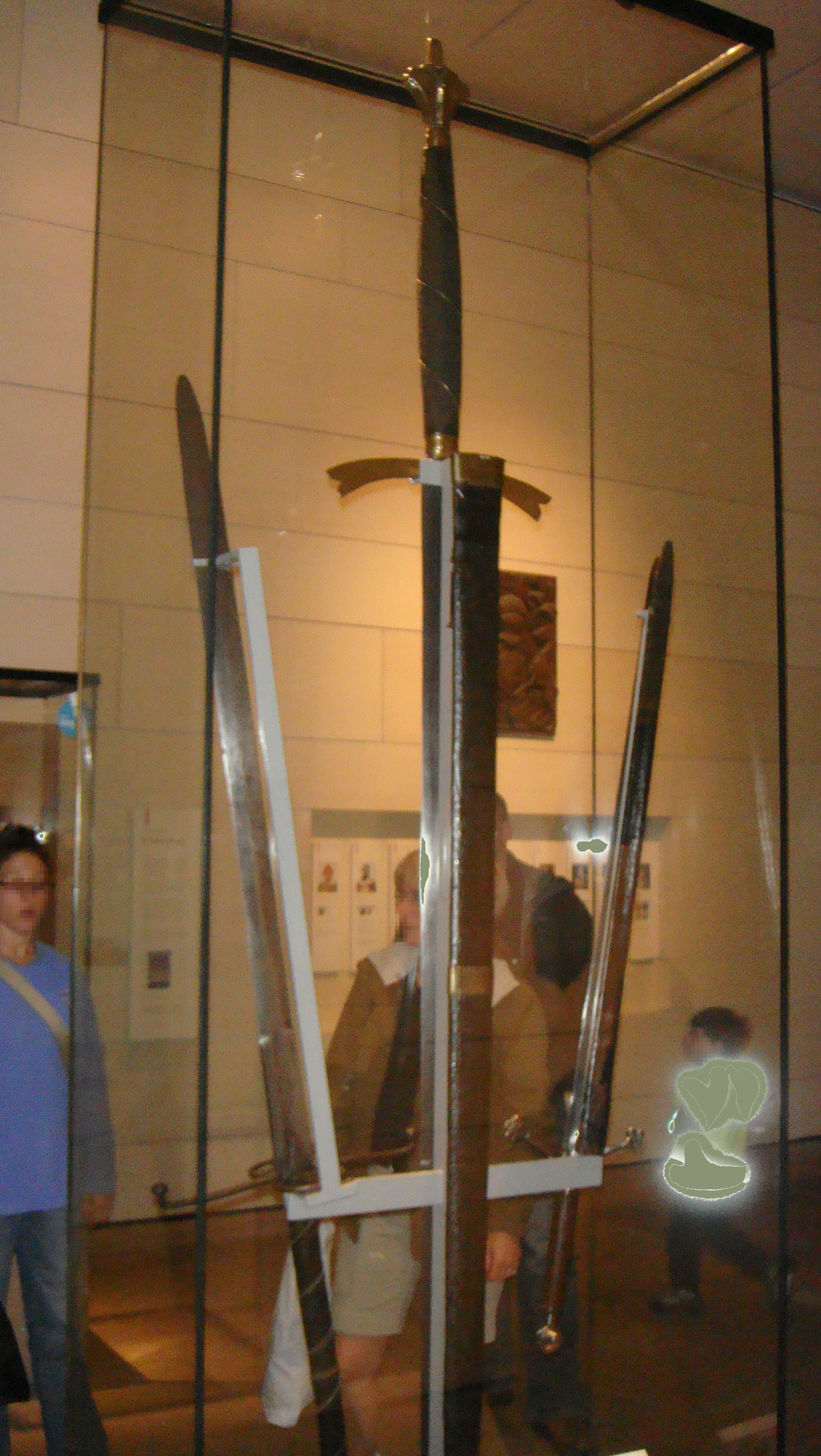
Over-sized sword, likely a bearing sword, situated next to two normal-sized claymores for scale

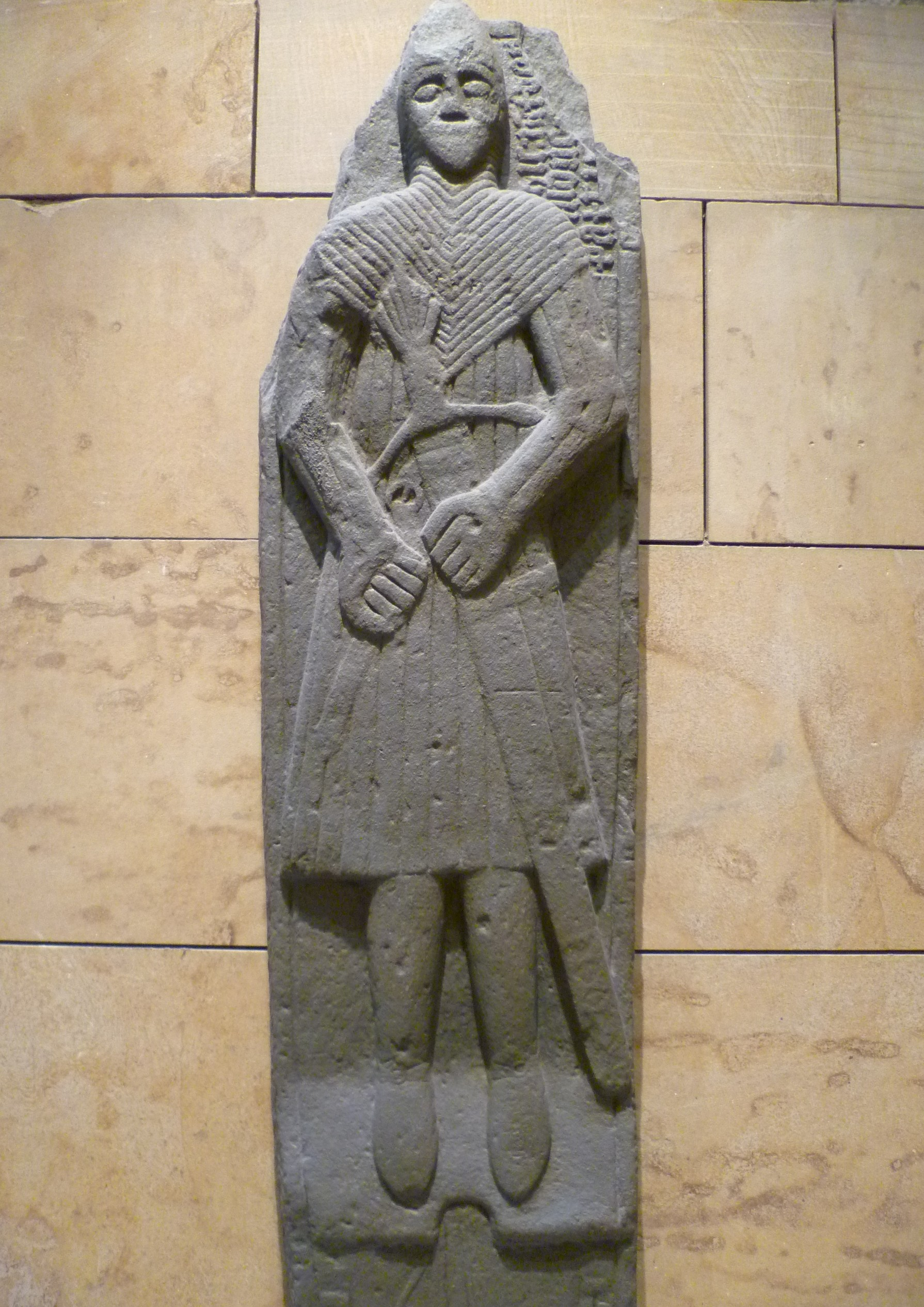
A mid-sixteenth-century tomb effigy from Finlaggan

The two-handed claymore was a large sword used in the late Medieval and early modern periods. It was used in the constant clan warfare and border fights with the English from c. 1400 to 1700. Although claymores existed as far back as the Wars of Scottish Independence, they were smaller and few had the typical quatrefoil design (as can be seen on the Great Seal of John Balliol King of Scots). The last known battle in which it is considered to have been used in a significant number was the Battle of Killiecrankie in 1689. It was somewhat longer than other two-handed swords of the era. The English did use swords similar to the Claymore during the renaissance called a greatsword. The two-handed claymore seems to be an offshoot of early Scottish medieval longswords (similar to the espee de guerre or grete war sword) which had developed a distinctive style of a cross-hilt with forward-angled arms that ended in spatulate swellings. The lobed pommels on earlier swords were inspired by the Viking style. The spatulate swellings were later frequently made in a quatrefoil design.

The average claymore ran about 140 cm (55 in) in overall length, with a 33 cm (13 in) grip, 107 cm (42 in) blade, and a weight of approximately 5.5 pounds (2.5 kg). For instance, in 1772 Thomas Pennant described a sword seen on his visit to Raasay as: "an unwieldy weapon, two inches broad (2 in (51 mm)), doubly edged; the length of the blade three feet seven inches (3 ft 7 in (1.09 m)); of the handle, fourteen inches (14 in (360 mm)); of a plain transverse guard, one foot (1 ft (0.30 m)); the weight six pounds and a half (6 lb 8 oz (2.9 kg))."

Fairly uniform in style, the sword was set with a wheel pommel often capped by a crescent-shaped nut and a guard with straight, forward-sloping arms ending in quatrefoils, and langets running down the centre of the blade from the guard. Another common style of two-handed claymore (though lesser known today) was the "clamshell-hilted" claymore. It had a crossguard that consisted of two downward-curving arms and two large, round, concave plates that protected the foregrip. It was so named because the round guards resembled an open clam.

== Popular culture references ==
- The song "Tweedle Dee, Tweedle Dum" by the Scottish band Middle of the Road mentions Scottish warriors going to battle with "claymores in their hands".
- Drew McIntyre's finishing move in WWE is known as the Claymore Kick. McIntyre has also entered matches with a claymore sword named 'Angela' after his late mother.
- The video game Team Fortress 2 features an unlockable, haunted claymore known as the "Eyelander" and a Zweihänder misleadingly named the "Claidheamh Mòr".
- In the Star Trek: The Original Series episode "Day of the Dove", the character Chief Engineer Scott finds and keeps a claymore when the ship's weapons are replaced by antique weaponry.
- In the video game For Honor, the character Highlander wields a claymore.
- The claymore is a recurring weapon in the Dark Souls video game series.
- In the 2023 remake of Super Mario RPG, one of the weapon-themed bosses is named Claymorton.
- In the video game Genshin Impact, the claymore is one of the five weapon classes which can be used by the game’s characters.
- The American Rock band Ween sings about a claymore in their song titled "The Blarney Stone" from their 1997 album titled The Mollusk.
- In the 1995 film Braveheart, William Wallace carried a claymore. At the end of the film, the claymore was tossed onto the fields of Bannockburn and was stuck point down in the ground. Final image of the film showed the claymore still stuck in the empty grassy field.
- In the 2001 dark fantasy shōnen manga Claymore, written and illustrated by Norihiro Yagi, a group of female warriors are called "Claymores" due to use of the weapon.

== See also ==
- Great sword
- Historical fencing in Scotland
- Zweihänder

== References and further reading ==
- Claude Blair, "Claymore" in David H. Caldwell (ed.), Scottish Weapons and Fortifications (Edinburgh 1981), 378–387
- David H. Caldwell, The Scottish Armoury (Edinburgh 1979), 24–26
- Fergus Cannan, Scottish Arms and Armour (Oxford 2009), 29–31, 79, 82
- Tobias Capwell, The Real Fighting Stuff: Arms and Armour at Glasgow Museums (Glasgow 2007), 84
- Ross Cowan, Halflang and Tua-Handit: Late Medieval Scottish Hand-and-a-Half and Two-Handed Swords. Updated version of two articles originally published in Medieval Warfare 1.2 & 1.3 (2011).
- Ross Cowan, 'Lairds of Battle', Military History Monthly 32 (2013), 47–48
- G. A. Hayes-McCoy, 'Sixteenth Century Swords Found in Ireland', Journal of the Royal Society of Antiquaries of Ireland 78 (1948), 38–54
- J. G. Mann, 'A Late Medieval Sword from Ireland', Antiquaries Journal 24 (1944), 94–99
- John Wallace, Scottish Swords and Dirks: An Illustrated Reference to Scottish Edged Weapons (London 1970), 10–17
- Dwelly's Illustrated Gaelic to English Dictionary (Gairm Publications, Glasgow, 1988, p. 202)
