= Historical fencing in Scotland =

Historical Fencing in Scotland
- Focus: Scottish basket-hilted broadsword
- Country of origin: Scotland
- Creator: Historical
- Famous practitioners: William Machrie, Sir William Hope, Donald McBane, Thomas Page, Archibald MacGregor, Sergeant Donald McAlpine, Henry Angelo, John Taylor, Thomas Mathewson

There is some evidence on historical fencing as practised in Scotland in the Early Modern Era, especially fencing with the Scottish basket-hilted broadsword during the 17th to 18th centuries.

Most of our current knowledge of these arts derives from various combative treatises or Martial arts manuals, as well as written anecdotes (i.e. battle accounts, folklore, etc.) and artistic representations from different periods and locations in Scottish history (see Penicuik Sketches).

== Scottish fencing masters ==
The following is a list of fencing masters that were very influential in their day, and have contributed to our current knowledge of the martial practices of Scotland (see Combat Treatises below):

- William Machrie – a Scottish fencing master who taught in Aberdeen and Edinburgh, Scotland in the late 17th, and early 18th centuries. He was also known as "Judge and Arbitrator of all who make any publick Trial of Skill in the Noble Art of the Sword, within the Kingdom of Scotland".
- Sir William Hope (1660–1724) – a Scottish fencing master who wrote a number of books on fencing, his most important works being the "New Method" (dedicated to William Keith, 9th Earl Marischal of Scotland), and the "Vade-Mecum".
- Donald McBane (1664–c.1730) – Born in Inverness, Donald joined the British Army, fought in the Highlands and in Europe where he opened a number of fencing schools. Donald later wrote a book on his extensive experience in swordsmanship and his life in the army.
- Captain James Miller – a Scottish fencing master who dedicated part of his treatise of 1735 to John Campbell, 2nd Duke of Argyll.
- Thomas Page – an English shop owner who served in the Norwich Artillery Company, raised in January 1746 for the defense of the City against possible invasion during the Jacobite Rebellion in 1746. He dedicated his Broadsword treatise to John Hobart, 1st Earl of Buckinghamshire, Lord Lieutenant of the County of Norfolk.
- Donald McAlpine – A Sergeant in Captain Archibald Campbell's Company in the 78th Fraser's Highlanders during the Seven Years' War. In 1769 he moved from Scotland to Boston, Massachusetts and there established a fencing academy. Among his students were the likes of Robert Hewes (cousin to George Robert Twelves Hewes), an early American revolutionary.
- Captain G. Sinclair – An officer in the 42nd (Royal Highland) Regiment of Foot, or Black Watch, during the late 1700s. He wrote two treatises on the Broadsword or Singlestick, "Anti-Pugilism" in 1790, and a later revision/renaming of the same treatise under the title 'Cudgel-Playing Modernized and Improved' in 1800.
- Archibald MacGregor – Archibald MacGregor was a Paisley fencing master who toured Scotland in the late 1700s giving lectures and instruction on the sword. One of his lectures was published under the name MacGregor´s Lecture on the Art of Defence, published by J. Nielson (1791). [PDF]
- Henry Angelo (c.1760–1839) – Son of Italian fencing master Domenico Angelo, Henry and his son (also Henry) were Broadsword masters to the Light Horse Volunteers of London and Westminster at the time he wrote his treatise in 1799, which they dedicate to Colonel Herries.
- John Taylor – Served as Broadsword Master to the Light Horse Volunteers of London and Westminster. His ten lesson system is shown in the works of Henry Angelo (1799) and Charles Roworth (1804).
- Thomas Mathewson – an Englishman who taught the art of Scottish Broadsword. He wrote his treatise in 1805.

== Fencing manuals ==
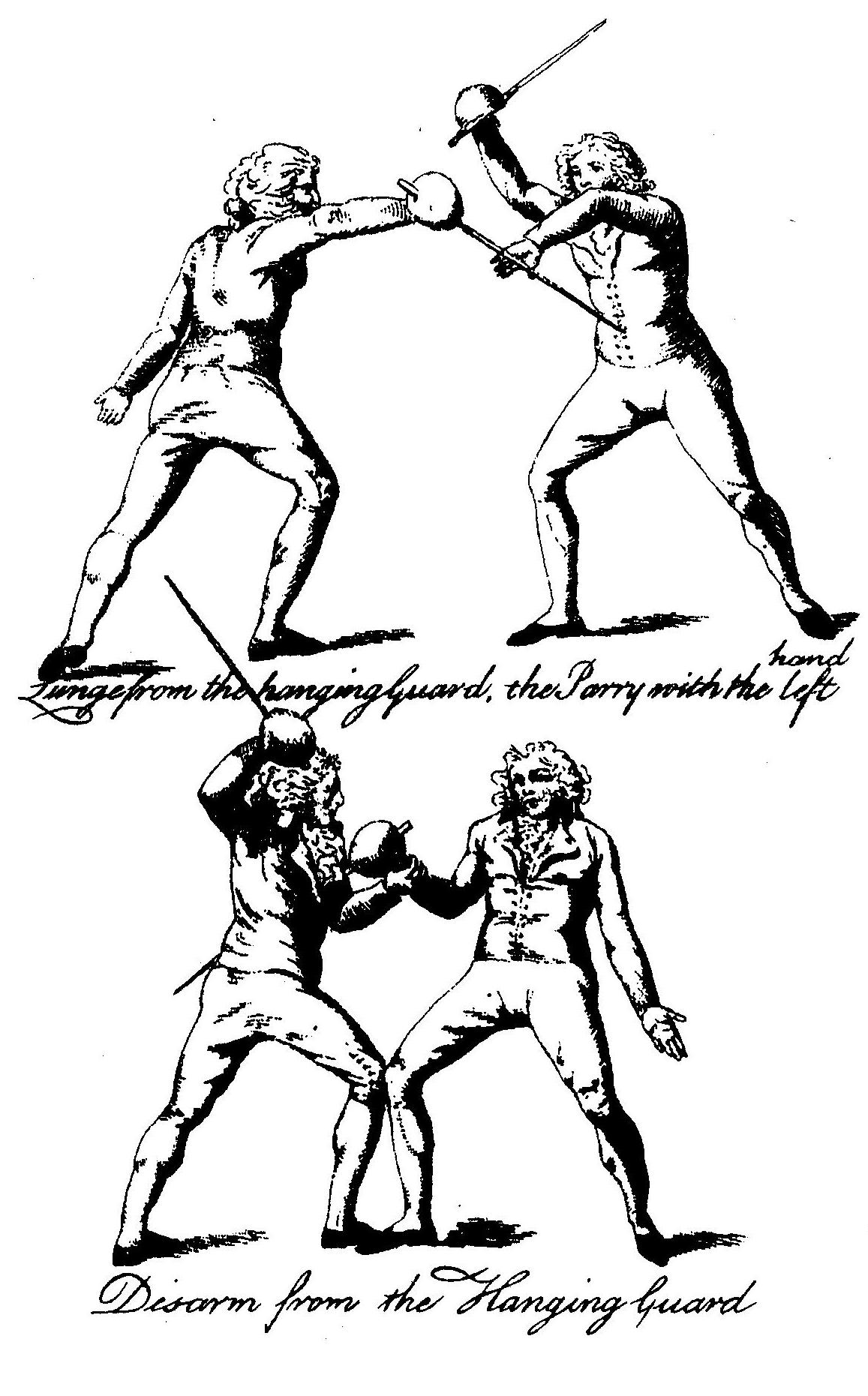
Different positions from the Hanging Guard, from Captain G. Sinclair's "Anti Pugilism"

Scottish fencing manuals detailing the use of the basket-hilted Scottish broadsword (besides other disciplines including the smallsword and spadroon and, to a lesser extent, the targe, dirk and quarterstaff) were published throughout the 18th century, with early and late examples dating to the late 17th and early 19th centuries, respectively:

- The Scots Fencing Master (the Complete Smallswordsman) – Sir William Hope (1687)
- Advice to his Scholar from the Fencing Master – Sir William Hope (1692)
- Complete Fencing Master – Sir William Hope (1691–1692)
- The Swordsman's Vade-Mecum – Sir William Hope (1692)
- New Short and Easy Method of Fencing (1st Edition) – Sir William Hope (1707)
- New Short and Easy Method of Fencing (2nd Edition) – Sir William Hope (1714)
- A Few Observations upon the Fighting for Prizes in the Bear Gardens – Sir William Hope (1715)
- A Vindication of the True Art of Self-Defence – Sir William Hope (1724)
- Expert Swords-man's Companion – Donald McBane (1728)
- A treatise on backsword, sword, buckler, sword and dagger, sword and great gauntlet, falchion, quarterstaff – Captain James Miller (1737)
- The Use of the Broad Sword – Thomas Page (1746)
- A Dictionary Explaining the Terms, Gards and Positions, used in the Art of the Small Sword – Hary Fergusson (1767)
- The Sword's-man – John Ferdinand (1788)
- Anti-Pugilism – Anonymous (Captain G. Sinclair, 1790)
- Lecture on the Art of Defence – Archibald MacGregor (1791)
- Treatise on the New Sword Exercise, for Cavalry – Sholto Sorlie (1797)
- The Art of Defence on Foot with Broad Sword and Sabre, by C. Roworth (1798)
- The Guards of the Highland Broadsword – Henry Angelo, art by Thomas Rowlandson (20 January 1799)
- Hungarian & Highland Broadsword – by Henry Angelo and Son (12 February 1799)
- Ten Divisions of the Highland Broadsword – Henry Angelo (20 June 1799)
- Cudgel Playing Modernized and Improved; or, The Science of Defence, Exemplified in a Few Short and Easy Lessons, for the Practice of the Broad Sword or Single Stick, on Foot – Captain G. Sinclair (1800)
- Lecture on the Art of Defence – Archibald MacGregor (1791)
- The Art of Defence with Broad Sword and Sabre, by C. Roworth (1804 & 1824)
- Fencing Familiarized; or, a New Treatise on the Art of the Scotch Broad Sword – Thomas Mathewson (1805)

== Techniques ==
The Highland Broadsword texts of the 1700s portray 7 cuts and numerous guards. The footwork is sword leg forward (usually right leg) with the other leg behind, similar to modern fencing. Traversing footwork allows one to step off the center-line of attack, either to right or left. The following Guards are listed in these texts:

- Inside Guard: Defends the left side of your face (or if you are left handed, the right side of your face)
- Outside Guard: Defends the right side of your face (i.e. sword arm side). Typically one's default guard.
- Medium Guard: A stationary position that defends cuts from neither outside or inside one's line of defense, but is in wait to shift to either Inside or Outside Guard. Tip is usually facing up, but in Mathewson's treatise, the tip is aimed at the opponent, and the body is in a lunging position.
- Hanging Guard: Another default guard that defends the head, but can also shift easily into other guards. Hilt is held above head, with tip facing diagonally down to the left side.
- St. George Guard (a.k.a. "Cross Guard"): A horizontal guard defending the top of one's head.
- Half-Hanging Guard: Similar to the hanging guard, but held lower to defend a cut 4.
- Half-circle Guard (a.k.a. "Spadroon Guard"): Similar to Half-Hanging guard, but the tip hangs to the right, and defends against a cut at the wrist (i.e. Cut 3). One may also hold the guard above the head and defend a cut at the right side of the head, similar to the regular Hanging Guard.
- Inside Half-Hanger: Defends a cut at the belly (i.e. Cut 5), and the tip hangs straight down, hilt held to the left side.
- Outside Half-Hanger: Defends a cut at the ribs on one's back (i.e. Cut 6), and the tip hangs straight down, hilt held to the right side.

The Cuts are as follows:

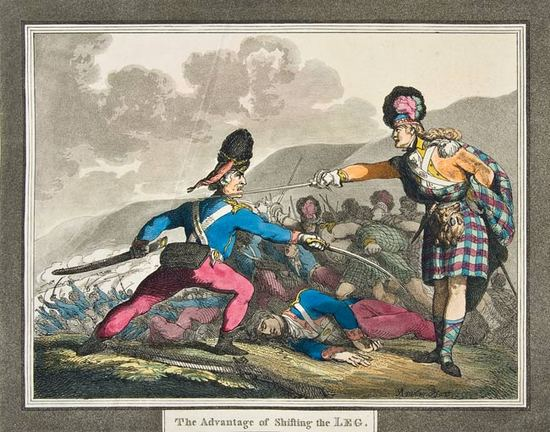
The Advantage of Shifting the Leg, from Henry Angelo & Son's "Hungarian and Highland Broadsword", 1799

- Cut 1: Diagonal downward cut aimed at the left side of an opponent's face
- Cut 2: Diagonal downward cut aimed at the right side of an opponent's face
- Cut 3: Diagonal upward cut aimed at the left side of an opponent's wrist
- Cut 4: Diagonal upward cut aimed at the right side of an opponent's wrist or knee
- Cut 5: Horizontal cut aimed at an opponent's belly from their left side
- Cut 6: Horizontal cut aimed at an opponent's ribs from their right side
- Cut 7: Vertical cut aimed straight down at an opponent's head (note: this cut doesn't appear in all of the Scottish fencing manuals)

Shifting the Leg: When an opponent cuts at the outside of your leg, it is prudent to step back (and thus avoid the cut at the leg), counter-attacking with either a cut at the head or at the wrist simultaneous to shifting the leg. This technique was taught by Angelo, Taylor and Roworth.

== Famous Scottish duellists ==
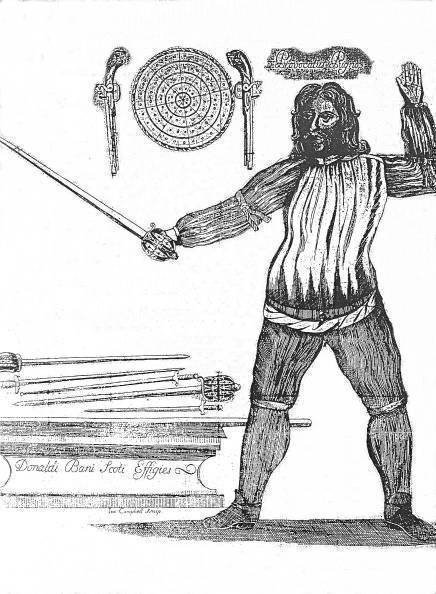
Portrait of Donald McBane, Scottish Fencing Master, from Donald McBane's "The Expert Swordsman's Companion". The portrait reads "Donaldi Bani Scoti Effigies". This image portrays McBane in the "Inside Guard" with a Broadsword, while the table next to him has both Broadswords and Smallswords. The wall behind him has a Targe with flintlock pistols on each side

In the 17th–18th century, there were a number of warriors and soldiers that developed a reputation as skilled duellists. In the highlands, they were known as Caterans, and were noted for cattle theft as well as black-mail, and often traveled to different villages challenging them to produce a fighter that can best them, or pay a fee. Some belonged to the Duine uasal (Warrior Class) of their Clan:

- John (Iain) McCombie (a.k.a. McCombie Mor) – 7th Chief of Clan MacThomas, he was noted for duelling against an Italian fencer to defend the reputation of his enemy the Earl of Atholl. He joined Montrose at Dundee in 1644 and fought for the King's cause throughout the campaign.
- Ranald MacDonald, a.k.a. "Ranald of the Shield" (Raonull na Sgeithe in Gaidhlig) – The hero of 1645. He was the son of Allan MacDonald of Achtriachtan. He agreed to fight a duel with Dirk and Targe against a captured English officer that was armed with a broadsword. He won the duel, earning his title "Ranald of the Shield". He was later killed in the Massacre of Glencoe.
- "Black Allan of the Deer" ("Aillen dubh nam fiadh" in Gaidhlig) – The celebrated Daldness deer stalker. He was supposed, next to Alastair Mac Colla, to be the greatest swordsmen in Montrose's army. Upon hearing of the impending duel of Ranald (of the Shield), he rushed over to fight in his place, as Ranald was only skilled at the use of Broadsword & Targe, but not Broadsword alone. He was not permitted to take Ranald's place.
- Alasdair Mac Colla, a.k.a. "Alasdair the son of Colla the Left-handed MacDonald" ("Alasdair Mac Colla Chiotaich Mac Dhomhnaill" in Gaidhlig) – He was known as the best swordsman in the army of James Graham, 1st Marquess of Montrose, and is even believed to have been able to use a sword with either hand. He is also credited for the creation of the Highland Charge (though the Highland charge was essentially a variant of the tactics used by the Gael and Celts from a much earlier period). However, his version or refinement was much used in the wars that followed to the 1745 Rising. (There are some who believe the famed "Rebel Charge" with the battle yells that accompanied it were a sort of variation of the Highland Charge, though this is not clearly proven.
- Robert Roy MacGregor (1671–1734) – Son of Chief Donald MacGregor of Clan Gregor, he was a cateran of great repute. He was said to be the best swordsman in all the Highlands. His final duel was with Charles Stewart, 5th of Ardsheal (a laird of Clan Stewart of Appin), to whom he lost with a cut to the chin (which would later cause his death).
- Roderick (Rory) MacNeill of Barra, a.k.a. "Black Ruairidh the Unjust" – Chief of Clan MacNeil of Barra, he was known for his frequent raids from the Isle of Barra. He is said to have fenced against Rob Roy MacGregor, having his sword-arm sliced in the process (they became faithful friends after this). His life ended after a failed raid on Duart Castle, where he was mortally wounded in the heart by a dagger. However, he refused to die until his men had returned him to Castle Ciosmal in Barra, after which he died.
- Donald McBane – The noted fencing master (see above). According to his personal account, he fought against numerous men in his day, usually with victory. He is believed to have challenged Rob Roy MacGregor (under the name "Donald Ban"), who refused to fight him due to his lack of status. Even at 63 years of age, he still took up the challenge of the Irish fencer Andrew O'Bryan, whom he defeated and whose arm he broke with a Falchion.

=== Clan styles ===
It has been suggested that certain Scottish Clans and families had specific training systems that were distinct from one another. For example, it is said that some members of Clan Macdonald were ambidextrous, and were thus able to fence with either left or right hand. The Kerr family is reputed to have predominantly left-handed swordsmen such as in poems by James Hogg however a study concluded that the family has no increased incidence of left-handedness.

The Black Watch appears to be the source of Highland Broadsword technique during the later part of the 18th century, as evidenced in Captain G. Sinclair's manual.

== See also ==
- Military history of Scotland
- Andrew Ferrara
- Scottish wrestling
- Scottish sword dance
- Irish martial arts
- Western martial arts
- Dirk dance
