= Donald McBane =

Scottish soldier and fencing master

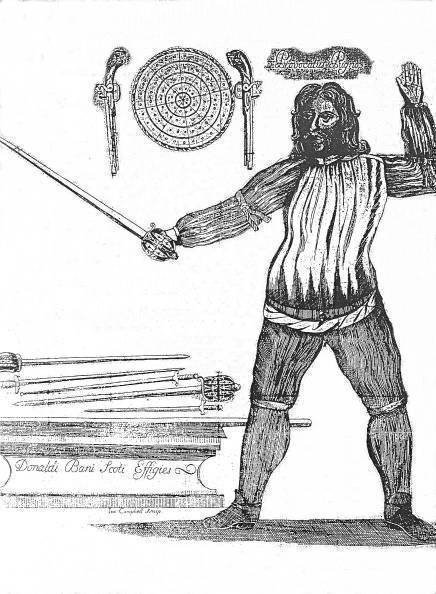
Portrait of Donald McBane, a Scottish fencing master, from Donald McBane's The Expert Swordsman's Companion (1728).

Donald McBane (1664 – 12 April 1732) was a Scottish soldier and fencing master who was known for his skill in duelling.

== Early life ==
Donald McBane was born in the Highland town of Inverness during the late seventeenth century. In 1687 McBane ran away from his apprenticeship as a tobacco spinner to enlist in the Scots Army. He indulged in some fighting between the clans of Macdonald and Macintosh, who used sword and targe, Lochaber axes, and wooden-handled bayonets in the muzzle of the guns. When his company was disbanded in 1688, McBane took service in Colonel Alexander Grant's Regiment in the pay of King William II of Scots, who had to oppose the Highland clans fighting for King James VII of Scots at the Pass of Killiecrankie in what became known as the Battle of Killiecrankie (1689).

== Fencing lessons and first duels ==
In 1691, Grant's unit was disbanded, and McBane joined Colonel James Forbes's Regiment, where an old soldier was ordered to take care of Donald and "manage his pay" for him, with the result that Donald saw little of it. When he complained to an officer he was told to fight out the dispute, as was the custom at that time. McBane thereupon paid a sergeant for private instruction in swordsmanship, borrowed a sword, and then fought his "govenor", who beat him, took his sword and pawned it. This did not discourage him, however, and McBane took more lessons in small sword versus broad sword, and a second bout (rematch) ended in McBane's victory, and his first sword was returned to him. His autobiography mentions that he "then became master of his own pay".

By 1692 McBane owned his own sword and practised at the fencing schools, publicly beating the other fencing scholars. Then, on a mission to escort a draft of soldiers bound for Flanders in Belgium, he got carried off from Leith (at Edinburgh) to Haveluy by mischance. Despite this setback, he marched from there to Maestricht and then to Brussels, where the British Army was camped. In Brussels, McBane attached himself to Lord Orkney's Royal Regiment, and he fought with that regiment at the Battle of Steenkerque in August 1692 in the Low Countries during the Nine Years' War. In 1695 as a Royal Scot he stormed Namur with the other British regiments and recovered from his wounds at Brussels. Next year, at Rotterdam, he was discovered by his former Captain, who exchanged McBane for two other men and took him back to Fort William.

In 1697 at the Peace of Ryswick his company was disbanded again so he went home to Inverness. McBane still did not want to carry on with his apprenticeship, and so with his mother's blessing, twenty shillings and a new suit of clothes, he set out to seek his fortune. He got no further than Perth before he enlisted in the Earl of Angus's Regiment to serve as a pikeman. Shortly afterwards his corporal accused him of absence off guard, and punished him with a beating. With his honour as a soldier at stake, McBane challenged the corporal to a duel. During the fight he gave the corporal a mortal wound, and because duelling was illegal, he had to flee for his life. But such was the code of honour at the time that his captain, and the dying corporal himself, aided his escape with money for a journey to Glasgow.

== Opening schools for swordsmanship ==
At Glasgow he enlisted in the Royal Regiment of Scotland, then stationed at Dublin. McBane became an assiduous student at a French school (in Dublin) where sword and foil often clashed until blood was drawn, and then a drink or two re-sealed friendship. At his next school, McBane fell out with his master about his sister, and the usual duel ensued, which he won. He became such a proficient swordsman that he set up his own school at Limerick. Then the regiment marched to Cork in order to embark for the Netherlands. On the way it seems that McBane was seen as something of a liability by his captain who detailed a sergeant and four men to guard him in case he deserted, but the captain had misjudged him since it was the escort and not McBane that deserted.

The voyage from Cork to the Netherlands took five weeks, and when he landed at Baslo in Dutch Brabant, he found there eight English battalions, eight Scottish and Dutch battalions, and eight cavalry regiments. McBane was quick to sense the opportunity of setting up a school for teaching the art of swordsmanship, and he established a good business after beating a score of duels with rival fencing masters, as well as a few murders "tolerated by their officers". He took a Swiss soldier as a servant and got pupils among both Swiss and Dutch officers.

While managing the school, McBane came to know that there was four good swordsmen in the town that kept all the women, Rota Fortunae, and Ledgerdemain (card tricks) by which they got a lot of money. Mcbane decided to have a share of that gain, and thus, he fought all four of them, one by one. While fighting the last one, who was lefthanded, his opponent took a pistol from his cockade, and fired at him, with one of the bullets going through his cravat. The fight then went into a stalemate that lasted until the night, when they agreed to give him a "Brace of Whoors and Two Petty Couns a week". With that and his school, McBane lived very well for that winter.

== Career soldier ==
As a career soldier, he served throughout much of Europe, fighting in the War of the Spanish Succession (1701–1714), and taking part in fifteen skirmishes and sixteen battles, including Blenheim (1704) and Malplaquet (1709). McBane served in the Royal Regiment till the end of the war in 1712, and was recommended by his Colonel for the Chelsea Hospital). By the time of the Jacobite Rising of 1715, he was serving as a sergeant in General Honeywood’s Regiment of Dragoons and guarded the Colours at the Battle of Preston. Again he was recommended for Chelsea, but preferred another job as a gunner at Fort William. His autobiography mentions that at one point he had the command responsibility equivalent to a Colonel of Artillery, but it is unlikely he ever received an officer's commission. His Colonel made several recommendations for McBane to 'Chailcie College' (The Royal Hospital Chelsea), something only open to senior non-commissioned or warrant officers.

McBane also worked as a fencing master, and claimed to have participated in nearly one hundred duels. He fought as a gladiator at the Bear Gardens in Hockley-in-the-Hole and Marybone Fields, London, where he reportedly fought thirty-seven prizes. Among his opponents were some of the most celebrated swordsmen and fencing masters of the century, such as James Miller, Timothy Buck, and James Figg.

== Later life ==
In 1726, in a duel at Edinburgh, McBane gave his opponent seven wounds and broke his arm with a falchion. He said that he did it "at the request of several noblemen and gentlemen". Donald was now 63 and resolved to retire. He died on 12 April 1732.

== Legacy ==
McBane is best known for his book, The Expert Sword-Man's Companion (1728). The book includes McBane's memoirs as well as his extensive treatise on the art of fencing, and is a major source for the study of Scottish swordsmanship. McBane's life and writings are featured in a number of classic works on fencing, including Egerton Castle's Schools and Masters of Fence (1892) and Captain Alfred Hutton's The Sword and the Centuries (1901). Hutton describes McBane as a "first class swordsman," and,

Unlike the majority of his class, he was something of a scholar, for he left behind him a work, “The Expert Swordman’s Companion,” which contains a number of wise lessons for both the small and back sword; but perhaps the most interesting part of it is the account he gives of his life when serving in Flanders under the great Duke of Marlborough. There is a rough quaintness in the style of his narrative that adds flavour to the curious anecdotes of fights in which he was engaged.

The British historian J. D. Aylward called McBane's memoir "possibly, the most ingenuous autobiography in the English language."
