= The Art of Defence on Foot with the Broad Sword and Sabre =

Manual of instruction for British military infantry swordsmanship

The Art of Defence on Foot was first published in 1798. It is a detailed manual of instruction for British military infantry swordsmanship. It is the oldest known British manual intended to teach purely military swordsmanship on foot. Four editions were printed between 1798 and 1824, the first three in London, UK and the last in New York, United States.

Known colloquially by its acronym AOD, the manual teaches a universal system of swordsmanship that is applicable to all military swords used on foot at that time. This includes the Broad Sword, Sabre, Spadroon and Hanger. It also includes a section on walking stick defence and opposing bayonets with a sword.

The AOD system is a predominately linear (footwork) system that is deeply grounded in the back, broad and sheering (spadroon) sword sources of the late 17th and early 18th century. It utilises a parry-riposte system, where a strong defence is commonly made before responding with an attack. Extensive use of slipping (withdrawing the target your enemy aims at) and shifting (withdrawing the lead leg) is integral to the system. Attacks are broken down to a simple six cut system as first shown in Gaspard La Marchant’s official ‘Rules and Regulations for the Sword Exercise of the Cavalry’, of 1796. Roworth’s system also includes a range of traversing steps, thrusts and grapples.

Roworth’s manual was never officially recognised by the British military. However, it was published at a time when there was no official manual for infantry exercise, and as such was recommended by many civilian and military publications of the time. The system shown is also very closely related with the Angelo’s, who went on to teach and create official military manuals on civilian swordsmanship that were used extensively throughout the 19th century.

== Author – Charles Roworth ==
The Art of Defence is sometimes incorrectly attributed to John Taylor, a sword master whose ten lesson structure was added by Roworth in his third edition (see below). Charles Roworth was a popular printer in London, who printed many military works, as well as other written works, including those of Jane Austen. He served in the Royal Westminster Volunteers, a militia unit whose job it was to maintain order and protect the country in case of invasion.

== Second Edition (1798) ==
The second edition was published in the same year as the first and has few changes. The most significant is the removal of the ‘Inside Guard 2nd Position’ plate and description. It was effectively replaced with the half circle or spadroon guard, as is shown in Angelo’s 1799 work.

== Third edition and John Taylor (1804) ==
In 1804 a third edition of the AOD was released. The most significant change in this manual was the addition of the ’10 lessons of John Taylor’. Taylor’s lesson’s and manual exercise (solo drill) were depicted in Henry Angelo’s work in 1799, forming the entire basis of his infantry system. Those depicted in Roworth’s manual are altered slightly. The most significant change being the implementation of thrusts in the lessons. The third edition also advises the swordsmen to keep the point of the sword directed at their opponent’s eye in the typical guard positions, as opposed to previous editions, where the blade was directed 6-8 inches above their head. This may speak to the increasing emphasis on the use of the point. A fact that is supported by the changes to the ten lessons of Taylor.

John Taylor never published any works of his own, though is referenced in both Angelo and Roworth's work. He was sword master to the First Life Guards, and Sergeant and Sword master to the London and Westminster Light Horse Volunteers. He taught military swordsmanship at his fencing academy in Fish Street Hill, London, in the early 19th century.

== Fourth Edition (1824) ==
Published in New York, USA in 1824. This edition is a re-print of the 1804 third edition. The artwork was re-drawn but is a close copy.

== Roworth v Wilkes ==
A landmark legal case in copyright law ensued in 1807 when Roworth claimed Wilkes had reproduced most of his work in the latter’s ‘Encyclopaedia Londinensis,’ Wilkes had reproduced over one hundred pages of Roworth’s work, including plates. Roworth used Henry Angelo as an expert witness and was ultimately successful.

== Use in Historical Fencing/HEMA ==
Roworth’s manual is a key source for those practicing British Military Swordsmanship of the late 18th and early 19th century, as well as those studying American military swordsmanship of the 19th century. This is a subject followed by a number in the HEMA (Historical European Martial Arts) community, as a martial art.

Discussion on Roworth’s work can often be found on the Facebook groups ‘Spadrooners’, ‘Military and Classical Sabre’ and ‘International Sabre Symposium’.

== Modern Reproductions of the Manuals ==
- Art of Defence, First Edition, Fallen Book Publishing
- Art of Defence, Second Edition, free PDF
- Art of Defence, Third Edition, FreeLance Academy Press
- Art of Defence, Fourth Edition, free PDF
