= Royal Westminster Volunteers =

Regiment of the British Volunteer Corps

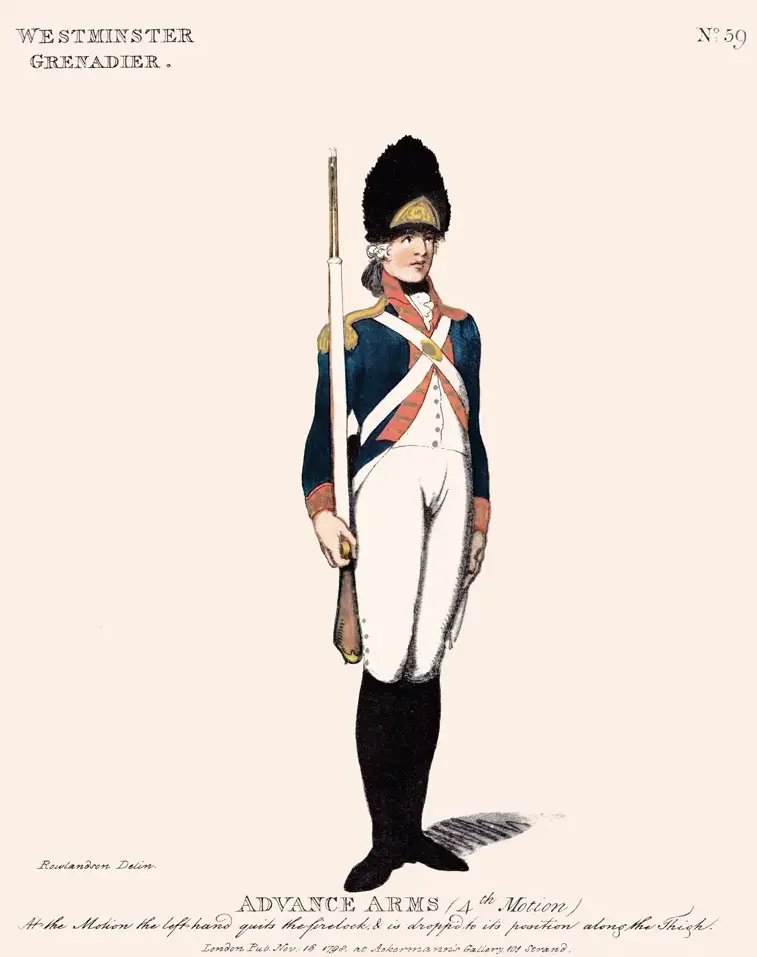
1798 engraving of a regimental grenadier private

The Royal Westminster Volunteers was an infantry regiment of the British Volunteer Corps. It was raised in 1787 by Colonel James Robertson as the St Anne's Volunteers, being formed in the London parish of St Anne's Soho. The regiment was raised as part of a wave of military volunteer units raised during and after the American War of Independence to defend Britain from foreign invasion. Following the formation of the Volunteer Corps in 1794 the regiment became part of the newly-established force and was renamed the "Royal Westminster Volunteers" in 1797 with George III's permission.

Consisting of two companies in 1797, by the next year it had expanded to consist of six grenadier battalions, one grenadier company and one light infantry battalion. Notable members of the regiment included the saddler and future police magistrate Richard Birnie, the pianomaker James Broadwood, the playwright Isaac Pocock and Charles Roworth, the author of The Art of Defence on Foot with the Broad Sword and Sabre. The Royal Westminster Volunteers was disbanded in 1814 following the Treaty of Paris, but was seen as a spiritual predecessor to the Queen's Westminster Rifles, to which its 1804 colours were presented on 1 June 1861.
