= Bilbo (sword) =

Sword similar to a cutlass

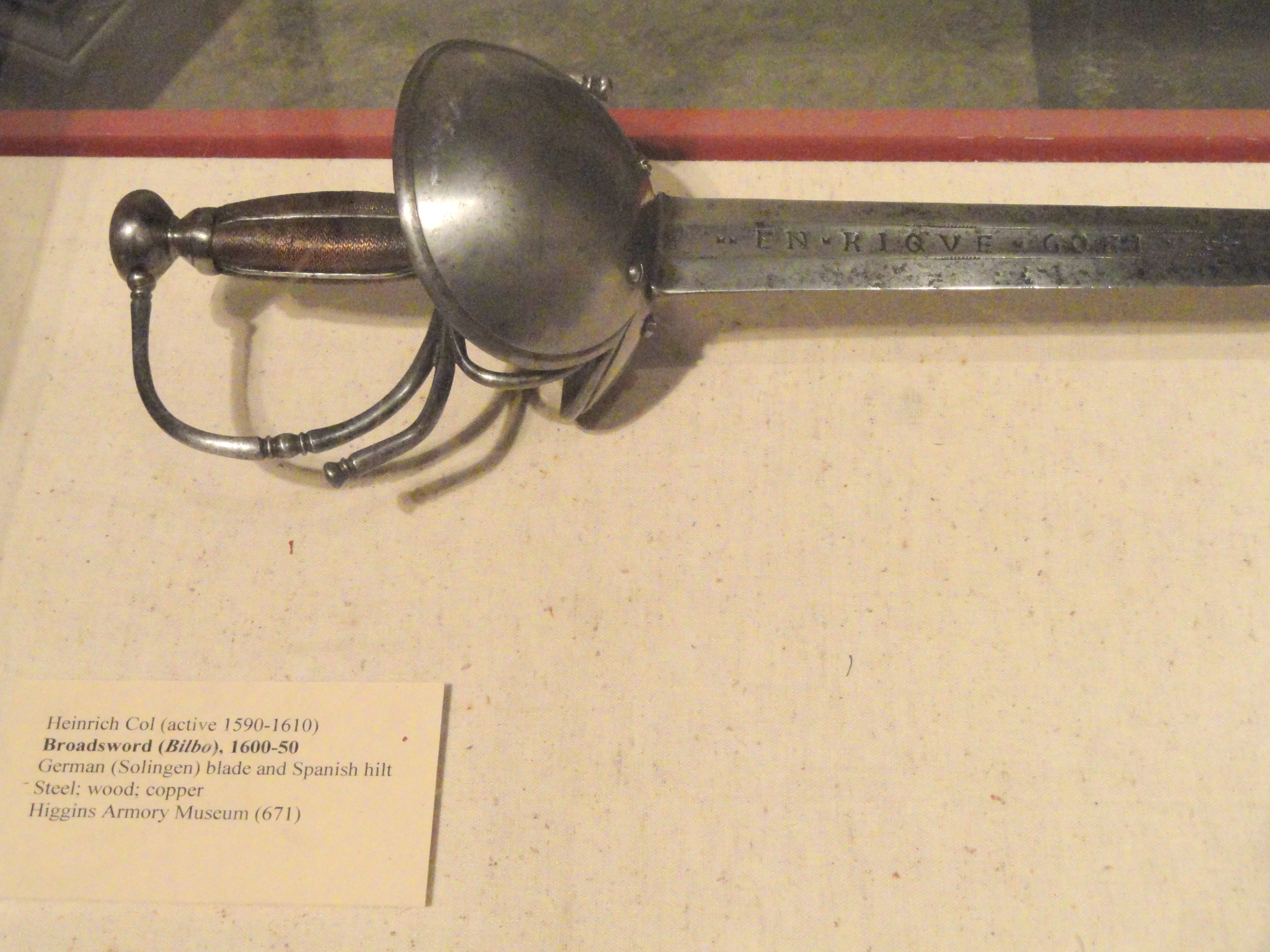
A 1600–1650 bilbo with a Solingen blade and a Spanish hilt.

The bilbo is a type of 16th century, cut-and-thrust sword or small rapier formerly popular in America. They have well-tempered and flexible blades and were very popular aboard ships, where they were used similarly to a cutlass. The term comes from the Basque city of Bilbao, Bilbo in Basque, where the metal (bilbo steel) was extracted and later sent to Toledo, a city in the center of Spain, where these swords were forged and exported to the New World. These swords were also sold to merchants of every European nation, including England.

== Etymology ==
Bilbo (Basque: labana bizkaitarra, Spanish: daga vizcaína, lit. 'Biscayne dagger') is an English catch-all word used to very generally refer to the "utilitarian" cup-hilt swords, found all over America. They usually had a wide, relatively short sturdy and well-tempered blade, were comparatively unadorned, and were considered practical and utilitarian. The grip was often covered with wire, rather than plain nut.

== See also ==
- Dirk
- Falchion
- Cutlass
