= Duine uasal =

A Duine Uasal or duin' uasal, anglicised as Dunnie-wassal etc. by Walter Scott et al., was a Highland gentleman or noble. This word generally misprinted in the Lowlands, and by Scott in his excellent ballad of Bonnie Dundee, is from the Scottish Gaelic duine meaning a "man", and "uasal" meaning "gentle, noble, or of good birth". Uasal (Wassal) is not cognate with the English language term "vassal". It is sometimes written "duin' uasal". It is the same in the Irish language, Gaeilge.

"There are wild dunnie-wassals three thousand times three
will cry oich for the bonnets o' Bonnie Dundee."
