= Carolingian church =

Christianity in the Frankish kingdoms under Carolingian rule (751-888)

The Carolingian Church encompasses the practices and institutions of Christianity in the Frankish kingdoms under the rule of the Carolingian dynasty (751-888). In the eighth and ninth centuries, Western Europe witnessed decisive developments in the structure and organisation of the church, relations between secular and religious authorities, monastic life, theology, and artistic endeavours. Christianity was the principal religion of the Carolingian Empire. Through military conquests and missionary activity, Latin Christendom expanded into new areas, such as Saxony and Bohemia. These developments owed much to the leadership of Carolingian rulers themselves, especially Charlemagne and Louis the Pious, whose courts encouraged successive waves of religious reform and viewed Christianity as a unifying force in their empire.

== Historical context ==
=== The Merovingian church ===
Carolingian Christianity was heavily influenced by their predecessors, the Merovingians. Christianity was first introduced to the Franks as they conquered Gaul and encountered Gallo-Roman culture, with Clovis I converting to Christianity in 496. The Merovingian kings worked closely with the Church, and bishops occupied spiritual and civic positions in Frankish society, as recorded in historical works such as those of Gregory of Tours. The Church played an important role in Frankish politics during this period, with competing family members often having their rival relatives or political enemies tonsured and exiled to a monastery.

The Merovingians were also instrumental in the Anglo-Saxon conversion to Christianity, with the wife of Æthelberht of Kent being the Merovingian princess Bertha. Queen Brunhild corresponded with Pope Gregory the Great, the latter praising her piety and requesting support for the mission's efforts to convert the Anglo-Saxons to Christianity.

The period also saw the regular convening of Frankish synods, in which kings frequently exercised significant influence. The practice fell into disuse during the aristocratic conflicts of the late seventh and early eighth centuries, however. In 742, the Anglo-Saxon missionary Boniface, in conjunction with the Carolingian mayors of the palace Pepin and Carloman, organised the first of a series of church councils with the express aim of remedying this deficiency.

=== Expansion of the Frankish realm ===
As the Carolingians rose in power under the rule of Charles Martel as mayor of the palace (718-741), the Frankish realm began to grow considerably. Charles Martel emerged as the strongest political figure in Francia, and the Merovingian kings were increasingly relegated to figurehead positions. He achieved great prestige from his defence against non-Christian invaders throughout his rule and brought peripheral regions such as Alemannia under Frankish control. Clearly aware of this authority, Charles Martel established his own succession whereby, upon his death in 741, the realm was divided between his sons akin to what a king would do. Charles Martel's rule had elevated his family to a more secure position of power. His son and successor Pepin III continued these efforts and, following the abdication of his brother Carloman, worked toward supplanting the Frankish king at the time, Childeric III. Pepin was successful in doing this and in 751 became the first official Carolingian king of Francia. With the monarchy now held by the Carolingians, Pepin and later his son Charlemagne were responsible for further expansion of the Frankish realm.

Under Charlemagne (768-814), the Frankish realm reached its greatest territorial extent. Charlemagne's conquests led to the acquisition of the Spanish March in Catalonia, the lands of Old Saxony, north and central Lombard Italy, and as far east as modern-day Austria and Slovenia. Charlemagne exerted greater control over Bavaria, which had previously been only nominally part of the Frankish kingdom.

=== Relations between the Franks and the papacy ===
The relationship between the Franks and the papacy saw the two parties more involved in each other's affairs following the accession of Pepin III to the Frankish throne in 751. The Carolingians, who sought legitimacy to strengthen their newly acquired royal position, pursued this through religious sanction. With the assistance of Boniface, Pepin had initiated a number of reforms to the Frankish church including the correction of morals, the restoration of ecclesiastical discipline and the establishment of a church hierarchy. Boniface visited Rome three times in order to gain papal endorsement for his missionary activities east of the Rhine. Carolingian rulers also aimed to secure a good relationship with the pope to further consolidate their position. The papacy, disillusioned by its traditional alliance with the Byzantine Empire and under pressure from the Lombards, was eager to forge a new alliance with the Franks.

A new Franco-papal alliance was forged around 753 when Pope Stephen II crossed the Alps and beseeched Pepin III's aid against Lombard encroachment. Pepin obliged, apparently reluctantly, and his intervention in Italy established what is known as the Donation of Pepin which denoted lands in central Italy to be controlled by the papacy directly, as well as setting a precedent for Frankish protection of papal interests. The lands guaranteed to the embryonic Papal States via this donation would remain in papal hands for centuries to come, leaving an important legacy in Italian politics up until the twentieth century.

With the Donation of Pepin and the Frankish guarantee of papal interests established, further intervention was promised should the Lombards act against the papacy. Twenty years after Pepin's intervention in Italy, the Lombards once more threatened papal autonomy and the papacy requested Frankish assistance once more. Charlemagne, the new king of the Franks, crossed the Alps as his father Pepin had done. This time, both Charlemagne and the Pope, Adrian I, sought permanent resolution to the trouble with the Lombards. Pope Adrian's desired solution was to dismember the kingdom and place large portions of it under papal authority. Charlemagne, instead, enforced his own solution which saw the exile of the Lombard king Desiderius and the Lombard kingdom coming under his own direct control. Charlemagne thus assumed the title of "king of the Lombards".

Despite the disagreement on what would become of the Lombards, the Frankish court and the papacy continued to cooperate for mutual benefit. The Franks had become the de facto defenders of the church and of western orthodoxy. To further formalize this relationship, Pope Leo III crowned Charlemagne as Emperor of the Romans in the year 800. As emperors, the Franks could present themselves as defenders of Rome, and therefore of the papacy itself. This resulted in an official shift of allegiance of the popes from the Byzantine emperor to that of the newly crowned emperor in the West, which served to further divide the western and eastern churches. However, this new western focus ultimately helped the papacy secure greater authority for itself as a dominant power in the West, and in the ninth century, popes such as Nicholas I continued to involve themselves in Frankish politics.

=== The Carolingian reforms under Charlemagne ===
Throughout his reign, Charlemagne put himself forward as the leader of Western Christendom and demonstrated a keen interest in reforming and uniting the church. His biographer Einhard notes that Charlemagne followed the Christian religion “with great piety and devotion” and was “particularly concerned that everything done in the church should be done with the greatest dignity." Though scholars disagree on whether Charlemagne’s involvement in ecclesiastical affairs was primarily devotionally or politically motivated, it is firmly established that his impact on the Carolingian church was significant.

The Carolingian church reforms under Charlemagne included a series of measures that aimed to strengthen the moral, cultural, educational, and institutional life of the Catholic church in the Frankish empire. These reforms reflected Charlemagne’s belief that the stability of his realm depended upon the correction (correctio) of Carolingian society.

In 779 the Council of Herstal issued a capitulary indicating Charlemagne’s intentions about church reform and the cleansing of the Christian community, particularly in relation to tithing, clerical conduct, and religious instruction. The Admonitio Generalis of 789 (also known as the General Admonition) outlined Charlemagne’s program of correctio, calling for uniform doctrine and liturgy in the church, the moral reform of both the clergy and the laity, and the establishment of schools (in monasteries and cathedrals) for the Christian instruction of the children. Historian Matthew Innes notes that this program and the ensuing legislation expresses the interdependency of royal and ecclesiastical authority under Charlemagne.

The synod of Frankfurt (794) was called by Charlemagne for the purpose of discussing key religious issues, specifically in response to the unorthodox Adoptionist movement, which the synod condemned as heresy. The synod also clarified the Frankish church’s stance on icons, condemning both the veneration (iconodulism) and the destruction (iconoclasm) of icons, and permitting them to be used as educational devices. The Libri Carolini (“Charles’ Books”) produced before and completed by the synod relay the church’s theological positions.

Charlemagne continued to oversee church reforms in the late 790s, compiling capitularies on tithe enforcement, clerical celibacy, and monastic discipline. He appointed missi dominici (“royal legates”) to supervise the clergy throughout the empire, integrating royal administration with ecclesiastical governance. In 802 the Capitulare missorum generale (“General capitulary on legates”) and the Capitulare missorum specialia (“Special capitularies on legates”) reaffirmed the roles of the missi dominici over the Frankish clergy.

In 806, Charlemagne set out his succession plan with the Divisio Regnorum. His original plan was to divide his kingdom between his three sons, but by 813 only his youngest son Louis was alive. At an assembly at Aachen that year, Charlemagne urged Louis, as future king of the Franks, to continue his project of protecting and reforming the church: “Love God; govern and defend God's churches from wicked men.”

=== Kingship and empire ===
Under the Carolingians, there were considerable developments in ideas about kingship and empire, though the extent to which they were ideologically driven remains a matter of contention between historians. Francois-Louis Ganshof has argued that, under Louis the Pious especially, there was a move towards a more abstract idea of kingship that appropriated Christian ideology, to such an extent that the idea of the 'state' (res publica) reappeared for the first time since the Roman Empire.

One example of this was a greater embrace of the imperial title, which, according to Ganshof, was recognised by Louis the Pious as having given him a more universal authority. Its Christian connotations meant that it awarded Louis authority and jurisdiction over all Christian peoples, as it was his duty to protect and defend Christendom, a concept apparently borrowed from later Christian Roman emperors such as Theodosius I. Ganshof also points to the Aachen Capitulary of 802 as demonstrating a remarkably more religious tone than any of Charlemagne's prior capitularies, to such an extent that Ganshof describes Charlemagne as sermonising, attempting to reinforce his role as the secular head of the Christian community.

Further evidence of the Carolingians appropriating theological concerns in their rule is the General admonition, issued in 789, which aimed to regulate educational and religious standards, including important Christian theological teachings such as the Trinity, the Hypostatic union, and the Virgin birth of Jesus. The involvement of the Carolingians in religious matters demonstrates the idea of the Carolingian empire being above all a Christian empire, and that as Christian kings they should be involved in religious matters directly and were responsible for correct worship among and the salvation of their people.

== Structure and organisation of the church ==
=== Bishoprics ===
The basic structure of the Frankish church was constituted by ecclesiastical provinces, most of which could trace their history back to the late Roman period, having evolved from Roman dioceses. The fourth-century Notitia Galliarum, which described the provincial organisation of cities (civitates), remained an important point of reference and was widely copied in the early Middle Ages. Each province was led by a metropolitan bishop, who exercised leadership over a small number of suffragan bishops. Following the reforms of Boniface, metropolitan bishops were increasingly styled as archbishops.

The rigidity of ecclesiastical organisation uniquely provided an effective system of communication for Charlemagne's court, allowing for the correct dissemination of law and reform across the realm through the convening of regular church councils. As such, the diocesan structure promoted Carolingian unity, a vital tool in forming the identity of the empire. This is most keenly demonstrated in the extremities of Charlemagne's kingdom such as Saxony, where bishoprics consolidated royal authority through the promotion of Roman Christianity in regions newly conquered. Churches also provided the infrastructure for schooling in the Carolingian empire at local levels in monasteries as well as at the highest levels, where members of the nobility and royal family were also expected to be educated.

=== Local churches ===
Individual churches owed much to their respective communities and as such could vary in wealth, land, religious material and influence. Wealthy churches were a product of endowments by donors who could be granted privileges such as private chapels or entire churches. This meant that local, parochial churches which served the majority of the populace were often far poorer in comparison, not benefitting from such great endowments. However, local churches were a major presence across the Frankish lands: historians have estimated that there were perhaps, on average, 200 local churches in each diocese. There were more than 100 dioceses in the Carolingian regions north of the Alps, meaning that local societies were served by tens of thousands of small churches. In Italy, the ecclesiastical landscape was even more densely crowded.

=== Monasteries ===
The Merovingian period had seen an explosion of monastic foundations across the Frankish world, thanks to the influence of missionaries such as Columbanus, whose monastic lifestyles were encouraged and patronised by elites. In the Carolingian period, monasteries came to play increasingly prominent roles in society. Royal patronage of local monasteries such as Fulda and Lorsch provided a means for the court to establish relationships with local elites, thus enabling a degree of centralised control over peripheral regions. The period also saw efforts to standardize monastic practice: in the early years of Louis the Pious's reign, his chief adviser Benedict of Aniane encouraged a more uniform implementation of the Rule of St. Benedict across Frankish monasteries. Kings and aristocrats could gain social prestige through their association with the saints of prominent monasteries: for example, the Frankish kings patronised the cults of St Dionysius (Saint-Denis) in Paris and St Martin in Tours. Monasteries played a prominent role in the Carolingian economy, whereby they were endowed with earthly goods in exchange for spiritual services, thus constituting an intrinsic component of a spiritual or moral economy.

=== Canon law ===
Canon law is the body of laws which originated in early Christian society. It consisted of rulings and decrees made by church councils and of pronouncements made by popes in letters (decretals). The name ‘canon’ comes from the Greek word, κανών (kanon), meaning a ruler or measuring rod. The body of canon law was not fixed, and was organised in different collections produced to fulfil various purposes. The Dionysian collection of canons, compiled by the Roman monk Dionysius Exiguus around 500, is generally reckoned as the first attempt to organise canon law in Western Europe.

Canon law played a major role in the Carolingians reforms and reorganisation of the Frankish Church as it provided the essential authoritative texts for the promotion of ecclesiastical discipline, doctrine and conduct. The Carolingians often looked to the papacy for these authoritative texts. The Dionysio-Hadriana was given by Pope Adrian to Charlemagne and was regarded by the Franks as an authoritative collection of canon law. This collection was based on Dionysius Exiguus's sixth-century compilation, but contained numerous later additions. The Dionysio-Hadriana served as a source for ecclesiastical legislation, most notably the Admonitio Generalis (General Admonition), a major legislative text issued by Charlemagne in 789.

Other capitularies explicitly highlighted the importance of canon law by requiring priests to inculcate the laws and to act accordingly. For example, in the Capitulary of Herstal, Charlemagne ordered "that bishops are to possess authority as regards the priests and clerics within their dioceses in accordance with the canons."

== Missionaries and Christianisation ==
=== Missionary work of St Boniface ===
The history of Christianisation east of the Rhine in the late seventh and eighth centuries is intimately tied up with the rise to power of the Carolingian family. The Merovingian kings had earlier attempted to convert the many pagan Saxon tribes north of their border, however their only success came in the construction of a mission station at Utrecht, whilst Frisia and Saxony remained pagan.

The best known missionary activities of the eighth century were those of the Anglo-Saxon St. Boniface who operated in Germania from around 716 until 741, before he turned his attention to a broader reform of the Frankish church. The chronology of his efforts falls under the reign of Charles Martel during which he would be tasked by Pope Gregory II and later his successor Pope Gregory III to convert the pagans of Saxony, Frisia, Hesse, Thuringia and other major parts of Germania. Boniface's missionary activity received formal support from the papacy:

"We have taken great care to send the bearer of these letters, our revered brother and fellow-bishop Boniface, into these parts to enlighten them and to preach the word of faith, so that by his preaching he may teach them the way of eternal life[…]" -Pope Gregory II Commends Bishop Boniface to the Christians of Germany (1 December 722)

=== The Saxon Wars ===
While missionaries regularly ventured beyond Frankish borders to evangelise pagans, the Saxon Wars were a series of campaigns waged by Charlemagne to conquer Saxony and incorporate it into the Carolingian realm. Historians generally agree that the Saxon Wars had two key phases: 772 to 785, and 792 to 804. As Ingrid Rembold describes:

"[...] The Saxons were brought inside the Carolingian empire and made subject to the Carolingian king. They were incorporated into the framework of Frankish political life and military campaigning, their laws codified and augmented, their elites endowed with offices and lands (and thus presented with further opportunities for advancement and enrichment); even their economies began to grow, their villages and towns to develop [...]"

=== Christianisation of other regions ===
==== Bohemia ====
The Christianisation of Bohemia began in the ninth century and would continue after the collapse of the Carolingian Empire. Pagan nobles from outside the empire wished to co-operate with the Franks and conversion to Christianity was their form of showing loyalty and willingness to co-exist alongside the Franks. The Frankish annals generally focus on warfare against the Bohemians, but the Annals of Fulda record the visit of fourteen Bohemian leaders to the court of Louis the German in 845.

==== Scandinavia ====
Before the eighth century, Scandinavian explorers had often come into contact with the southern neighbours, primarily for trading purposes. Scandinavia was gradually Christianised between the eighth and twelfth centuries. Archbishop Ebbo of Rheims undertook missionary work in Denmark in the 820s, and a bishopric was founded at Hamburg-Bremen by the Frankish missionary Ansgar in 831. Viking raids into Francia also began around this time, however, and the conversion of Scandinavia was a slow process. Harald Bluetooth, king of Denmark, did not convert to Christianity until the 960s.

== Religion and the laity ==
=== Priests and liturgy ===
The vast majority of the inhabitants of the Carolingian Empire were Christians, and as a result priests could be found throughout the empire. In order for the priests to effectively preach to their congregations they would follow specific sets of liturgy. A clerical handbook for priests named Three Books on the Clerical Order, were written by Hrabanus Maurus in order for priests to have a guidance book on what to do. Additionally Amalarius of Metz and Walahfrid Strabo wrote important liturgical treatises and commentaries.

Bishops were required to meet with the priests of their dioceses at least twice a year, as denoted by surviving episcopal statutes (or instructions). Additionally, whilst the effectiveness of Carolingian preaching is not fully known, historians have identified an efficient system of communication throughout the empire, as religious messages were able to go from the palace to priests in local communities.

=== Schools and education ===
Within the Carolingian empire, schools and education were inherently linked to the church. Each monastery and cathedral was required to have a school. Several prominent Carolingian figures came from the church schools, perhaps the most famous example being Einhard, who was educated at Fulda. Charlemagne himself made a case for schools to teach boys, in a circular letter to the bishops and abbots of his realm, saying "those who desire to please God by living rightly should not neglect to please Him by speaking correctly."

== Theological controversies ==
=== Iconoclasm ===
Iconoclasm is the social belief in the inappropriateness of icons and other religious images or monuments, for either religious or political reasons. Individuals who engage in or support iconoclasm are called iconoclasts. The practice became common in the early eighth-century Byzantine Empire and was considered heretical by the Catholic Church. As such, iconoclasm had few adherents in the Frankish world, where church leaders maintained that images were acceptable and had significant didactic value.

In the early 790s, Charlemagne issued the Libri Carolini, a treatise composed by his courtier and adviser Theodulf of Orleans, which refuted the second council of Nicaea (787) and reaffirmed the Carolingian position which maintained that images should not be destroyed because of their usefulness in teaching but which also rejected the veneration of images made mandatory by Nicaea.

=== Adoptionism ===
Spanish Adoptionism started to appear in Carolingian territories from the eighth century, coming from the Christian held regions of Iberia, which had been largely conquered by the Umayyad Caliphate in 711. The theological argument was that Jesus Christ was the "adoptive" son of God, which put it in opposition with most other major subsects of Christianity.

One of the first attempts to eradicate Adoptionism from Frankish lands was a council at Regensburg in 792, where Adoptionism was labelled as a false doctrine. Later, at the Council of Frankfurt in 794, Adoptionism was further condemned as a heresy, and several documents were issued by scholars such as Alcuin in support of this. The adoptionist position was maintained by Elipandus, Archbishop of Toledo, and Felix, Bishop of Urgell.

== Christian art and architecture ==
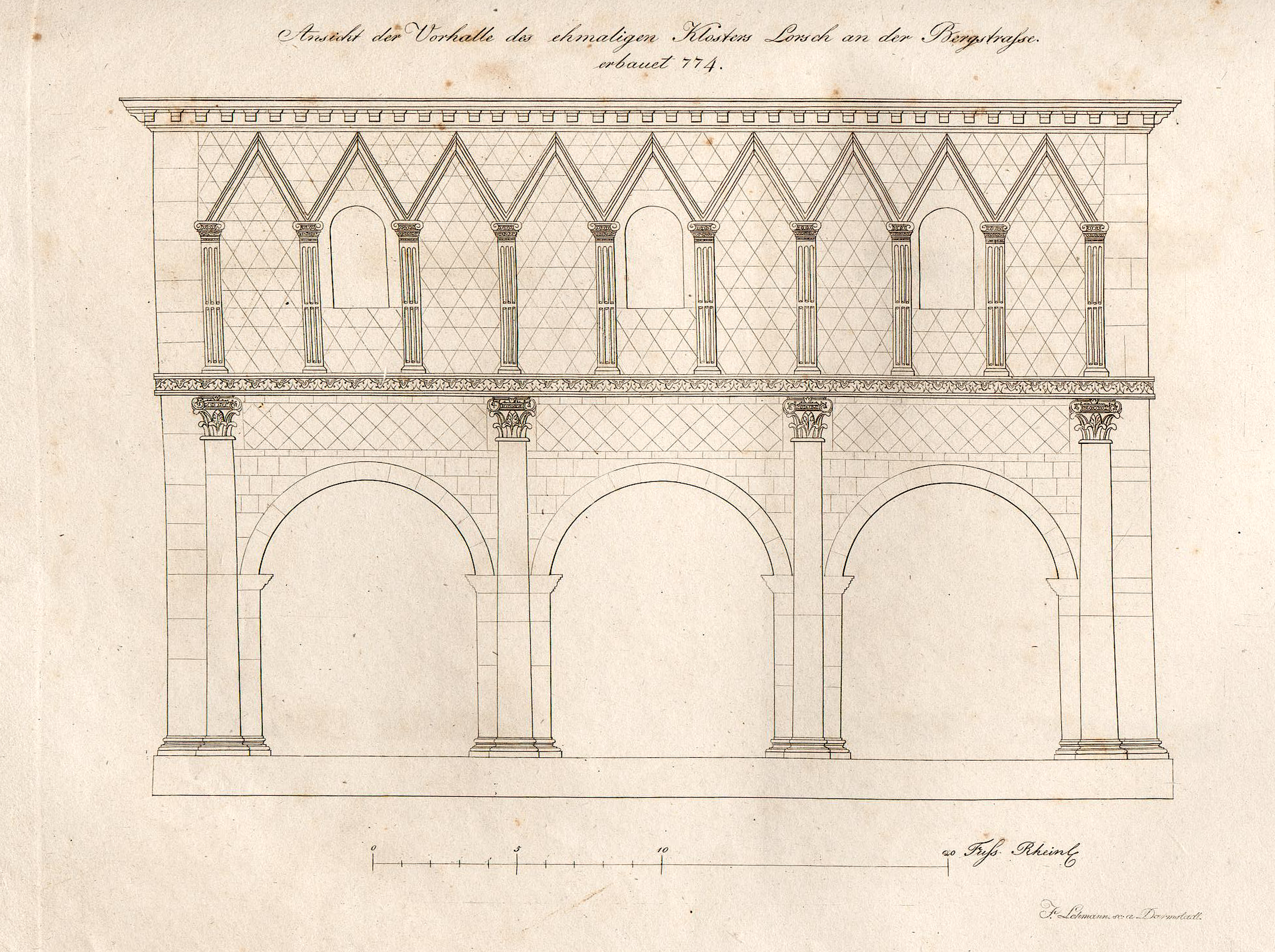
Drawings of the Lorsch monastery gatehouse emphasizing the classical influences

Lorsch gatehouse

=== Context ===
Only a small number of examples of Carolingian church architecture exist today, if plotted on a modern map these sites suggest an in depth "defensive" system of religious establishments directed towards the east.

=== Influences ===
Carolingian ecclesiastical architecture consciously attempted to draw from classical Roman architecture heavily incorporating arches, classical columns and pilasters. This is exemplified by the gatehouse of the monastery at Lorsch, constructed around 800CE. However, despite drawing heavily on early Christian and Byzantine architecture Carolingian architecture is distinctive incorporating for example; westworks, tall often west-facing entrances and Narthex. Evidence for the Byzantine influence on Carolingian ecclesiastical architecture is most clearly demonstrated by the Palatine Chapel in Aachen constructed between 792 and 805. It was likely constructed considering the 6th century octagonal Justinian church of San Vitale in Ravenna. However Aachen includes the Carolingian westwork a feature that may proceed western ecclesiastical Romanesque and Gothic architecture.

=== Westworks ===
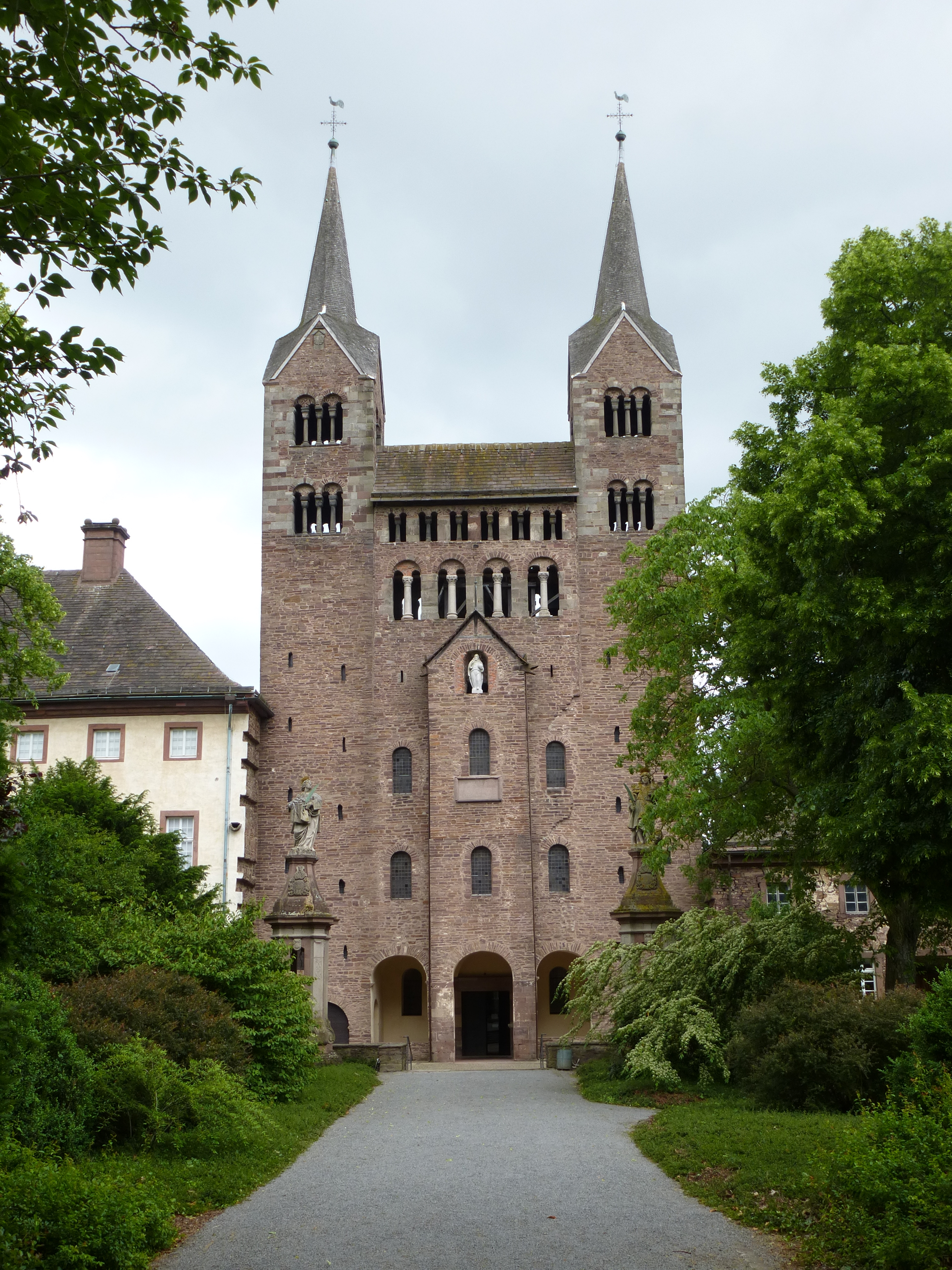
The westwork at Corvey

The only surviving Carolingian westwork is at the "Princely Abbey of Corvey" the site of which deftly exemplifies the role of the imperial monasteries within the Frankish empire in securing territorial control and administration, as well as the propagation of Christianity and Carolingian cultural and political order throughout Europe. Its location close to the border with Saxony meant that as an imperial abbey, Corvey not only had intellectual and religious functions with regard to the conversion of the problematic Saxony but was also of political and economic importance as an outpost of the Frankish Empire on the edge of the Christian world at that time. The tall and imposing westwork would have dominated the landscape and serves to demonstrate the power of the Carolingian state and its relation to religion and Carolingian cultural dominance. The Carolingian relationship with antiquary is also emphasized here with the mythological friezes presenting the only known example of wall paintings of ancient mythology with Christian interpretation in Carolingian times. It shows scenes from the Odyssey and Charlemagne and his entourage lodging in the westwork when visiting the abbey during their travels around the country.

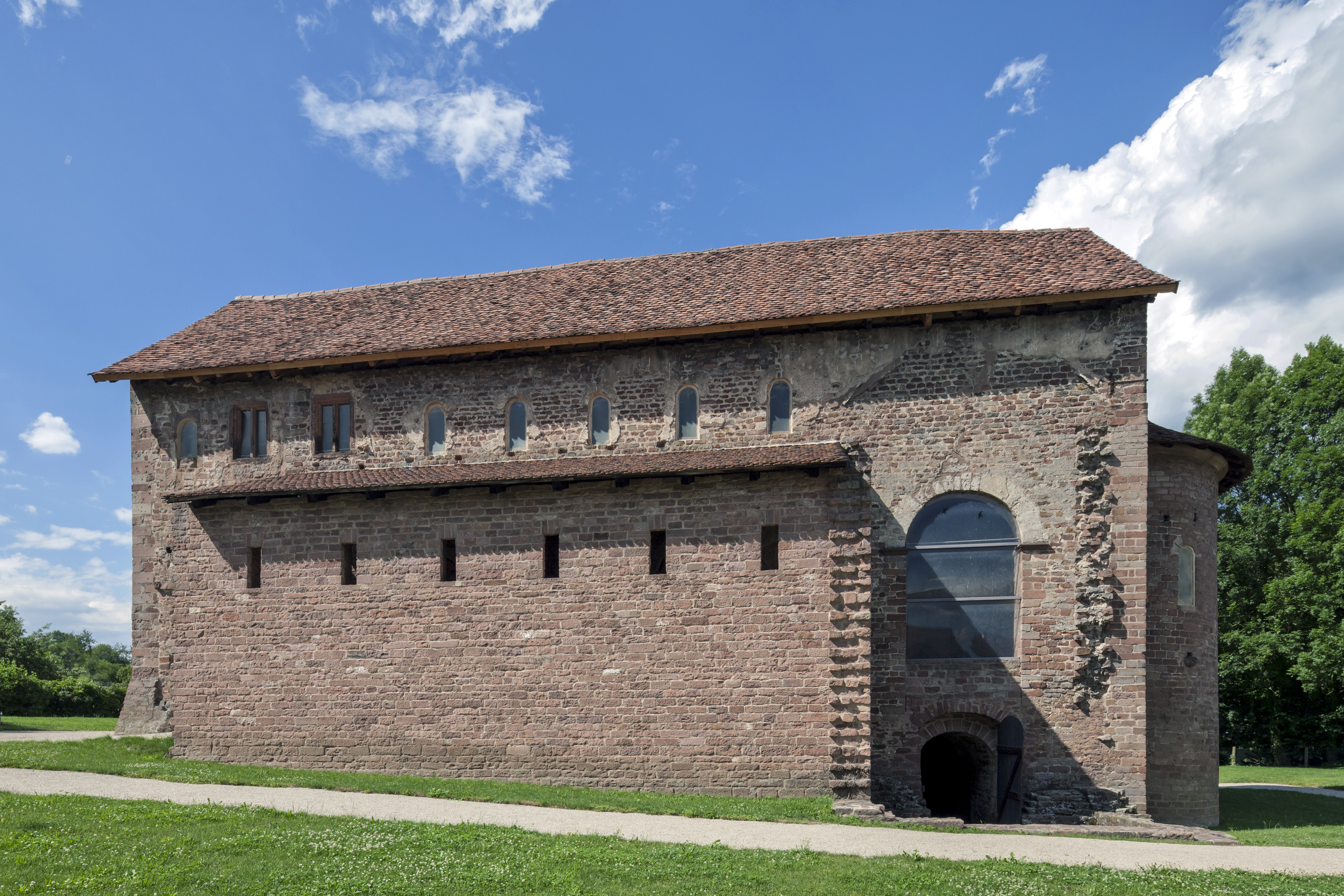
Einhard's Basilica

=== Orientation ===
The orientation of churches with the altar towards the east and the entrance from the west (a standard that had been the norm in Byzantine for a while) also begin to become the standard within the Frankish world in this period linked to religious reforms such as the adoption of the Roman liturgy.

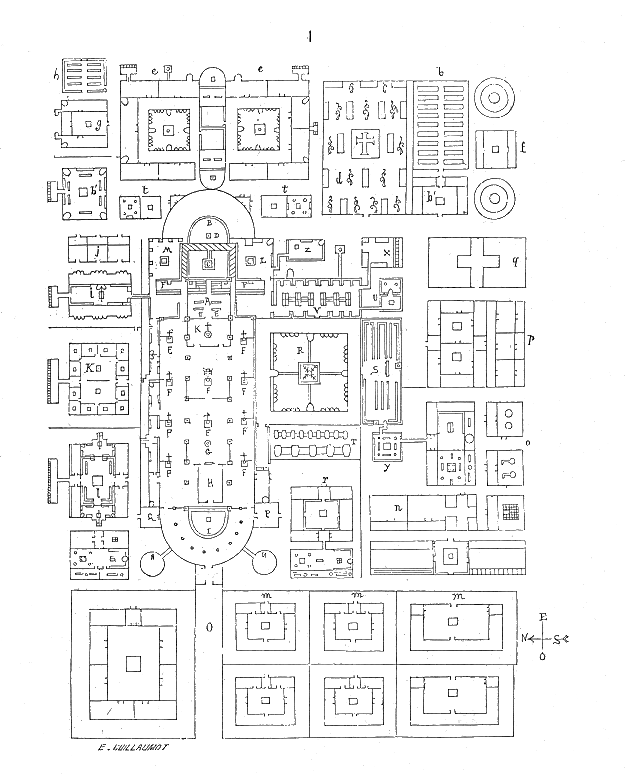
Simplified view of the plan of Saint Gall showing different structures.

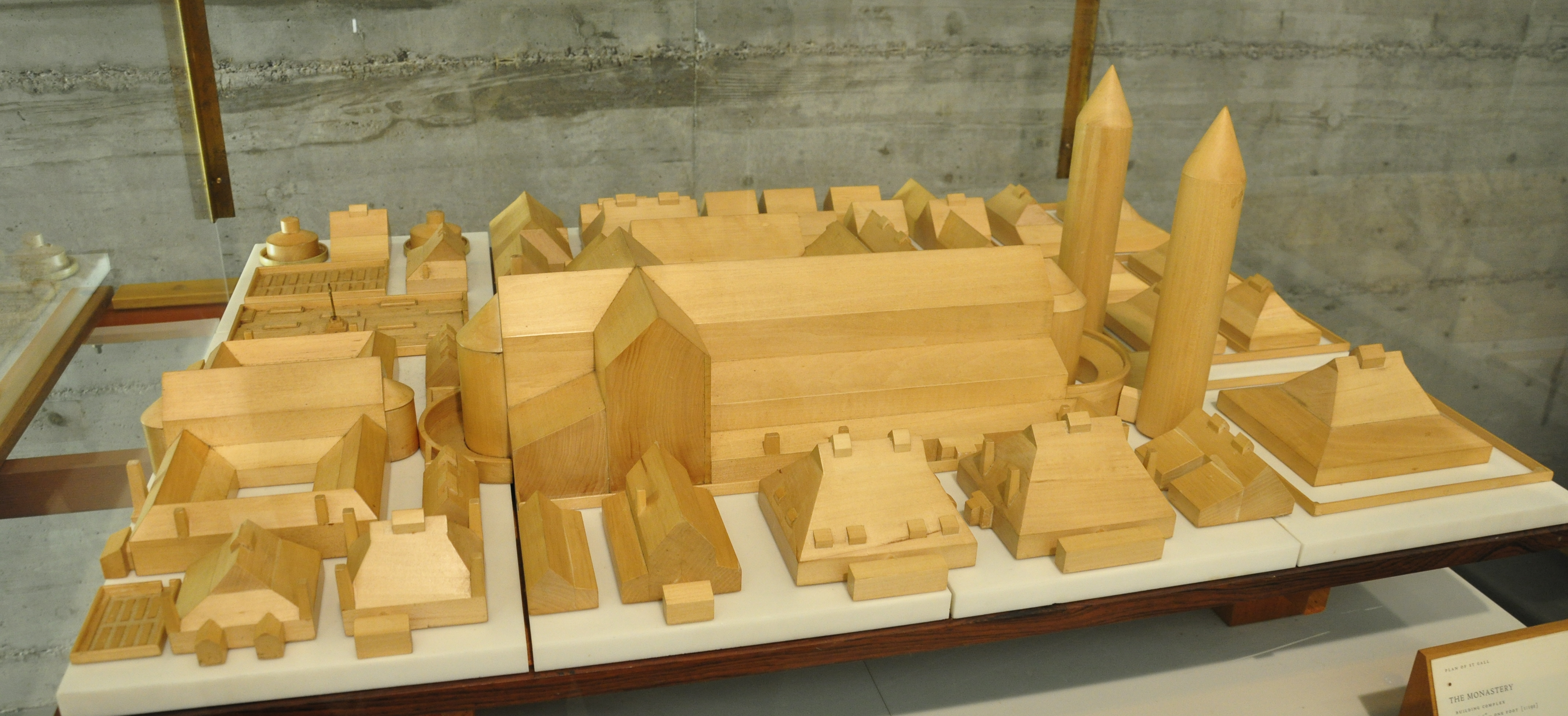
Model of the monastery of Saint Gall if it had been built to the planned specification.

Carolingian plan for a Monastic community of St. Gall

=== Plan of St. Gall ===
The plan of Saint Gall is an architectural drawing of a monastic compound created between 820–830CE. It features, churches, houses, stables, kitchens, workshops, brewery, infirmary, and a place for bloodletting. The complex was apparently meant to house about 110 monks, 115 lay visitors, and 150 craftsmen and agricultural workers. Despite never having been built it can inform historians to what the "ideal" Carolingian Benedictine monastic community might have looked like. It is possible to see the Benedictine Rule being applied in the architectural design. One of the major aspects of the rule of St Benedict is the removal from worldly life and a dedication to prayer, meditation and study. This required that the planned monastery would be self sufficient. Accordingly, the Plan features 40 ground plans which not only feature the monastic buildings (basilica, cloister, abbot's house and cemetery) but also secular buildings for the use of lay workers and visitors.

The cloister occupies the center of the Plan. It is placed in the southeast aligning itself with the sacred east and with the poor (the accommodation for pilgrims and the poor is placed in the east just beneath the cloister – away from the worldly commodities and pleasures of the secular elite).

The structure of the cloister is highly symbolic. Firstly, it is a closed space looking inwards to its own center where a savin tree is placed – sauina – illustrating the ideal of a monk's experience removed from the world. Secondly, it is foursquare and four paths lead from its covered galleries to the centre – semitae per transuersum claustri quattuor – symbolising Jerusalem and its four rivers.

The abbot's house and its position serves to illustrate their position as an intermediary between the clerical and lay worlds. The abbot's quarters are located at the other side of the abbey church from the monk's cloister, to the north-east, aligning itself with the secular elite guest houses and overlooking the infirmary and novitiate

The abbot's house faces outwards, opening to the outside world, in contrast to the monk's cloister that opens to an enclosed green space. In order to comply with the Benedictine Rule, the abbot shares his bedroom and privy with seven other monks, and his servant quarters are set apart.

The monastery basilica is cruciform and doubled-apsed to the east and to the west. It measures c.91.44 meters from apse to apse, the nave is c.12 meters in width and each aisle is c.6 meters in width.

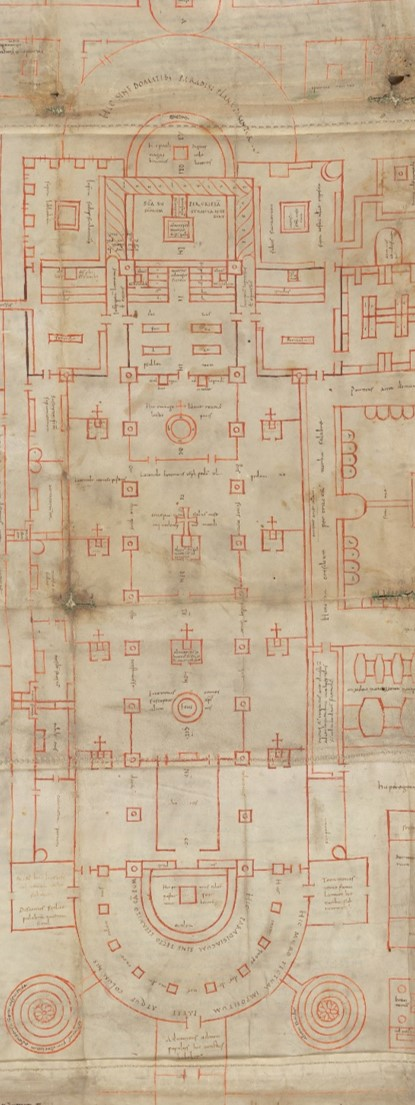
Plan of Saint Gall Basilica.

In the west entrance there are two towers dedicated to St. Michael (northern tower) and St. Gabriel (southern tower).

The entrance to the church is also the only entrance to the whole monastic complex and it is marked by a square porch inscribed: Adueniens adytum populus hic cunctus habebit (Here all the arriving crowd will find their entry). From here the visitors are directed to a semi-circular atrium where they are separated to different parts of the monastery depending on their status – the elite is directed to the north gate and the pilgrims and lower-classes to the south gate – or to the church.

The interior of the church is divided by columns and railings which not only direct the lay visitors to their authorised spaces but also block their view of the sacred east where the altar of Saint Mary and Saint Gall is placed. According to Horn and Born only one-sixth of the church is accessible to seculars while five-sixths of it is reserved for the sole use of the monks. Lay guests are only admitted in the side aisles of the church, the area around the baptismal font – fons – and the crypt – cripta; the only place in the church where monks and seculars mix to worship at the tomb of Saint Gall. The transept, the presbytery, the nave and the two apses (dedicated to Saint Peter to the west and Saint Paul to the east) being solely for the ascetics' use.

The nave opens to the aisles through nine arcades in each side, three of them "railed off" to prevent the entry of laymen. The main surface of the nave houses the baptismal font, the altar of Saint John the Baptist and Saint John the Evangelist, the altar of the Holy Saviour at the Cross and the ambo. The transept is separated from the nave by further screens and railings, in its southern arm is the altar of Saint Andrew and in its northern arm the altar of Saints Philipp and James. From the transcript the monks and lay brothers access the crypt. Finally, at the easternmost of the church is the presbytery with the high altar dedicated to Saint Mary and Saint Gall.

=== Wall paintings ===
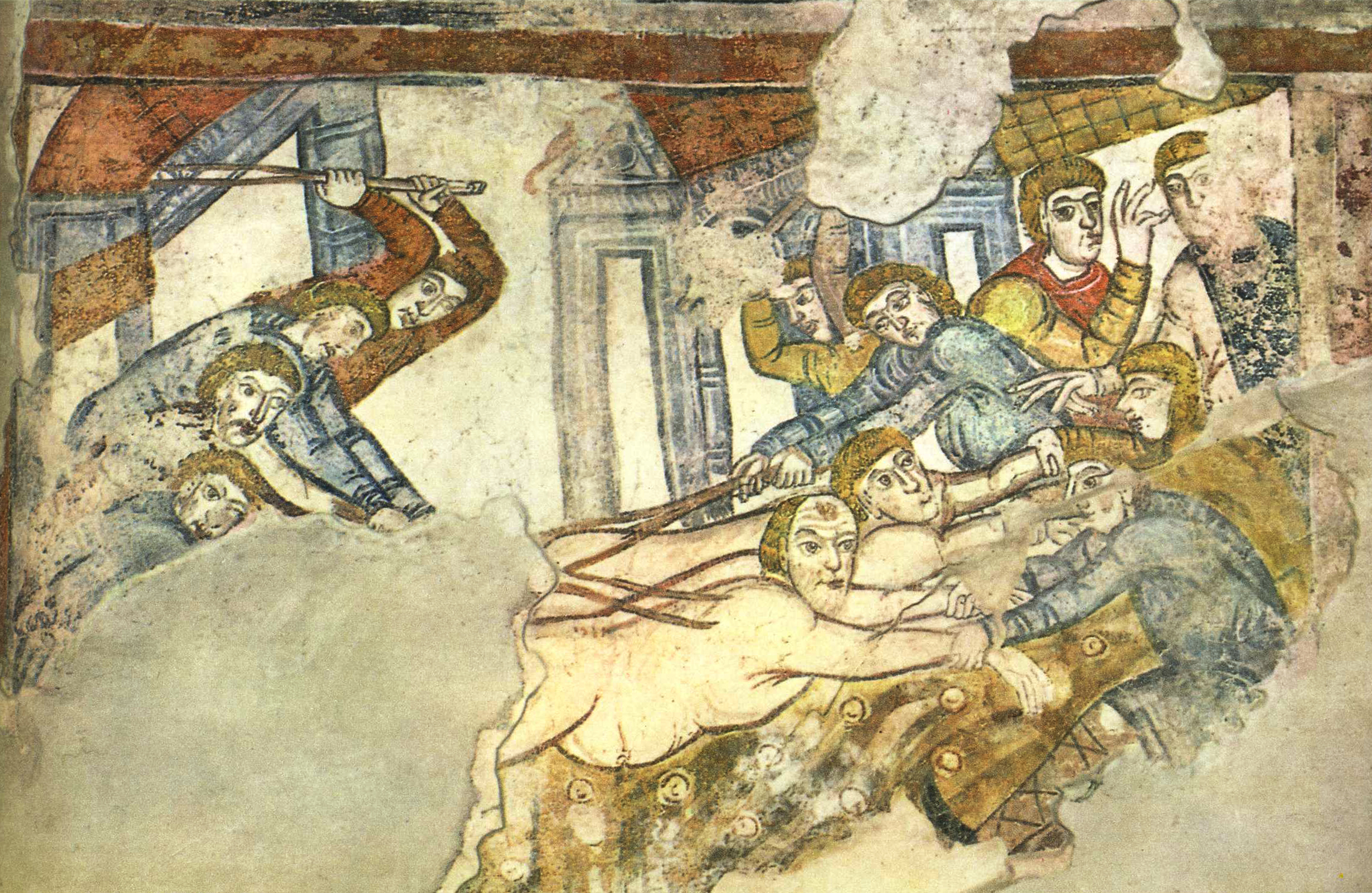
A Carolingian fresco of the Martyrdom of Saint Paul at St. Benedikt (Mals)

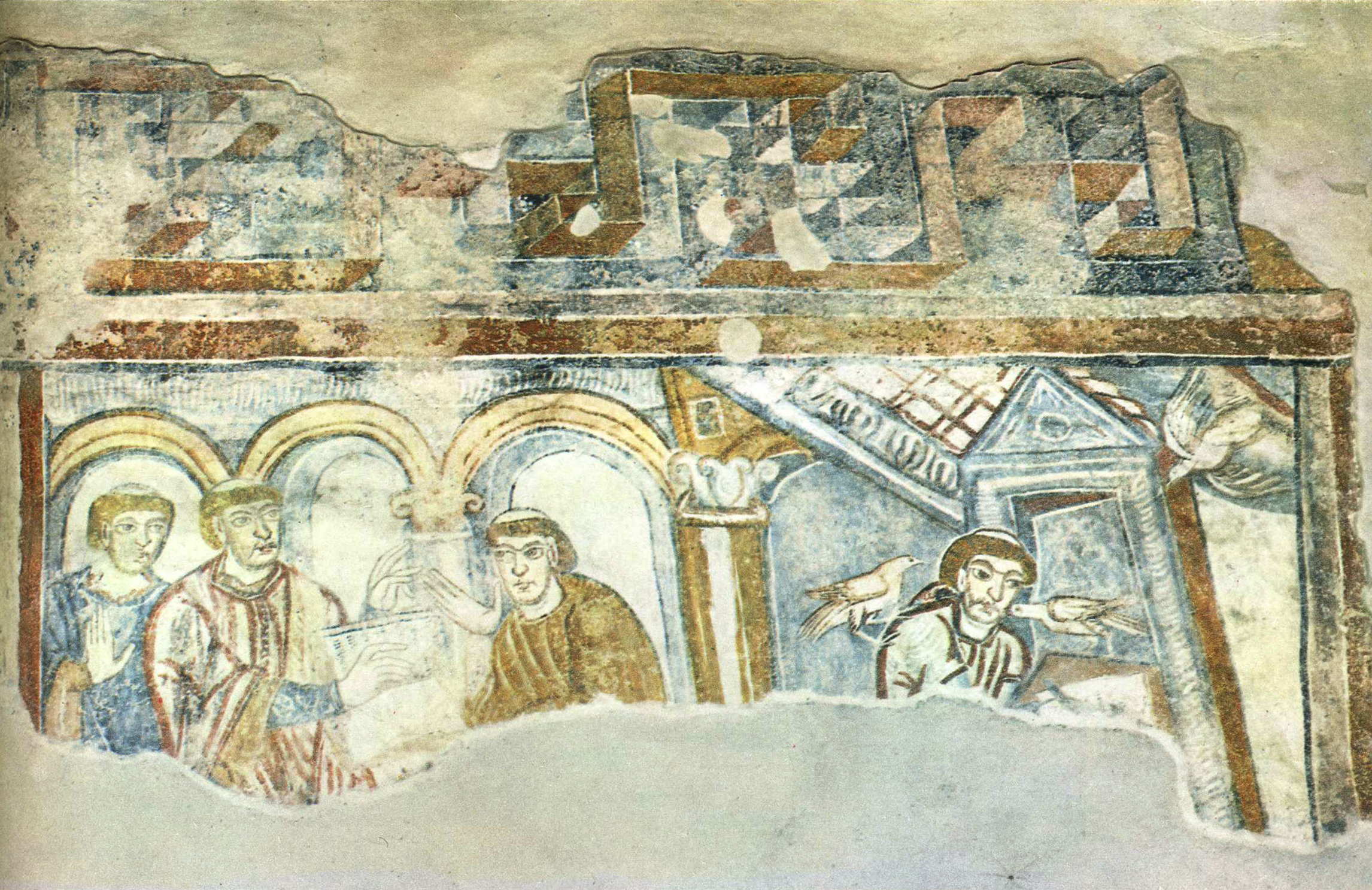
A Carolingian fresco of Saint Gregory talking to Paul the Deacon from St. Benedikt (Mals)

Many of the surviving Carolingian religious buildings (or parts of them) that have survived have survived not through any concern about preserving the past but rather through Accident, indifference or lack of funds. this must be considered when regarding the subject of wall paintings / murals. the literary records claiming to describe them are unreliable at best and the European climate is not conducive to their preservation. This combined with new construction absorbing older foundations and changing tastes leading to their removal / covering makes judgement on this subject difficult. Attempts at restoration must consider the fact that in many cases the work covering the Carolingian works have just as much artistic significance as that which it covers. The clearest examples of Carolingian wall art are found in remote parish churches where the art was overlooked or whitewashed such as in the Swiss canton of Graubünden, the convent church of St. Johann at Müstair and east of the Ofen-Pass and south of the Reschen-Pass following the road into the valley of the Adige in the South Tirol, in northern Italy, in the small chapal of St. Benedikt at Mals and of St. Prokulud at Naturns. (see Hubert et al., Carolingian Art, pp19ff for further detail). The frescos at St. Benedikt at Mals are dated to c. AD 800. The frescoes are mostly distributed in three niches in the altar wall, showing Jesus in the center, flanked by pope Gregory the Great and Saint Stephen. On the walls separating the niches are donor portraits below a troop of twelve angels, and scenes showing Gregory writing his Dialogi and disputing with Paulus Diaconus, coupled with scenes showing Paul of Tarsus and a fragment of a scene from the life of Saint Benedict.

St. Johann at Müstair was originally a Benedictine monastic foundation reputedly founded by Charlemagne himself 780/790CE. it was converted to a convent ion 1087CE after a fire in 1079CE. As a part of the imperial domain it may be assumed that the art on display would be Representative of the "official" Carolingian style. The murals date from the 9th century. the art features forty nine framed areas on the walls and two large depictions of the last judgement (supposedly the earliest treatment of the subject in western art) and Christs ascension are still visible. The walls to the North, South and West are decorated with Davidic themes connected to a theme in Carolingian art of Charlemagne that saw in David a prefiguration of Charlemagne. Interestingly on the South wall a two-paneled crucifixion scene has been preserved, but only a few other pannals have also. The crucified Christ is flanked above the arms by a destroyed Sun God/Apollo/Sol and a preserved Moon Goddess/Selena/Luna and at the sides by Ecclesia and Synagoga. This composition appears in other genres of the Carolingian period.

It has been suggested by Herbert Schutz that as these places situated along the path through the Alpine passes would attract pilgrims and itinerant painters. Despite this regional proximity however (as well as their being contemporary) there exists stylistic differences in sophistication, composition and dramatization of events between the sites as western Carolingian monastic, Lomardic, Byzantine and even Syrian influences can be identified.

There is no concrete link between the painting of murals and the illumination of books. Libraries and scriptoria did not necessarily stimulate wall paintings.
