= St. Benedikt (Mals) =

Church in South Tyrol, Italy

Coordinates: 46.6903°N 10.5395°E

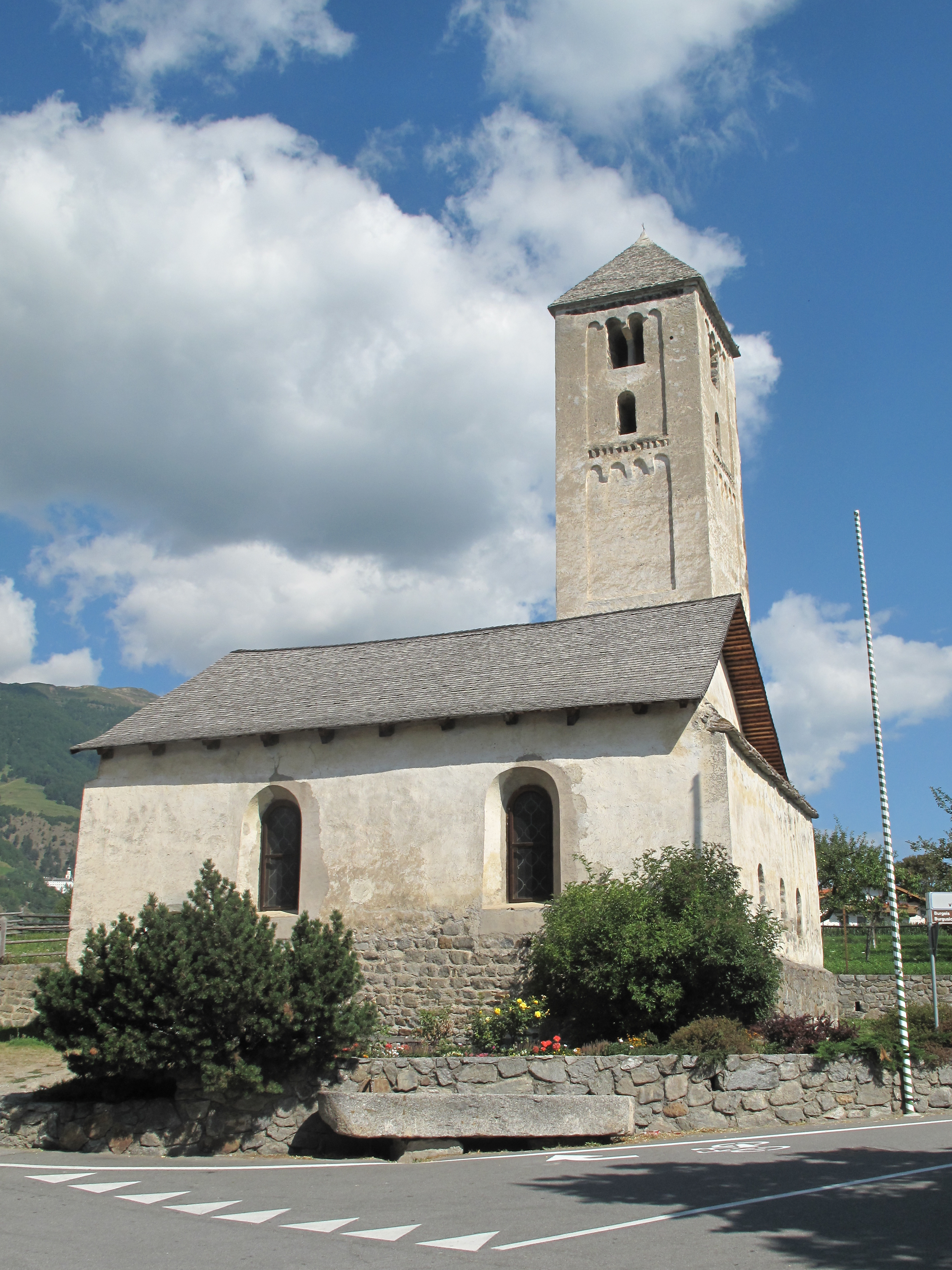
St. Benedikt, in Mals

St. Benedikt is a pre-Romanesque church in Mals, South Tyrol, known for its Carolingian-era frescoes.

It was built in the second half of the 8th century. Until the 12th century, it was owned by the bishops of Chur. In the 12th century, the romanesque tower was added.

In the 18th century, under Joseph II, the building was used for storage. Use as a sacral building was resumed only in the 20th century, after the discovery of the Carolingian frescoes.

The frescoes are dated to c. AD 800. They belong to a limited set of surviving frescoes of the Carolingian period, alongside those of the nearby St. Johann abbey in Val Müstair, Grisons. The frescoes are mostly distributed in three niches in the altar wall, showing Jesus Christ in the center, flanked by pope Gregory the Great and Saint Stephen. On the walls separating the niches are donor portraits below a troop of twelve angels, and scenes showing Gregory writing his Dialogi and disputing with Paulus Diaconus, alongsides scenes showing Paul of Tarsus and a fragment of a scene from the life of Saint Benedict.

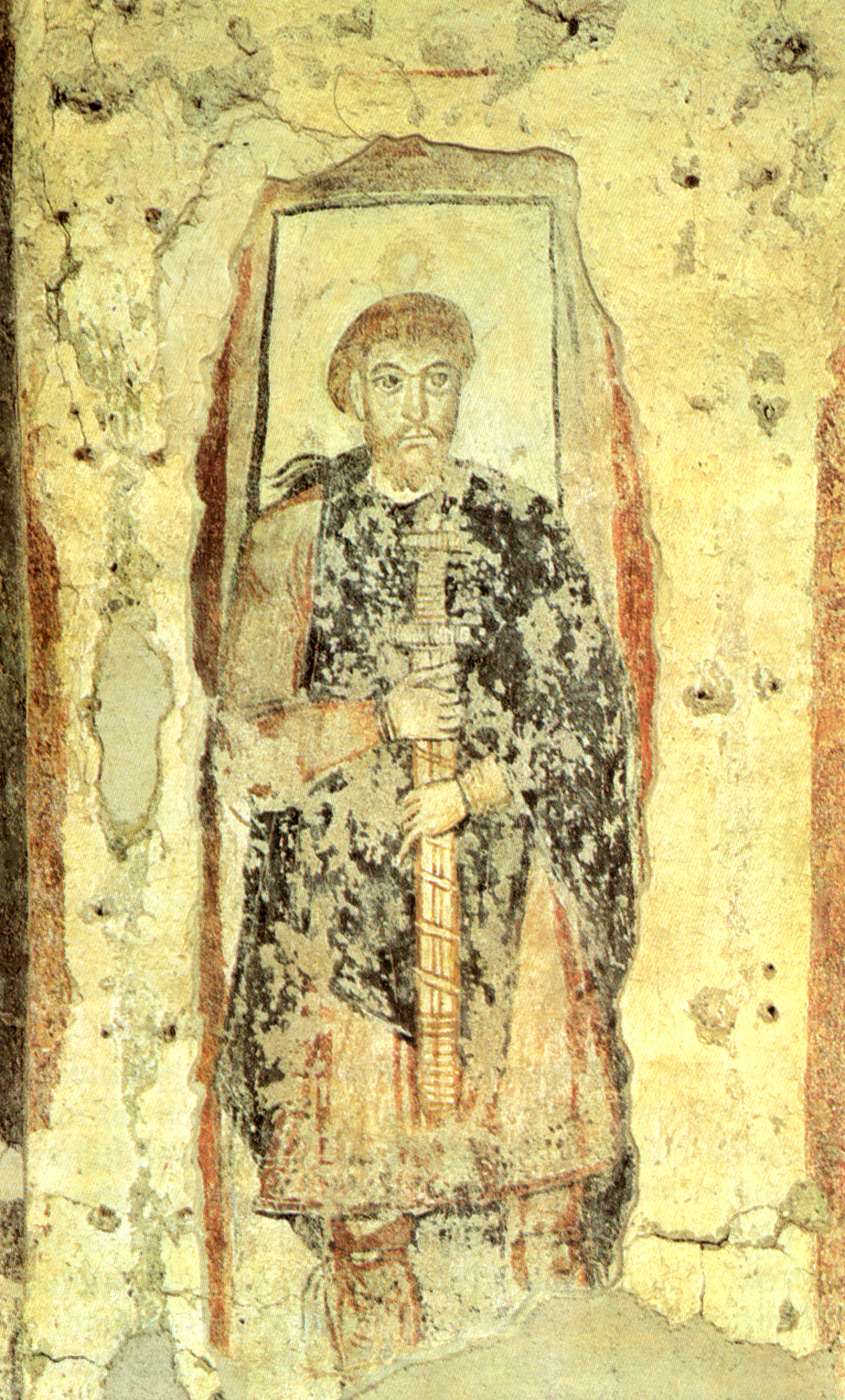
Donor portrait

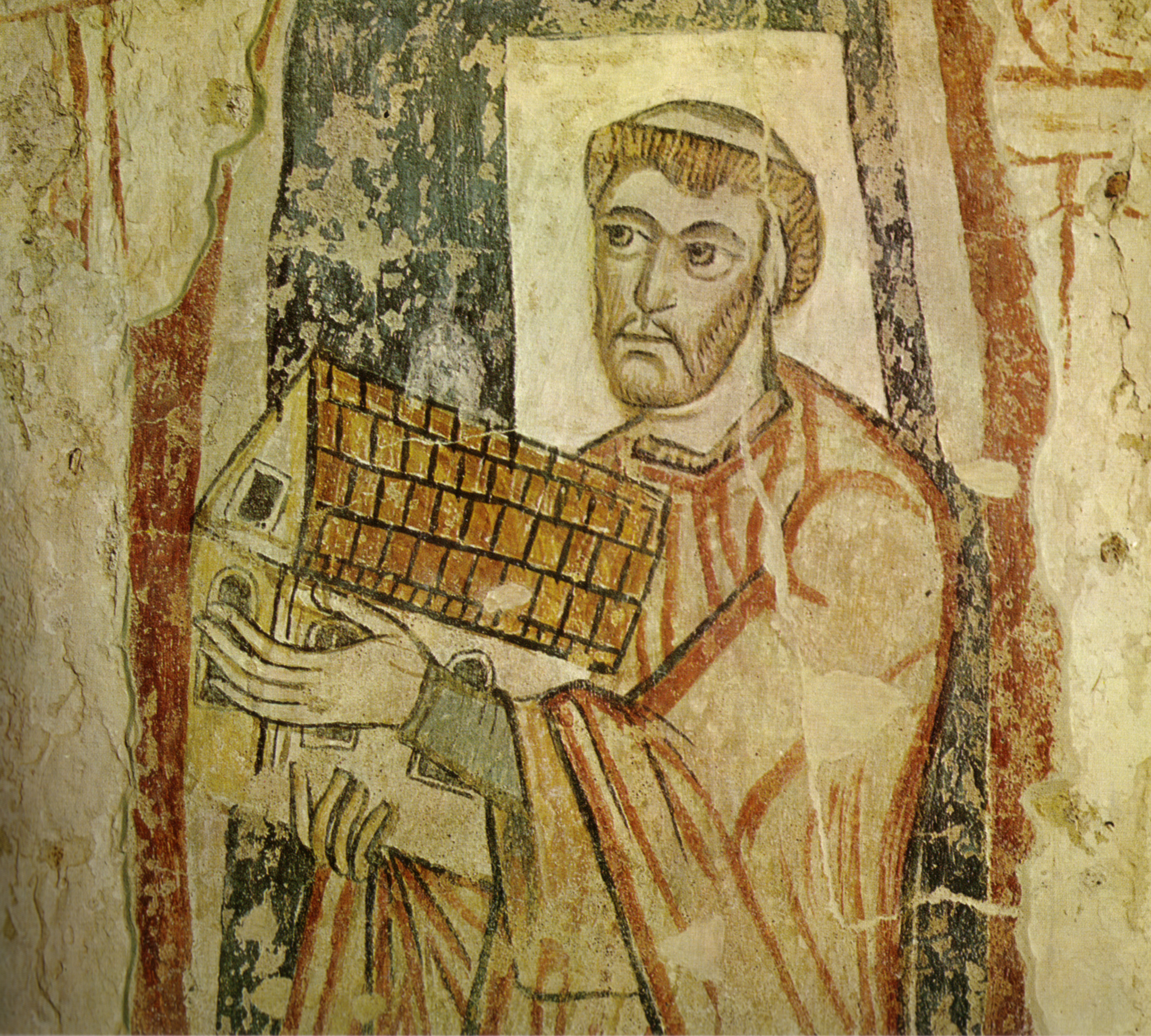
Donor portrait

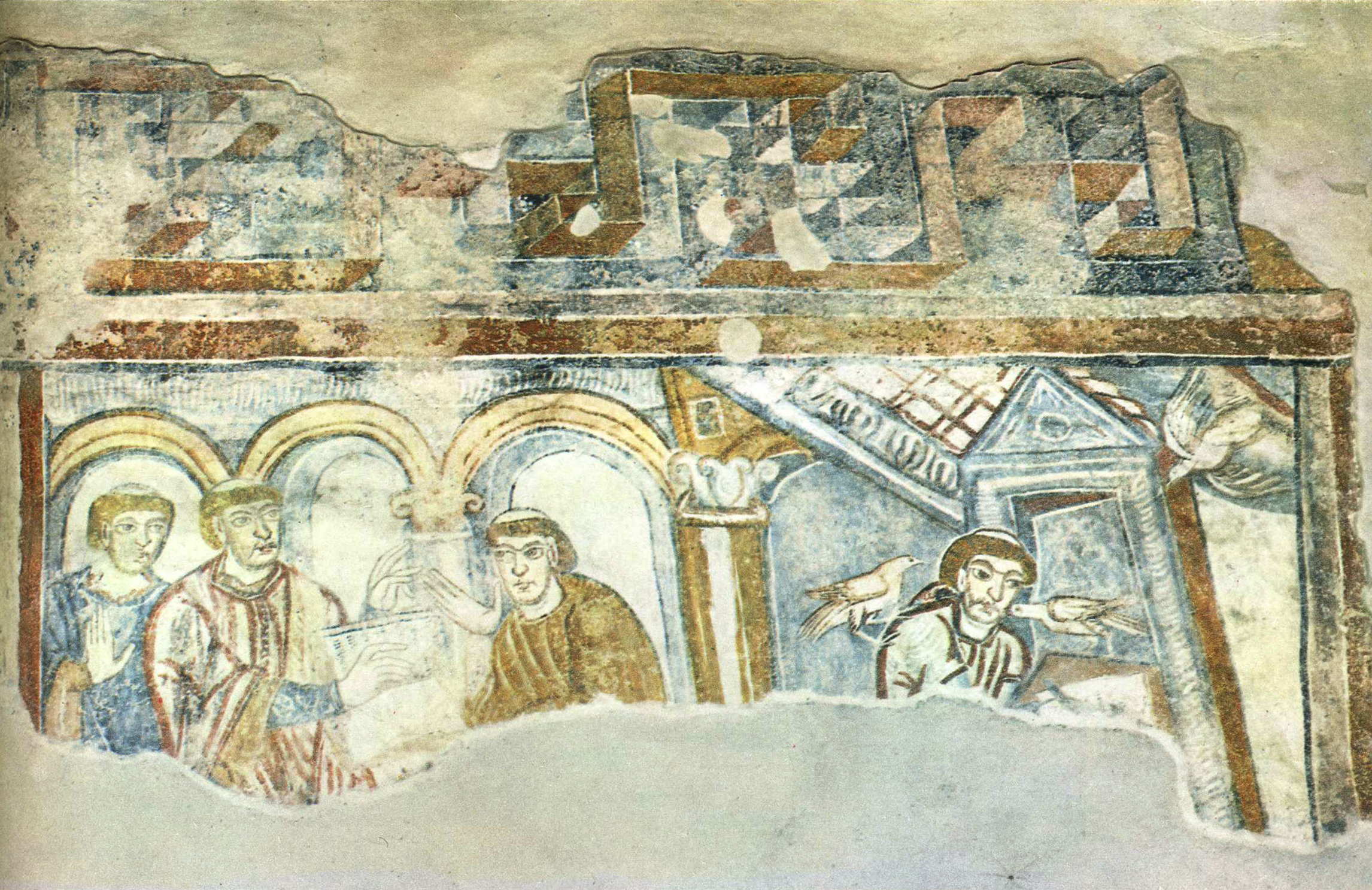
Saint Gregory talking to Paul the Deacon

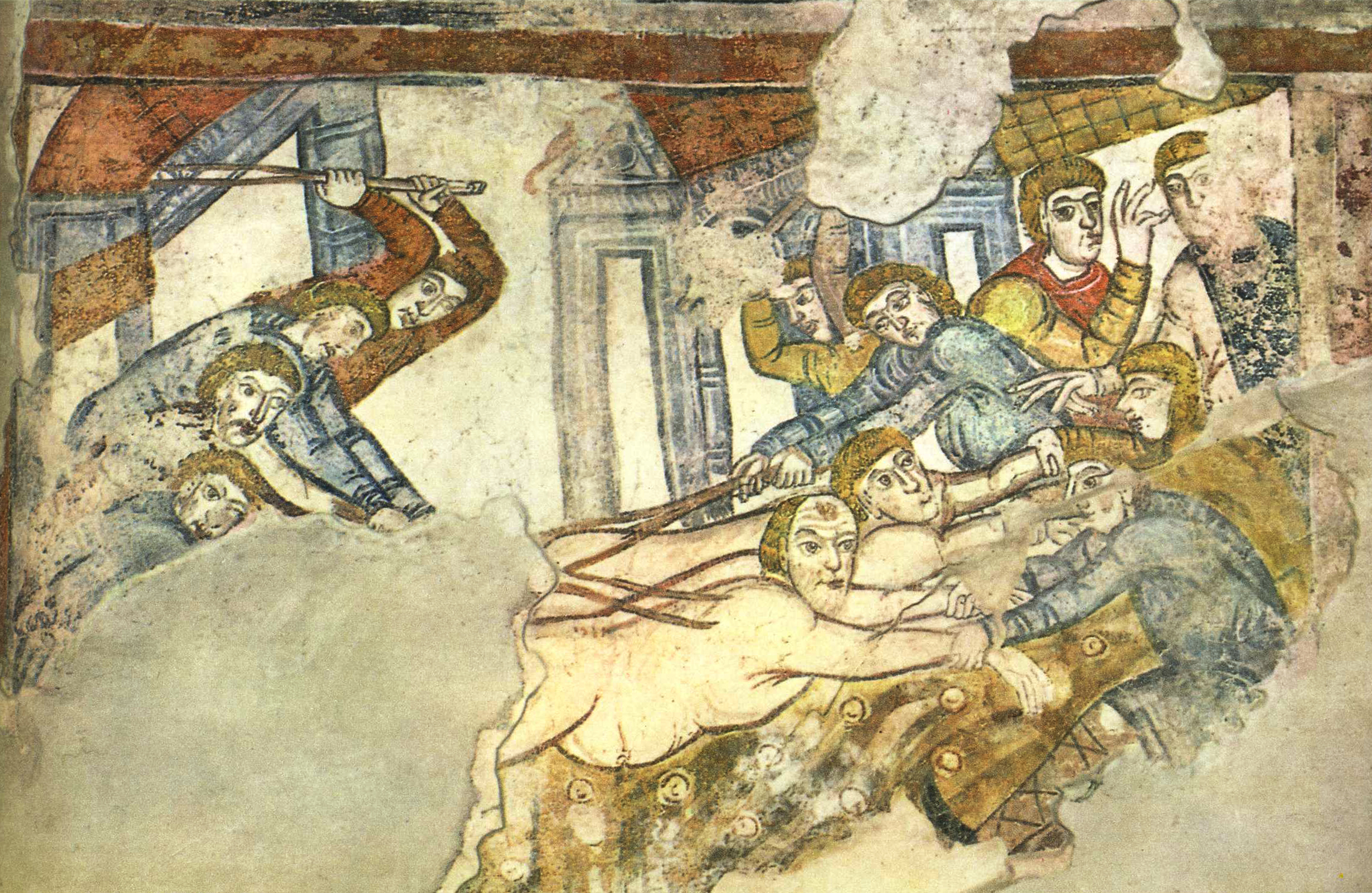
Martyrdom of Saint Paul

== Literature ==
- Oskar Emmenegger, Helmut Stampfer: "Die Wandmalereien von St. Benedikt in Mals im Lichte einer maltechnischen Untersuchung" in: Die Kunst und ihre Erhaltung, Worms 1990, 247–268
- Mathias Frei: St. Benedikt in Mals (= SB-Farbkunstführer Südtirol; 3). SB-Verlag, Bozen 1995.
- Hans Nothdurfter: St. Benedikt in Mals. Tappeiner, Lana 2002.
- Elisabeth Rüber: St. Benedikt in Mals (= Europäische Hochschulschriften, Reihe 28, Kunstgeschichte; 130). Lang, Frankfurt am Main 1991.
- Elisabeth Rüber: Sankt Benedikt in Mals. Atheisa, Bozen 1992.
