= List of railway stations in County Durham =

This is a list of National Rail stations in the ceremonial county of Durham by 2017/2018 entries and exits, based on the UK Office of Rail and Road reports 2016-18. Note that Horden station opened in 2020 so received no entries and exits in this period.

== List ==
Rank	Station	Area served	Unitary authority	Operator	Line(s)	Platforms	Passenger usage 2016/17	Passenger usage 2017/18	Image
1	Durham	Durham	County Durham	London North Eastern Railway	East Coast Main Line	2	2,623,676	2,747,748	
2	Darlington	Darlington	Darlington	London North Eastern Railway	East Coast Main Line and Tees Valley Line	4	2,269,974	2,324,906	
3	Hartlepool	Hartlepool	Hartlepool	Northern	Durham Coast Line	2	638,058	638,050	
4	Chester-le-Street	Chester-le-Street	County Durham	Northern	East Coast Main Line	2	230,972	219,592	
5	Eaglescliffe	Eaglescliffe	Stockton-on-Tees	Northern	Tees Valley Line and Northallerton–Eaglescliffe Line	2	206,848	207,186	
6	Seaham	Seaham	County Durham	Northern	Durham Coast Line	2	145,362	140,894	
7	Bishop Auckland	Bishop Auckland	County Durham	Northern	Tees Valley Line	1	118,742	123,144	
8	Billingham	Billingham	Stockton-on-Tees	Northern	Durham Coast Line	2	94,994	81,862	
9	Stockton	Stockton-on-Tees	Stockton-on-Tees	Northern	Durham Coast Line	2	80,624	79,260	
10	Allens West	Eaglescliffe	Stockton-on-Tees	Northern	Tees Valley Line	2	65,414	64,792	
11	Newton Aycliffe	Newton Aycliffe	County Durham	Northern	Tees Valley Line	2	61,944	62,882	
12	Seaton Carew	Seaton Carew	Hartlepool	Northern	Durham Coast Line	2	57,160	61,858	
13	Dinsdale	Middleton St George	Darlington	Northern	Tees Valley Line	2	59,110	56,850	
14	Shildon	Shildon	County Durham	Northern	Tees Valley Line	2	51,994	48,840	
15	North Road	Northern Darlington	Darlington	Northern	Tees Valley Line	1	33,350	30,306	
16	Heighington	Aycliffe Business Park	County Durham	Northern	Tees Valley Line	2	18,958	15,878	
17	Teesside Airport	Teesside International Airport	Darlington	Northern	Tees Valley Line	1 (+1 out of use)	30	74	
-	Horden	Horden	County Durham	Northern	Durham Coast Line	2	N/A	N/A	

== See also ==
- Station usage in County Durham
- List of United Kingdom railway stations
