= Station usage in County Durham =

This is a list of railway stations in County Durham, with estimated usage figures gathered from data collected by the Office of Rail and Road (ORR). As of July 2020, there are 17 stations located within County Durham, from which around 6.47 million passenger journeys were made during 2018–19. Note that Horden station opened in 2020 so received no entries and exits in the period covered by the data from 2015-2019. Teesside Airport was mothballed in May 2022.

Railway station usage in County Durham
Station	Usage ranking	Operated by	Constituency	Journey(s) 2025-26	Journey(s) 2024-25	Journey(s) 2018–19	Journey(s) 2017–18	Journey(s) 2016–17	Journey(s) 2015–16
Darlington	1	LNER	Darlington	3,220,552	2,827,176	2,394,446	2,324,846	2,269,974	2,244,498
Durham	2	LNER	City of Durham	3,024,514	2,809,984	2,822,860	2,747,692	2,623,676	2,595,016
Chester-le-Street	3	Northern Trains	North Durham	293,902	232,324	199,260	219,592	230,972	223,326
Eaglescliffe	4	Northern Trains	Stockton West	249,872	211,956	202,222	207,186	206,848	202,156
Bishop Auckland	5	Northern Trains	Bishop Auckland	189,790	169,032	155,378	123,144	118,742	110,060
Seaham	6	Northern Trains	Easington	182,216	164,994	137,652	140,894	145,362	137,948
Horden	7	Northern Trains	Easington	175,860	164,582	-	-	-	-
Billingham	8	Northern Trains	Stockton North	134,592	118,110	78,004	81,862	94,994	86,016
Stockton	9	Northern Trains	Stockton North	130,172	120,000	83,050	79,260	80,624	76,940
Seaton Carew	10	Northern Trains	Hartlepool	111,268	98,362	65,478	61,858	57,160	55,974
Allens West	11	Northern Trains	Stockton West	107,160	99,646	65,136	64,792	65,414	63,190
Dinsdale	12	Northern Trains	Stockton West	105,152	88,380	59,608	56,850	59,110	54,618
Newton Aycliffe	13	Northern Trains	Newton Aycliffe and Spennymoor	87,214	78,114	78,962	62,882	61,944	60,548
Shildon	14	Northern Trains	Bishop Auckland	67,824	60,288	67,568	48,838	51,994	45,816
North Road	15	Northern Trains	Darlington	65,882	51,248	39,968	30,306	33,350	32,300
Heighington	16	Northern Trains	Newton Aycliffe and Spennymoor	40,558	37,274	22,726	15,878	18,958	18,286
Teesside Airport	17	Northern Trains	Stockton West	-	-	206	74	30	98

== Gallery ==
Railway stations in County Durham
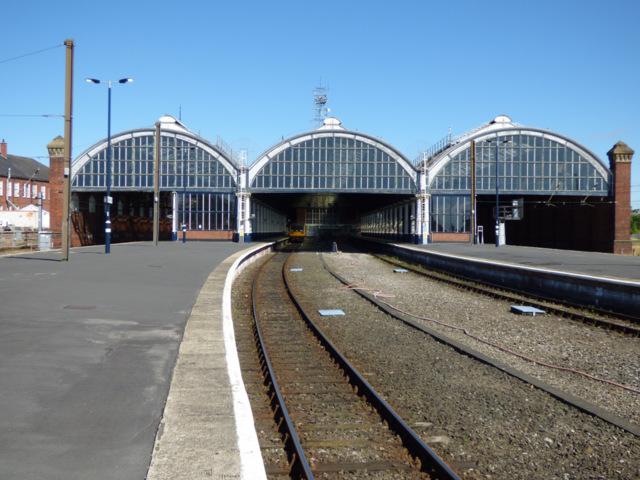
Darlington is the most used station in County Durham

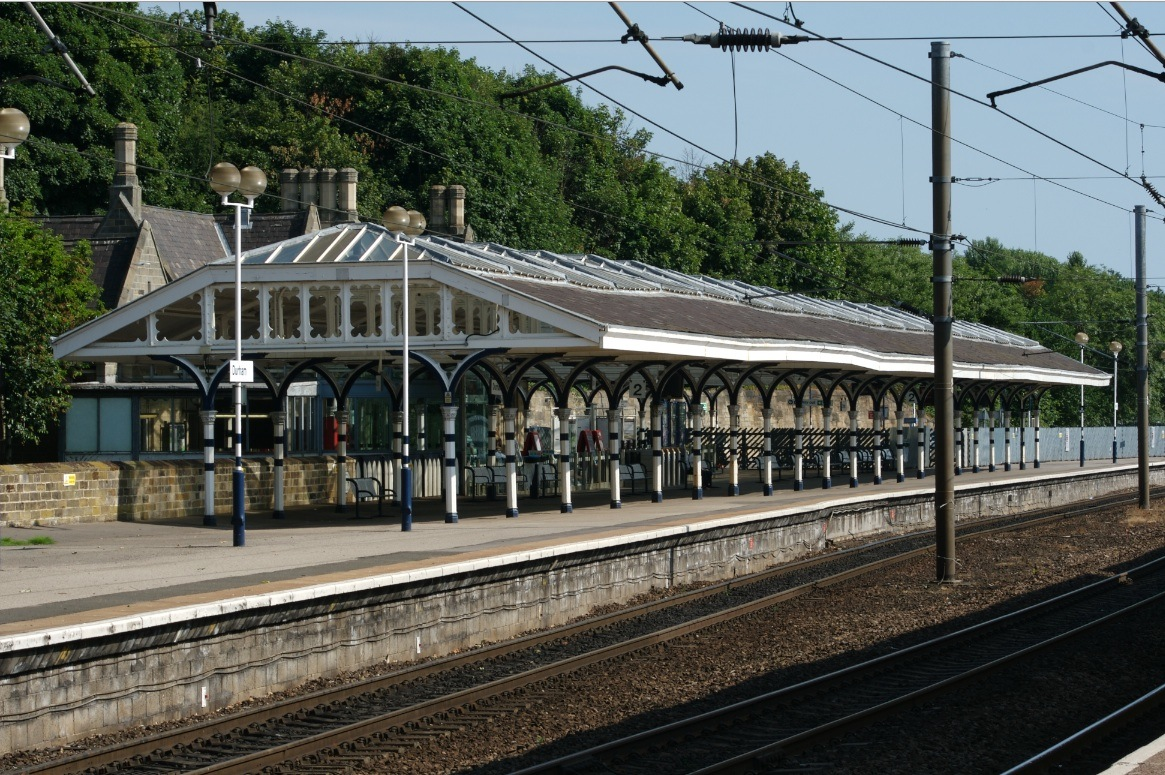
Durham is the second most used station

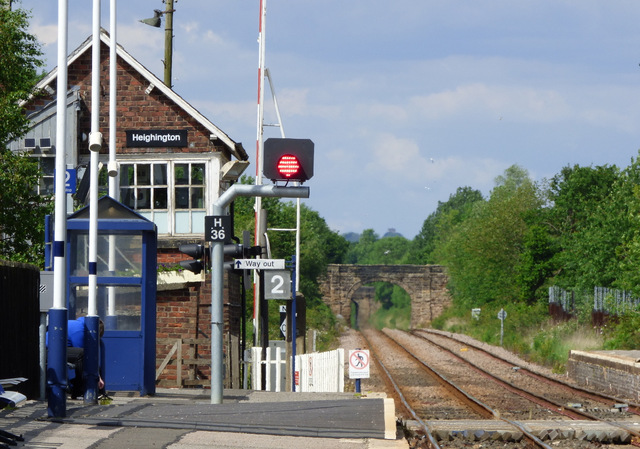
Heighington is the least used station in County Durham with regular passenger services

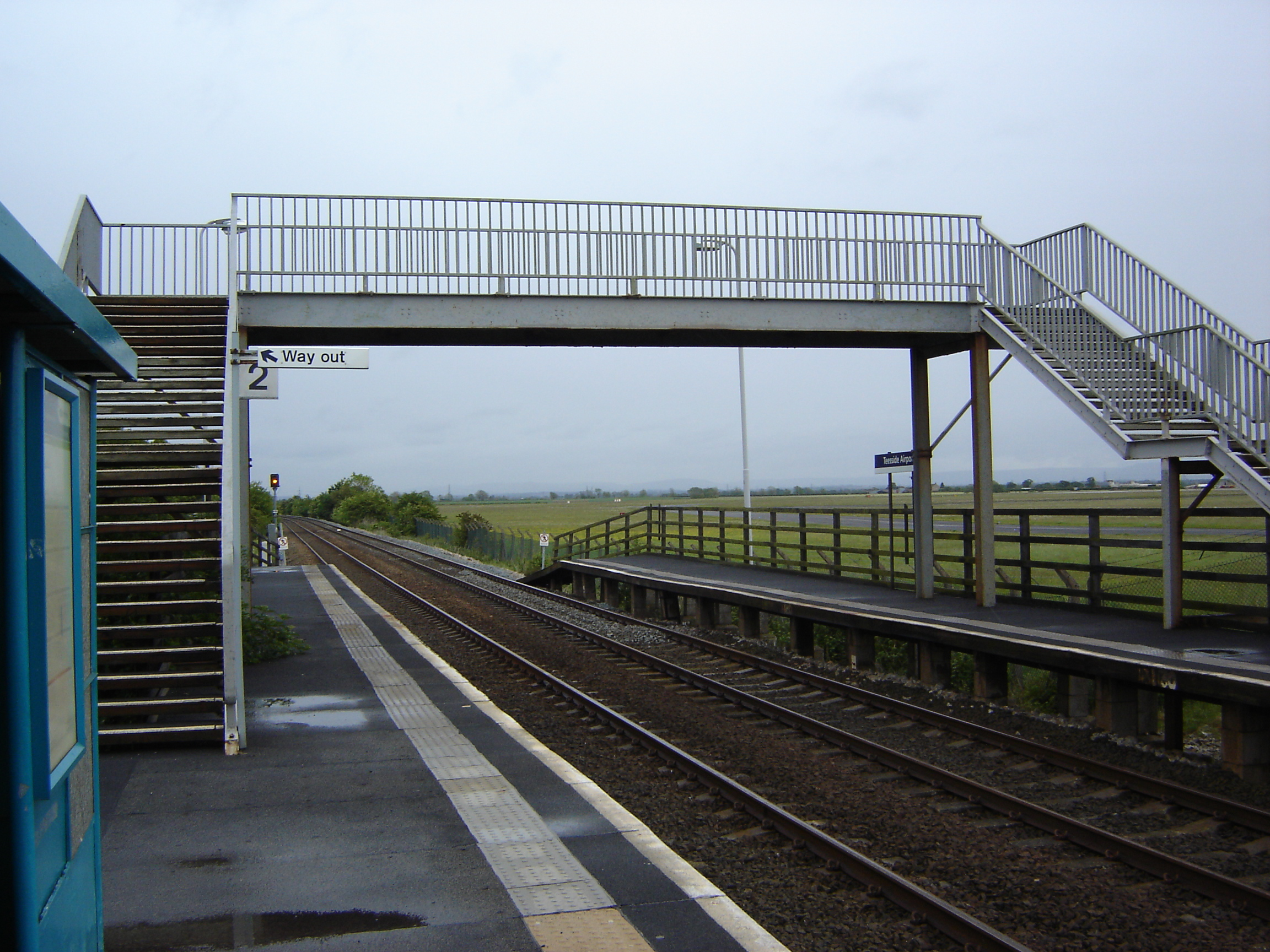
Teesside Airport is currently the least-used station in County Durham, but no trains have called there since 2022

== See also ==
- List of railway stations in County Durham
- List of busiest railway stations in Great Britain
