= Tees Valley =

Strategic authority area in England

- Strategic authority area
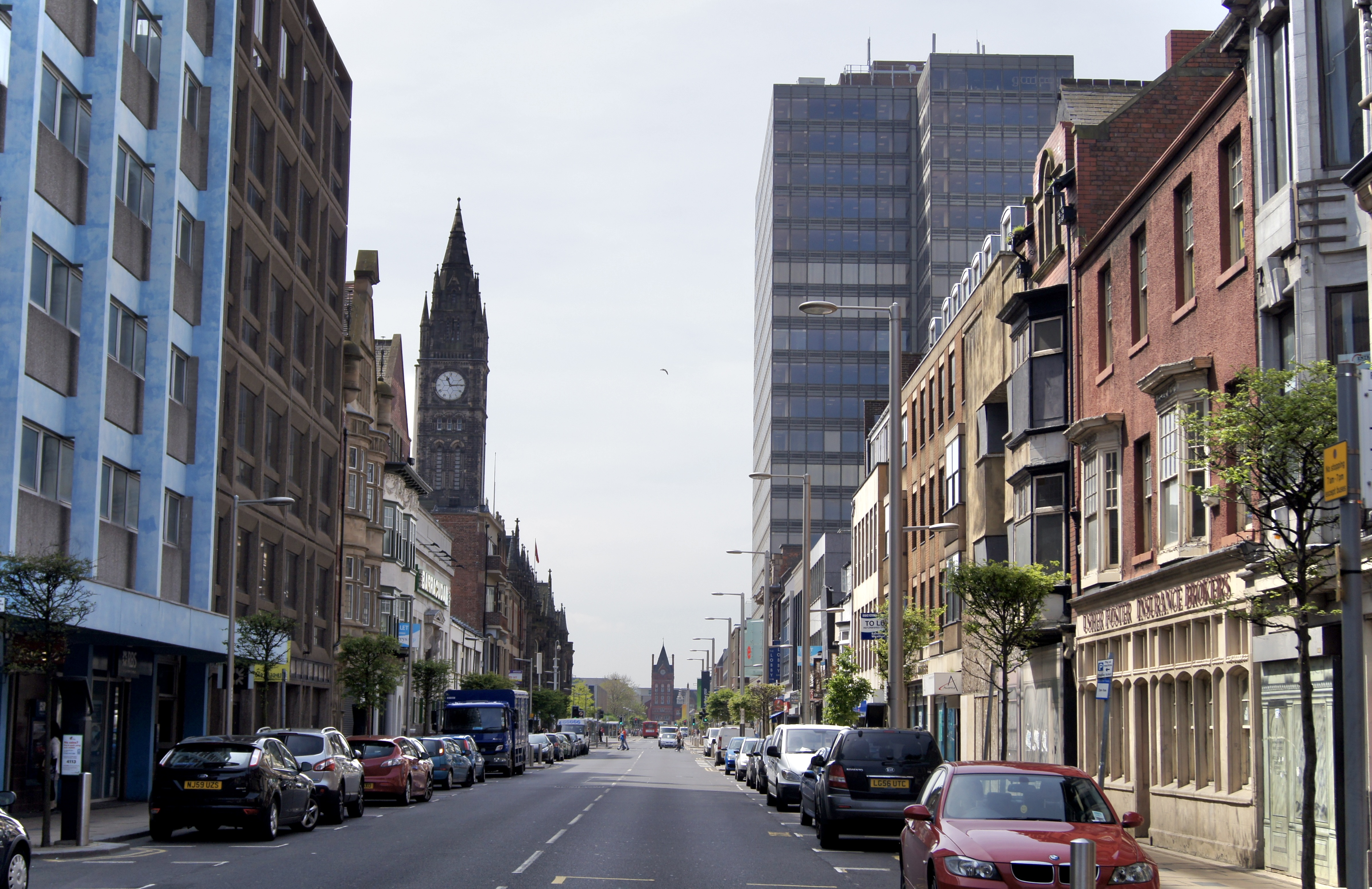
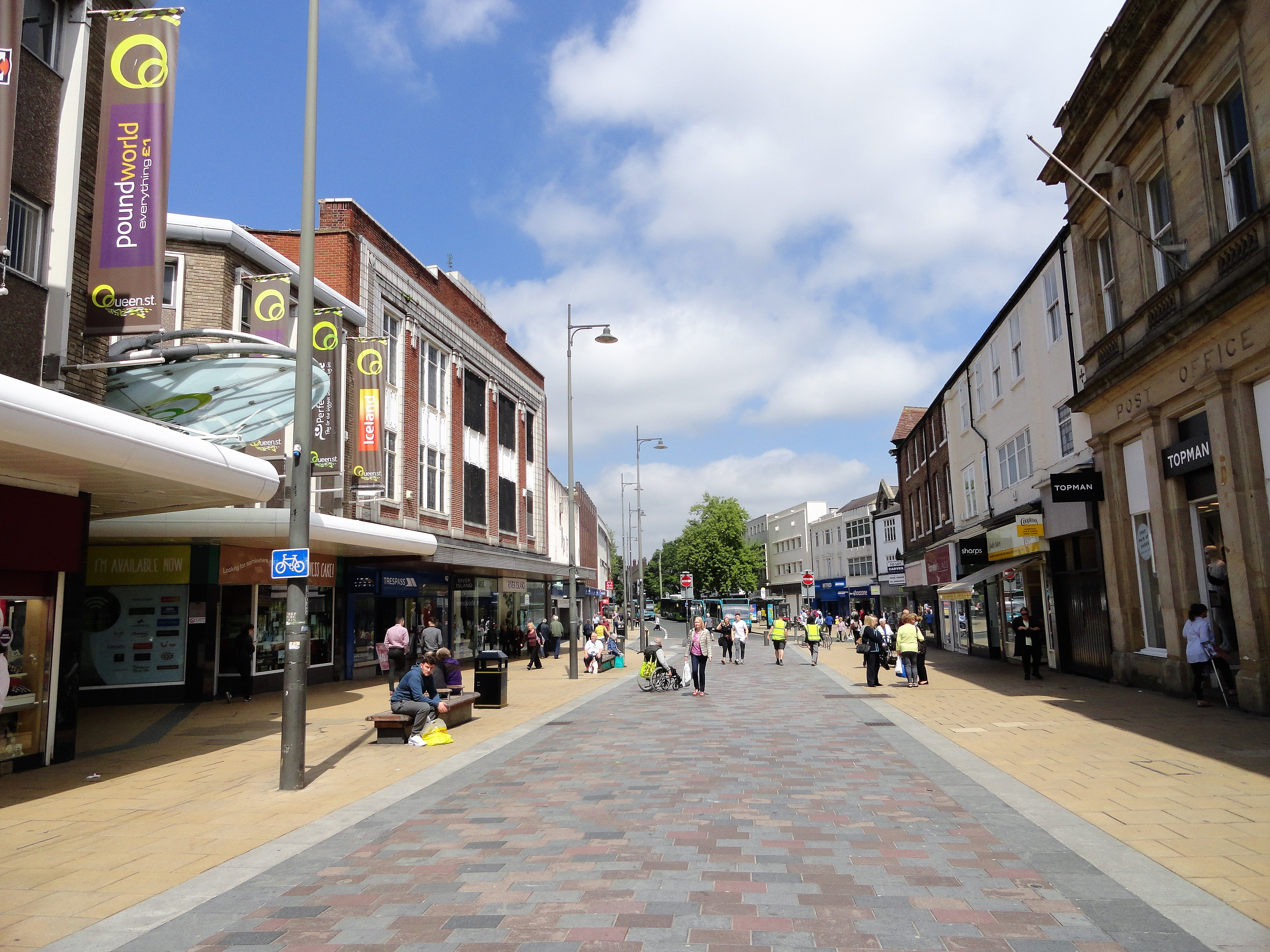
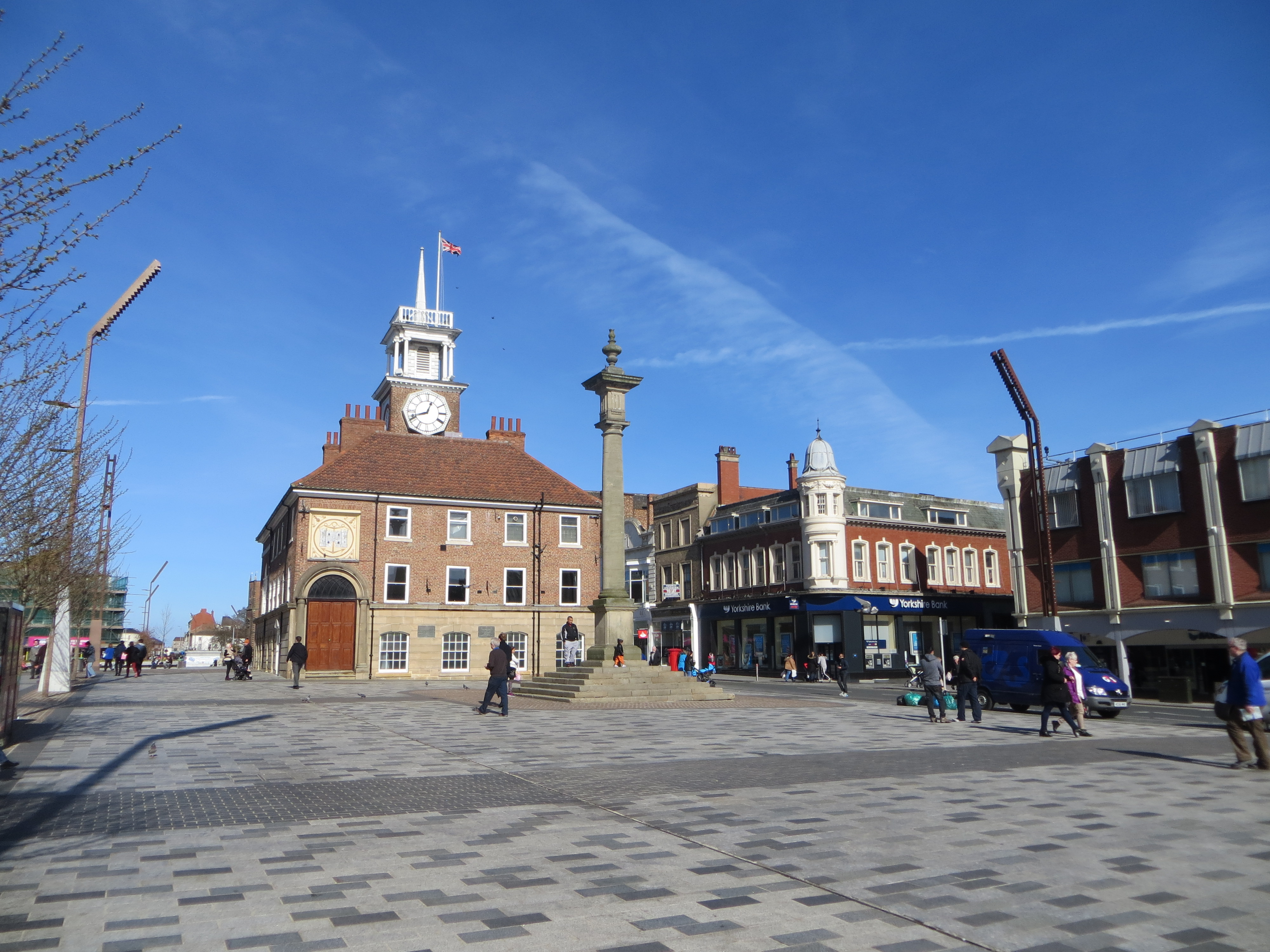
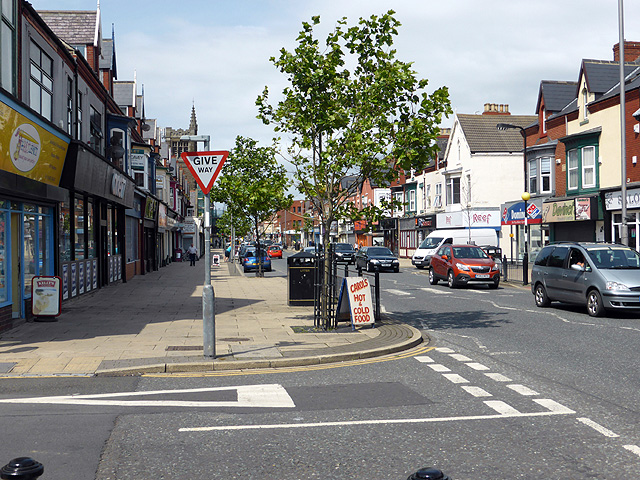
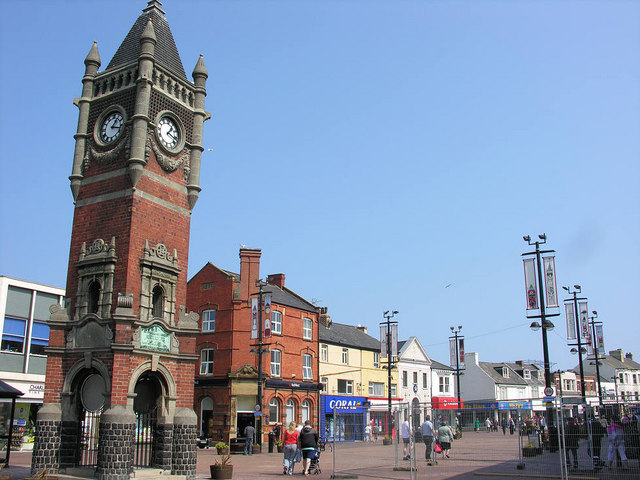
- Middlesbrough, Darlington, Stockton-on-Tees, Hartlepool and Redcar

- Wordmark

- Tees Valley shown within England
- Coordinates: 54.605°N 1.257°W
- Sovereign state: United Kingdom
- Country: England
- Region: North East
- Ceremonial counties: County Durham (north): River Tees -; North Yorkshire (south)
- LEP established: 2011
- CA established: 1 April 2016
- Named for: River Tees
- Administrative HQ: Teesside Airport Business Suite, Darlington
- Districts: List: Darlington; Hartlepool; Middlesbrough; Redcar and Cleveland; Stockton-on-Tees

Government
  - Type: Combined authority
  - Body: Tees Valley Combined Authority
  - Mayor: Ben Houchen (C)

Area
  - Total: 307 sq mi (795 km^{2})

Population (2024)
  - Total: 712,858
  - Rank: 11th
  - Density: 2,320/sq mi (897/km^{2})
- Time zone: UTC+0 (GMT)
  - Summer (DST): UTC+1 (BST)
- Postcode areas: TS; DL
- Dialling codes: 01642
- GSS code: E47000006
- Website: teesvalley-ca.gov.uk

Tees Valley is a strategic authority area in Northern England, around the lower River Tees. The area is not a geographical valley but could be considered to be based on the Tees flood plain. The combined authority covers five council areas: Darlington, Hartlepool, Middlesbrough, Redcar and Cleveland and Stockton-on-Tees: this includes areas in both County Durham and North Yorkshire counties.

The town of Middlesbrough is the largest population centre in the area. The borough of Middlesbrough is the smallest of the five, at only 54 square kilometres (21 sq mi) and a population of 156,161: the Stockton-on-Tees borough (including multiple towns) is the largest with an area of 205 square kilometres (79 sq mi) and a population of 206,800, as of 2024.

From 1968 until 1974, parts of the area were included in the County Borough of Teesside council area. This was replaced by Cleveland county; it had four borough councils which became unitary authorities after the county was abolished in 1996. Darlington became a unitary authority in 1997; the five authorities formed a Local Enterprise Partnership in 2011, further collaboration between the five authorities lead to Tees Valley Combined Authority being created in 2016.

== Background ==
The River Tees geographical valley is known as Teesdale.

For centuries, north Tees was under the Prince-bishopric of Durham. Both Darlington and Stockton had ancient wards named after them, the county was quartered with Chester-Le-Street and Easington for County Durham's named for its northern half. The southern half of County Durham in certain parishes came under a wapentake district for centuries outside of the wards, this area was named after Sadberge. Middleton St George, Hartlepool and Billingham were in Stockton ward, the latter two were also in a district called Hartness.

South Tees was under Yorkshire's North Riding; a wapentake called Langbaurgh, which was synonymous with the name Cleveland.

The eastern side of Teesdale had a wave of population increase during the Victorian Era, local government was structurally rebuilt during this time for the country. Places in the area had districts which were governed from them, this system of smaller districts remained until the mid-20th century.

Urban districts (such as Eston, Billingham and Saltburn and Marske by the Sea) and parts of rural districts, as well as municipal boroughs (such as Stockton-on-Tees, Thornaby-on-Tees and Redcar) and county boroughs (Middlesbrough) were merged into the County Borough of Teesside in 1968. However in 1974, the county borough was disbanded.

The 1974 reforms created the county of Cleveland, including Hartlepool, the former Urban Districts of Guisborough, Saltburn and Marske, Skelton and Brotton and Loftus. Four boroughs were also created to subdivide the new county.

Local government reorganisation in 1996 saw the county of Cleveland broken up: the borough councils became unitary authorities. The boroughs were assigned into the counties of North Yorkshire and County Durham for ceremonial purposes. In 1997, the Borough of Darlington also became a unitary authority. In 2016 the combined authority was formed covering the five authority areas.

== Governance ==
=== UK Parliament ===
Tees Valley is divided into seven and a part UK parliamentary borough constituencies:

- Darlington
- Hartlepool
- Middlesbrough
- Middlesbrough South and East Cleveland
- Redcar
- Sedgefield (shared with the North East Combined Authority)
- Stockton North
- Stockton South

Each constituency is made up of wards. Four constituencies were held by the Conservative Party after the 2019 general election, up by three since the 2017 general election. This was expanded to five following the 2021 Hartlepool by-election. Labour hold the other two. Sedgefield's partial seat is also represented by a Conservative MP, as of the 2019 election. The two Middlesbrough seats have the largest majorities for either party. The Middlesbrough constituency has a sizeable Labour majority, whereas the Middlesbrough South and East Cleveland constituency has a strong Conservative majority.

=== Authorities ===

1
2
Darlington
- 112,489
- 197 mi^{2}
Hartlepool
- 98,180
- 94 mi^{2}

3
4
Stockton-on-Tees
- 206,800
- 205 mi^{2}
Middlesbrough
- 156,161
- 54 mi^{2}

5
Redcar and Cleveland
- 139,228
- 245 mi^{2}

Tees Valley Combined Authority has its headquarters at Cavendish House, Thornaby. The area has 5 borough councils, each council has a representative in the combined authority. The TVCA, amends the mayor's annual budget (by two-thirds majority). It does not have the power to block the mayor's directives.

=== Mayors ===
The Mayor of Tees Valley is a directly elected politician who, along with the Combined Authority, is responsible for the strategic government of Tees Valley. There are other mayors for the boroughs of Middlesbrough and Stockton-on-Tees. Hartlepool also had a Mayor from 2002 to 2013.

The current Tees Valley Mayor is Ben Houchen. The Mayor is responsible for Tees Valley's strategic planning and is required to produce or amend a plan for each electoral cycle.

=== Lord Lieutenants ===
Two Lord-lieutenants (Durham and North Yorkshire) are appointed by the borough's ceremonial counties.

== Economy ==
The following is a chart of the Gross Value Added to the UK economy by the Tees Valley Combined Authority region, aggregated by industry.

Nominal Gross Value Added (£ millions)
Year	Agriculture, Forestry & Fishing; Mining & Quarrying; Electricity & Gas; Water, Sewage & Waste Management	Manufacturing	Construction	Wholesale & Retail Trade; Transportation & Storage; Accommodation & Food Services	IT	Finance	Real Estate	Professional, Scientific & Technical; Administration & Support Services	Public Administration & Defence; Compulsory Social Security; Education; Health & Social Work	Arts & Recreation; Other	Total
1998	411	1,670	403	1,223	265	249	1,147	522	1,394	229	7,513
2000	421	1,676	521	1,300	330	231	1,195	551	1,567	259	8,050
2002	461	1,553	577	1,577	467	239	1,226	553	1,709	334	8,696
2004	601	1,690	646	1,800	522	373	1,272	747	2,060	377	10,087
2006	775	1,655	774	1,836	534	511	1,363	772	2,260	384	10,864
2008	718	1,852	816	1,936	515	458	1,466	820	2,487	409	11,478
2010	723	1,859	705	2,067	445	453	1,369	886	2,706	406	11,620
2012	720	1,665	781	1,853	482	511	1,581	1,005	2,775	411	11,784
2014	766	1,657	774	2,141	688	481	1,570	1,107	2,918	375	12,478
2016	649	1,684	762	2,489	665	431	1,654	1,109	2,948	411	12,803

=== Enterprise zone ===
The Tees Valley Enterprise Zone is an enterprise zone which encourages industrial development. It was initiated by the local enterprise partnership Tees Valley Unlimited and its creation was announced by the government in 2011. At its launch, the zone contained 12 sites. Four of these sites offer enhanced capital allowances, aimed at large manufacturers. These sites are Wilton International and South Bank Wharf, both in Redcar and Cleveland, Port Estates in Hartlepool and New Energy and Technology Park in Billingham, Stockton-on-Tees. The remaining sites offer reduced business rates. In March 2015 the government announced that a thirteenth site is to be added, South Bank Wharf Prairie, aimed at oil and gas decommissioning business.

=== Businesses ===
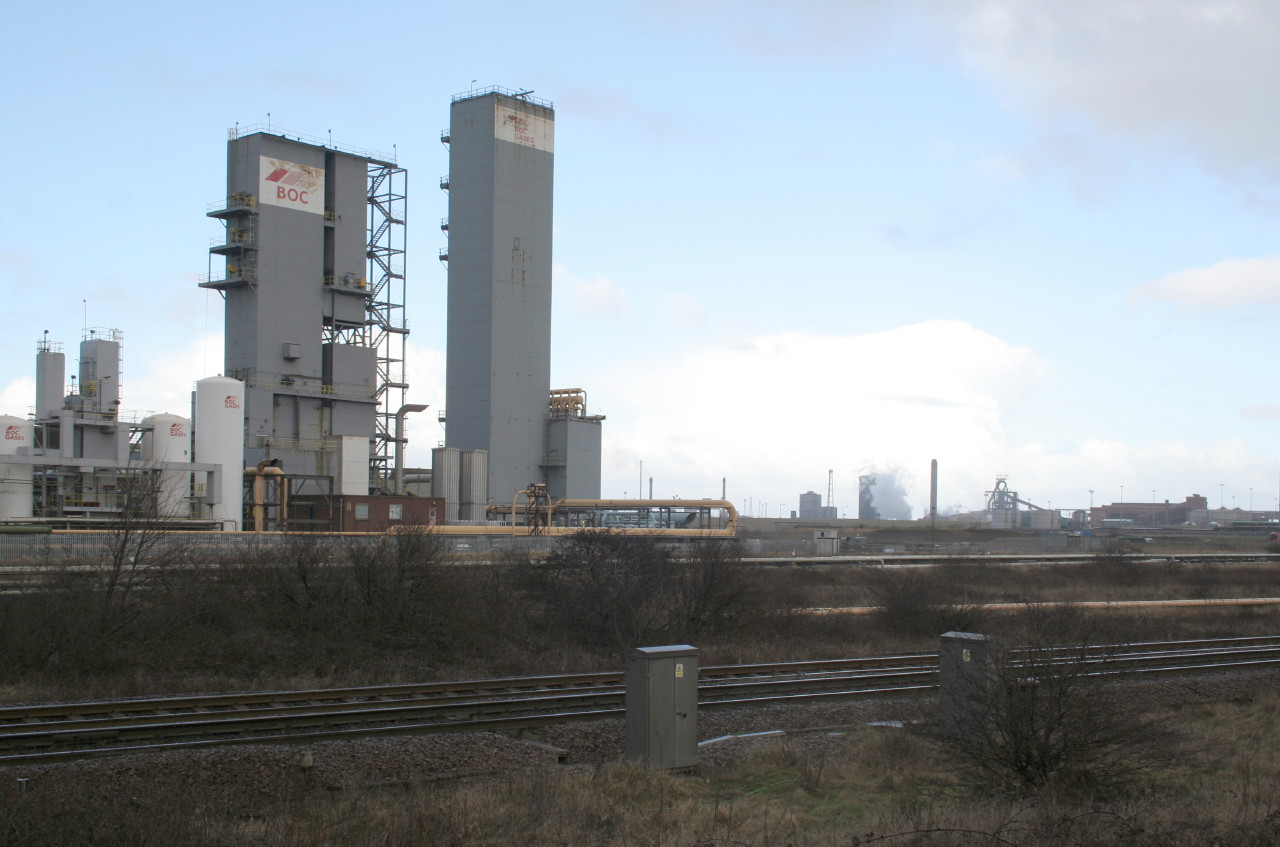
BOC plant on Teesside

Imperial Chemical Industries (ICI) operated here until the late 1990s on three chemical sites at Wilton, Billingham and Seal Sands. ICI was broken up, and its many chemical manufacturing units are now operated by a large number of companies that have acquired its assets. The Centre for Process Innovation (CPI), a national innovation catapult, is based at the Wilton Centre, the former corporate headquarters of ICI, which has become a multi-company research and development centre: along with CPI there are now some 60 other companies, including the cluster body NEPIC, using these R&D and business development facilities. This centre is now one of Europe's largest R&D facilities focusing on developments in the chemistry-based process industries. The area is a chemicals processing area, but recently it has diversified to become the UK's leading site for renewable biofuel research. This industrial activity is taking place in a collaborative environment facilitated by the economic cluster body, the North East of England Process Industry Cluster (NEPIC).

Hartlepool has a nuclear power station, and there is a conventional CHP power station and a biomass power station operated by Sembcorp on the Wilton chemical site.Hereema Fabrication Group make North Sea platforms at the A1048/A179 roundabout in Hartlepool.

Wilton Engineering's 50 acre fabrication and maintenance site is in Port Clarence. Barker and Stonehouse make furniture north of Middlesbrough next to the A66/A178 junction. The Teesside Steelworks near Redcar was the biggest blast furnace in Europe and was operated in its final years by Sahaviriya Steel Industries (SSI). Tata Steel Europe operate a pipe works at Hartlepool, whilst British Steel operate a heavy beam mill near Middlesbrough and a special sections mill at Skinningrove Steelworks. Able UK operate the biggest dry dock in the UK near Seaton Carew, Hartlepool where ships can be dismantled and oil rigs can be dismantled or refurbished.

The many chemistry-based businesses on Teesside include Huntsman Tioxide plant at Greatham makes titanium dioxide. Huntsman's European headquarters are in Wynyard. Johnson Matthey Catalysts and Fujifilm Dyosynth Biologics have manufacturing units in Billingham while the Lucite International Acrylics factory and the Mitsubishi battery chemical plant are on the other side of the town. Exwold Technology operate their two extrusion and packaging facilities in Hartlepool. Banner Chemicals are adjacent to the A66 in Middlesbrough. Aldous Huxley's visit to the former ICI plant in Billingham inspired Brave New World and this unit now makes fertiliser for Growhow, using 1% of the UK's natural gas. SABIC petrochemicals and polymers, Lotte Chemicals PET and PTA plants, Biffa recycled polymers, Huntsman polyurethanes and the Ensus Biofuels all operate at Wilton. ConocoPhillips refinery, BP Cats, Harvest Energy Biodiesel unit, Greenery Fuels, Fine Organics, Vertelus speciality chemicals and Ineos Nitriles are all based at Seal Sands, with Vopak and Simon Storage tank storage businesses nearby. Sita are upgrading their unit at Haverton Hill. Marlow Foods produce Quorn, and KP Snacks make McCoy's in Billingham. Santander UK's mortgages division is located in Thornaby. Tetley Tea have had their only tea bag factory in the UK at Eaglescliffe, in the borough of Stockton-on-Tees, since 1969. It is the largest tea bag factory in the world and makes 18 billion tea bags a year. Its distribution centre is at nearby Newton Aycliffe in County Durham.

=== Teesport ===
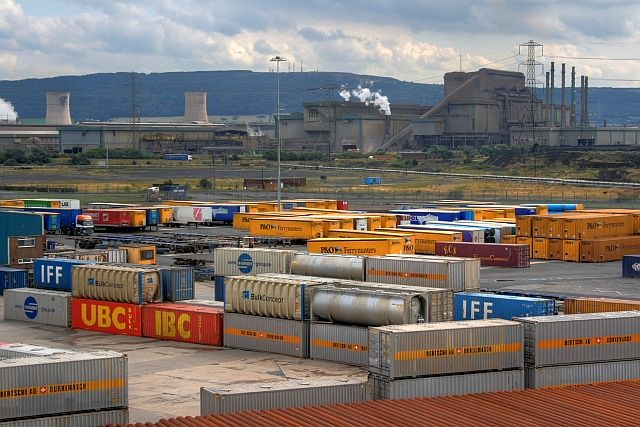
Teesport

Teesport is on the River Tees and is currently the third largest port in the United Kingdom, and amongst the ten biggest in Western Europe, in terms of tonnage shipped. Its size is due to the local steel and chemical industries.

This port handles over 56 million tonnes of goods per annum which are mainly associated with the local petrochemical, chemical and steel processing industries.

The port is an important piece of logistical infrastructure for the NEPIC cluster of process companies. PD Ports, who own Teesport, is headquartered in Middlesbrough adjacent to Middlesbrough railway station.

== Demographics ==
Population of Tees Valley by district (2024)
District	Land area		Population		Density (/km^{2})
District	(km^{2})	(%)	People	(%)	Density (/km^{2})
Darlington	197	25%	112,489	16%	570
Hartlepool	94	12%	98,180	14%	1,048
Middlesbrough	54	7%	156,161	22%	2,898
Redcar and Cleveland	245	31%	139,228	20%	568
Stockton-on-Tees	205	26%	206,800	29%	1,009
Tees Valley	795	100%	712,858	100%	897

== Landmarks ==
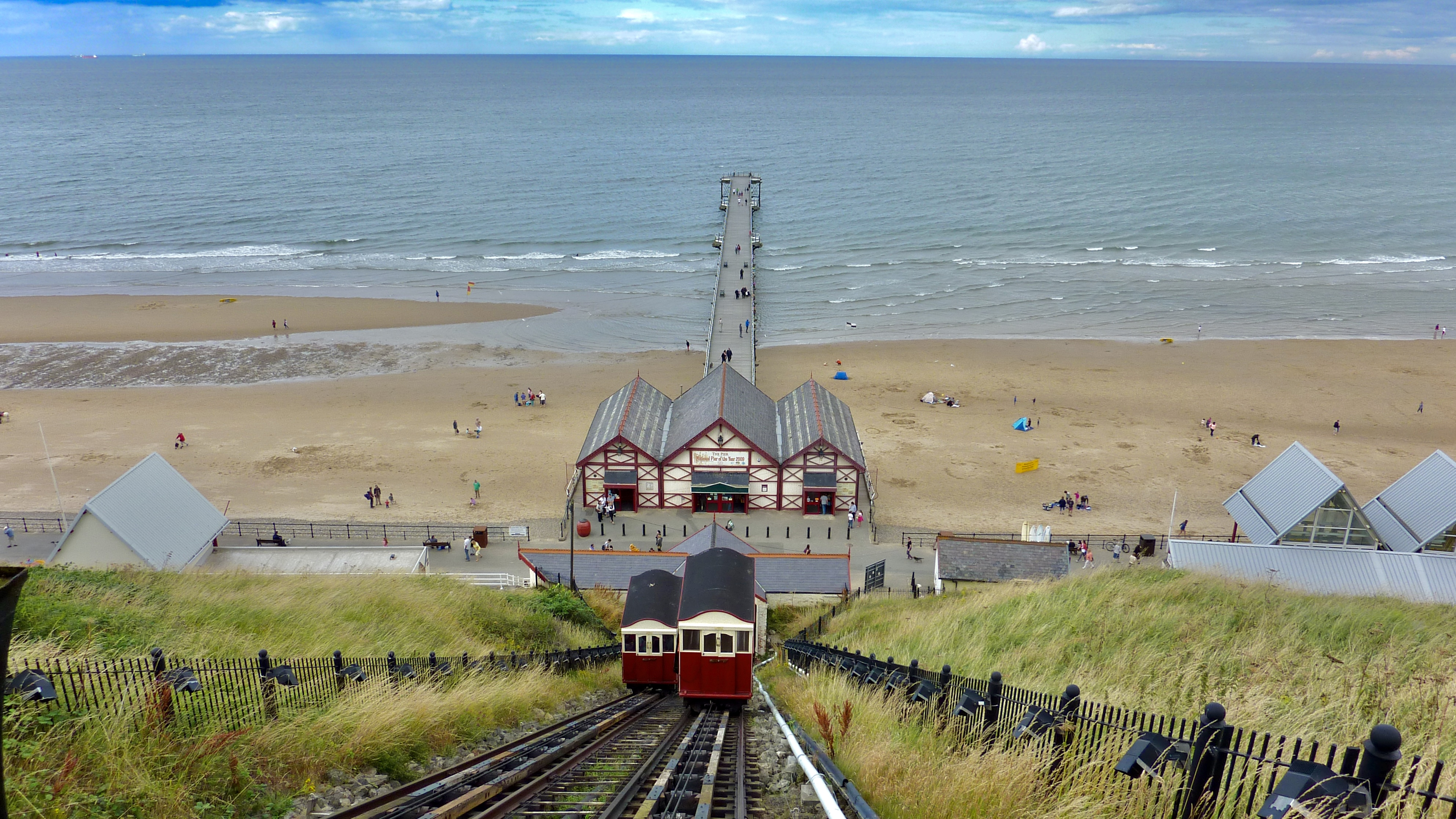
Saltburn's pier and cliff lift

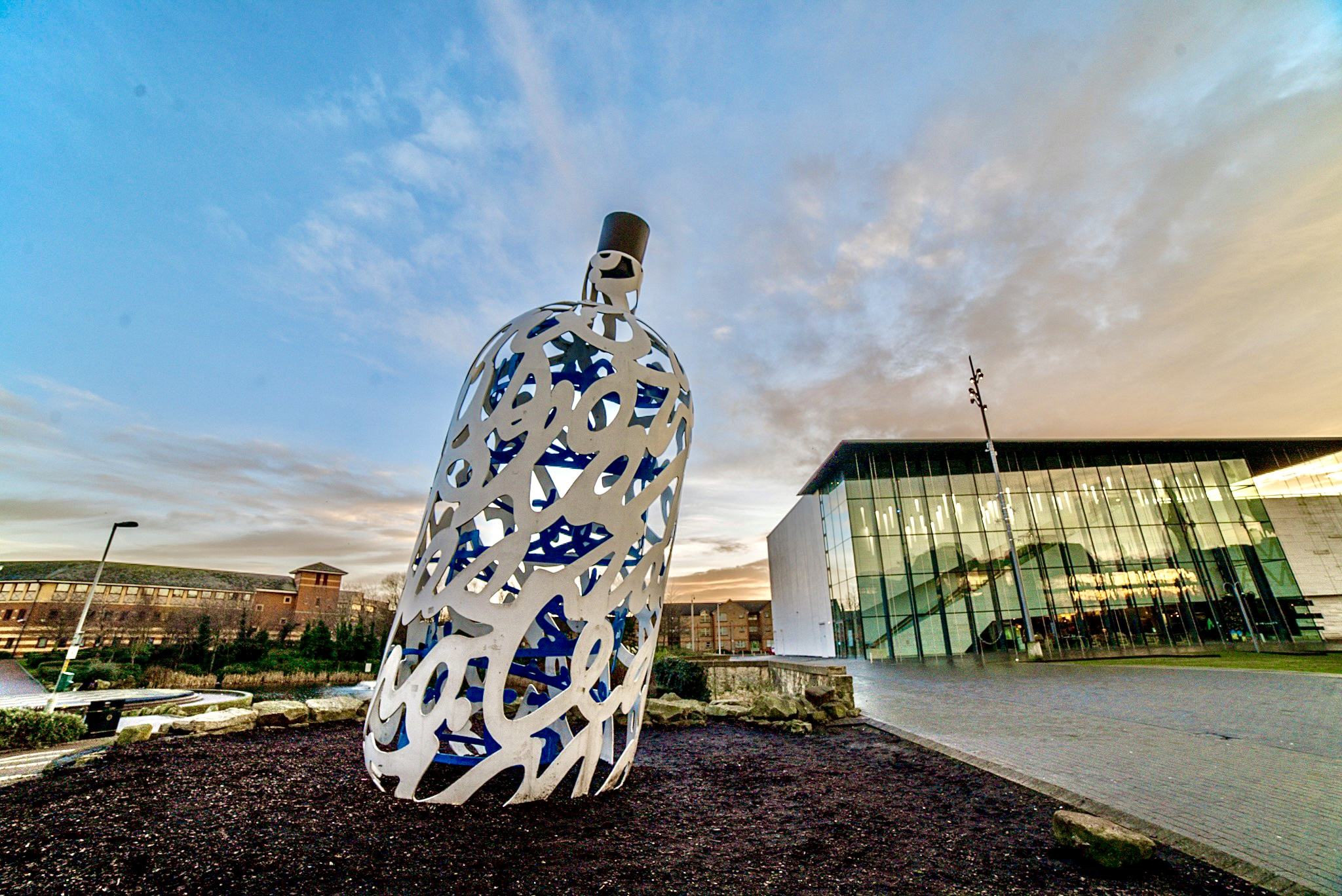
'Bottle O' Notes' sculpture and Middlesbrough Institute of Modern Art (MIMA)

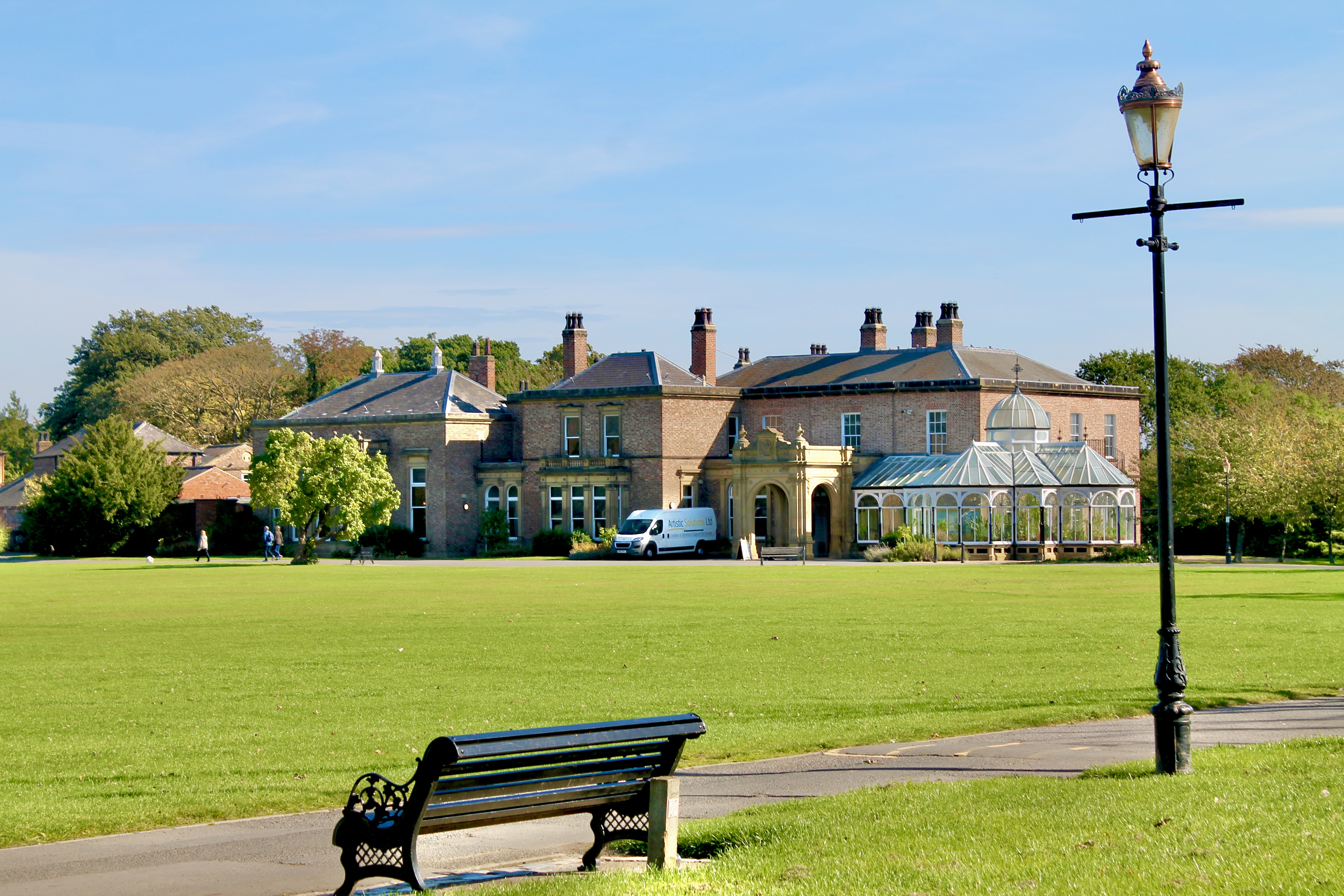
Preston Hall

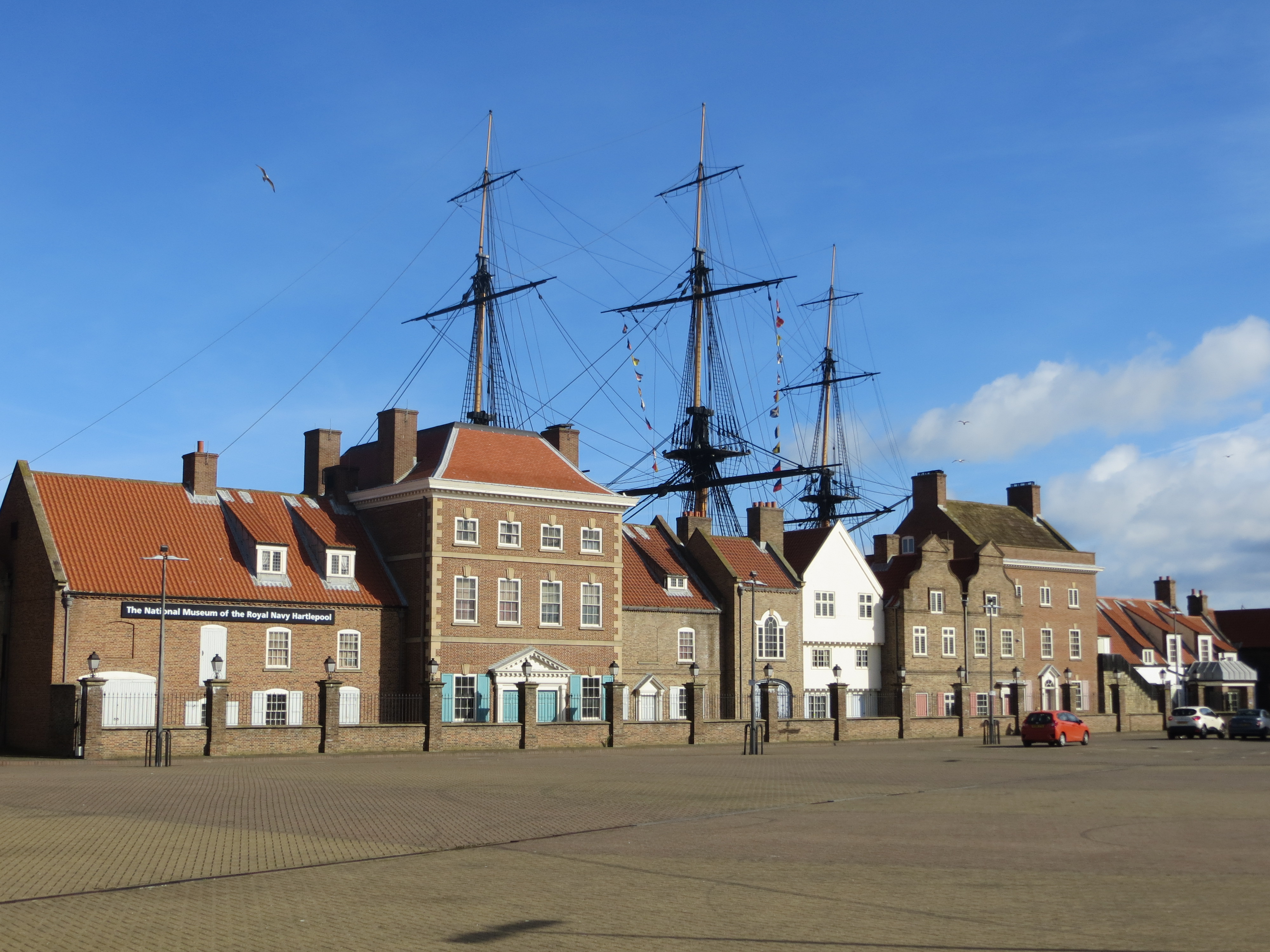
NMRN Hartlepool

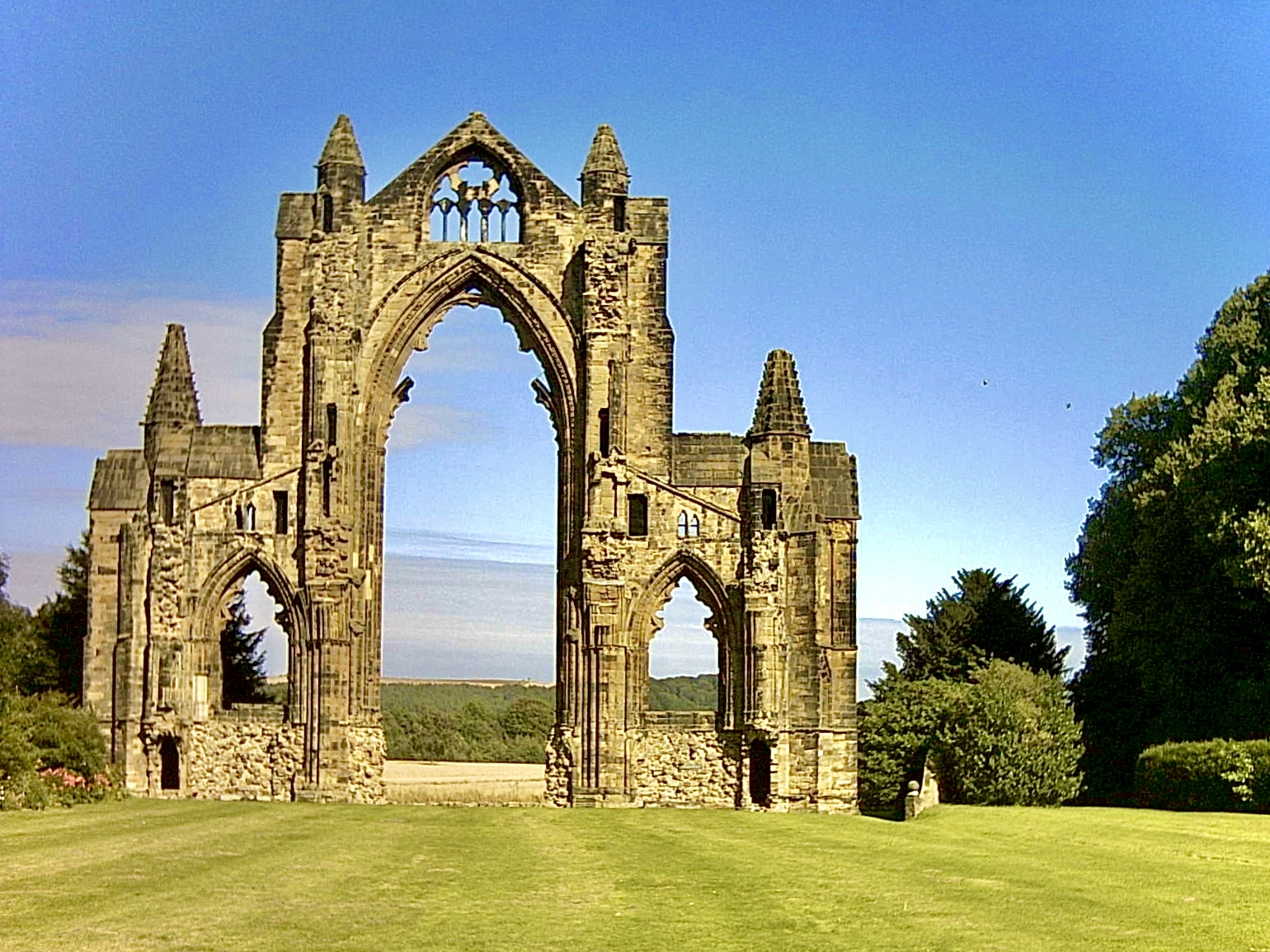
Guisborough priory

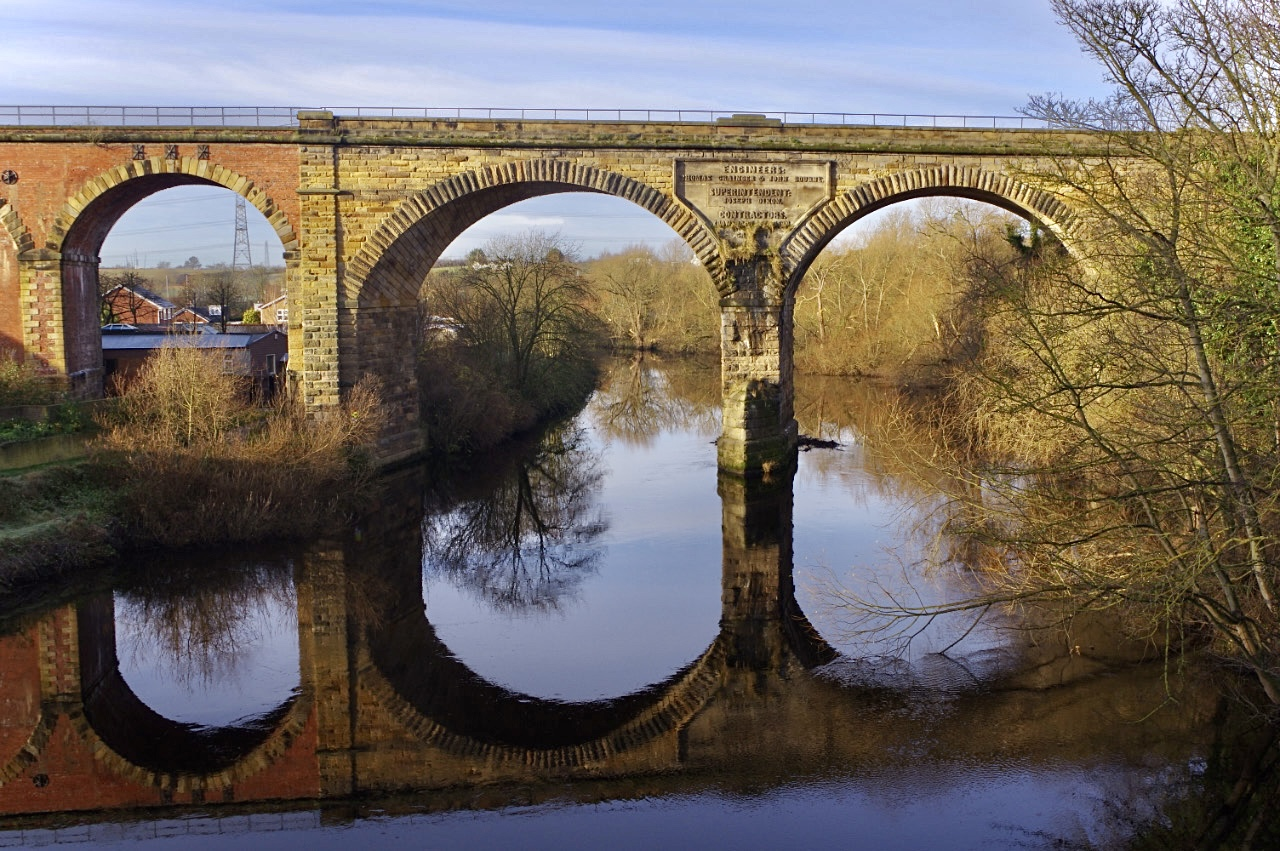
Yarm Viaduct

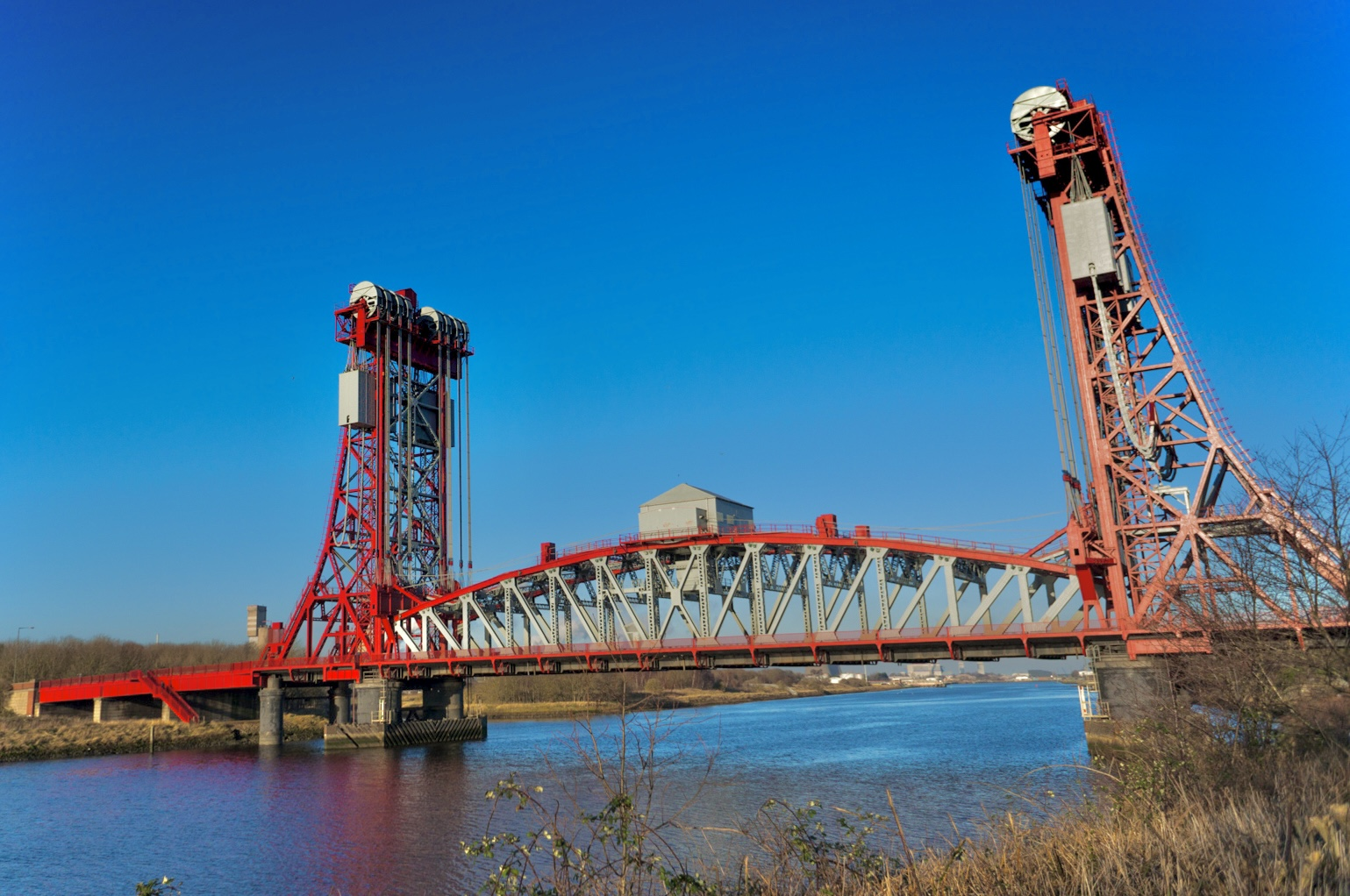
Tees Newport Bridge

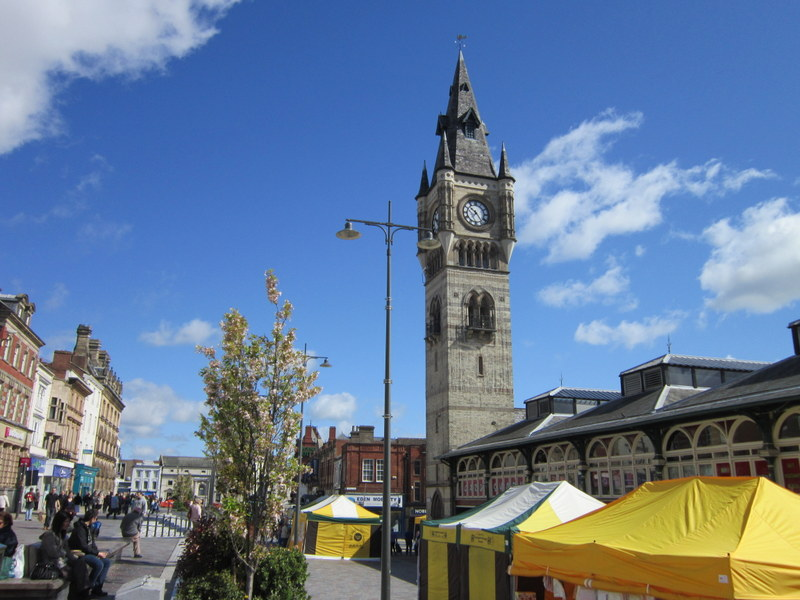
Darlington Market Hall with clock tower

== Transport ==
=== Road ===
Main

Road	Route	Notes
A1(M)	Darlington western bypass. South to Leeds and North to Tyne and Wear	A motorway standard stretch of the A1
A19	South for the rest of Yorkshire and North to Tyne and Wear.	Between Stockton & Middlesbrough, then Stockton & Hartlepool, as aproxoximate borough borders.
A66	Most of Tees Valley is served, terminating between Middlesbrough and Redcar, linking to Hartlepool via the A19, running to the west coast of England.	The road is motorway standard around Darlington.
A67	Darlington to Stockton	It is the main road for Teesside Airport, running adjacent to the railway, and was previously designated as the A66 from Darlington to Eaglescliffe and A19, Eaglescliffe southwards through Yarm.
A68	Darlington to Edinburgh	Runs west of Darlington.

Triple-digit roads

Road	From	To	Notes
A135 (Yarm Road)	Stockton-on-Tees	Egglescliffe	
A139	Stockton-on-Tees	Billingham	
A167	Topcliffe	Kenton Bar	
A171	A66 as Cargo Fleet Lane	Scarborough	Until the road goes out of the region, it is also known as: Sunnyfields, Orchard Way, Ormesby Bank, Middlesbrough Road, Whitby Road, Fancy Bank, Birk Brow Road & Fancy Bank
A172	A66 as Marton Road, Middlesbrough	A19 as Stocking Hill	also known as Stokesley Road, Pannierman Lane & Dixons Bank
A173	A172 (Middlesbrough)	Skelton-in-Cleveland	Also known as Church Lane & Skelton Ellers.
A174	Thornaby	Whitby	As the road goes out of the region, it is known for a short stretch, as Apple Orchard Bank
A177	Stockton	Durham	
A178	Middlesbrough	Hartlepool	
A179	A19	Hartlepool	

Bus

Most of the area is served by Stagecoach's Tees Flex network, a pre-bookable service running in and around the valley, mainly serving Stockton on Tees, Darlington and Redcar and Cleveland. Services are operated by a dedicated fleet of Mercedes-Benz Sprinter minibuses.

=== Rail ===
Stations The stations, by borough, are as follows:

- Darlington:
  - Darlington, North Road, Dinsdale and Teesside Airport
- Hartlepool:
  - Hartlepool and Seaton Carew
- Stockton-on-Tees:
  - Stockton, Billingham, Allens West, Eaglescliffe, Thornaby and Yarm
- Middlesbrough:
  - Gypsy Lane, James Cook, Marton, Middlesbrough and Nunthorpe
- Redcar and Cleveland:
  - Redcar Central and Redcar East, South Bank, Longbeck, Marske and Saltburn.

Lines

Commuter rail services linked with lInes from Tees Valley to Durham and Tyne and Wear

- Darlington is connected to the East Coast Main Line (ECML) and provides fast connections to London and Edinburgh. From May 2018, the UK Government announced that the line was to be re-nationalised for the second time since privatisation in 1997.

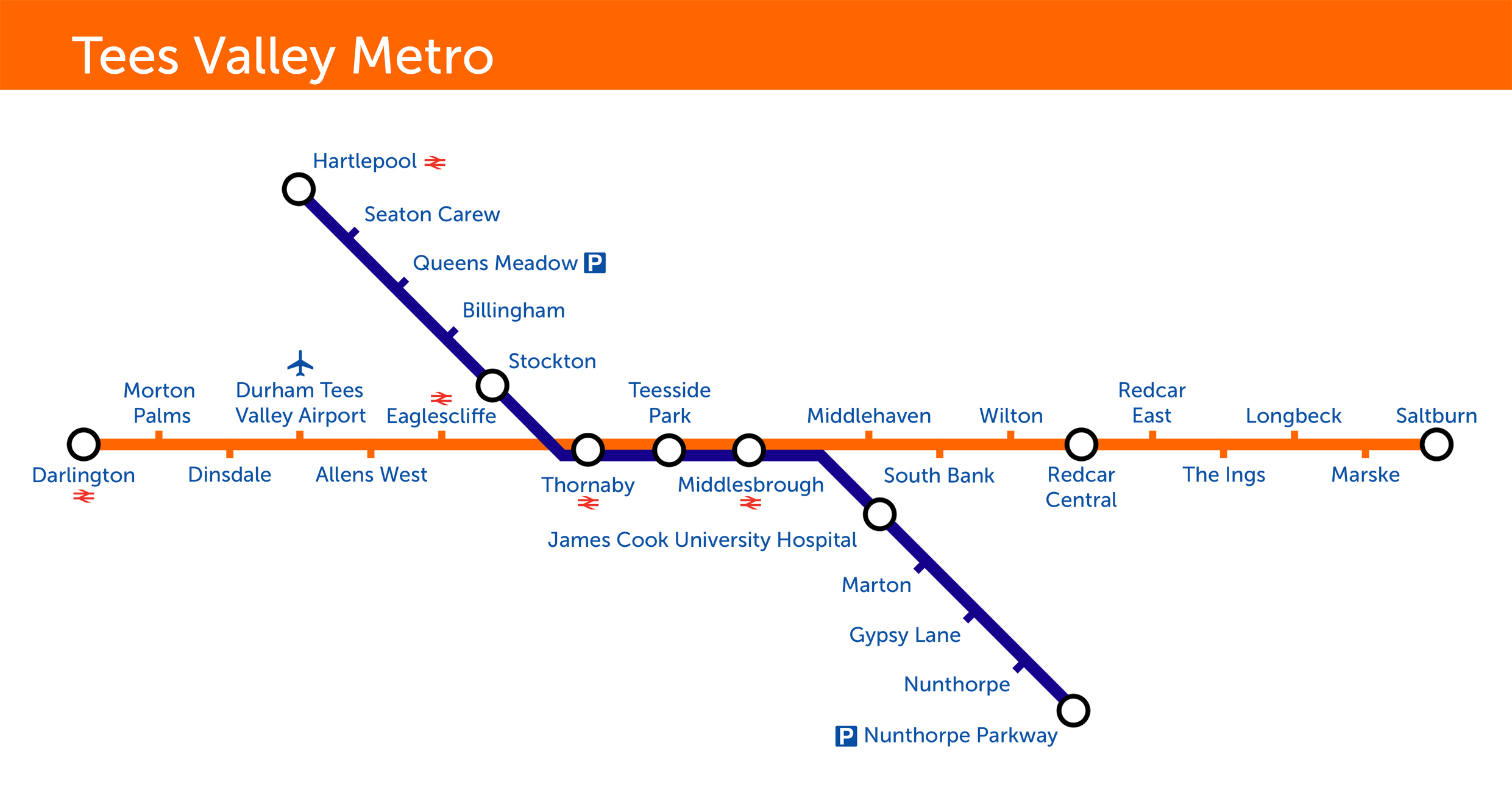
previously proposed Tees Valley Metro route showing most current stations in the region along with proposed stations not built at the present time

- Tees Valley line, serves most of the area and links to Darlington and Teesside Airport station, with sections being the former Stockton & Darlington Railway.
- Durham Coast Line, connects Hartlepool, Stockton, Thornaby and Middlesbrough with the main line.
- Northallerton–Eaglescliffe Line, connects Eaglescliffe and Yarm with Durham Coast Line.
- Esk Valley line: serves most Middlesbrough stations

Services

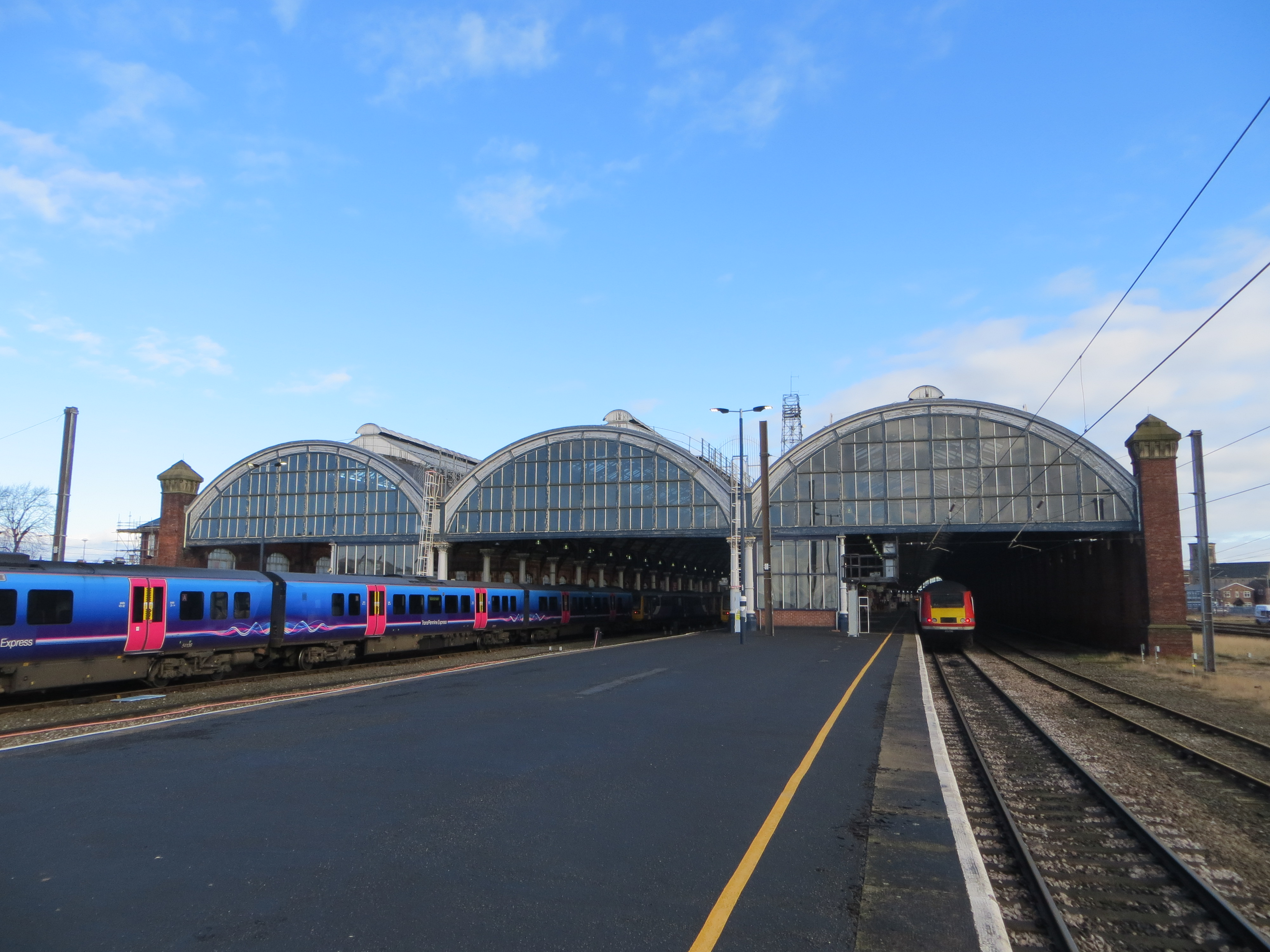
Darlington railway station

York-based LNER serves the full length of the ECML and operates Darlington railway station. There is also a daily LNER service from Middlesbrough to London King's Cross, while Grand Central has linked Teesside with London since December 2007 with a non-stop from York onwards. It does not have electric trains, and uses the Northallerton–Eaglescliffe Line and Durham Coast Line. CrossCountry operate regular services from Darlington to Newcastle-Upon-Tyne, Scotland, Leeds, Birmingham and southwest England.

Local-service routes in the Tees Valley are provided by Northern Trains. TransPennine Express has inter-regional services from Saltburn to Manchester Airport, via Leeds.

=== Air ===
Teesside International Airport serves the area and has a regular service from Amsterdam, Schiphol airport.

== Media ==
=== Television ===
The area is served by BBC North East and Cumbria and ITV Tyne Tees, the local based-television station Local TV Teesside also broadcast to the area. Television signals are received from either the Pontop Pike or Bilsdale TV transmitters.

=== Radio ===
Radio stations for the area are:

BBC Local Radio

- BBC Radio Tees

Independent Radio

- Capital North East
- Greatest Hits Radio Teesside
- Heart North East
- Hits Radio Teesside
- Nation Radio North East
- Smooth North East

Community Radio

- Zetland FM (serving Redcar and Cleveland)
- CVFM Radio (for Middlesbrough)
- Alpha Radio Darlington
- Radio Hartlepool

=== Newspapers ===
Tees Valley is served by these local newspapers:

- Darlington & Stockton Times
- Evening Gazette (TeessideLive online)
- Hartlepool Mail
- The Northern Echo

== Sport ==
=== Football ===
==== Association ====
Division	Club	Ground	Location
EFL Championship	Middlesbrough	Riverside Stadium	Middlesbrough, North Yorkshire
National League	Hartlepool United	Victoria Park	Hartlepool, County Durham
National League North	Darlington	Blackwell Meadows	Darlington, County Durham
Northern League Division One	Marske United	Mount Pleasant	Marske, North Yorkshire
Northern Premier League Premier Division	Stockton Town	Bishopton Road West	Stockton, County Durham
Northern Premier League Division One East	Guisborough Town	King George V Ground	Guisborough, North Yorkshire
Northern Premier League Premier Division	Redcar Athletic	Green Lane	Redcar, North Yorkshire
Northern League Division One	Thornaby	Teesdale Park	Thornaby, North Yorkshire
Northern League Division Two	Billingham Synthonia	Stokesley Sports Complex	Stokesley, North Yorkshire (Note: Ground sharing until new ground found or built in or nearer their place of origin)
	Boro Rangers	Stokesley Sports Complex	Stokesley, North Yorkshire
Northern League Division Two	Billingham Town	Bedford Terrace	Billingham, County Durham
Northern League Division One	Redcar Town	Mo Mowlam Memorial Park	Redcar, North Yorkshire
North Riding League Premier Division	Darlington Railway Athletic	Brinkburn Road	Darlington, County Durham
	Norton and Stockton Ancients	Norton Sports Complex	Norton, County Durham

Wearside League also host:

- FC Hartlepool, Hartlepool, County Durham
- Wynyard Village, Wynyard (Stockton), County Durham

Under the Northern League there is also the North Riding Football League, founded in 2017 by a merger of Teesside Football League and the Eskvale & Cleveland League

In the women's football pyramid, Middlesbrough and the Norton and Stockton Ancients play in the fourth tier (Division One North).

==== Rugby Union ====
As of the 2022-2 season, there are fourteen Rugby Union Football Clubs in the region, Darlington Mowden Park is in the highest division compared to the rest of the clubs:

Division	Club	Stadium	Location
National League 1	Darlington Mowden Park R.F.C.	Northern Echo Arena	Darlington, County Durham
National League 2 North	Billingham RUFC	Greenwood Road	Billingham, County Durham
Regional 2 North	Middlesbrough RUFC	Acklam Park	Acklam, Middlesbrough, North Yorkshire
Counties 1 Durham & Northumberland	Stockton RFC	Grangefield Ground	Stockton-on-Tees, County Durham
Counties 1 Durham & Northumberland	Acklam R.U.F.C.	Talbot Park	Acklam, Middlesbrough, North Yorkshire
Counties 1 Durham & Northumberland	Darlington RFC	Blackwell Meadows	Darlington, County Durham
Counties 1 Durham & Northumberland	Hartlepool	Mayfield Park	Hartlepool, County Durham
Counties 1 Durham & Northumberland	Hartlepool Rovers	The New Friarage	Hartlepool, County Durham
Counties 1 Durham & Northumberland	Guisborough	Belmangate	Guisborough, North Yorkshire
Counties 1 Durham & Northumberland	West Hartlepool R.F.C.	Brinkburn	Hartlepool, County Durham
Counties 2 Durham & Northumberland	Redcar RUFC	Mackinlay Park	Redcar, North Yorkshire
Counties 3 Durham & Northumberland	DMP Elizabethans	Northern Echo Arena	Darlington, County Durham
Counties 3 Durham & Northumberland	Seaton Carew	Hornby Park	Seaton Carew, County Durham
Counties 3 Durham & Northumberland	West Hartlepool T.D.S.O.B.	John Howard Park	Hartlepool, County Durham
Counties 3 Durham & Northumberland	Yarm	Wass Way	Eaglescliffe, County Durham

=== Cricket ===
ECB PL's North Yorkshire and South Durham Cricket League:

County Durham
- Darlington:
  - Darlington Cricket Club
  - Darlington Railway Athletic Cricket Club
  - Middleton St George
  - Haughton
- Hartlepool:
  - Hartlepool
  - Seaton Carew
  - Hartlepool Power Station
- Stockton (North Tees)
  - Cowpen
  - Norton
  - Billingham Synthonia
  - Stockton
North Yorkshire
- Stockton (South Tees):
  - Durham Palatinates
  - Thornaby
  - Maltby
  - Yarm
- Middlesbrough:
  - Middlesbrough
  - Smiths Dock
  - Normanby Hall
  - Marton
  - Guisborough
- Redcar & Cleveland
  - Redcar
  - Marske
  - Saltburn

=== Basketball ===
- Tees Valley Mohawks
- Teesside Lions

== See also ==
- Tees Valley Wildlife Trust
- Tees Valley Youth Orchestra
