= DTVA =

DTVA may refer to:

- Disney Television Animation, an American animation studio
- Teesside International Airport previously known as Durham Tees Valley Airport
