= ALW =

ALW may refer to:

- A-League Women, the top level professional women's football league in Australia
- Allens West railway station, Eaglescliffe, North East England
- Alternative Liste Wien, forerunner of the Austrian Green Party in Vienna
- ALW cipher, an informal name for the English Qaballa
- American League West, one of the six divisions of Major League Baseball in the US
- Andrew Lloyd Webber, British composer of musical theatre
- Walla Walla Regional Airport in Walla Walla, Washington, US, (IATA and FAA LID code : ALW)
