= European Cargo =

British cargo airline

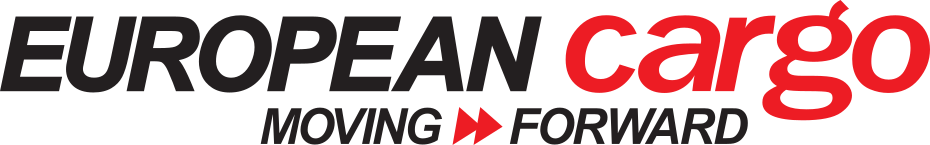

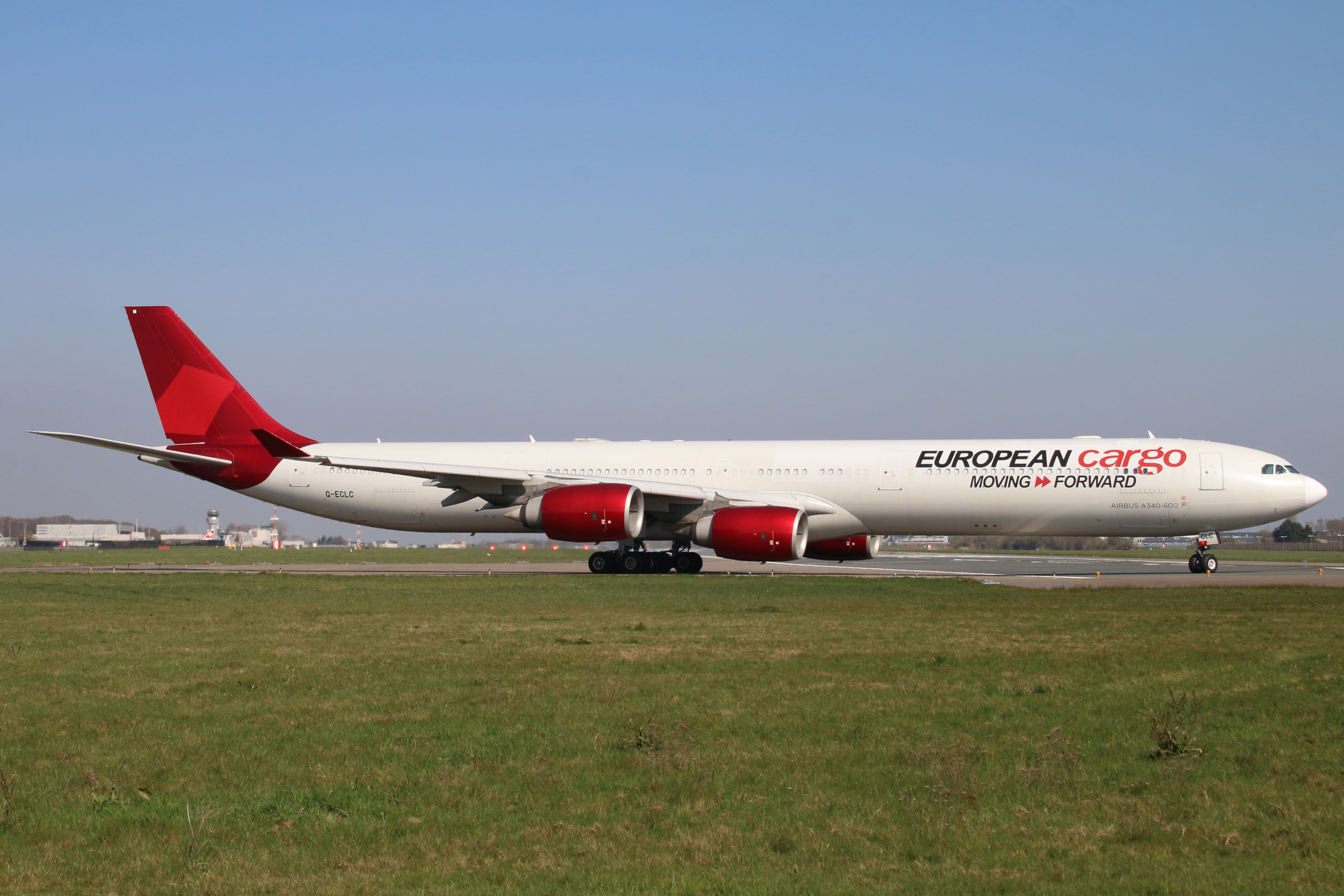
IATA	ICAO	Call sign
SE	URO	EURO
- Founded: 2020
- Commenced operations: April 2020
- Ceased operations: 19 May 2026
- Hubs: Bournemouth Airport; Teesside International Airport
- Fleet size: 9
- Destinations: 8
- Parent company: Priority 1 Holdings
- Key people: Paul Stoddart (founder) Jason Holt, Iain Edwards

European Cargo was a British cargo airline based at Bournemouth Airport, England, operating a fleet of Airbus A340-600 converted freighters.

== History ==
=== PPE charter flights ===
European Cargo began operations in April 2020 when its parent company, European Aviation Air Charter (inoperative as an airline but still active in other aviation businesses), responded to an urgent request by the UK government for PPE transport from Malaysia. The carrier operated an initial series of freight services operated by Maleth-Aero of Malta using former Virgin Atlantic Airbus A340-600 aircraft, which were painted in commemorative liveries as a tribute to the National Health Service.

=== Establishment of permanent operation ===
In December 2020, European Cargo Limited was registered at Companies House, and shortly thereafter began to take over the operation of the A340-600 airliners from Maltese partner Maleth-Aero. These aircraft were placed on the UK register beginning in February 2021.

European Cargo began converting its widebody fleet into permanent freight configuration (the aircraft had been operating as temporary preighters - passenger aircraft temporarily repurposed for freight operations) in 2022, with the first of these certified by the EASA in December of that year. The airline also received investment from Priority 1, a US logistics broker, in 2022. In April 2023, European Cargo opened a new route from Bournemouth to Chengdu, and also began fresh fish charters between Harstad/Narvik Airport, Evenes and Heathrow Airport. In March 2026, they opened a new base at Teesside International Airport, with five weekly flights to Ürümqi Tianshan International Airport.

Operations ceased on 19 May 2026, with it later placed in administration on 3 June. It was later confirmed on 3 June 2026 that the airline had entered administration, with Teneo Financial Advisory Limited being appointed as joint administrators.

== Destinations ==
European Cargo served the following scheduled destinations, alongside a variety of charter routes:

Country	City	Airport	Notes
Austria	Vienna	Vienna International Airport	
China	Chengdu	Chengdu Shuangliu International Airport	
China	Chongqing	Chongqing Jiangbei International Airport	
China	Haikou	Haikou Meilan International Airport	
China	Ürümqi	Ürümqi Tianshan International Airport	
Norway	Harstad	Harstad/Narvik Airport	Seasonal
United Kingdom	Bournemouth	Bournemouth Airport	
United Kingdom	Teesside	Teesside International Airport	

== Fleet ==
As of March 2026, prior to closure, European Cargo operated the following aircraft:

Aircraft	Operational	Stored/maintenance	Due	Notes
Airbus A340-600	3		-	
Airbus A340-600P2F	6		-	

The airline had previously operated the following aircraft:

- 4 Airbus A340-500
