= Teesside International Airport =

Airport in County Durham, England

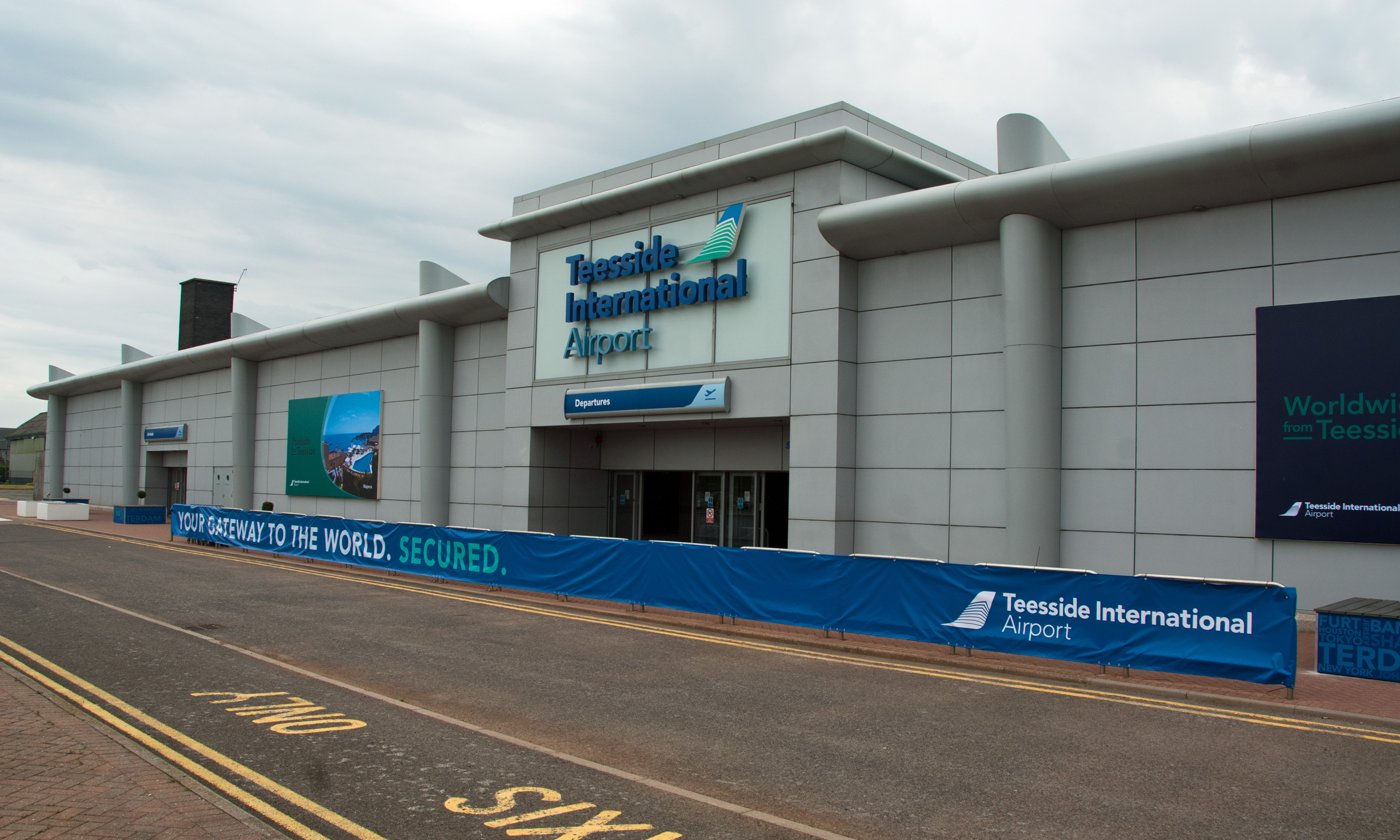
- IATA: MME; ICAO: EGNV

Summary
- Airport type: Public
- Owner: Tees Valley Combined Authority (75%); Teesside Airport Foundation (25%)
- Serves: Tees Valley, County Durham, and North Yorkshire
- Location: Middleton St George, Borough of Darlington, County Durham, England
- Elevation AMSL: 120 ft (37 m)
- Coordinates: 54°30′33″N 001°25′46″W
- Website: www.teessideinternational.com

Map
- Location in County Durham EGNV (the United Kingdom) EGNV (Europe)

Runways
Direction	Length		Surface
Direction	m	ft	Surface
05/23	2,291	7,516	Asphalt

Statistics (2025)
- Passengers: 261,440
- Passenger change 2024/25: ▲14.6%
- Aircraft movements: 20,822
- Movements change 2024/25: ▲9.8%
- Sources: UK AIP at NATS; Statistics from the UK Civil Aviation Authority

Teesside International Airport (IATA: MME, ICAO: EGNV), formerly Durham Tees Valley Airport, is a small international airport in the Borough of Darlington, County Durham, England. It primarily serves Teesside (including Middlesbrough and Stockton-on-Tees), County Durham (including Darlington) and North Yorkshire.

The airport has a Civil Aviation Authority (CAA) Public Use Aerodrome Licence that allows flights for the public transport of passengers and for flight instruction. Tees Valley Combined Authority owns three-quarters of the airport and Teesside Airport Foundation owns the remainder.

== History ==
=== RAF Middleton St George ===
The aerodrome began life in January 1941 as Royal Air Force Station Middleton St. George or RAF Goosepool as known to the locals (though it has never officially held that name). It was the most northerly of all Bomber Command airfields, home to both Royal Air Force and Royal Canadian Air Force squadrons during WWII, and exclusively RAF post-war. Of the many military aircraft based at the aerodrome, it is best known as home to the Avro Lancaster during the war and English Electric Lightning in the 1960s. In 1957, the runway was extended to its current length of 7,516ft (2,291m). The RAF station was closed in 1964 and the airfield sold to the Ministry of Civil Aviation.

=== Tees-Side Airport ===
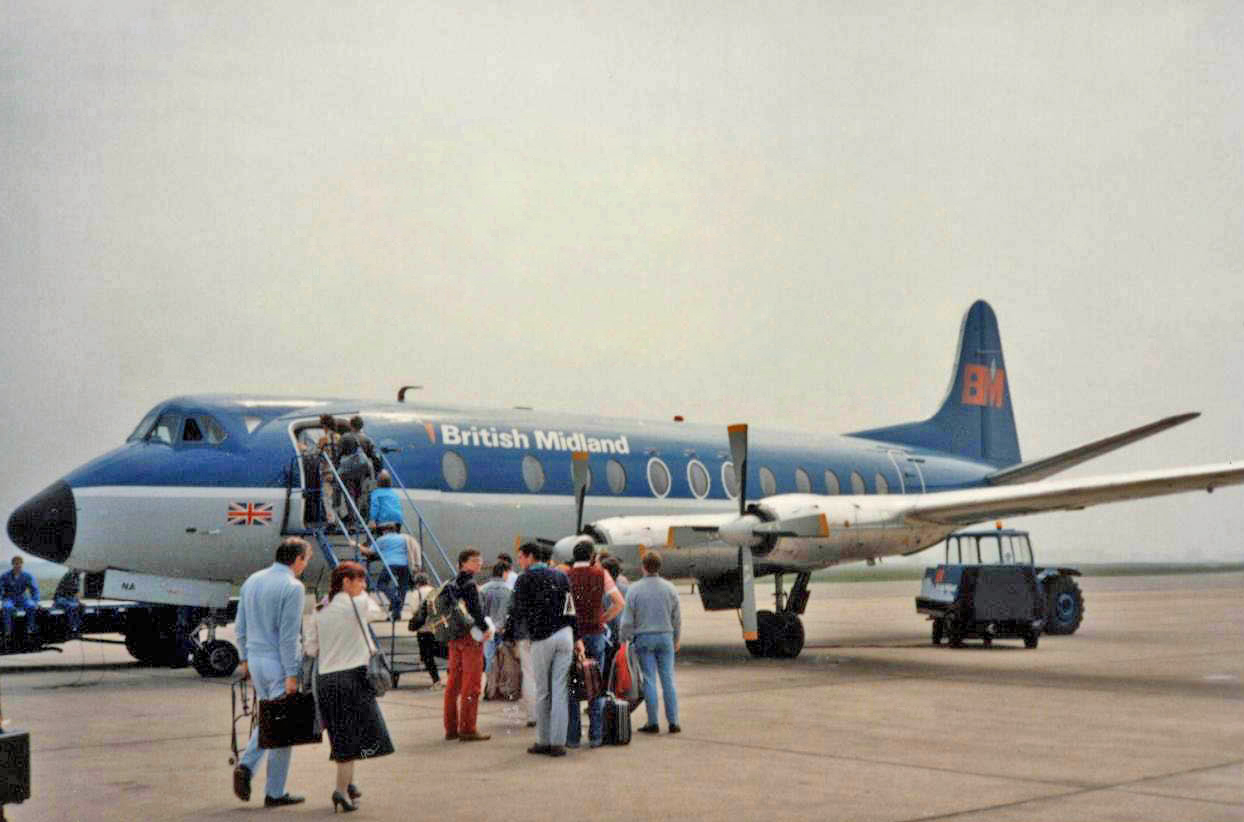
Passengers boarding a British Midland Viscount 813 in 1987

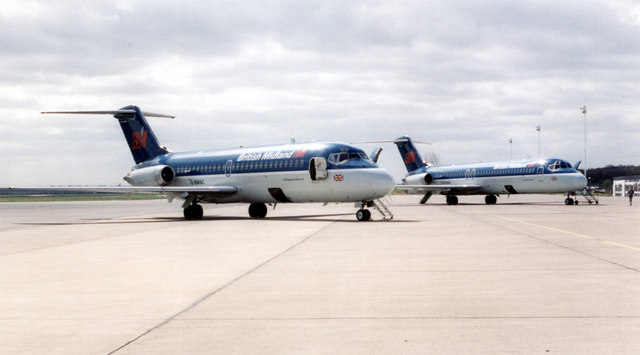
British Midland Douglas DC-9s at the airport in 1994

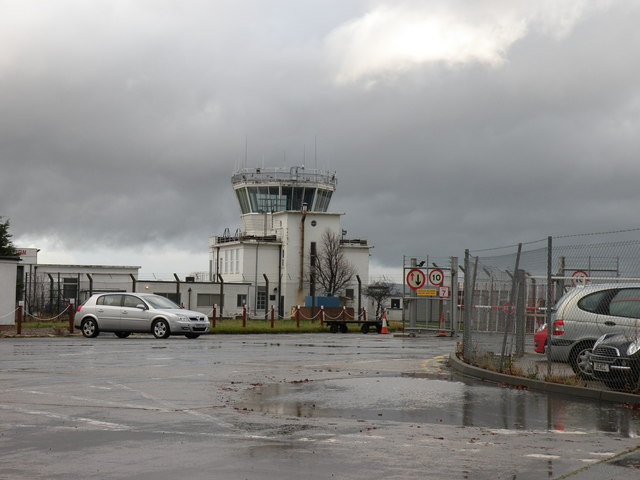
Control tower

The former RAF Station was then developed into a civil airport. The first civilian flight from the newly named Tees-Side Airport took place on 18 April 1964 with a Mercury Airlines service to Manchester. On 1 November 1966, the international passenger terminal was opened by Princess Margaretha of Sweden.

In the early days, the airport developed a network of mainly scheduled routes, with limited inclusive tour charter flights. The destinations were consistent but the airlines were not, with British Midland, BKS Air Transport, Dan-Air, Autair and Channel Airways all coming and going before the turn of the decade. In November 1969 British Midland returned when they were awarded the licence to fly the London Heathrow route, which they continued operating until 28 March 2009.

The 1970s saw a decline in regional services but a growth in holiday flights, courtesy of Northeast Airlines (a rebranded BKS Air Transport) and Britannia Airways, as well as overseas operators such as Aviaco, Spantax and Aviogenex amongst others.

On 19 October 1971, Teesside Airport railway station opened, with a shuttle bus running between the station and the terminal.

During 1974, the CAA declared Tees-Side should be the primary airport for the North East of England, this never materialized however.

The 1980s saw scheduled routes resurge thanks to home-grown airline Casair Aviation Services, who had started out as an air taxi operator in 1972. In October 1982, Casair merged their scheduled services (but kept their air taxi operation) with Genair of Liverpool and Eastern Airways of Humberside (predecessor to the airline of the same name operating today) under the Genair name, and one month later the first UK regional feeder franchise network was launched via a partnership with British Caledonian, trading under the British Caledonian Commuter Services banner. However, the new venture only lasted until July 1984 when Genair collapsed, causing the loss of 11 out of 18 routes for Tees-Side Airport. Casair stepped back in, taking over Genair services to Glasgow and Humberside, which they operated initially on behalf of Air Ecosse and then independently.

On 11 December 1982, the airport chartered Concorde for the day, it would visit twice more before its retirement, on 23 August 1986 for the air show and 30 April 1995.

=== Teesside International (1987–2004) ===
In 1987, the airport was privatised, with Cleveland and Durham local authorities retaining their shares. As part of this process the airport re-branded from Tees-Side Airport to Teesside International Airport.

One millionth aircraft movements at the airport was achieved in 1990, in the form of a British Midland service to London Heathrow. In 1996 when Cleveland County Council was abolished, the airport ownership was divided amongst local Borough Councils. Passenger numbers grew steadily from 1993 based upon an expanding holiday charter business.

In 1994, Airtours arrived on the scene and from 1997 based a summer seasonal aircraft at the airport, this coupled with other tour operator expansion propelled the airport to new heights.

In 2002, the airport sought a strategic partner to assist with future development and Peel Airports Ltd was selected as the preferred company, taking a 75% stake in the airport, with a clause to increase to 89% after 10 years, and a commitment to invest £20 million over the first five years.

Peel brought Teesside into the low cost era by securing bmibaby who based initially one, later two aircraft at the airport, ultimately giving the airport its peak years.

=== Durham Tees Valley (2004–2019) ===
On 21 September 2004, the airport was renamed Durham Tees Valley Airport at the request of bmibaby, who felt the new name placed the airport better geographically as many of the airport's passengers, particularly those from outside the UK, were unfamiliar with the location of Teesside, whilst Durham was better known. The move was widely condemned by the local population who felt passionately about the name Teesside, and considered the term Tees Valley to be geographically inaccurate, as there is no such valley.

Shortly afterwards, a new access road, terminal front and terminal interior were completed. The remainder of a planned £56 million expansion and development programme would have enabled the airport to handle up to 3 million passengers annually. However the plan never materialized due to falling passenger numbers after 2006.

In late summer 2006, bmibaby announced their surprise departure from Durham Tees Valley Airport. Peel were quick to replace them with Flyglobespan who opened an initial two-aircraft base.

Passenger numbers peaked in 2006 when the airport was used by 917,963 passengers. However, since the 2008 financial crisis, numbers declined to 130,911 in 2017 before starting to rise again in 2018. A side effect of the crisis saw a number of airline bankruptcies or mergers, greatly reducing the number of potential operators for the airport to pursue. Those that merged consolidated at the larger regional airports, leading to the likes of Newcastle and Leeds expanding, whilst local airports such as Durham Tees Valley continued to struggle for several years.

In 2010, Vancouver Airport Services purchased a controlling 65% stake in Peel Airports and in December 2011, placed the airport up for sale. This led to the Peel Group purchasing their 75% share back on 10 February 2012 under a new subsidiary, Peel Investments (DTVA) Ltd.

In November 2010, the airport introduced a passenger facility fee of £6 per adult to curb the airport's losses. Passengers had to purchase a ticket from a machine before being allowed to proceed through security. Similar schemes were at the time already in place at other small English airports including Blackpool, Newquay and Norwich. Passenger numbers during 2011 were 15% lower compared to 2010.

On 11 January 2011, Ryanair left the airport after ending their service to Alicante, having previously served Dublin, Girona and Rome Ciampino. They decided to leave the airport before the introduction of the passenger facility fee, being notoriously against such charges.

Other developments included new airfield lighting installed and during 2012, six-figure sums spent revamping the terminal building and renovating one of the World War II-era hangars.

On 30 October 2013, after it became clear the market wasn't going to yield any further leisure services, the airport announced it would no longer accept such flights as part of cost-cutting plans that would see the airport diversify into a business airport. The airport stated it would instead focus on scheduled routes and non-passenger related aviation such as cargo/general aviation. The news was part of the "Master Plan to 2020 and Beyond" covering the period up to 2050, including residential and commercial development, released in November 2013. Peel would later reverse the charter flights decision with the return of Balkan Holidays to Burgas for summer 2019, with further large scale expansion from two major holiday companies lined up, but stopped because of the 2018 takeover. Whilst controversial and unheard of at the time, it is now generally accepted that leisure flights only benefit airports when critical mass can be achieved.

The cornerstone of the master plan was a housing estate which would have raised up to £30 million to be reinvested back into the airport under a 'Section 106' agreement. This resulted in heavy opposition from the local public who misinterpreted the plans as being at the expense of the airport, but the houses were located on land too far removed from the existing airport infrastructure to be used for aviation development, and outline planning permission was received on 29 March 2017.

On 18 May 2017, Durham Tees Valley Airport announced significant investment to the airport's terminal facilities. Alongside extensive renovations in the departures area, improved retail services were introduced under the new in-house 'Xpress' brand. The first phase of investment was completed in September 2017, with the second phase starting in Autumn 2017. The airport's Privilege Membership Club also faced improvements for passenger service upgrades.

Later in May 2017, Durham Tees Valley Airport introduced a new in-house fixed-base operator (FBO), Consort Aviation.

During November 2017, the airport launched its Flying For The Future campaign to try to build support towards the airport and encourage more people to use the facility.

==== 2018 takeover ====
On 4 December 2018, Mayor of the Tees Valley, Ben Houchen, announced a £40 million deal had been agreed to buy Peel Airport's 89% majority shareholding in Durham Tees Valley Airport (made up of £35 million for the airport and £5 million for land with planning permission for 350 houses) which if approved would bring the airport back into public ownership for the first time since it was sold to Peel in 2003. Purchasing the airport was Houchen's primary election pledge in his campaign in the 2017 Tees Valley mayoral election. The deal would be completed subject to ratification from the leaders of the five local authorities that made up the Tees Valley Combined Authority (TVCA) who were to vote on the deal in January 2019 at a purpose emergency TVCA meeting called by the mayor. Stobart Aviation had been lined up to run the facility.

Under the mayor's plan to buy back the airport, Houchen said he planned to give local residents the opportunity to decide whether to change the airport's name back to Teesside International Airport. An online poll was conducted in December 2018 and of the 14,000 people who took part, 93% voted for the name to revert to Teesside International.

On 24 January 2019, the six TVCA leaders unanimously voted in favour of the plan, bringing the airport back under public ownership after 16 years in the private sector.

On 14 March 2019, the mayor held a press conference at the airport confirming Stobart Aviation as the new airport operator. Stobart would invest in a 25% stake in the new holding company with the TVCA owning the majority 75% (it was expected that prior to this the individual local authority shares would be transferred across to the TVCA).

The takeover came at a time the airport was back on the rise, the 2017 terminal refurbishment was fuelling growth in passenger numbers, Peel had invested in a new £3.5 million radar system which went live in 2021, and they had "one of the largest increases in flights at the airport since the financial crash in 2007" lined up from "two major holiday companies", which the mayor blocked in favour of using the start-up subsidies on solicitors and consults for the takeover instead.

=== Teesside International (2019–present) ===
On 25 July 2019, the airport was renamed Teesside International Airport, the name it operated under between 1987 and 2004.

In January 2020, flights to multiple destinations were announced by Eastern Airways to Belfast City, Cardiff, Dublin, Isle of Man, London City and Southampton, including a relaunch of their long established Aberdeen route. Routes to Newquay, Alicante and London Heathrow were later added, the latter for the first time in over a decade. By November, these routes were suspended due to the COVID-19 pandemic. A major global aircraft maintenance firm, Willis Lease Finance Corporation, were announced as a new tenant on 15 May 2020. They announced a £25m investment in the airport including two new hangars and a new Jet Centre facility on 18 July 2022. On 27 October 2020, TUI announced their return after nine years with a summer service to Palma de Mallorca starting in May 2022. On 10 November 2020, Loganair announced flights to five destinations, all in competition with Eastern Airways, however Eastern never reinstated several of their routes following the pandemic leaving Loganair as the sole operator on most of them. On 25 November, Ryanair announced two flights a week to Palma de Mallorca and Alicante from June 2021. On 16 December 2020, another terminal refurbishment was announced including a second lounge, cafe and bar facilities, both landside and airside, as well as opening up previously closed areas.

In the 3 March 2021 annual government budget announcement, the Tees Valley region was awarded Freeport status as well as Treasury North at Darlington (plus other departments announced since). Both expect to have long term benefits for the airport which is included as part of the freeport. On 23 April 2021, It was announced that the £6.00 passenger facility fee would be scrapped. On 12 May 2021, it was announced that duty-free shopping would return to the airport after an eight-year absence courtesy of World Duty-Free.

In 2021, TVCA announced a move from Cavendish House on Teesdale, Stockton-on-Tees to a new 1,360 m^{2} (14,600 sq ft) base at the Teesside Airport site. The move completed in 2022.

On 7 February 2022, new details of a proposed Teesside Airport Business Park were announced. A new business park, based on the south side of the airport, will include a new 1.5 km (0.93 miles) link road running direct to the A67. The existing north side industrial complex was also incorporated under the Teesside Airport Business Park banner.

On 29 August 2022, the airport officially opened a new £2.5 million cargo handling facility. The facility includes a refurbished 21,000 sq ft (2,000 m^{2}) hangar with security screening technology, handling, freight-forwarding, customs clearage and storage. The facility can also be used for specialised charter flights for both air and road freight. Private and recreational aircraft owners were evicted from their hangar to accommodate this facility, some have moved out elsewhere, whilst some remain parked outside without shelter following the airport reneging on promised replacement hangarage.

Teesside was the first airport in the UK to scrap the 100 ml limit on liquids in hand luggage with the installation of new scanning equipment known as a C3 Scanner.

In October 2024, aircraft painting specialists Airbourne Colours moved into a brand new hangar at the airport, with a second under construction. They work in close partnership with Willis Aviation Services.

In October 2025, the collapse of Eastern Airways led to their Aberdeen route ceasing operations from the Airport.

In November 2025, KLM announced the scrapping of one of their daily flights to Amsterdam Schiphol from summer 2026, leaving just two daily flights to the international hub.

In 2026, Mavi Gök Airlines announced a new weekly summer route between Teesside Airport and Antalya, Turkey, scheduled to launch on 1 July. However, the airline cancelled the route before flights commenced, citing rising fuel and operational costs linked to international events. Following TUI's earlier decision to cut its own summer service to Dalaman, the cancellation of the Antalya route left Teesside Airport with no direct flights to Turkey for the season.

In March 2026, Teesside International Airport announced a partnership with European Cargo to establish a new freight base at the Teesside Airport Business Park. The agreement involved five weekly flights carrying up to 375 tonnes of cargo to China. The deal collapsed just months later, on 3 June 2026, when the airline entered administration due to rising fuel costs and reduced flying activity. This resulted in the cancellation of the proposed base, halting operations and leading to the loss of 178 jobs across the airline including the 50 anticipated roles at Teesside.

== Airlines and destinations ==
=== Passenger ===
The following airlines operate regular scheduled passenger and cargo flights to and from Teesside International Airport:

Airlines	Destinations
Aurigny	Seasonal Charter: Guernsey, Jersey
KLM	Amsterdam
Ryanair	Alicante, Málaga; Seasonal: Corfu, Faro, Palma de Mallorca
TUI Airways	Seasonal: Palma de Mallorca

=== Cargo ===
Airlines	Destinations
FedEx Express	Edinburgh, Paris–Charles de Gaulle

== Other users ==
Three multinational defence contractors are based on site. Draken Europe provide electronic countermeasure and aggressor training to the MoD using a fleet of Dassault Falcon 20 and Aero L-159E ALCA aircraft, and built a new hangar in 2022 to accommodate the latter. Serco operate their International Fire Training Centre, one of the largest in Europe, on the airport's south side. Thales' calibration and flight inspection subsidiary is based at Teesside; it operates a Beechcraft Super King Air and Diamond DA42 Twin Star.

US firm Willis Lease Finance Corporation subsidiary Willis Aviation Services operate out of Hangar 2 at the airport and carry out maintenance, recycling and storage of a wide variety of commercial aircraft. Jet Centre by Willis now run the airport FBO.

FedEx Express have operated a road freight network from Hangar 1 for a number of years, having taken over the previously incumbent TNT Express. In 2024 they expanded into air freight operating out of Hangar 3.

Aircraft painting specialists Airbourne Colours opened a brand new facility (Hangar 4) in October 2024.

== Traffic statistics ==
=== Passengers and aircraft movements ===
The airport saw strong growth from 1993 to 2006, when passenger numbers peaked at 917,963. Passenger numbers then declined steeply in the subsequent four years due to the 2008 financial crisis. Passenger numbers continued to fall before stabilizing in 2018 prior to the 2019 Covid pandemic that led to the almost complete shutdown of passenger air travel through most of 2020. Passenger numbers have since started to rise steadily in the years following Covid with new holiday destinations subsequently being introduced. Combined with the "core" business flights currently operating out of the airport, the owner's long-term hope is of pushing passenger numbers beyond 1.4m in the next decade by attracting a low cost airline.

Freight volumes decreased at the airport from 2000 onwards, to effectively zero tonnage by 2010. Freight volumes began to increase at the airport in 2023 as a result of a new cargo handling facility opening. In June 2024, freight handler FedEx Express began operating flights in and out of the airport, boosting the volume of freight handled at the airport.

Teesside International Airport passenger totals 2000–2025 (thousands)

Traffic statistics at Teesside International Airport
Year	Passengers (Note: The number of domestic and international passengers handled)		Aircraft (Note: The number of all aircraft takeoffs and landings at the airport)		Freight	
Year	Numbers	% change	Numbers	% change	Tonnes	% change
2000	746,983	Steady	54,625	Steady	3,145	Steady
2001	733,617	▼1.7	58,494	▲7.0	2,076	▼33.9
2002	671,131	▼8.5	52,276	▼10.6	1,016	▼51.0
2003	704,269	▲4.9	51,976	▼0.5	1,092	▲7.4
2004	788,382	▲11.9	49,529	▼4.7	484	▼55.6
2005	900,035	▲14.1	51,714	▲4.4	363	▼25.0
2006	917,963	▲1.9	55,788	▲7.8	459	▲26.4
2007	743,727	▼18.9	57,515	▲3.0	790	▲72.1
2008	654,192	▼12.0	45,310	▼21.2	290	▼63.2
2009	289,464	▼55.7	25,208	▼44.3	356	▲22.8
2010	224,673	▼22.3	20,756	▼17.6	0	▼100.0
2011	192,410	▼14.3	20,879	▲0.5	3	▲ nm
2012	166,251	▼13.5	17,938	▼14.0	0	▼100.0
2013	161,092	▼3.1	18,298	▲2.0	0	Steady
2014	142,379	▼10.3	17,940	▼1.9	2	▲ nm
2015	140,902	▼1.0	18,702	▲4.2	0	▼100.0
2016	132,369	▼6.1	21,162	▲13.2	8	▲ nm
2017	130,911	▼1.1	19,668	▼7.1	4	▼50.0
2018	142,080	▲8.5	16,950	▼13.8	1	▼75.0
2019	150,735	▲6.1	16,746	▼1.2	0	▼100.0
2020	38,540	▼74.4	12,731	▼24.0	8	▲ nm
2021	78,520	▲103.7	18,013	▲41.5	0	▼100.0
2022	173,785	▲121.3	20,319	▲12.8	0	Steady
2023	226,557	▲30.4	21,125	▲4.0	62	▲ nm
2024	228,126	▲0.7	18,971	▼10.2	450	▲625.8
2025	261,440	▲14.6	20,822	▲9.8	1,909	▲324.2

=== Routes ===
Busiest routes to and from Teesside (2025)
Rank	Airport	Total passengers	Change 2024 / 25
1	Amsterdam	107,315	▲8.0%
2	Alicante	49,220	▲22.7%
3	Palma de Mallorca	36,925	▲0.6%
4	Málaga	24,689	▲ new route
5	Faro	20,344	▲1.5%
6	Aberdeen	7,001	▼25.0%
7	Corfu	6,768	▼5.1%
8	Dalaman	3,329	▼24.8%
9	Jersey	2,072	▼13.0%
10	Lourdes	756	▲6.2%

== Ground transport ==
=== Bus ===
Stagecoach North East operates a bus service (No.6/6A) that runs from Stockton-on-Tees and Darlington to the airport hourly.

=== Car ===
The airport is situated off the A67 and is near the A1(M), A19 and A66 corridors. A significant upgrade to complete a fast link direct to the airport from the A66 was completed in 2008.

=== Rail ===
Currently, Dinsdale railway station, about 2 miles (3.2km) away in the nearby village of Middleton St George, is the closest station with regular passenger services, as well as a direct bus link with the terminal.

As of April 2022, Teesside Airport railway station is closed. The station has always been sparsely served, receiving two trains per week until December 2017 when the service was reduced to just one train every Sunday. The airport is exploring the possibility of using more shuttle buses and "horizontal escalators" to boost patronage at a new station in the future.

=== Taxi ===
Taxis are available directly outside the airport terminal.
