= Teesside Airport railway station =

Railway station in County Durham, England

Teesside Airport
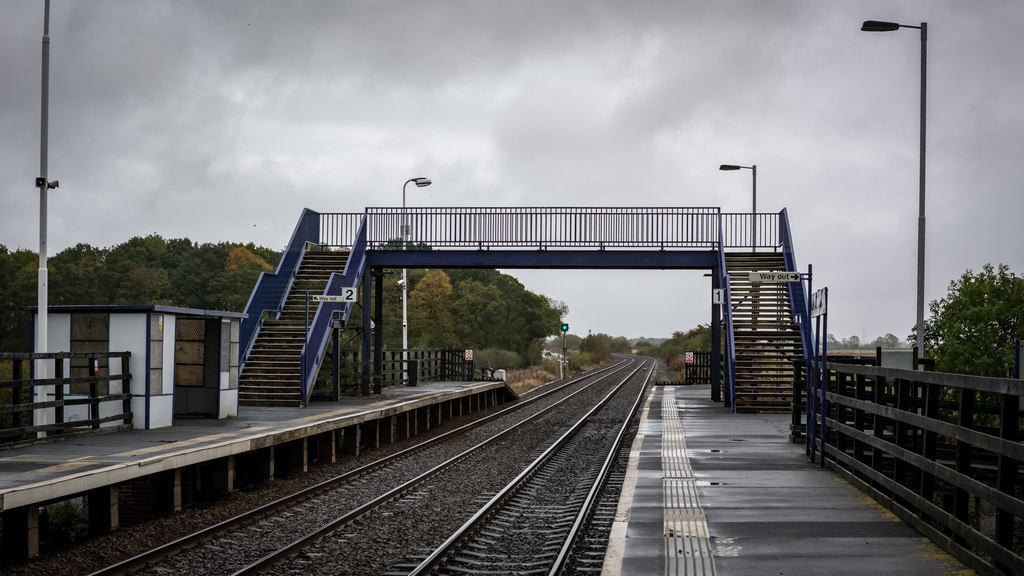

General information
- Location: Teesside International Airport, Middleton St George; England
- Coordinates: 54°31′07″N 1°25′31″W
- Grid reference: NZ373138
- Owner: Teesside International Airport
- Manager: Northern Trains
- Platforms: 1 (not in use)
- Tracks: 2

Other information
- Station code: TEA
- Classification: DfT category F1

History
- Original company: British Rail (Eastern Region)

Key dates
- 3 October 1971: Opened
- May 2022: Service Suspended

Passengers
- 2021/22: ▲42
- 2022/23: ▼2
- 2023/24: ▼0 (Note: Service suspended since May 2022.)
- 2024/25: 0
- 2025/26: 0
Location
- Location within County Durham
Notes
- Passenger statistics from the Office of Rail and Road

Teesside Airport railway station is on the Tees Valley line which runs between Bishop Auckland and Saltburn via Darlington in County Durham, England. The station is 5 miles 43 chains (8.9 km) east of Darlington, and about 1 mile (1.6 km) from Teesside International Airport, which owns the station. It is managed by Northern Trains, which also operated the limited service calling at the station prior to services being suspended in 2022.

Teesside Airport is one of Britain's least-used railway stations, with an estimated 338 passenger journeys made during 2019/20. While remaining officially open, the station has seen its service suspended since May 2022 with the one operational platform condemned as unsafe. Because of this, there were only 2 passengers in the year beginning April 2022, and 0 in the years thereafter.

== History ==
The station is on the original route of the Stockton & Darlington Railway. Funded by the Teesside Airport Joint Committee, it was opened by British Rail on 3 October 1971. The station is a fifteen-minute walk from the airport terminal, and accessibility issues are a major factor in its lack of usage.

In 2004, the airport changed its name to Durham Tees Valley Airport, but reverted to Teesside International Airport in 2019. The station's name was never updated to reflect the change. In 2007, Northern Rail erected new signs reading Teesside Airport, replacing previous signs which had used a hyphen in Tees-side. National Rail now also lists the station as Teesside Airport.

On 24 October 2009, a group of 26 people travelled to and from the station on the only scheduled service, to highlight the station's existence and its limited service, and to try to persuade railway authorities to move it closer to the airport terminal.

The station saw its service suspended in May 2022, being deemed unsafe with owner Teesside International Airport refusing to fund repairs.

=== Tees Valley Metro and Redevelopment ===
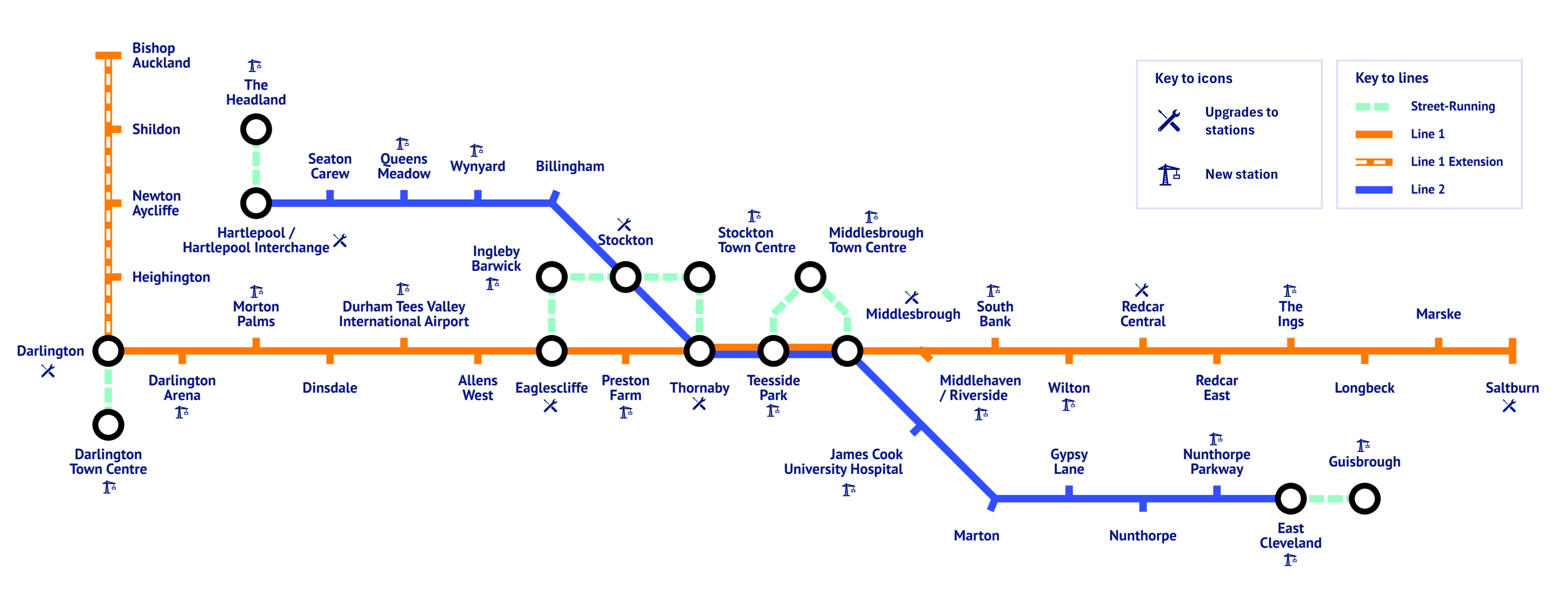
Diagram showcasing all discussed or mentioned ideas for the Tees Valley Metro.

Starting in 2006, Teesside Airport was mentioned within the Tees Valley Metro scheme. This was a plan to upgrade the Tees Valley Line and sections of the Esk Valley Line and Durham Coast Line to provide a faster and more frequent service across the North East of England. In the initial phases the services would have been heavy rail mostly along existing alignments with new additional infrastructure and rollingstock. The later phase would have introduced tram-trains to allow street running and further heavy rail extensions.

As part of the scheme, Teesside Airport station would have been relocated to better serve the terminal. The new station would have been near the road bridge that connects the Airport link road to the A67 as well as a planned new hotel development. A platform in each direction would have been provided, along with stairs and ramps to the road bridge. A new waiting area was also discussed, potentially with electronic information screens displaying rail and air departure information. The station would have been linked to the terminal via a separate footpath, with bus connections also located at the terminal. The station would have received improved service to Darlington and Saltburn (1–2 to 4 trains per hour) and new rollingstock.

However, due to a change in government in 2010 and the 2008 financial crisis, the project was ultimately shelved. Several stations eventually got their improvements and there is a possibility of improved rollingstock and services in the future which may affect Teesside Airport.

Early in 2024, the Tees Valley Combined Authority Mayor, Ben Houchen, expressed a desire to spend £20 million on a new station. The money was made available following the cancellation of HS2. Tees Valley also commented, stating that they were working on repairing the platform and getting weekly services up and running again.

There are plans to re-introduce services to Teesside Airport in 2027, however many residents have mixed opinions stating that the station itself is useless, once again citing low usage.

== Facilities ==
The station has one platform for Darlington-bound trains, with very basic amenities. There is step-free access to the platform. The station has two platforms, each long enough for a four-carriage train. In December 2017, it was announced by Durham Tees Valley Airport that the station's footbridge and Middlesbrough-bound platform would be closed, in order to save a quoted total of £6 million on maintenance of the station up until 2022.

== Passenger volume ==
From the start of recording least-used stations in 1997, Teesside Airport has been named the least used station in Great Britain several times and the most of any station. In 2020/21, due to decreased travel throughout the COVID-19 pandemic, the station saw only two passenger journeys made, matching the result of the 2022/23 period.

In the BBC Radio 4 programme The Ghost Trains of Old England, in October 2010, it was suggested that a large proportion of the tickets sold for the station are bought by collectors who wish to own tickets with rare or unusual destinations, and do not necessarily travel. In May 2016, a group of 28 enthusiasts visited the station, increasing the annual figures by 56.

Passenger volume at Teesside Airport
	2004–05	2005–06	2006–07	2007–08	2008–09	2009–10	2010–11	2011–12	2012–13	2013–14	2014–15	2015–16	2016–17	2017–18	2018–19	2019–20	2020–21	2021–22	2022–23
Entries and exits	74	72	85	52	44	68	18	14	8	8	32	98	30	74	206	338	2	42	2

The statistics cover twelve month periods that start in April.

== Services ==
Since the May 2021 timetable change, the station was served by a once-weekly westbound service on a Sunday, between Hartlepool and Darlington. Services were operated by Northern Trains in this period.

The May 2026 timetable change from Northern still shows Teesside Airport, but shows no departures, attributing to the 2022 suspension.

From the early 1990s, the station has received only a bare minimum parliamentary service, to avoid the need for formal closure proceedings.

Preceding station	National Rail	Following station
Allens West	Northern Trains; Tees Valley Line	Dinsdale

== Bibliography ==
- Caton, Peter (2018). Remote Stations. Leicestershire: Matador. ISBN 978-1-78901-408-2.
