= Dinsdale railway station =

Railway station in County Durham, England

Dinsdale
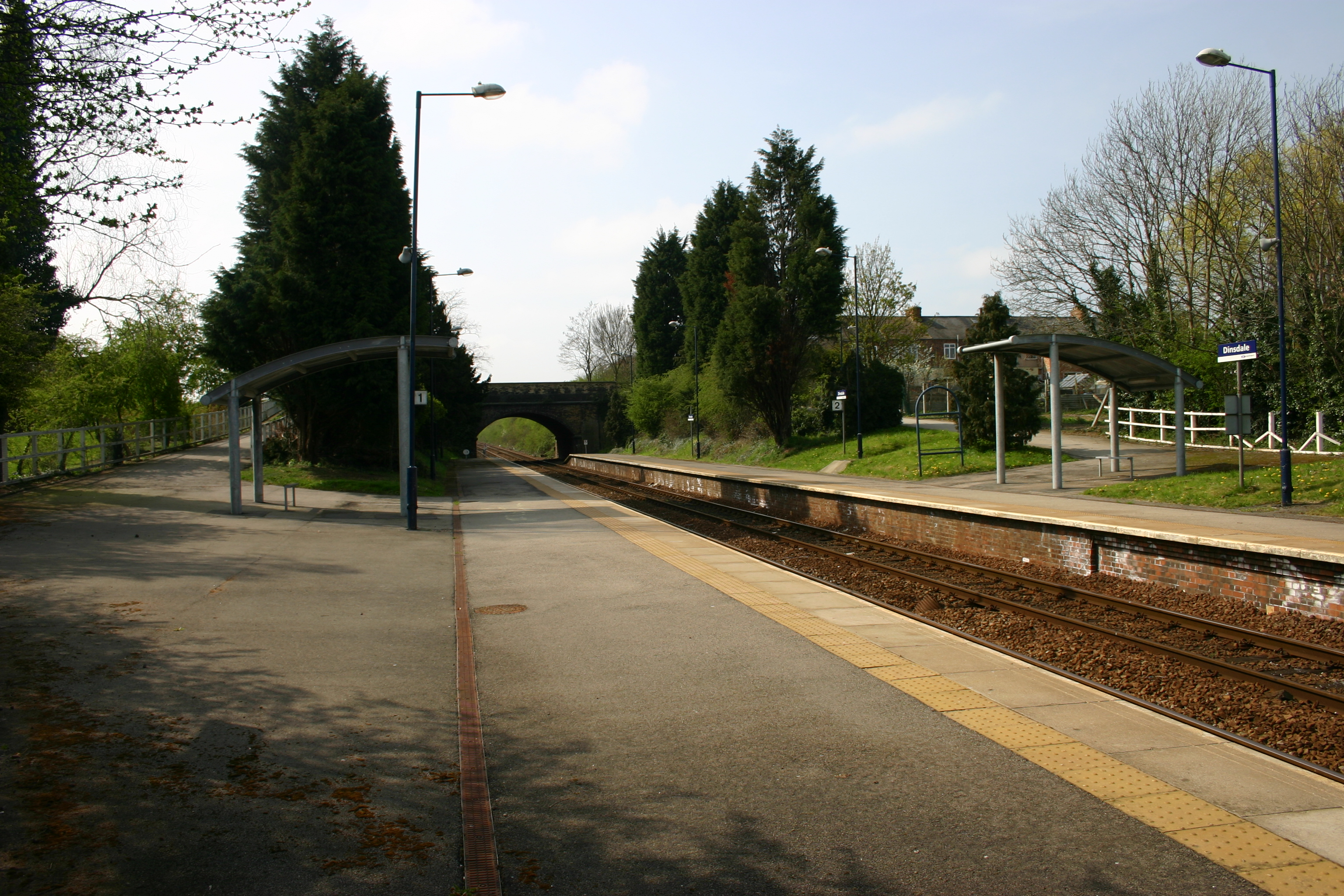

General information
- Location: Middleton St George, Borough of Darlington; England
- Coordinates: 54°30′54″N 1°28′02″W
- Grid reference: NZ346134
- Owner: Network Rail
- Manager: Northern Trains
- Platforms: 2
- Tracks: 2

Other information
- Station code: DND
- Classification: DfT category F2

History
- Original company: North Eastern Railway
- Pre-grouping: North Eastern Railway
- Post-grouping: London and North Eastern Railway; British Rail (Eastern Region)

Key dates
- 1 July 1887: Opened

Passengers
- 2021/22: ▲61,346
- 2022/23: ▲69,470
- 2023/24: ▲80,970
- 2024/25: ▲88,380
- 2025/26: ▲0.105 million
Location
- Location within County Durham
Notes
- Passenger statistics from the Office of Rail and Road

Dinsdale is a railway station on the Tees Valley Line, which runs between Bishop Auckland and Saltburn via Darlington. The station, situated 3 miles 65 chains (6.1 km) east of Darlington, serves the village of Middleton St George, Darlington in County Durham, England. It is owned by Network Rail and managed by Northern Trains.

== History ==
The station was opened by the North Eastern Railway on 1 July 1887. It is closely linked with the history of the Stockton and Darlington Railway, having opened as a replacement for the nearby Fighting Cocks.

The station was named after the village of Low Dinsdale, Borough of Darlington, which is commonly referred to as Dinsdale. In the early nineteenth century, the station served Dinsdale Spa.

=== Tees Valley Metro ===
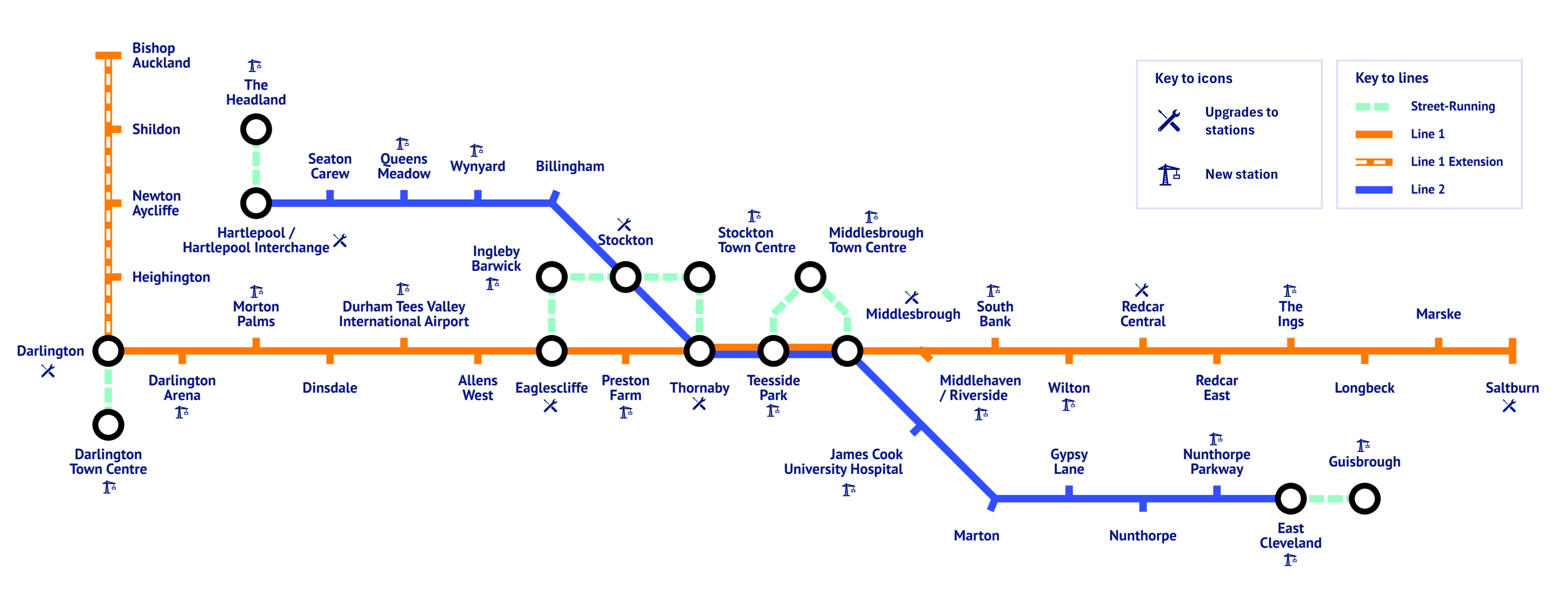
Transit diagram showcasing all discussed or mentioned ideas for the Tees Valley Metro.

Starting in 2006, Dinsdale was mentioned within the Tees Valley Metro scheme. This was a plan to upgrade the Tees Valley Line and sections of the Esk Valley Line and Durham Coast Line to provide a faster and more frequent service across the North East of England. In the initial phases the services would have been heavy rail mostly along existing alignments with new additional infrastructure and rollingstock. The later phase would have introduced tram-trains to allow street running and further heavy rail extensions.

As part of the scheme, Dinsdale station would have received improved service to Darlington and Saltburn (1–2 to 4 trains per hour) and new rollingstock.

However, due to a change in government in 2010 and the 2008 financial crisis, the project was ultimately shelved. Several stations eventually got their improvements and there is a possibility of improved rollingstock and services in the future which may affect Dinsdale.

== Facilities ==
A number of station improvements took place in the mid–2010s, including the installation of new CCTV cameras, new shelters, seating, passenger information screens and announcements, resurfaced platform areas and clearer signage at the station entrance.

== Services ==
As of the May 2021 timetable change, the station is served by two trains per hour between Saltburn and Darlington via Middlesbrough, with one train per hour extending to Bishop Auckland. An hourly service operates between Saltburn and Bishop Auckland on Sunday. All services are operated by Northern Trains.

Rolling stock used: Class 156 Super Sprinter and Class 158 Express Sprinter

Preceding station	National Rail	Following station
Allens West	Northern Trains; Tees Valley Line	Darlington
Teesside Airport (Service Suspended)	Northern Trains; Tees Valley Line	Darlington
