= Allens West railway station =

Railway station in County Durham, England

Allens West
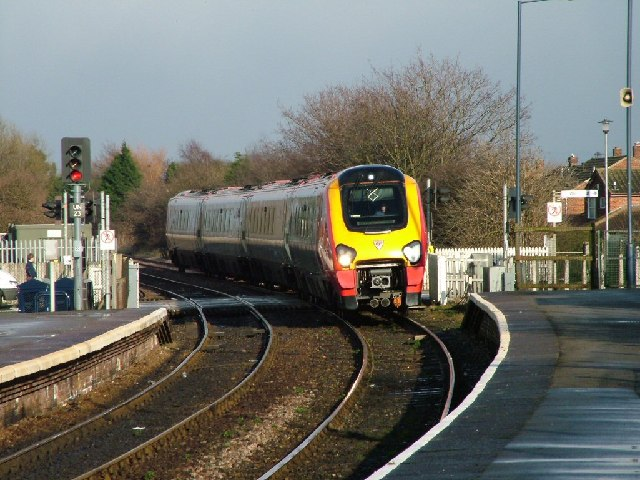

General information
- Location: Eaglescliffe, Borough of Stockton-on-Tees; England
- Coordinates: 54°31′28″N 1°21′42″W
- Grid reference: NZ413145
- Owner: Network Rail
- Manager: Northern Trains
- Platforms: 2
- Tracks: 2

Other information
- Station code: ALW
- Classification: DfT category F2

History
- Original company: London and North Eastern Railway
- Post-grouping: London and North Eastern Railway; British Rail (North Eastern Region)

Key dates
- 4 October 1943: Opened as Urlay Nook Halt
- 22 May 1944: Renamed Allens West Halt
- 4 October 1971: Renamed Allens West

Passengers
- 2021/22: ▲58,750
- 2022/23: ▲73,166
- 2023/24: ▲85,356
- 2024/25: ▲99,646
- 2025/26: ▲0.107 million
Location
- Location within County Durham
Notes
- Passenger statistics from the Office of Rail and Road

Allens West is a railway station on the Tees Valley Line, which runs between Bishop Auckland and Saltburn via Darlington. The station, situated 8 miles 9 chains (8.11 mi; 13.1 km) east of Darlington, serves the village of Eaglescliffe, Borough of Stockton-on-Tees in County Durham, England. It is owned by Network Rail and managed by Northern Trains.

== History ==
Opened by the London and North Eastern Railway during the Second World War as an unadvertised station to serve a nearby Royal Navy stores depot. The station then passed on to the North Eastern Region of British Railways on nationalisation in 1948.

Following the construction of new housing in the area, the station became an advertised public station on 3 October 1971. When Sectorisation was introduced, the station was served by Regional Railways until the privatisation of British Rail.

In autumn 2013, the station's level crossing was upgraded by Network Rail. The half barriers were replaced with full barriers, after several reports of "near misses" with pedestrians avoiding the lowered barriers and crossing the tracks in front of approaching trains.

=== Tees Valley Metro ===
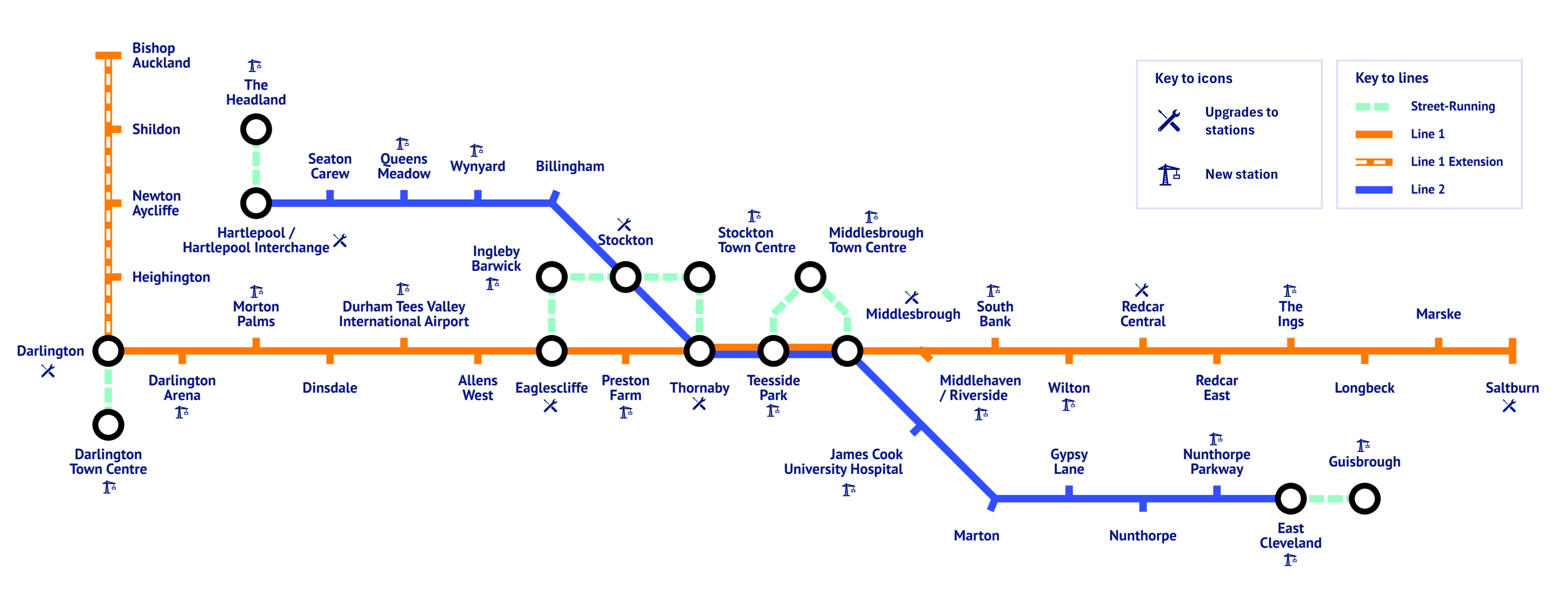
Transit diagram showcasing all discussed or mentioned ideas for the Tees Valley Metro.

Starting in 2006, Allens West was mentioned within the Tees Valley Metro scheme. This was a plan to upgrade the Tees Valley Line and sections of the Esk Valley Line and Durham Coast Line to provide a faster and more frequent service across the North East of England. In the initial phases the services would have been heavy rail mostly along existing alignments with new additional infrastructure and rolling stock. The later phase would have introduced tram-trains to allow street running and further heavy rail extensions.

As part of the scheme, Allens West station would have received improved service to Darlington and Saltburn (1–2 to 4 trains per hour) and new rollingstock.

However, due to a change in government in 2010 and the 2008 financial crisis, the project was ultimately shelved. Several stations eventually got their improvements and there is a possibility of improved rollingstock and services in the future which may affect Allens West.

== Facilities ==
The station is unstaffed and has no permanent buildings other than standard waiting shelters on each platform. Ticket machines are now available on each platform but you can still purchase a ticket on the train. Facilities here were improved in April 2013. The package for this station included new fully lit waiting shelters, renewed station signage, digital CIS displays and the installation of CCTV. The long-line Public Address system (PA) has been renewed and upgraded with pre-recorded train announcements. Train running information can be obtained via the public payphone on platform 2 and timetable posters. Step-free access is available to both platforms via the nearby level crossing.

== Services ==
As of the May 2021 timetable change, the station is served by two trains per hour between Saltburn and Darlington via Middlesbrough, with one train per hour extending to Bishop Auckland. An hourly service operates between Saltburn and Bishop Auckland on Sunday. All services are operated by Northern Trains.

Rolling stock used: Class 156 Super Sprinter and Class 158 Express Sprinter

Preceding station	National Rail	Following station
Eaglescliffe	Northern Trains; Tees Valley Line	Dinsdale
Eaglescliffe	Northern Trains; Tees Valley Line	Teesside Airport (Service Suspended)

== Sources ==
- Butt, R. V. J. (October 1995). The Directory of Railway Stations: details every public and private passenger station, halt, platform and stopping place, past and present (1st ed.). Sparkford: Patrick Stephens Ltd. ISBN 978-1-85260-508-7. OCLC 60251199. OL 11956311M.
- Jowett, Alan (2000). Jowett's Nationalised Railway Atlas (1st ed.). Penryn, Cornwall: Atlantic Transport Publishers. ISBN 978-0-906899-99-1. OCLC 228266687.
