= Lokrume helmet fragment =

Decorated fragment from a Viking Age helmet

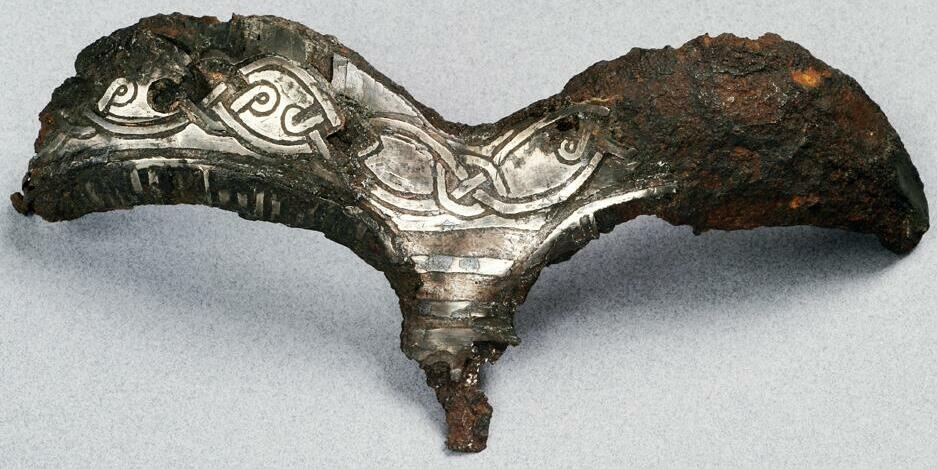
- The Lokrume helmet fragment

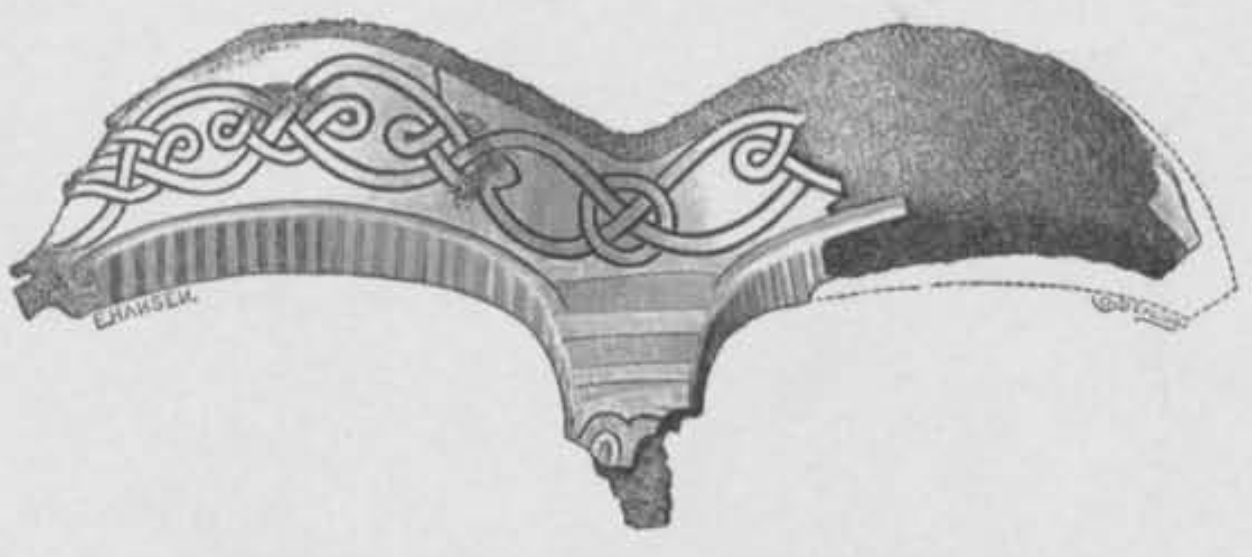
- 1907 drawing of the fragment
- Material: Iron, silver, niello
- Created: c. tenth century
- Discovered: Lokrume, Gotland, Sweden
- Present location: Gotland Museum
- Registration: GF B 1683

The Lokrume helmet fragment is a decorated eyebrow piece from a Viking Age helmet. It is made of iron, the surface of which is covered with silver and features an interlace pattern in niello or wire. Discovered in Lokrume, a small settlement on the Swedish island of Gotland, the fragment was first described in print in 1907 and is in the collection of the Gotland Museum.

The fragment is dated to around the tenth century AD, on the basis of its interlace pattern; similar designs appear on tenth-century swords. It is all that remains of one of five Viking helmets to survive in any condition; the others are the Gjermundbu helmet from Norway, the Yarm helmet from England, the Tjele helmet fragment from Denmark, and a fragment from Kyiv, Ukraine. These are all examples of the "crested helmets" that entered use in Europe around the sixth century, and derive from the earlier Anglo-Saxon and Vendel Period helmets.

== Description ==
The Lokrume fragment is the remnant of the eyebrow piece, and part of the nose guard, from a helmet. The fragment is 13.2 centimetres (5.2 in) wide. An iron core was either coated or inlaid with silver; under the former method, a grid would be cut into the iron and the silver hammered on, whereas under the latter, the silver would be filled into purpose-shaped grooves cut into the iron. The silver was then inlaid with niello or wire (possibly copper). The inlaid pattern stretches the width of the fragment, though much of the sinister portion is now lost. The pattern is patterned with intertwined bands and circles. Transverse bands further adorn the area around this pattern.

== Discovery ==
The fragment was discovered in Lokrume, a small settlement on the Swedish island of Gotland. The circumstances of its discovery are otherwise unknown. It was first described in print in the academic journal Fornvännen in 1907; the two-sentence mention, which included a drawing, stated that the piece was found in Lokrume, and held in the collection of Visby Fornsal—now known as the Gotland Museum. As of 2024 the fragment remains at the museum, where it is catalogued as GF B 1683.

== Typology ==
The reconstructed pattern from the fragment

=== Date ===
The fragment's style of interlace pattern (a variation of the drakslingor motif) dates to around the tenth century AD; similar patterns appear on tenth-century swords, including examples from Norway and one found near Lipiany in Poland. This places the fragment squarely within the Viking Age, which lasted from the end of the eighth century to the middle of the eleventh.

=== Style ===
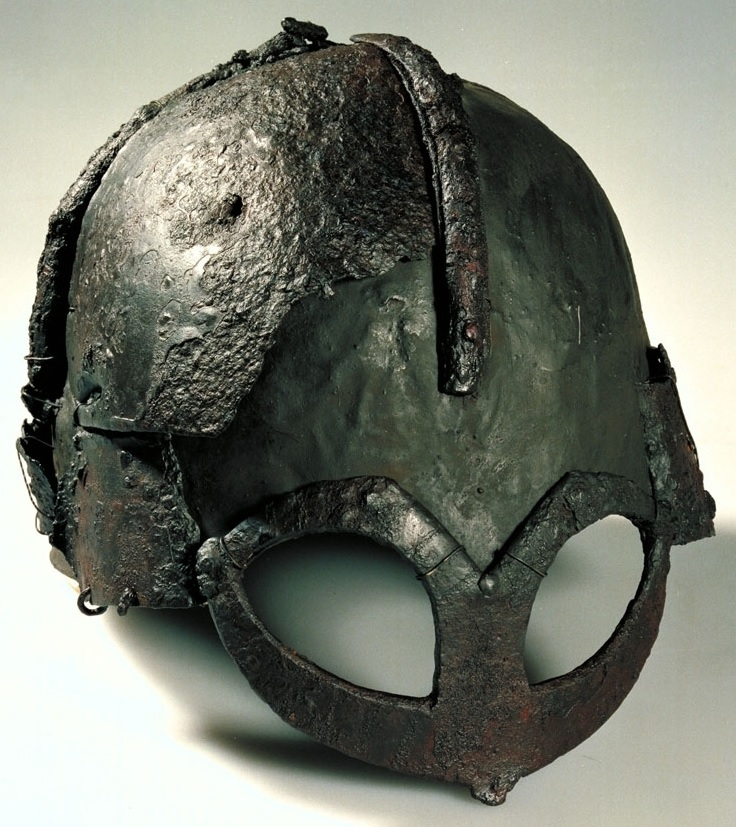
The Gjermundbu helmet

Beginning in the late sixth century, and continuing until around the tenth or eleventh, the predominant style of helmet used in Scandinavia and England was the "Nordic crested helmet"; these contrasted with the spangenhelm and lamellenhelm that typified continental wear. Crested helmets were typically constructed from a brow band, a nose-to-nape band, lateral bands from ears to apex, cheek guards, and some form of neck protection; iron plates filled the gaps, with rivets holding the pieces together. Frequent motifs included prominent brow pieces, and crests running along the nose-to-nape bands. In addition to a decorative function, the crests likely helped deflect glancing blows.

Remains of only four other Viking Age helmets (only two of which are from Scandinavia) are known: the Gjermundbu helmet from Norway and the Yarm helmet from England, as well as the Tjele helmet fragment from Denmark, and a fragment from Kyiv, Ukraine. The Lokrume piece was the first of these to be identified; the Tjele fragment was discovered in 1850, but mistaken for a saddle mounting until 1984. Like the other four, the Lokrume helmet appears to have been a descendant of the earlier Vendel Period and Anglo-Saxon helmets from Scandinavia and England, respectively, and the final iteration of the Nordic crested helmets.

== Bibliography ==
- Boye, Vilhelm (1858). "To fund af smedeværktöi fra den sidste hedenske tid i Danmark" [Two Finds of Smithing Tools from the Last Pagan Age of Denmark]. Annaler for Nordisk Oldkyndighed og Historie [Annals of Nordic Ancient Knowledge and History] (in Danish): 191–200, pl. II–IV.
- Bruce-Mitford, Rupert (1952). "The Sutton Hoo Ship-Burial". In Hodgkin, Robert Howard (ed.). A History of the Anglo-Saxons. Vol. II (3rd ed.). London: Oxford University Press. pp. 696–734, 750–756. OCLC 842978410.
- Bruce-Mitford, Rupert (1974). Aspects of Anglo-Saxon Archaeology: Sutton Hoo and Other Discoveries. London: Victor Gollancz Limited. ISBN 0-575-01704-X.
- Bruce-Mitford, Rupert (1978). The Sutton Hoo Ship-Burial, Volume 2: Arms, Armour and Regalia. London: British Museum Publications. ISBN 978-0-7141-1331-9.
- Caple, Chris (2 July 2020). "The Yarm Helmet" (PDF). Medieval Archaeology. 64: 31–64. doi:10.1080/00766097.2020.1755126. S2CID 221055800.
- Grieg, Sigurd (1947). Gjermundbufunnet: En høvdingegrav fra 900-årene fra Ringerike [The Gjermundbu Find: A Chieftain Grave from the 900s from Ringerike]. Norske Oldfunn (in Norwegian). Vol. VIII. Oslo: Bergen. OCLC 984069139.
- "Hjälm, del av" [Helmet, part of]. Gotlands Museum (in Swedish).
- Hjardar, Kim & Vike, Vegard (2011). Vikinger i krig [Vikings at War] (in Norwegian). Oslo: Spartacus Forlag AS. ISBN 978-82-430-0475-7.

- Translated as Hjardar, Kim & Vike, Vegard (2016). Vikings at War. Oxford: Casemate Publishers. ISBN 978-1-61200-403-7.

- Lindqvist, Sune (1925). "Vendelhjälmarnas ursprung" [The Origin of the Vendel Helmets] (PDF). Fornvännen [The Friend of the Past] (in Swedish). 20: 181–207. ISSN 0015-7813.
- Munksgaard, Elisabeth (1984). "A Viking Age Smith, his Tools and his Stock-in-trade". Offa. 41: 85–89. ISSN 0078-3714.
- Petersen, Jan (1919). De Norske Vikingesverd: En Typologisk-Kronologisk Studie Over Vikingetidens Vaaben. Kristiania: Jacob Dybwad.
- Steuer, Heiko (1987). "Helm und Ringschwert: Prunkbewaffnung und Rangabzeichen germanischer Krieger" [Helmet and Ring-Sword: Ornamental Weapons and Insignia of Germanic Warriors]. In Häßler, Hans-Jürgen (ed.). Studien zur Sachsenforschung [Studies in Saxon Research] (in German). Vol. 6. Hildesheim: Lax. pp. 189–236. ISBN 3-7848-1617-7.
- Thunmark-Nylén, Lena (1998). Die Wikingerzeit Gotlands: Typentafeln [The Viking Age of Gotland: Fact Sheets] (in German). Vol. II. Stockholm: Almqvist & Wiksell. ISBN 91-7402-287-3.
- Thunmark-Nylén, Lena (2000b). Die Wikingerzeit Gotlands: Katalog [The Viking Age of Gotland: Catalogue] (in German). Vol. IV:2. Stockholm: Almqvist & Wiksell. ISBN 91-7402-308-X.
- Thunmark-Nylén, Lena (2000c). Die Wikingerzeit Gotlands: Katalog [The Viking Age of Gotland: Catalogue] (in German). Vol. IV:3. Stockholm: Almqvist & Wiksell. ISBN 91-7402-309-8.
- Thunmark-Nylén, Lena (2006a). Die Wikingerzeit Gotlands: Text [The Viking Age of Gotland: Text] (in German). Vol. III:1. Stockholm: Almqvist & Wiksell. ISBN 91-7402-354-3.
- Tweddle, Dominic (1992). The Anglian Helmet from 16–22 Coppergate. The Archaeology of York. Vol. 17/8. London: Council for British Archaeology. ISBN 1-872414-19-2. Archived from the original on 21 March 2024.
- "Ur främmande samlingar: 2" [From foreign collections: 2] (PDF). Fornvännen [The Friend of the Past] (in Swedish). 2: 205–208. 1907. ISSN 0015-7813.
- Vlasatý, Tomáš (19 November 2016). "The helmet from Lokrume, Gotland". Project Forlǫg - Reenactment and Science. doi:10.59500/forlog. ISSN 2788-3000.
