= SSK 90 helmet =

World War II Luftwaffe helmet

- Type: Flight helmet
- Place of origin: Germany

Service history
- In service: May 1941
- Used by: Luftwaffe
- Wars: World War II

Production history
- Manufacturer: Siemens

The SSK 90 helmet was a short-lived World War II Luftwaffe helmet. Manufactured by Siemens, the helmet consisted of an inner core of interlocking steel plates, a goatskin exterior, and an underside with foam rubber padding and a cloth lining; a prominent protrusion at the front helped to put on and take off the helmet quickly, and served as extra padding in case of a crash. The helmet had cutouts for earphones, and was designed to be worn over a cloth flight helmet outfitted with radio gear.

The helmet was introduced on 8 May 1941, but quickly found unsuitable for service at the front; it was withdrawn from service only 18 days later, on 26 May. Some examples continued to be used, although pilots more frequently relied on modified versions of the M35 helmet.

== Design ==
The SSK 90 helmet comprised an inner steel core covered by padding and leather. On the inside, interlocking chromium-nickel steel plates, (Note: Despite the millennium separating the close of the Viking Age from World War II, an archaeological find of an SSK 90 helmet, with only the inner plates remaining, was misidentified as a Viking helmet. In 1992 the helmet was published as a Viking piece. Only the iron core remained, and it was suggested that "the helmet was worn over a leather or even mail garment". Thought to be the best preserved Viking helmet—better than the Gjermundbu helmet, for which only a quarter remains—the helmet was alternatively compared to patent diagrams of the SSK 90 in 2002, and suggested to instead be the remnants of its iron core.) 1 millimetre thick and slightly convex, overlapped at the point of attachment; the plates were intended to protect against shrapnel and small-calibre machine-gun fire. The exterior featured dark brown goatskin leather, and a large protruding section of padding intended to help quickly don and doff the helmet, and to provide extra cushioning in the event of impact. The underside was padded with foam rubber, and lined with a brown cotton mixture. Each side of the helmet, which was designed to be worn over a cloth flight helmet outfitted with radio gear, had a cut-out for earphones. A snap-on chinstrap used the same components – including buckles, leather, and snaps – found on German paratrooper helmets, although only about half of the helmets were issued with chinstraps. The helmet weighed about 1,900 g (4.2 lb).

The SSK 90 was extremely similar to another model, the LKH W, which differed only in its sloping neck guard, lack of chinstrap, and, frequently, an embroidered Luftwaffe eagle.

== History ==
The helmet was designed by Siemens, and adopted for use by the Luftwaffe on 8 May 1941. A 26 May 1941 report deemed the helmets unacceptable for service at the front, however, and they were returned to the Luftwaffe clothing office in Berlin. Instead, pilots relied on reworked M35 helmets, with bulges pressed into each side to provide space for earphones. Some helmets nonetheless continued to be used after the model was withdrawn.

== Bibliography ==
- Baer, Ludwig (1985). The History of the German Steel Helmet: 1916–1945. Translated by Dahl, K. Daniel. San Jose: R. James Bender Publishing. ISBN 0-912138-31-9.
- "ijzeren German luftwaffe helmet.SSK90/ME262". Nederlandse Munten.
- "Luftwaffe (Air Force): Fliegerstahlhelm SSK 90". German-Helmets.com. Archived from the original on 7 September 2018.
- "Luftwaffe Flight Protection Helmet SSK 90". Ratisbon's. 12 November 2017.
- Strong, Doug (12 July 2002). "Not A 10th Century Scandinavian Helmet". Talbot's Fine Accessories.
- Tweddle, Dominic (1992). The Anglian Helmet from 16–22 Coppergate. The Archaeology of York. Vol. 17/8. London: Council for British Archaeology. ISBN 1-872414-19-2. Archived from the original on 21 March 2024.
