= Gjermundbu helmet =

Viking Age helmet

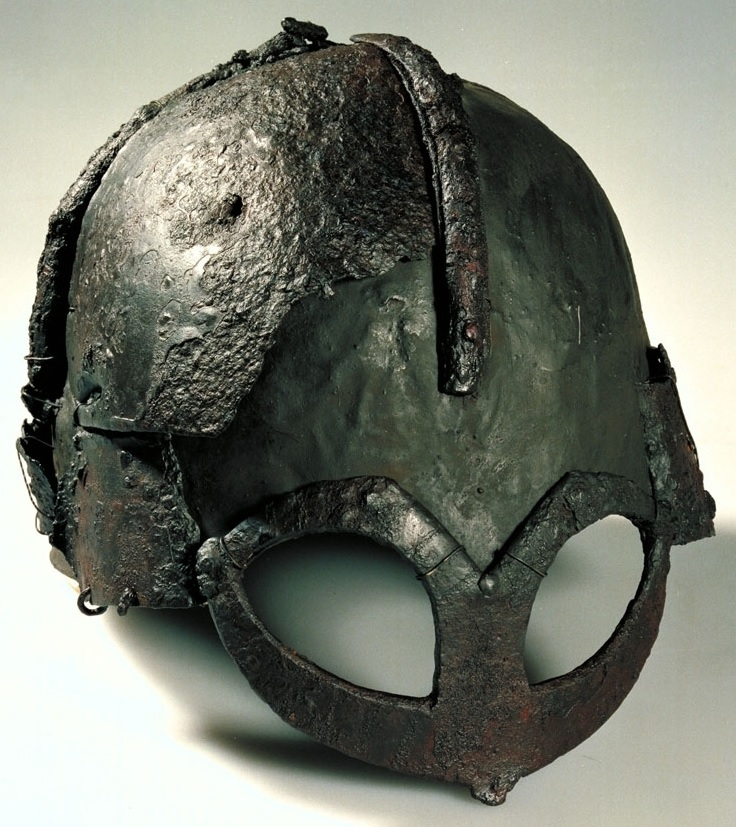
- Gjermundbu Helmet
- Material: Iron
- Created: c. 900s
- Discovered: 1943; Ringerike, Norway
- Present location: University of Oslo
- Registration: C27317 k

The Gjermundbu helmet is a Viking Age helmet.

The helmet was discovered during field clearing in 1943 at the Gjermundbu farm near Haugsbygd in the present-day Ringerike Municipality in Buskerud county, Norway. Officials at the University of Oslo were later notified. Conservator Sverre Marstrander and museum assistant Charlotte Blindheim led an investigation which confirmed the existence of a burial chamber of historic value dating from the Viking Age. The Gjermundbu finds included many artifacts, including articles of weaponry.

== The helmet ==
The Gjermundbu helmet was restored from nine excavated fragments. The helmet has a round shape, is made of iron and made of four plates. It is now on display at the Museum of Cultural History of the University of Oslo.

Together with the Tjele helmet fragment, the Yarm helmet, the Lokrume helmet fragment, and a fragment from Kyiv, it is one of only five known Viking helmets, and one of only two that could be reconstructed.

== Discovery ==
On March 29, 1943, Gunnar Gjermundbo, planning to build a home for his parents, discovered a rich burial site in Vesleenga.

Gjermundbo already knew that the site contained a large tumulus (a round Iron Age burial mound), but he had no intention of touching it. Just to the west of this burial mound was an elongated rise that he would need to level to build a house and plant a new orchard. It was when he began to dig into this embankment that artifacts began to appear. The next day, the local historian Jon Guldal informed The Collection of Norwegian antiquities at the University of Oslo about the find by telephone. The local newspaper Ringerikes Blad published the news about the find and an interview with Gjermundbo's father Lars on March 31.

Archaeologist Sverre Marstrander and museum assistant Charlotte Blindheim were sent by the university to investigate the matter. They performed additional excavations of the discovery site without any further artifacts coming to light. Marstrander was able to ascertain that it was an exceptionally rich burial, a man's grave from the Viking Age, and took the artifacts back to Oslo.

In May 1943, Gjermundbo discovered another grave in the same mound. Marstrander was again sent out and was able to ascertain that this was a separate grave from the same period as the first. The two burial are designated Gjermundbu I and II.

== Site description ==
The embankment was originally believed to be a single, approximately 25 metres (80 ft) long, 8 metres (26 ft) wide (at its widest) and up to 1.8 metres (5.9 ft) high, burial mound. It was later determined to be two different human graves (cremations) from the Viking Age. The dimensions given for the ship-shaped mound have since been adjusted to 29 metres (95 ft) long and up to 9 metres (30 ft) wide.

=== Gjermundbu I ===
This discovery was located in an elongated mound next to a tumulus, a few boulders that formed a burial chamber. A number of artifacts were found underneath the elongated mound. In terms of the quality of the grave goods, this is probably the richest man's grave from the Viking Age in Norway – after the ship graves from Gokstad in Sandefjord Municipality, Haugen farm in Rolvsøy Municipality, and the chamber grave from the same place. Helge Braathen dates the Gjermundbu grave to the latter half of the 10th century. Archaeologist Frans-Arne Stylegar has a theory that the man's grave is connected to the Vikings' ties to the Kievan Rus'.

The discovery was made in the smaller of two large mounds on the farm and included, among other things:

- Fragments of a helmet
- Fragments of chain mail
- A ceremonial sword of Jan Petersen's type S
- 2 spears
- 2 axes
- 4 shield bosses
- 2 spurs
- 5 or 6 bits

The Gjermundbu find stands alone among Viking Age grave finds in Scandinavia and Western Europe; no other finds there contain a helmet or chain mail. The helmet was found in nine fragments and has since been restored. The objects from the find are now on display at the Museum of Cultural History in Oslo. The last burial mound has not yet been excavated, but it has a stone perimeter, known as a "foot chain," which is relatively common for burial mounds from the early Iron Age.

=== Gjermundbu II ===
This find is nowhere near as rich in content as Gjermundbu I. It contained a double-edged sword of type M, a battle axe and a spear head. The find dates from the 10th century, i.e. around the same time as Gjermundbu I.

== See also ==
- Yarm helmet

== Bibliography ==
- Addyman, Peter V.; Pearson, Nicholas & Tweddle, Dominic (November 1982). "The Coppergate helmet". Antiquity. LVI (218): 189–194. doi:10.1017/S0003598X00054673. S2CID 54050677.
- Bruce-Mitford, Rupert (1978). The Sutton Hoo Ship-Burial, Volume 2: Arms, Armour and Regalia. London: British Museum Publications. ISBN 978-0-7141-1331-9.
- Grieg, Sigurd (1947). Gjermundbufunnet: En høvdingegrav fra 900-årene fra Ringerike. Norske Oldfunn (in Norwegian). Vol. VIII. Oslo: Bergen.
- Munksgaard, Elisabeth (1984). "A Viking Age Smith, his Tools and his Stock-in-trade". Offa. 41: 85–89. ISSN 0078-3714.
- "Museum - et program om norsk historie" [Museum - a program about Norwegian history]. NRK (in Norwegian). 1 March 2019.
- Steuer, Heiko (1987). "Helm und Ringschwert: Prunkbewaffnung und Rangabzeichen germanischer Krieger" [Helmet and Ring-Sword: Ornamental Weapons and Insignia of Germanic Warriors]. In Häßler, Hans-Jürgen (ed.). Studien zur Sachsenforschung [Studies in Saxon Research] (in German). Vol. 6. Hildesheim: Lax. pp. 189–236. ISBN 3-7848-1617-7.
- Stylegar, Frans-Arne H. (9 December 2021). "Nytt lys på Gjermundbu-funnet: Var vikingen på Ringerike en ledende kriger i Kiev?". forskersonen (in Norwegian). Archived from the original on 23 December 2022.
- Stylegar, Frans-Arne H. & Børsheim, Ragnar Løken (November 1982). "Gjermundbufunnet – en småkonges grav med østlig tilsnitt på Ringerike" [The Gjermundbu find – a petty king’s grave in Ringerike showing influences from the East]. Viking (in Norwegian). LXXXV (1): 89–122. doi:10.5617/viking.9089. ISSN 0332-608X. S2CID 245155476.
- Tweddle, Dominic (1983). "The Coppergate Helmet" (PDF). Fornvännen. 78: 105–112. ISSN 0015-7813. Archived from the original (PDF) on 2021-12-17.
- Tweddle, Dominic (1992). The Anglian Helmet from 16–22 Coppergate. The Archaeology of York. Vol. 17/8. London: Council for British Archaeology. ISBN 1-872414-19-2. Archived from the original on 21 March 2024.
- Vike, Vegard [@VegardVike] (15 January 2018). "Today I started #conservation work on the Gjermundbu helmet - sometimes referred to as the only #Viking Helmet. The process will entail disassembly, micro-sandblasting, detailed photos of all parts, X-ray, 3D-scan and a new mounting. Photo: Jessica Leigh McGraw @Kulturhistorisk" (Tweet) – via Twitter.
- Vike, Vegard (11 September 2020). "The Viking helmet from Yarm". Museum of Cultural History. University of Oslo.
- Vlasatý, Tomáš (2 October 2016). "The helmet from Gjermundbu". Project Forlǫg. Archived from the original on 23 December 2022.
