= Tjele helmet fragment =

Viking Age fragment of a helmet

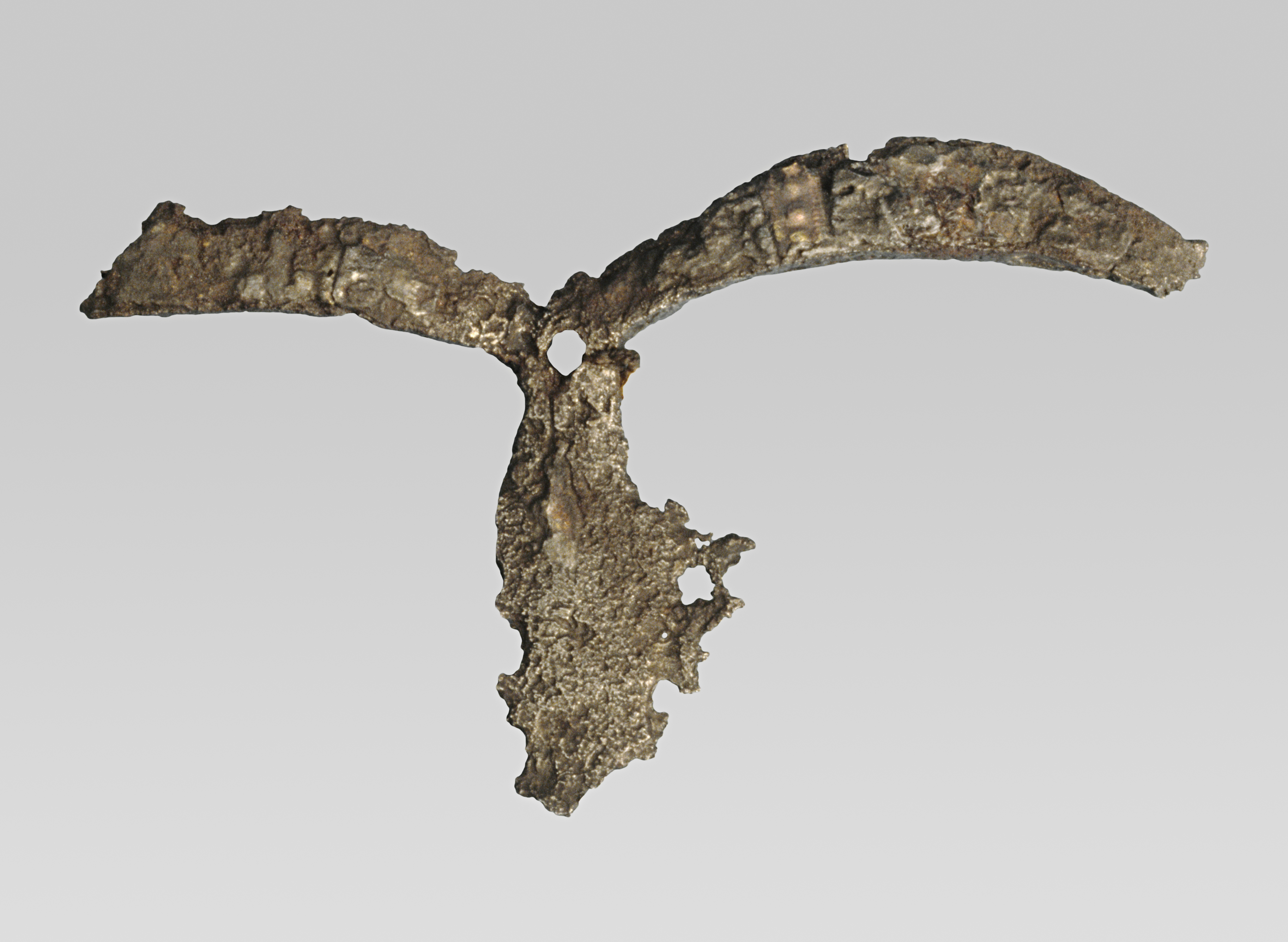
- Tjele helmet fragment
- Material: Iron, bronze
- Size: 12 cm × 7 cm (4 3/4 in × 2 3/4 in)
- Created: c. 950–970 AD
- Discovered: 1850; Tjele, Denmark
- Present location: National Museum of Denmark

The Tjele helmet fragment is a Viking Age fragment of iron and bronze, originally comprising the eyebrows and noseguard of a helmet. It was discovered in 1850 with a large assortment of smith's tools in Denmark, and though the find was sent to the National Museum of Denmark, for 134 years the fragment was mistaken for a saddle mount. In 1984 it was properly identified by an assistant keeper at the museum as the remainder of one of only five known helmets from the Viking era.

Dating to approximately 950 to 970 AD, the Tjele fragment is joined by the Gjermundbu helmet, two fragments from Gotland, and one from Kyiv, as the known Viking Age helmets. These represent the final evolution of the "crested helmets" used in Europe from the sixth century onwards, and known primarily for Anglo-Saxon and Vendel Period examples such as the Sutton Hoo helmet. The Tjele fragment is one of only two such helmets discovered in Denmark; the earlier Gevninge helmet fragment, made in approximately 550 to 700 AD, was discovered in 2000.

== Description ==
A "wing-shaped object", the fragment measures approximately 12 cm (4 3/4 in) wide and 7 cm (2 3/4 in) tall. It was made in one piece, and has "evidence of possible extensions towards the base of the nasal". Though now the fragment comprises only the eyebrows and nasal of a helmet, it likely once formed part of a face mask like that on the Gjermundbu helmet, which had "curved linking strips" circling under the wearer’s eyes. The method employed to construct the remainder of the helmet is unknown. "There is not a trace of chain mail in the find, nor any iron plates fit for making up the rest of the helmet." Eight fragments of "thin iron strips, about 1 cm [3/8 in] broad and of varying length" were found, however, and may have been originally used to join the helmet plates.

== Discovery ==
The Tjele fragment was discovered amidst a tenth century collection of smith's tools in 1850, but its significance was not understood until 1984. Originally discovered by a farmer planting saplings by Tjele Manor, between Viborg and Randers, it was sent by the manor's owner to the National Museum of Denmark, where it remains today. In 1858 the collection of tools—two anvils, five hammers, three pairs of tongs, a pair of plate shears, two files, a chisel, two drawplates, two foundry ladles, a whetstone, a set of balance scales with ten weights, five sickles, a key, three iron nails, an axe, two jingles, a spearhead, bronze wires, fragments of bronze and iron, and the remains of a casket—was published, but the helmet fragment passed over as a saddle mounting. After leading "an unnoticed existence" for some 130 years despite being on display, the fragment was finally recognized as the remainder of a helmet by Elisabeth Munksgaard, the assistant keeper at the museum's Department of the Prehistory of Denmark. Publishing her realisation in 1984, she noted that "the best finds are often made not in the field, but in the museums."

== Typology ==
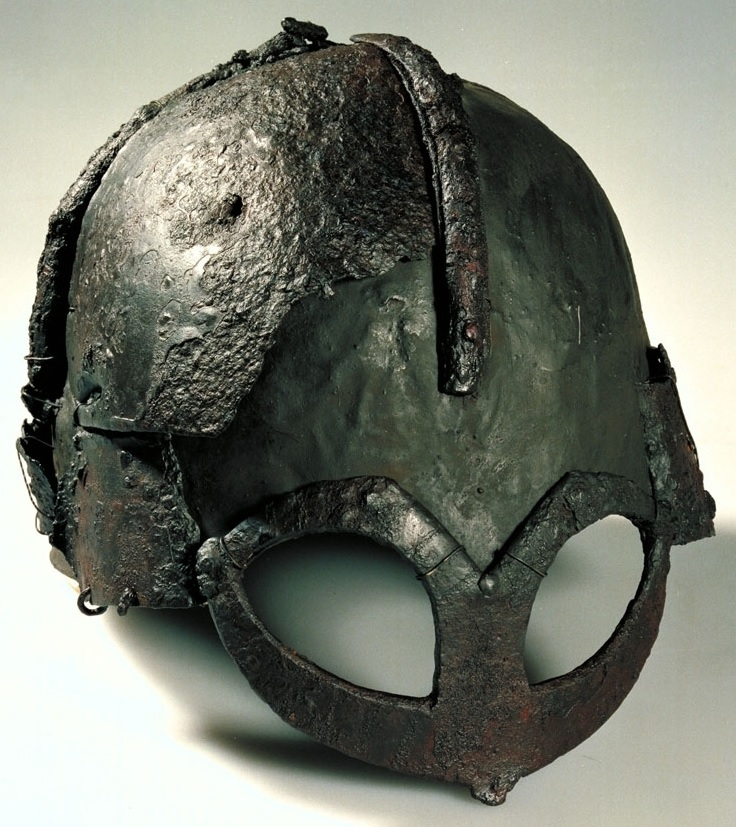
The Gjermundbu helmet

A date of 950 to 970 AD has been suggested for the Tjele tools, placing them, and the helmet fragment, towards the end of the Viking Age, which lasted from the end of the eighth century to the middle of the eleventh. The contemporary Gjermundbu helmet was found near Haugsbygd, Norway, while fragments from three others were found in Gotland, Sweden — one in Lokrume and one in Högbro — and in Kiev, Ukraine. These five helmets, the only ones known from the Viking Age, appear to be descendants of the earlier Scandinavian Vendel Period and Anglo-Saxon helmets, and the end of the line of "crested helmets" that appeared in Europe around the sixth century. In this context the Tjele fragment is one of two such helmets known from Denmark, joined by the pre-Viking (c. 550–700 AD) Gevninge helmet fragment, discovered in 2000.

== Bibliography ==
- Boye, Vilhelm (1858). "To fund af smedeværktöi fra den sidste hedenske tid i Danmark". Annaler for Nordisk Oldkyndighed og Historie (in Danish): 191–200, pl. II–IV.
- Christensen, Tom (2015). Lejre bag myten : de arkæologiske udgravninger (in Danish). Højbjerg: Jysk Arkæologisk Selskab. ISBN 978-87-88415-96-4.
- "Hjelmfragment Tjele" [Tjele helmet fragment]. Nationalmuseets Samlinger Online (in Danish). National Museum of Denmark. 22 December 2016.
- Jørgensen, Lise Bender (Autumn 1998). "Obituary: Elisabeth Munksgaard" (PDF). Archaeological Textiles Newsletter. 27: 5–6. Archived from the original (PDF) on 2018-11-25.
- Leth-Larsen, Bodil (1984). "Selected Objects from the Stock of the Tjele Smith". Offa. 41: 91–96. ISSN 0078-3714.
- Lund, Julie (2006). "Vikingetidens værktøjskister i landskab og mytologi" (PDF). Fornvännen (in Danish). 101 (5): 323–341. ISSN 0015-7813. Archived from the original (PDF) on 2018-11-26.
- Munksgaard, Elisabeth (1984). "A Viking Age Smith, his Tools and his Stock-in-trade". Offa. 41: 85–89. ISSN 0078-3714.
- Ohlhaver, Horst (1939). Der germanische Schmied und sein Werkzeug. Hamburger Schriften zur Vorgeschichte und germanischen Frühgeschichte. Vol. 2. Leipzig: Curt Kabitzsch.
- Price, Neil & Mortimer, Paul (2014). "An Eye for Odin? Divine Role-Playing in the Age of Sutton Hoo". European Journal of Archaeology. 17 (3). European Association of Archaeologists: 517–538. doi:10.1179/1461957113Y.0000000050.
- Steuer, Heiko (1987). "Helm und Ringschwert: Prunkbewaffnung und Rangabzeichen germanischer Krieger" [Helmet and Ring-Sword: Ornamental Weapons and Insignia of Germanic Warriors]. In Häßler, Hans-Jürgen (ed.). Studien zur Sachsenforschung [Studies in Saxon Research] (in German). Vol. 6. Hildesheim: Lax. pp. 189–236. ISBN 3-7848-1617-7.
- Storms, Godfrid (1978). "The Sutton Hoo Ship Burial: An Interpretation". Berichten van de Rijksdienst voor het Oudheidkundig Bodemonderzoek. 28: 309–344.
- Tweddle, Dominic (1992). The Anglian Helmet from 16–22 Coppergate. The Archaeology of York. Vol. 17/8. London: Council for British Archaeology. ISBN 1-872414-19-2. Archived from the original on 21 March 2024.
