= Coppergate Helmet =

8th-century Anglo-Saxon helmet

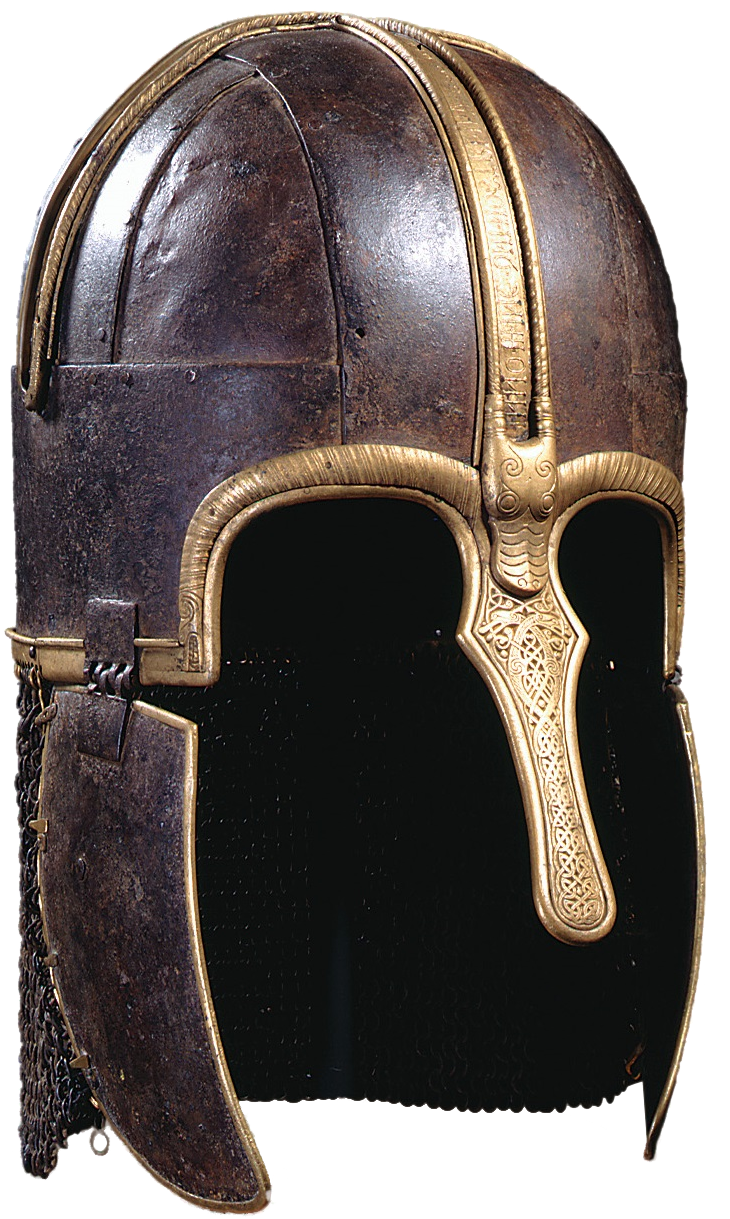
- The Coppergate Helmet
- Material: Iron, brass containing 85% copper
- Created: 8th century
- Discovered: 1982; York, North Yorkshire
- Present location: Yorkshire Museum
- Registration: YORCM : CA665

The Coppergate Helmet (also known as the York Helmet) is an eighth-century Anglo-Saxon helmet found in York, England. It was discovered in May 1982 during excavations for the Jorvik Viking Centre at the bottom of a pit that is thought to have once been a well.

The helmet is one of seven Anglo-Saxon helmets known to have survived to the present day, and is by far the best preserved. It shares its basic form with the helmet found at Wollaston (1997), joining that find and those at Benty Grange (1848), Sutton Hoo (1939), Yarm (1950s), Shorwell (2004) and Staffordshire (2009), as one of the "crested helmets" that flourished in England and Scandinavia from the sixth through to the eleventh centuries. It is now in the collections of the Yorkshire Museum.

== Description ==
=== Construction ===
The construction of the helmet is complex. Apart from the neck guard the basic form is shared by the contemporaneous Pioneer Helmet, a sparsely decorated fighting piece, and consists of four parts: an iron skull cap with brass edging and decorations, two iron cheek guards with brass edging, and camail protecting the neck.

The cap of the helmet has eight iron components. A brow band encircles the head; a nose-to-nape band extends from back to front, where it narrows and continues downwards as the nasal; two lateral bands each connect the side of the brow band to the top of the nose-to-nape band; and four subtriangular infill plates sit underneath the resulting holes. The eight pieces are riveted together. The brow band, 572 mm (22.5 in) long and 74 mm (2.9 in) to 87.4 mm (3.44 in) wide, is not entirely circular; a 69.8 mm (2.75 in) gap at the front is covered by the nose-to-nape band, which overlaps the brow band at the front and underlaps it at the back. Quadrant-shaped cutouts at the front, and rectangular cutouts at the sides, create eye-holes and attachment points for the cheek guard hinges. On the dexter side is a light and unexplained sketch of a rectangle with two lines in the shape of an 'X' connecting the corners. The nose-to-nape band is 492.8 mm (19.40 in) long and about 87.5 mm (3.44 in) wide, and is shaped at the front, possibly with a template before assembly, both to help facilitate the eye-holes and to continue down as the nasal. The two lateral bands, about 125 mm (4.9 in) long and 82 mm (3.2 in) wide, are riveted to the inside of the brow and nose-to-nape bands by three iron rivets on each end. The four infill plates are roughly triangular, but have their corners cut off to avoid overlapping the rivets holding the bands together. Their sizes vary considerably, likely because the edges are hidden from view. At the front the two infill plates are affixed underneath the bands by four rivets on either side and three at the bottom; at the back, five rivets on either side, and three at the bottom, hold each infill plate to the bands.

Four different types of brass edging, comprising seven individual pieces, are used on the cap. A plain binding extends around the front of the helmet, connecting the two cheek guard hinges and covering the edges of the nasal and eye-hole cutouts; a short strip on either side fills the space between the hinge and the end of the eyebrow; behind the hinge on either side, another short piece extends to the end of the cheek guard; and across the back of the helmet, connecting the ends of the cheek guard, runs a mail suspension strip. The plain binding is made from a piece of brass, up to 9.8 mm (0.39 in) wide, that is folded in half around the edge of the helmet. It appears to be made from a single piece of metal, and is attached with six brass rivets. Above these on either side, a strip approximately 19.4 mm (0.76 in) long and 9 mm (0.35 in) tall fills the space between the hinge and the end of the eyebrow, on which side it is moulded to the shape of the eyebrow's terminal animal head. The upper edges are folded over at the top. These strips are each affixed with two brass rivets and are primarily decorative, for they match the height of the two types of edge binding on the back of the helmet. The first of these types is made from one rectangular strip of brass per side, folded over into a U-shape and fitted over the approximately 35.5 mm (1.40 in) long portion of the brow band between the cheek guard hinge and the back of the cheek guard.

On the exterior of the helmet the strips are about 11.7 mm (0.46 in) tall, and have the tops folded over, as on the filler strips. Two brass rivets per side hold them in place. The final type of edge binding, the mail suspension strip, is similar to the pieces behind the hinges that it abuts. It is made of folded over rectangular strips of brass, fitted over the edge of the brow band and with the top of the exterior edge itself folded down. Two pieces of equal length were used, abutting at the back of the helmet, although the sinister strip was not found with the helmet. The dexter strip is 162 mm (6.4 in) long and 10.3 mm (0.41 in) tall, and between its bottom and the bottom of the brow band, leaves a hollow 3.3 mm (0.13 in) high gap. Seven or eight slots, each between 1.1 mm (0.043 in) and 1.7 mm (0.067 in) wide, were cut for every 25 mm (0.98 in) of the strip. One ring of mail was placed into each slot, and a piece of iron wire 2.5 mm (0.098 in) in diameter was slotted through to hold them in place. The mail suspension strip was held on by silver rivets with domed heads; only two survive, though five were probably originally used.

Suspended from the cap are two cheek guards and a mail curtain. The cheek guards are made from individual pieces of iron and at their maximum dimensions are approximately 127 mm (5.0 in) long and 88 mm (3.5 in) wide. They are curved inward both laterally and longitudinally, and each held to the brow band by a single hinge. Both hinges are made of two pieces of iron, approximately 50 mm (2.0 in) long and 25 mm (0.98 in) wide, that were bent in half over a circular rod and then cut to create matching slots; the upper dexter piece has four slots and the lower piece three—one of which is broken—a pattern that is reversed on the sinister side. The upper halves fit over sections cut out of the brow band, the lower halves over the cheek guards, and all four pieces are held in place with two iron rivets. The slots mesh together, and are held in place by 2.4 mm (0.094 in) diameter iron pins, the sinister of which is missing and has been replaced.

The mail is remarkable in consisting of forge-welded links, rather than the far more common riveted links. The helmet was found to be made of iron, with applied brass-work containing approximately 85% copper.

=== Decoration ===
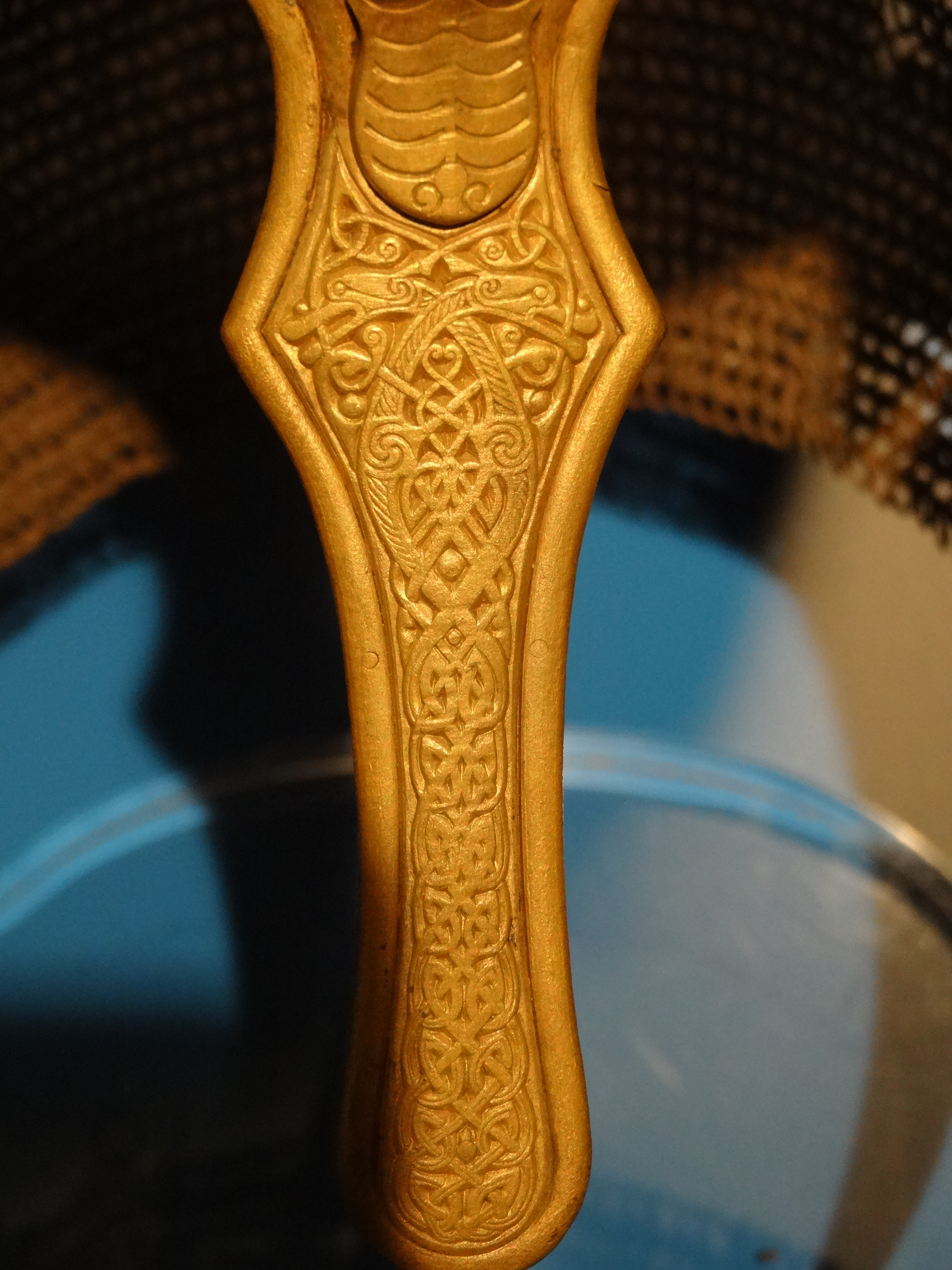
The nasal of the helmet showing decoration composed of two interlaced beasts

The helmet has two low crests of brass, one running from front to back, the other from side to side, forming a cross shape when viewed from above. The brass banding within the crests bears a Latin inscription:

IN NOMINE : DNI : NOSTRI : IHV : SCS : SPS : DI : ET : OMNIBVS : DECEMVS : AMEN: OSHERE : XPI

In the name of our Lord Jesus, the Holy Spirit, and God; and to all we say Amen / Oshere / Christ

An alternative interpretation suggests the following translation:

In the name of our Lord Jesus Christ and of the Spirit of God, let us offer up Oshere to All Saints. Amen.

Oshere is a male Anglian name and XPI are the first three letters of the word Christos Χριστός (khristos) in Greek.

The brass crest terminates in a decorative animal head at the base of the nasal. The brass eyebrow decorations that flank the nasal also terminate in animal heads. The decoration of the nasal consists of two intertwined beasts, whose bodies and limbs degenerate into interlace ornament.

== Typology ==
Like many other helmets of Germanic Western and Northern Europe in the Early Middle Ages the construction of the Coppergate helmet is derivative of Late Roman helmet types.

== Discovery ==
The helmet was discovered on 12 May 1982 during excavations for the Jorvik Viking Centre in York, North Yorkshire. The York Archaeological Trust had previously excavated 1000 m^{2} in the area from 1976 to 1981, finding evidence of Roman occupation in the area but very little indication of Anglo-Saxon settlement. In 1981 and 1982 an area five times the size of the initial excavation was developed, including for the construction of the Coppergate Shopping Centre and the Jorvik Viking Centre. As most of the land had not been subject to the earlier archaeological excavations, a watching brief was maintained during the construction.

At approximately 2:40 pm an excavator, using a flat scraper bucket to remove the natural clay a few centimetres at a time, struck an object. The foreman stopped work to check on the object's size, thinking it was a stone. His fingers wiped away the dust and exposed the golden band at the top of the helmet, after which he alerted the archaeologists on site. Their investigation showed a wood-lined pit, approximately 1.4m long on each side, and 20 cm (7.9 in) deep; nineteenth-century construction of a factory had removed the upper portion, and had come within a few centimetres of the helmet. Within the remaining portion were found a seemingly random collection of several pieces of wood and twigs, a sword-beater with textile impressions, a churn dasher, a fragment of a crucible, an antler beam, a rubbing stone, a fragment of glass, a fragment of hearth lining, seven fragments of slag, and three fragments of iron. These were removed before the helmet to free up space. The helmet itself had to be removed quickly, both to prevent corrosion caused by its first exposure to air in more than 1,000 years and for reasons of security, and by 8:30 it had been placed atop crumpled paper in a plastic bowl and packed away to spend the night in the "strong room" of the Borthwick Institute of Historical Research at the University of York.

The helmet is easily the best preserved Anglo-Saxon example, although its violent manner of discovery caused it significant damage. The excavator appears to have struck near the top of the rear dexter side, shearing off rivets and taking the rear infill plate to pieces. The front infill plate was itself dislodged, while the lateral band was broken off and folded. This caused with it the crumpling and breaking into three pieces of the lateral inscription band, the rear edge pieces of which were lost entirely; these may have been catapulted across the construction site. The rear dexter portion of the nose-to-nape band was also driven inwards. The shock of the excavator's strike probably also accounts for a missing portion along the rear sinister brow band, which may have corroded before disintegrating with the impact. The suspension strip from which the camail would have hung was also missing in this area.

=== Archaeological context ===
The pit in which the helmet was found was lined with oak planks that had been pressed into the clay. It was most probably a well; the lack of food or human parasite ova remains suggests that it was not a toilet or cesspit, while plant and animal remains are consistent with an open, aquatic environment. The helmet appears to have been intentionally hidden within it, probably with the intention of recovery. The sinister cheek piece and the camail had been carefully removed and placed inside the cap, which was then placed upside down in the pit, keeping the three parts together. At the same time, the random assortment of items also found in the pit does not suggest that the helmet was deposited as a type of offering.

The volatile state of York during the eighth and ninth centuries would have given the helmet's owner ample opportunity to consider hiding it in a well. The Vikings invaded York in 866, the Northumbrians, unsuccessfully, a year later. Nor had the preceding century of Northumbrian rule been peaceful; between 758 and 867, every King of Northumbria whose fate is known was either murdered, killed in battle or forced out. Any one of these turbulent periods could have inspired the owner of the helmet to hide it with the unrealised intention of recovering it later.

== Conservation ==
For the five weeks following its discovery, the helmet was placed in an airtight Perspex box with a humid nitrogen atmosphere. This was to solve the seemingly contradictory problems of conserving any remaining organic matter, which would need to be kept moist, and conserving the iron of the helmet, which would normally need to be kept dry to avoid corrosion. The humid nitrogen environment avoided the latter danger by removing the oxygen needed for oxidation to occur. In this state the helmet was held stable; to allow for radiography and other examination it was removed from its container four times, for no more than two hours at a time, at which point some rusting occurred. The scans revealed the presence of the camail and the sinister cheek guard within the cap of the helmet, otherwise filled with clay. In mid-June the interior of the helmet was excavated in 10 mm (0.39 in) intervals, corresponding to the vertical slices taken of the helmet when it was CT scanned. No significant organic materials were found—it had been hoped that an interior leather cap, worn as additional padding, might be present—allowing the helmet to be protected against corrosion more easily, by sealing it in a new Perspex box desiccated with sachets of silica gel.

The helmet next had the accumulated layers of corrosion removed. This was done manually, using brushes and a scalpel, with an eye towards preserving the corrosion which itself retained the original surface texture of the helmet. Micro-abrasive blasting was used on some areas such as the sinister cheek guard, after its broken fragments were adhered together, as the corrosion was too heavy and the surfaces too fragile to press against with the scalpel. Most of the brass fittings needed only cleaning with glass bristle brush, and the interior of the cap was only lightly cleaned, leaving material for possible future analysis. The mail, extremely well preserved despite being a cemented block when removed from the cap of the helmet, was freed by using a scalpel and mounted needle to chip away the corrosion. Open rings were adhered closed, and cotton thread used to connect incomplete rings.

== Restoration ==
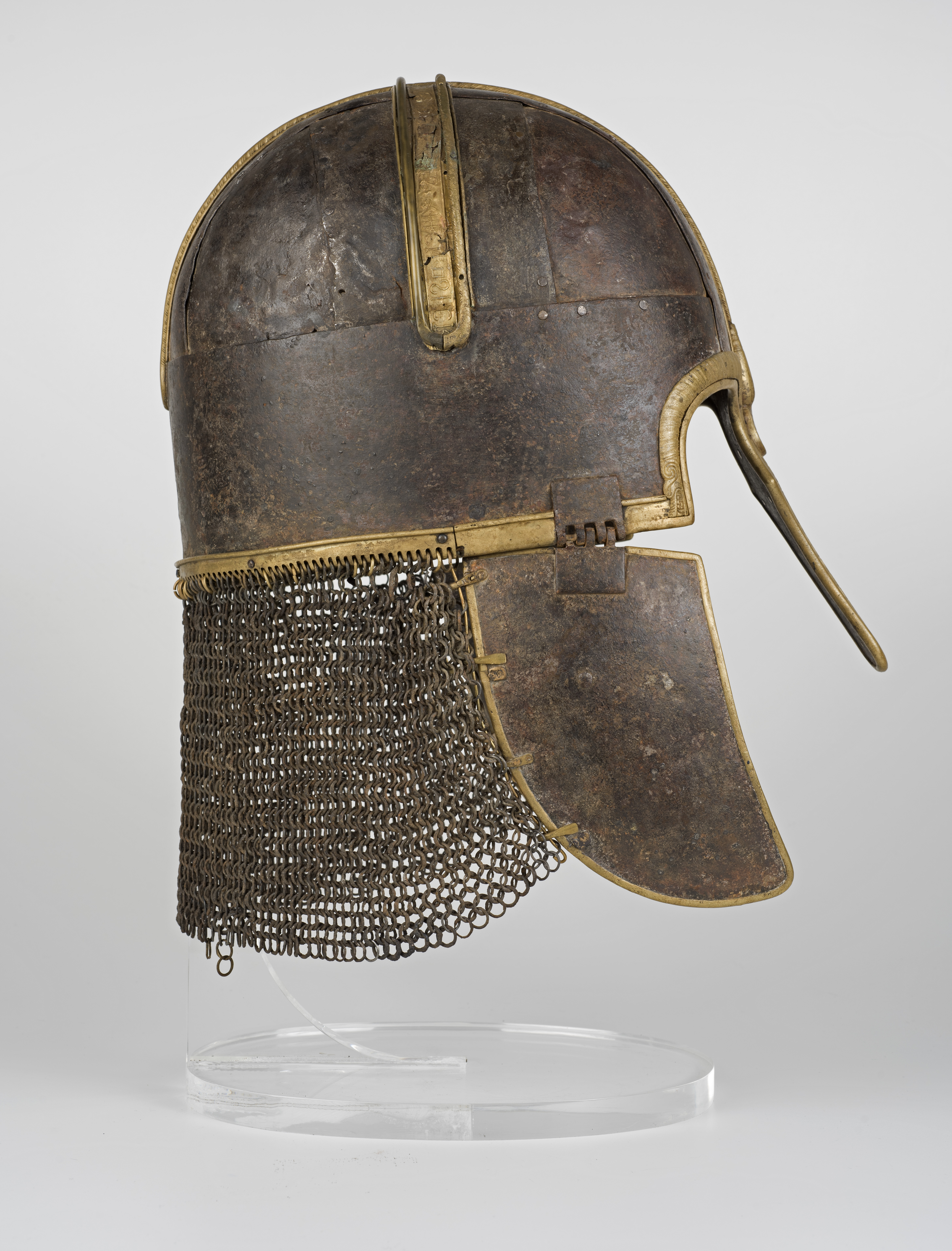
Coppergate helmet, dexter profile view

Discussions the following year considered sending the helmet away for restoration, and on 21 June 1983 it was sent to the British Museum. The museum's task was largely to undo the damage caused by the excavator by reshaping deformed pieces, reattaching loose fragments, and filling in missing areas. It was also tasked with creating a mount for display. The decision to restore the helmet was controversial. The York Archaeological trust argued that doing so would risk destroying archaeological evidence, but was overruled by the York City Council.

The nose-to-nape band was first reshaped with the use of a jig fastened to the helmet with three clamps, the middle of which was tightened to bend the metal into place. The remaining reshaping was primarily carried out with padded clamps, hammers, and wooden stakes, although small fragments of the dexter lateral band and rear infill place were soldered in place at a high temperature. The reshaped components were held in place using steel bolts; unlike the rivets originally used, the heads of the bolts are slightly raised from the surface of the helmet. The crushed and broken lateral inscription band, meanwhile, was annealed with a natural gas Bunsen burner before being reshaped with wood and Perspex levers. The two surviving strips edging the inscription band were manually reshaped, while the missing pieces, which may have been catapulted across the construction site by the excavator, were recreated with brass. The recreated strips did not repeat the engraved chevron pattern of the originals, creating a visible distinction between old and new. In its restored state, the inscription band was placed on the helmet with a cellulose nitrate adhesive. At some point in the process a slight dent in the front portion of the nose-to-nape inscription band was also reshaped, despite the belief that it represented contemporary use of the helmet, not post-deposition damage.

A new suspension strip was created to replace the missing sinister half, and damaged rings had new rings of iron wire adhered to them in support. The camail was then rehung, and attached to three loops on each cheek guard. Replacements were made for several missing loops. Gaps in protection were apparent between the loops, and so a wire was threaded through the loops to pull the rings against the cheek pieces; this was an invention of the laboratory with no evidence of contemporary practice, but is reversible.

The significant gaps in the helmet were filled in with polyester resin paste and fine copper gauze. The gauze was cut to fit the size of the holes and edged with tin solder. It was then held in place either by metal bolts put through the original rivet holes, or by the polyester resin paste. This paste was spread atop the gauze, creating a smooth surface that was then coloured with natural powder pigments and shellac dissolved in industrial methylated spirits to match the original tone of the helmet. Finally, the helmet was cleaned with 15% formic acid, washed with distilled water, dried in hot air, and coated with Renaissance Wax. A Perspex mount was built, containing three silicone rubber buffers on which the helmet rests. The restoration was completed in February 1984.

== Public display ==
The helmet forms part of the permanent collection of the Yorkshire Museum and has been included in many public exhibitions since its discovery.

During the 2009–2010 closure of the Yorkshire Museum for a major refurbishment, the helmet was displayed in the British Museum as part of the exhibition Treasures from Medieval York: England's other capital. When the museum reopened in August 2010 the helmet was displayed in the Medieval gallery in the exhibition Medieval York: The Power and the Glory. From 2012 to 2013 it was displayed in the York 1212: The Making of a City exhibition, celebrating 800 years since York received a Royal charter.

From 8 April to 5 May 2017, the helmet was on display in the Jorvik Viking Centre.

From 2017 the helmet formed part of a touring exhibition titled Viking: Rediscover the Legend and was displayed alongside the Bedale Hoard, the Vale of York hoard and the Cuerdale hoard, with the tour starting at the Yorkshire Museum in May 2017 with subsequent displays at the Atkinson Art Gallery and Library in Southport, Aberdeen Art Gallery, Norwich Castle Museum, and the University of Nottingham.

The helmet went back on display at the Yorkshire Museum in September 2019. It became a centrepiece of the Viking North exhibition when this was installed in July 2025.

== See also ==
- Nasal helmet
- Viking Age arms and armour

== General and cited references ==
- Addyman, Peter V. (28 August 1982). "The Coppergate Helmet". Archaeology. Illustrated London News. No. 7, 009. p. 53.
- Addyman, Peter V.; Pearson, Nicholas & Tweddle, Dominic (November 1982). "The Coppergate helmet". Antiquity. LVI (218): 189–194. doi:10.1017/S0003598X00054673. S2CID 54050677.
- Binns, James W.; Norton, Edward C. & Palliser, David M. (March 1990). "The Latin inscription on the Coppergate helmet". Antiquity. 64 (242): 134–139. doi:10.1017/S0003598X00077383.
- "Coppergate—SKB". Svensk Kärnbränslehantering AB. 23 May 2006. Archived from the original on 9 February 2007.
- Corfield, Michael (June 1988). "The reshaping of archaeological metal objects: some ethical considerations". Antiquity. 62 (218): 261–265. doi:10.1017/S0003598X00073981. S2CID 163560650.
- Cruickshank, Graeme (1985). Nechtansmere 1300: A Commemoration. Forfar: Forfar & District Historical Society. OCLC 315496533.
- James, Simon (1986). "Evidence from Dura Europos for the Origins of Late Roman Helmets". Syria. LXIII (1–2). Institut Francais du Proche-Orient: 107–134. doi:10.3406/syria.1986.6923. JSTOR 4198539.
- Meadows, Ian (March 2004). "An Anglian Warrior Burial from Wollaston, Northamptonshire". Northamptonshire Archaeology Reports. 10 (110) (2010 digital ed.). Northamptonshire County Council.
- Pyrah, Barbara J. (1988). The History of the Yorkshire Museum: And its Geological Collections. York: William Sessions. ISBN 1-85072-042-8.
- Read, Anthony (2006). "The Conservation of the Wollaston Anglian Helmet". In Smith, Robert Douglas (ed.). Make All Sure: The Conservation and Restoration of Arms and Armour. Leeds: Basiliscoe Press. pp. 38–43. ISBN 0-9551622-0-3.
- Spriggs, James A. (1982). "Conservation of the Helmet". Interim. 8 (4). York Archaeological Trust: 29–36. ISSN 0143-134X.
- Spriggs, James A. (1985). "The Coppergate Helmet – A Holding Operation". In Keene, Suzanne (ed.). Corrosion Inhibitors in Conservation: The Proceedings of a Conference held by UKIC in Association with the Museum of London. Occupational Papers. Vol. 4. London: United Kingdom Institute for Conservation. pp. 33–34. ISBN 0-9504155-4-5.
- Tweddle, Dominic (1983a). "The Coppergate Helmet" (PDF). Fornvännen. 78: 105–112. ISSN 0015-7813. Archived from the original (PDF) on 17 December 2021.
- Tweddle, Dominic (1983b). "The Coppergate helmet – a recent find in York". In Lamm, Jan Peder & Nordstrom, Hans-Åke (eds.). Vendel Period Studies: transactions of the Boat-Grave Symposium in Stockholm, February 2–3, 1981. Studies – The Museum of National Antiquities, Stockholm. Vol. 2. Stockholm: Statens Historiska Museum. pp. 190–191. ISBN 978-91-7192-547-3.
- Tweddle, Dominic (1984). The Coppergate Helmet. York: Cultural Resource Management Ltd.
- Tweddle, Dominic (1992). The Anglian Helmet from 16–22 Coppergate. The Archaeology of York. Vol. 17/8. London: Council for British Archaeology. ISBN 1-872414-19-2. Archived from the original on 21 March 2024.
- Webster, Leslie & Backhouse, Janet, eds. (1991). The Making of England: Anglo-Saxon Art and Culture AD 600–900. Toronto: University of Toronto Press. ISBN 0-8020-7721-8.
- Wilson, David M. (1984). Anglo-Saxon Art: From the Seventh Century to the Norman Conquest. London: Thames and Hudson. (US edition: Overlook Press)
