= Haugsbygd =

Village in Ringerike Municipality, Norway

Coordinates: 60°10′36″N 010°19′45″E

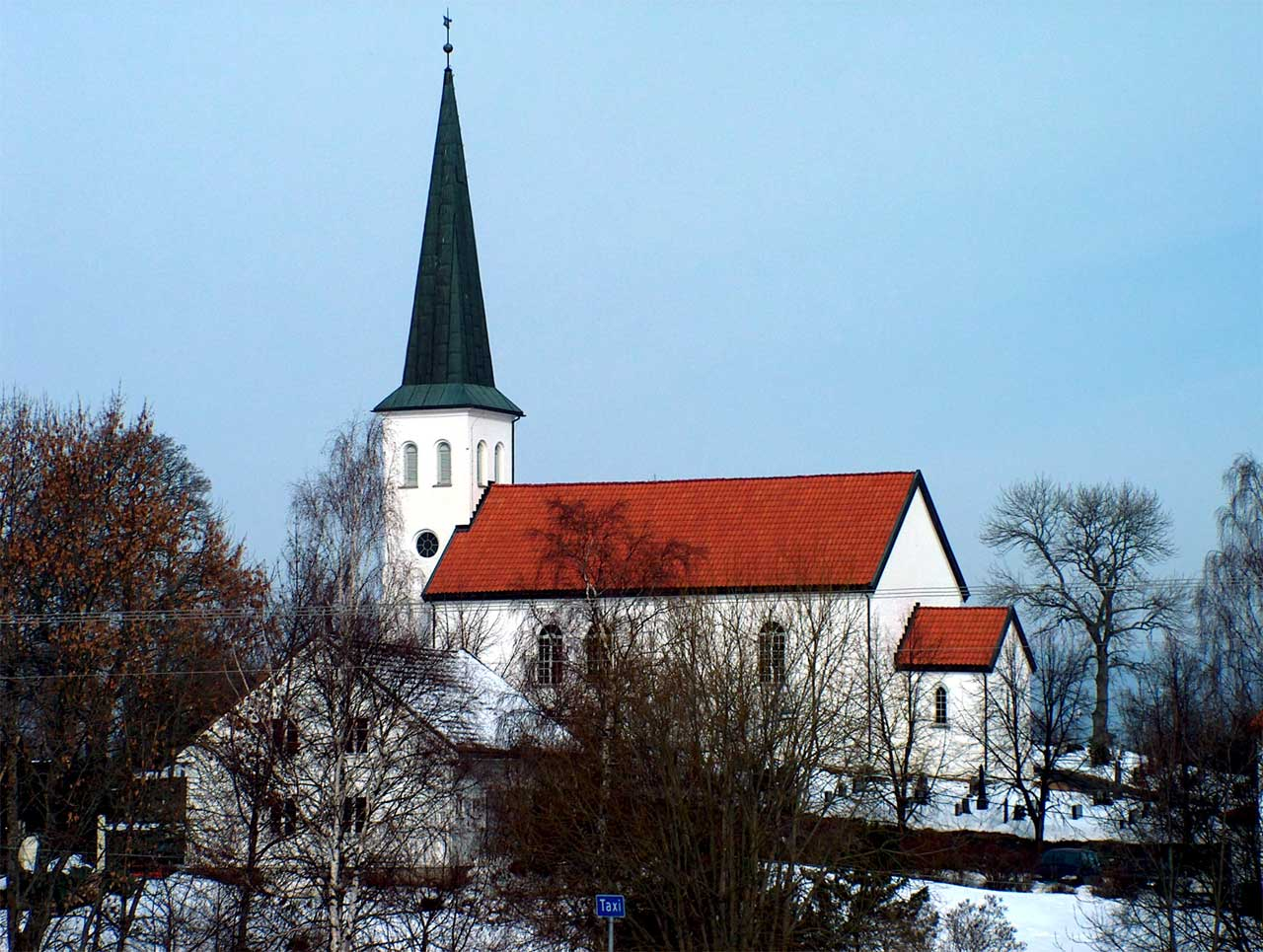
Haug Church at Haugsbygd, in Ringerike, Buskerud County, Norway

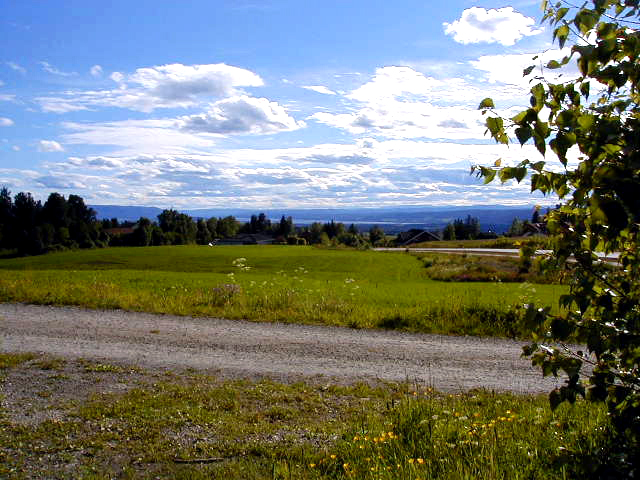
Ringerike landscape seen from Haugsbygd

Haugsbygd (formerly known as Vangsbygd and Vangsfjerdingen) is a village in Ringerike municipality, northeast of the center of Hønefoss, in Buskerud, Norway.

== Location ==
The village is known for its billowing landscape and is located at a relatively high elevation. Its area can be said to stretch from the border on Norderhov in the south to Knestang and Bølgentoppen at the border on Åsbygda in the north. Administratively, the area was part of Norderhov municipality before the great unification of the municipalities on 1 January 1964, but it currently belongs to the large municipality of Ringerike.

The center of the city is often known as Haug from the Old Norse word haugr meaning mound. Haug church, which is the main church of Haug parish, Vang primary school, and Haugsbygd lower secondary school, are located here. Previously, there was both a bank and a post office there, but after the bank and postal services started their rationalizations, these were merged.

Currently Haugsbygd mainly consist of agricultural estates and modern residential areas of detached houses. In recent years the area has been one of the most desirable building areas of Ringerike municipality, which repeatedly has opened new developments in Haugsbygd. There are roads leading to Haug over county road 163 Hønefoss to Klekken, either over Fløytingen north of Sætrang, or Øvre Klekkenvei south of Klekken Hotell. It is also possible to get to Haug over Riksvei 35 in direction of Jevnaker, over Viulveien from Hvalsmoen and Hvalsveien. One can also get there from Jevnaker or Norderhov over Riksvei over Åsbygda and Klekken, over Harehaugveien from Smeden south of Bølgen.

== Excavations ==
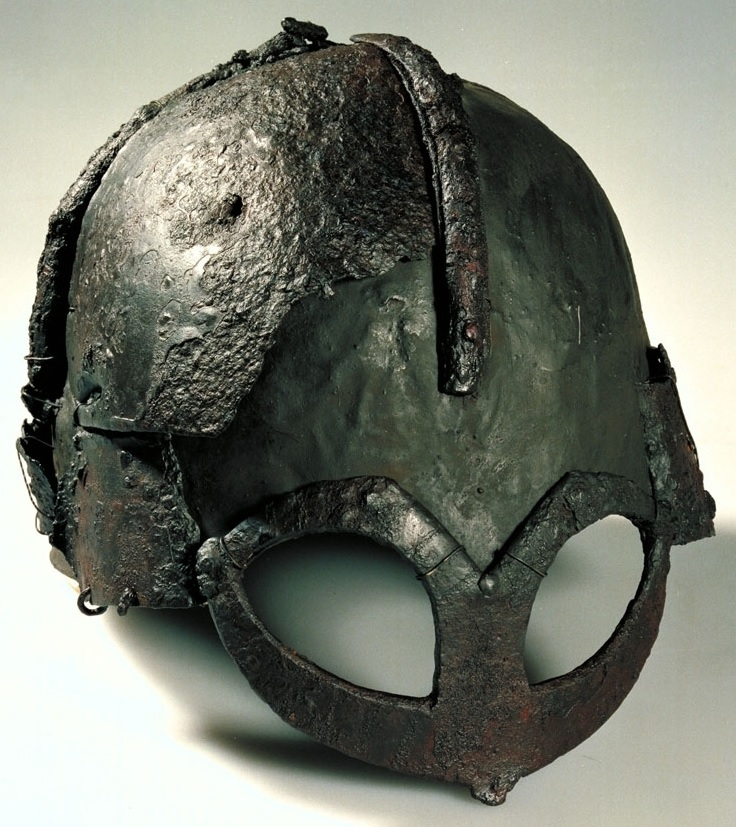
Gjermundbu helmet from mound burial (Museum of National Antiquities)

The village must have been of significance in the past. The Sætrang and Gjermundbu discoveries are proof of this.

The Sætrang discovery (Sætrangfunnet) was a rich grave finds from a burial mound dating to ca. 975 AD. The tomb was a double grave that was discovered in 1834 on the Sætrang farm Haugsbygd. The burial mound was about 20 meters in diameter and about 1.2 meters high. In the middle of the mound was found a double tomb. Contents included 63.89 grams of gold in the form of five gold rings and about 900 beads of amber, glass and glass mosaics, and a silver bead.

The Gjermundbu mound burial (Gjermundbufunnene) was unearthed during 1943 and contained many artifacts, most of those being weaponry or horse harnesses. A Viking Age helmet with aventail and a single fragmented, but possibly complete mail shirt have been excavated at the Gjermundbu farm. This helmet was made of iron and was in the shape of a rounded or peaked cap made from four plates after the spangenhelm pattern. The helmet has a rounded cap and has a "spectacle" guard around the eyes and nose that formed a sort of mask. Since its discovery, it is the only known example of a complete Viking helmet in existence.

== See also ==
Viking Age arms and armour
