= Almqvist & Wiksell =

Swedish publishing company

Almqvist & Wiksell is a former Swedish printing company (1882–2005) and publishing company (1923–1990). In 1990, it was bought by the educational publisher Liber, and is now an imprint owned by the latter.

== Almqvist & Wiksell Tryckeri ==
Almqvist & Wiksell Tryckeri AB in Uppsala was founded in October 1882, when philosophy graduate Robert Almqvist (1857–1938), son of politician Ludvig Teodor Almqvist and father of Sven Almqvist, and student Julius Wiksell (1855–1897) bought Edquist & Berglund's printing house. The company became a limited company (aktiebolag) in 1888. In 1904, after a "drawn-out fight" with publisher Norstedts, it was granted exclusive rights by the Royal Swedish Academy of Sciences to print almanacs, calendars and other similar works, including the Swedish state calendar. The first catalogue of calendar publications was published in 1906, and the company's exclusive rights continued until 1972.

In 1923 Carl Z Haeggström, who before 1918 had been managing director of Hæggströms boktryckeri och bokförlags AB, which had been acquired by Almqvist & Wiksell, became managing director of the company. The company was part of the AWT group, headed by the Haeggström family, until 1973 when it was bought by Esselte. Almqvist & Wiksell Tryckeri AB was bought by Alfa Print in Sundbyberg in 2000 and went bankrupt in 2005.

The business was located on Västra Ågatan in central Uppsala's Kaniken neighborhood from 1892 to 1974. Almqvist & Wiksell were pioneers in computerization of the printing industry in Sweden, developing a system for computerized typesetting. This led to the company moving production to a new facility on Rapsgatan in the Fyrislund area of Uppsala; the company's goal was to combine their computer department and Stockholm and Uppsala presses.

The former site in Kaniken now houses the Kaniken business center and Filmstaden cinema. These premises also housed a bookbindery under the same management. The printing business has ceased, and the premises are now used as a postal terminal, a floorball hall and a school.

== Almqvist & Wiksell Förlag ==
The publisher Almqvist & Wiksell Förlag AB in Stockholm was founded in 1923 as a subsidiary of Almqvist & Wiksell Tryckeri AB. In 1928, the publishing business was merged with publisher Hugo Gebers förlag, which was reorganized into the limited company Almqvist & Wiksell/Gebers Förlag AB (AWG).

After several changes of ownership, the publishing house has been part of the Liber group since 1990, where the original name is used as a trademark for educational materials.

== Almqvist & Wiksell International ==
In 1991, Almqvist & Wiksell International, which at the time published 42 scientific journals, was purchased by Norwegian publisher Universitetsforlaget.
