= Elisabeth Munksgaard =

Danish historian

- Born: 1924; Denmark
- Died: 13 November 1997 (aged 72–73); Denmark
- Occupations: Historian; writer
- Notable work: Oldtidsdragter

Elisabeth Munksgaard (1924 – 13 November 1997) was a Danish historian and from 1962 until retiring in 1990, the assistant Keeper in the Department of the Prehistory of Denmark at the National Museum of Denmark. She was "Denmark's acknowledged expert" on art from the late Iron Age and Viking Age.

Munksgaard's work encompassed multiple aspects of prehistoric Denmark. In 1974 she published the book Oldtidsdragter, for decades the authoritative work on ancient Scandinavian clothing. Over time her ideas developed to suggest a particular style of dress for the eleventh century King Canute, an idea so central to her scholarship that the "finale" to her career was the installation in the museum of a replica of the king. In 1984 Munksgaard furthermore identified the Tjele helmet fragment as the remnant of one of the only known Viking helmets, rather than the saddle mount it had been misidentified as for 130 years.

== Biography ==
Born in 1924, Munksgaard earned her MA in Prehistoric Archaeology at the University of Copenhagen in 1953. Following a research fellowship in Cambridge and London from 1953 to 1954, she joined the National Museum of Denmark as a research assistant, becoming assistant keeper at the museum's Prehistory of Denmark department in 1962 until she retired in 1990. Taking a special interest in late Iron-age and Viking Age art, her papers on 5th-century gold rings and Late Antique silver were published in Acta Archaeologica in 1953 and 1955, presenting the results of her MA thesis. She went on to conduct studies into discoveries of late Iron-Age treasures and gold bracteates.

From 1967, Munksgaard developed an interest in the museum's unique collection of ancient textiles and clothing, publishing Oldtidsdragter on ancient Scandinavian clothing in 1974. At the time of her death it was still considered to be the authoritative work on the subject. She argued that two triangular silks from the Viking Age chamber tomb in Mammen were fragments of cloak bands, later maintaining in the 1989 edition of Aarbøger for Nordish Oldkyndighed that some of the Mammen textiles reflected details shown in the drawing of Canute in Liber Vitae. As a result, the Copenhagen Draper's Guild funded work on a costume designed to show "King Canute in all his splendour." It was unveiled shortly before Munksgaard's retirement in 1990, sixteen years after she had initially proposed the theory, in a "fine finale" to her career.

In the decade before her retirement, Munksgaard also identified the Tjele helmet fragment as the remainder of a Viking Age helmet. Discovered in 1850 amidst the tools of a metalsmith, it was mistaken for a saddle mount. The fragment led an "unnoticed existence" in the museum for the next 130 years; recognising it for what it actually was in 1984, Munksgaard noted that "it is quite true that the best finds are often made not in the field, but in the museums." The fragment is now identified as the remainder of one of only five known Viking helmets.

Elisabeth Munksgaard died on 13 November 1997, following a career during which she had made significant contributions to the National Museum's Department of Prehistory.

== Publications ==
- Munksgaard, Elisabeth (1984). "A Viking Age Smith, his Tools and his Stock-in-trade". Offa. 41: 85–89. ISSN 0078-3714.

== Bibliography ==
- Boye, Vilhelm (1858). "To fund af smedeværktöi fra den sidste hedenske tid i Danmark". Annaler for Nordisk Oldkyndighed og Historie (in Danish): 191–200, pl. II–IV.
- Jørgensen, Lise Bender (Autumn 1998). "Obituary: Elisabeth Munksgaard" (PDF). Archaeological Textiles Newsletter. 27: 5–6. Archived from the original (PDF) on 2018-11-25.
- Leth-Larsen, Bodil (1984). "Selected Objects from the Stock of the Tjele Smith". Offa. 41: 91–96. ISSN 0078-3714.
- Storms, Godfrid (1978). "The Sutton Hoo Ship Burial: An Interpretation". Berichten van de Rijksdienst voor het Oudheidkundig Bodemonderzoek. 28: 309–344.
- Tweddle, Dominic (1992). The Anglian Helmet from 16–22 Coppergate. The Archaeology of York. Vol. 17/8. London: Council for British Archaeology. ISBN 1-872414-19-2. Archived from the original on 21 March 2024.
