= Viking Age arms and armour =

Military technology of the Vikings from the late 8th to the mid-11th century

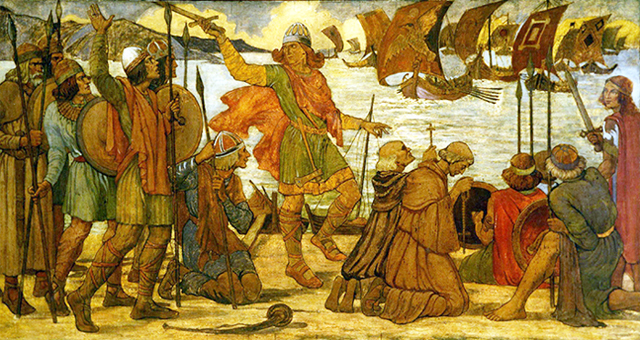
Viking landing at Dublin, 841, by James Ward (1851–1924)

Knowledge about military technology of the Viking Age (late 8th to mid-11th century Europe) is based on relatively sparse archaeological finds, pictorial representations, and to some extent on the accounts in the Norse sagas and laws recorded in the 12th–14th centuries. According to custom, all free Norse men were required to own weapons and permitted to carry them at all times. Indeed, the Hávamál, purported to be sage advice given by Odin, states "Don't leave your weapons lying about behind your back in a field; you never know when you may need all of a sudden your spear."

As war was the most prestigious activity in Viking Age Scandinavia, beautifully finished weapons were an important way for a warrior to display his wealth and status. A wealthy Viking would likely have a complete ensemble of a spear, a wooden shield, and either a battle axe or a sword. Battle axes were considered the "normal weapon" for middle-class Vikings. Swords were normally reserved for the upper class and nobles due to their then-prohibitive cost. Much poetry was associated with Viking weapons. The richest might have a helmet and mail armour; these are thought to have been limited to the nobility and their professional warriors (retainers). Poorer warriors may have used several layers of thick woollen clothing. The average farmer was likely limited to a spear, shield, and perhaps a common axe or large knife (seax). Some would also bring their hunting bows (mostly long bows or flat bows) to use in the opening stages of battle.

== Weapons ==
=== Knife (dagger) ===
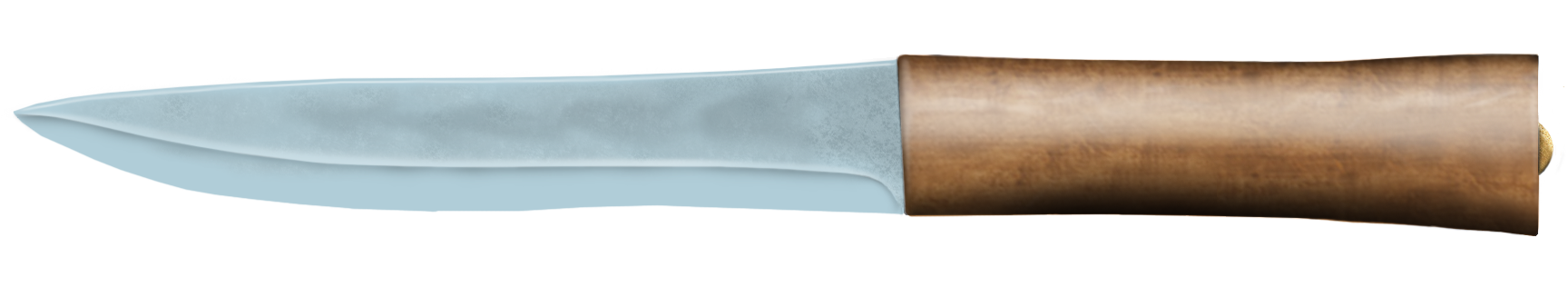
Viking knife, based on the finds exhibited at Jorvik Viking Centre

Two distinct classes of knives were in use by Vikings. The more common one was a rather plain, single-edge knife of normal construction, called a knifr. These are found in most graves, being the only weapon allowed for all, even slaves. Smaller versions served as the everyday utility tool, while longer versions were likely meant for hunting or combat or both. Weapon knives sometimes had ornamental inlays on the blade. The construction was similar to traditional Scandinavian knives. The tang ran through a more or less cylindrical handle, the blade was straight with the edge sweeping upward at the tip to meet the back of the blade in a point. The knife apparently played an important role for all Scandinavians. This is evidenced by the large number of knives found in burial sites of not just the men, but the women and the children too.

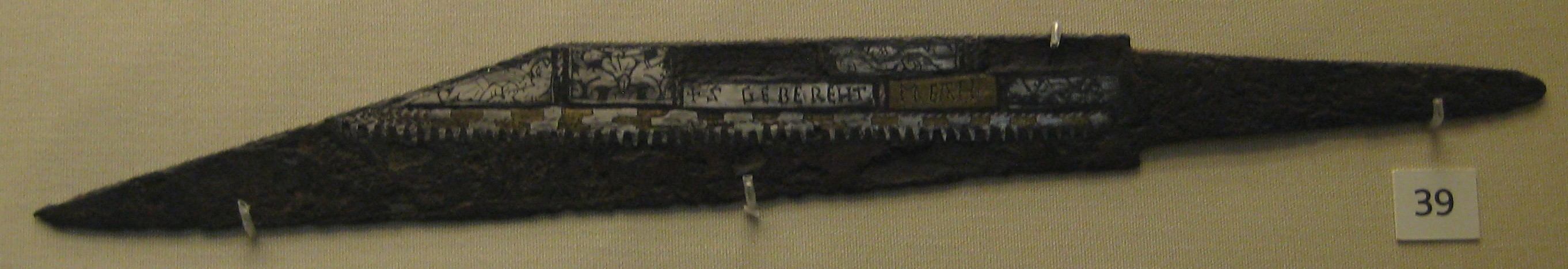
Broken-back seax from Sittingbourne in Kent

The other type was the seax. The type associated with Vikings is the so-called broken-back style seax. It was usually a bit heavier than a regular knife and served as a machete- or falchion-like arm. A wealthier man might own a larger seax, some being effectively swords. With the single edge and heavy blade, this somewhat crude weapon was relatively simple to use and produce, compared to the regular sword. A rather long tang is fitted to many examples, indicating that they may have had a longer handle for two-handed use. The smaller knife-like seaxes were likely within the fabrication ability of a common blacksmith.

The seax was in widespread use among the migration period Germanic tribes, and is even eponymous of the Saxons. It appears in Scandinavia from the 4th century, and shows a pattern of distribution from the lower Elbe (the Irminones) to Anglo-Saxon England. While its popularity on the continent declines with the end of the migration period, it remained in the British Isles where it was taken up by the Vikings. The large, sword-like seaxes are primarily found in connection with Viking settlements in England and Ireland, but do not appear very commonly in Scandinavia.

=== Sword ===
The Viking Age sword was for single-handed use to be combined with a shield, with a double edged blade length of up to 90 cm (35 in). Its shape was still very much based on the Roman spatha with a tight grip, long deep fuller and no pronounced cross-guard. It was not exclusive to the Vikings, but rather was used throughout Europe.

Swords were very costly to make and a sign of high status. Many were rarely used, and some swords found in graves were probably not sturdy enough for battle or raiding, and instead were likely decorative items. Like Roman spathae, they were worn in leather-bound wooden scabbards suspended from a strap across the right shoulder. Early blades were pattern welded, a technique in which strips of wrought iron and mild steel were twisted and forged together, with the addition of a hardened edge. Later blades of homogeneous steel, imported probably from the Rhineland, many bearing inlaid makers' marks and inscriptions, such as Ingelrii or Vlfberht. Local craftsmen often added their own elaborately decorated hilts, and many swords were given names, such as Leg-biter and Gold-hilt. The sword grip was usually made of an organic material, such as wood, horn, or antler (which does not often survive for archaeological uncovering), and may well have been wound around with textile.

Owning a sword was a matter of high honour. Persons of status might own ornately decorated swords with silver accents and inlays. Most Viking warriors would own a sword as one raid was usually enough to afford a good blade. Most freemen would own a sword with goðar, jarls and sometimes richer freemen owning much more ornately decorated swords. The poor farmers would use an axe or spear instead but after a couple of raids they would then have enough to buy a sword. One sword mentioned in the Laxdæla saga was valued at half a crown, which would correspond to the value of 16 milk-cows. Constructing such weapons was a highly specialized endeavour and many sword-blades were imported from foreign lands, such as the Rhineland. Swords could take up to a month to forge and were of such high value that they were passed on from generation to generation. Often, the older the sword, the more valuable it became.

A distinct class of early single edged swords is known from Eastern Norway at the time. These had the same grips as the double edged swords, and blades of comparable length. The blades varied from long and slim, like the more common two edged swords, to somewhat heavy, giving the weapon a more cleaver-like balance. Confusingly, the same finds are sometimes classified as "sabres" or "seaxes" in English literature.

As mentioned above, a sword was so valued in Norse society that good blades were prized by successive generations of warriors. There is even some evidence from Viking burials for the deliberate and possibly ritual "killing" of swords, which involved the blade being bent so that it was unusable. Because Vikings were often buried with their weapons, the "killing" of swords may have served two functions, namely a ritualistic function in retiring a weapon with a warrior, and a practical one in deterring any grave robbers from disturbing the burial in order to get one of these costly weapons. Indeed, archaeological finds of the bent and brittle pieces of metal sword remains testify to the regular burial of Vikings with weapons, as well as the habitual "killing" of swords.

Viking Swords and axes

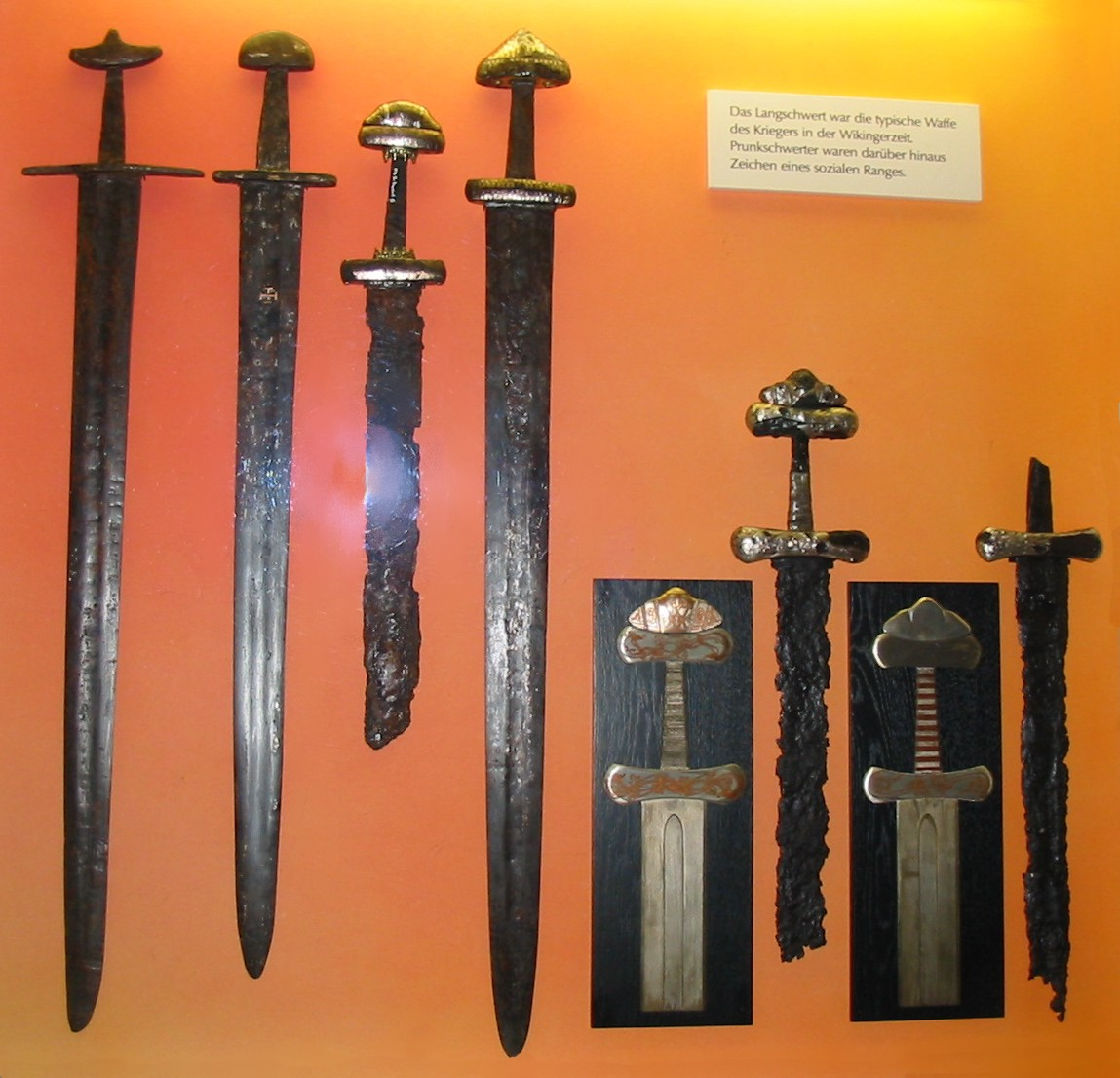
Viking swords displayed at Hedeby Viking Museum

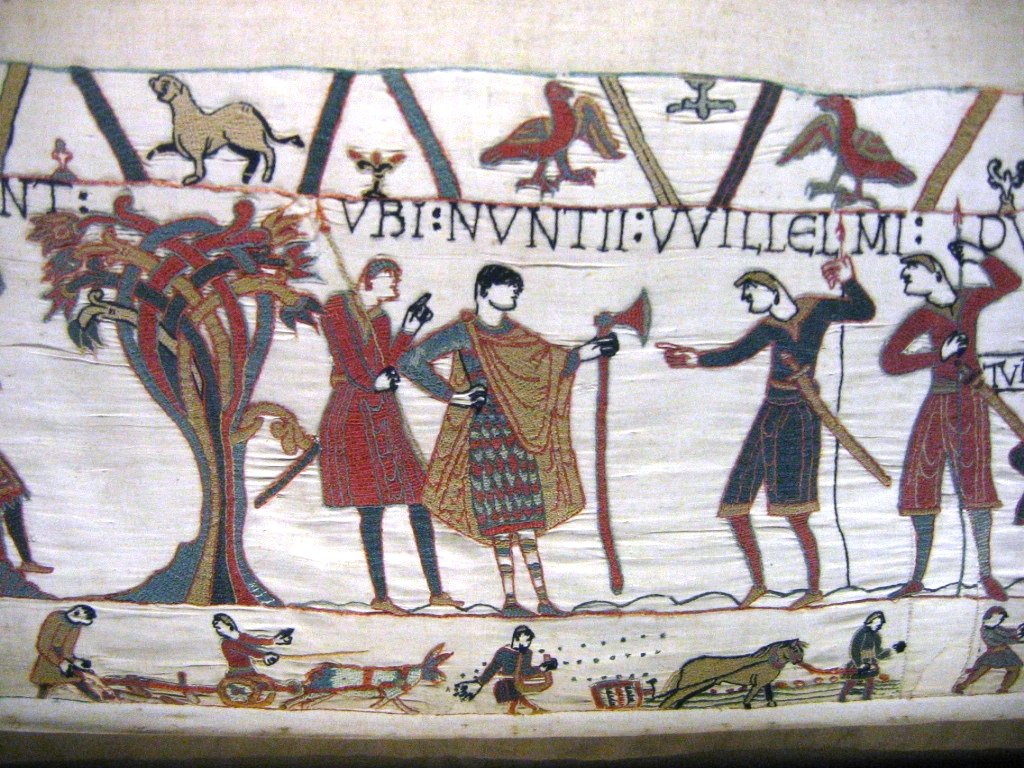
A Danish axe on the Bayeux Tapestry

Two axes found in Western Norway on display in Bergen

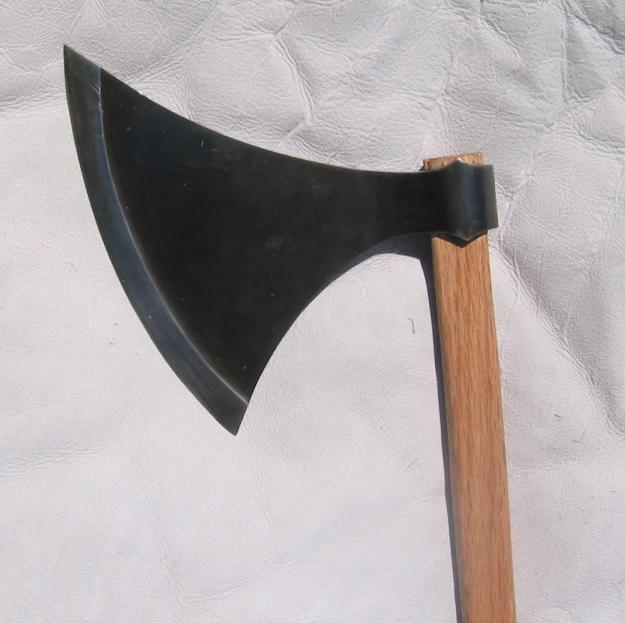
Modern reproduction of a Dane axe

=== Axe ===
The most common hand weapon among Vikings was the axe – swords were more expensive to make and only wealthy warriors could afford them. The prevalence of axes in archaeological sites can likely be attributed to its role as not just a weapon, but also a common tool. This is supported by the large number of grave sites of female Scandinavians containing axes. Several types of larger axes specialized for use in battle evolved, with larger heads and longer shafts, including various types of bearded axes. The larger forms were as long as a man and made to be used with both hands, called the Dane Axe. Some axe heads were inlaid with silver designs. In the later Viking era, there were axe heads with crescent shaped edges measuring up to 45 centimetres (18 in) called breiðöx (broadaxe). The double-bitted axes depicted in modern "Viking" art would have been very rare as it used more material and was seen as a waste during hard times, if they existed at all. No surviving examples, authentic artwork or clear descriptions from records support the existence of double-bitted axes used by Vikings. Double-bitted axes were not forged by the Norse. Just about every axe they forged was single headed.

Vikings most commonly carried sturdy axes that could be thrown or swung with head-splitting force. The Mammen Axe is a famous example of such battle-axes, ideally suited for throwing and melee combat.

An axe head was mostly wrought iron, with a steel cutting edge. This made the weapon less expensive than a sword, and was a standard item produced by blacksmiths, historically.

Like most other Scandinavian weaponry, axes were often given names. According to Snorri Sturluson's Prose Edda, axes were often named after she-trolls.

=== Spear ===
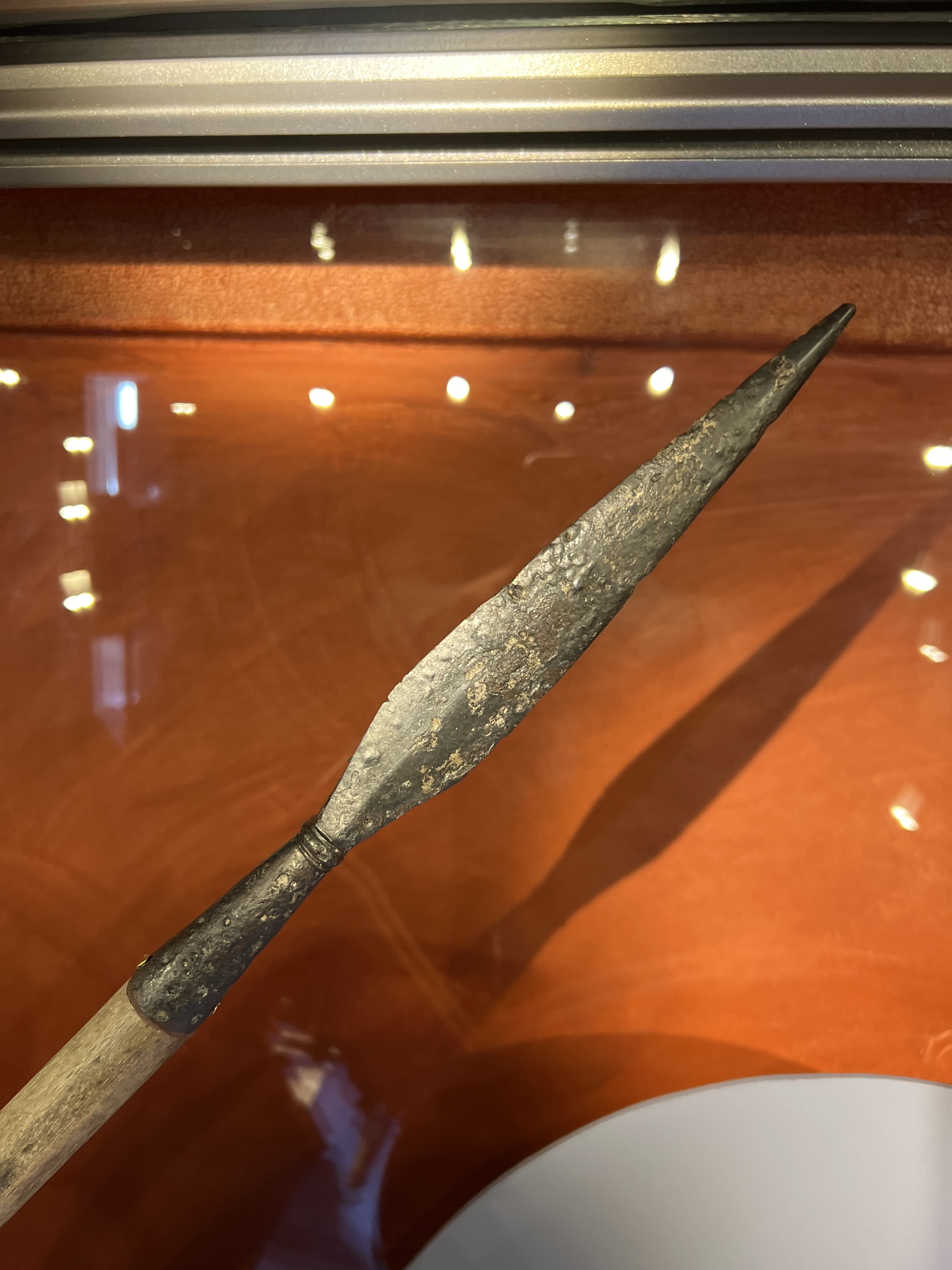
Viking Age spear tip (Swedish History Museum)

The spear was the most common weapon of the Scandinavian peasant class. Throwing spears were constantly used by the warrior class; despite popular belief, it was also the principal weapon of the Viking warrior, an apt fit to their formations and tactics. They consisted of metal heads with a blade and a hollow shaft, mounted on wooden shafts of two to three metres in length, and were typically made from ash wood. The spear heads could measure between twenty and sixty centimetres with a tendency towards longer heads in the later Viking Age. Spear heads with wings are called krókspjót (hooked spear) in the sagas. Some larger-headed spears were called höggspjót (chopping spear) and could also be used for cutting. The barbed throwing spears were often less decorated than the ostentatious thrusting spears, as the throwing spears were often lost in battle.

The spear was used both as a throwing weapon and as a thrusting weapon, although there was some specialization in design. Lighter, narrower spearheads were made for throwing; heavier broader ones, for stabbing. Most evidence indicates that they were used in one hand. Limited evidence from a saga indicates that they may have been used with two hands, but not in battle. The head was held in place with a pin, which saga characters occasionally pull out to prevent a foe from re-using the weapon.

Compared with a sword, the spear can be made with inferior steel and far less metal overall. This made the weapon cheaper and probably within the capability of a common blacksmith to produce. Despite this, the spear held great cultural significance to the Viking warrior, as the primary weapon of Odin, the king of the Norse gods and the god of warfare, was the spear Gungnir. The Eyrbyggja saga alludes that a customary start to a battle included throwing a spear right over the enemy army to claim it for Odin. Possibly due to its cultural significance, pattern welded blades are common in spear heads, and the sockets were often decorated with silver inlaid patterns.

=== Other polearms ===
A polearm known as the atgeir is mentioned in several sagas of Icelanders and other literature. Atgeir is usually translated as "halberd", akin to a glaive. Gunnar Hámundarson is described in Njáls saga as cutting and impaling foes on his atgeir.

Several weapons (including the kesja and the höggspjót) appearing in the sagas are Viking halberds. No weapon matching their descriptions have been found in graves. These weapons may have been rare, or may not have been part of the funerary customs of the Vikings. A more likely explanation however is that these polearms are descriptions of early medieval weapons that have been added into the sagas; likely because they were written down during the same period.

=== Sling ===
The Viking age sling was easy to manufacture, consisting of a rope and sometimes a leather cup to assist with loading, giving many of the lower class access to a formidable weapon. Slingers make effective light infantry due to their lack of heavy equipment and open formation, and the concussive effect of slingstones even through metal armour.

=== Bows and arrows ===
The bow and arrow was used for both hunting and warfare. They were made from yew, ash or elm. The draw force of a 10th-century bow may have reached some 90 pounds force (400 N) or more, resulting in an effective range of at least 200 metres (660 ft) depending on the weight of the arrow. A yew bow found at Viking Hedeby, which probably was a full-fledged war bow, had a draw force of well over 100 pounds. Replica bows using the original dimensions have been measured to between 100–130 pounds (45–59 kg) draw weight. A unit of length used in the Viking Age called a bow shot corresponded to what was later measured as 227.5 metres (746 ft). Illustrations from the time show bows being pulled back to the chest, rather than to the corner of the mouth or under the chin, as is common today.

Arrowheads were typically made from iron and produced in various shapes and dimensions, according to place of origin. Most arrowheads were fixed onto the arrow shaft by a shouldered tang that was fitted into the end of a shaft of wood. Some heads were also made of wood, bone or antler. Evidence for eagle feather flights has been found with the feathers being bound and glued on. The end of the shaft was flared with shallow self nocks, although some arrows possessed bronze cast nocks. The historical record also indicates that Vikings may have used barbed arrows, but the archaeological evidence for such technology is limited.

The earliest find of these relics were found in Denmark, seemingly belonging to the leading-warrior class based on the graves in which they were found.

== Shields ==
=== Round shields ===
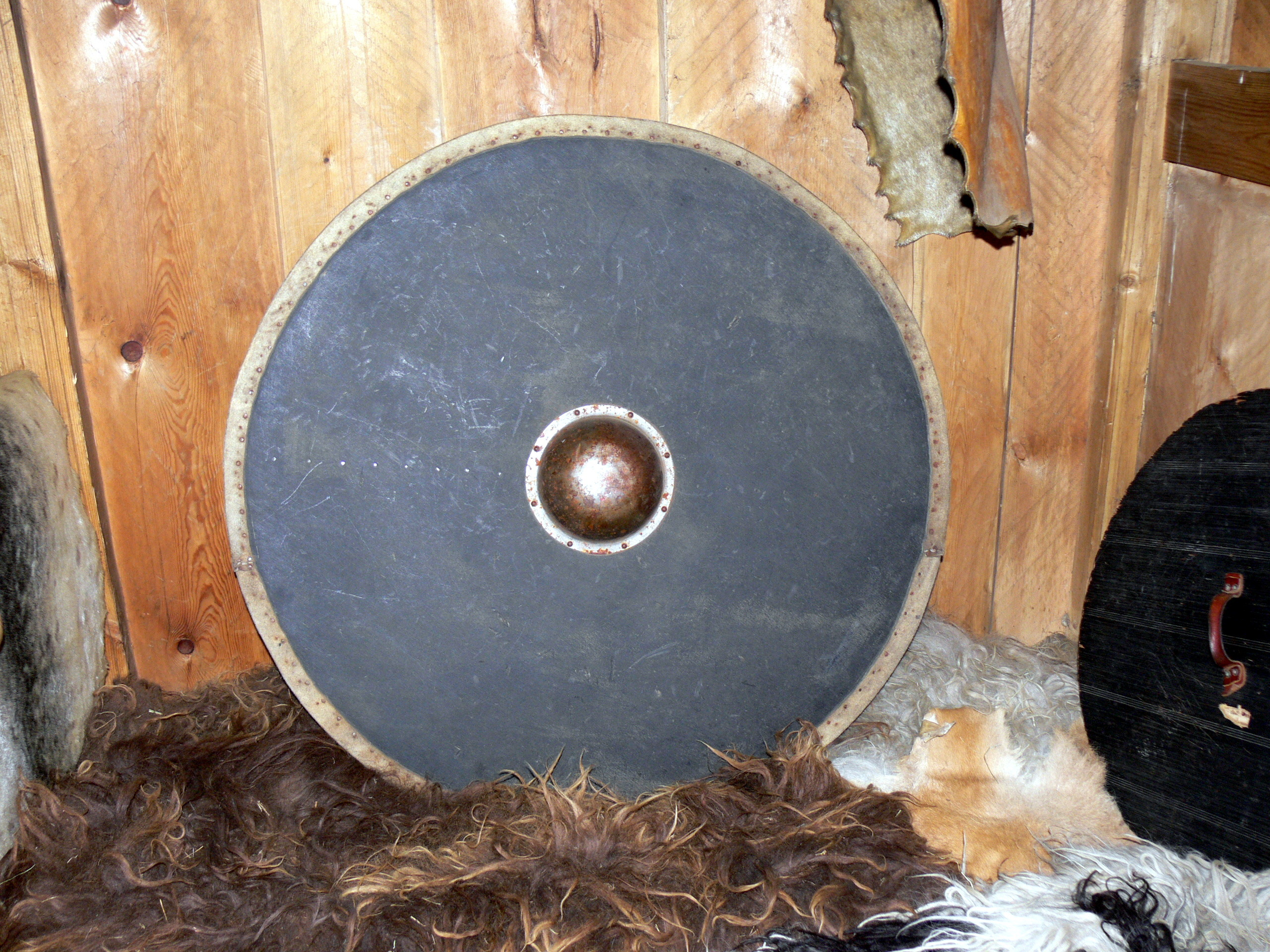
A typical Viking shield in Gokstad style

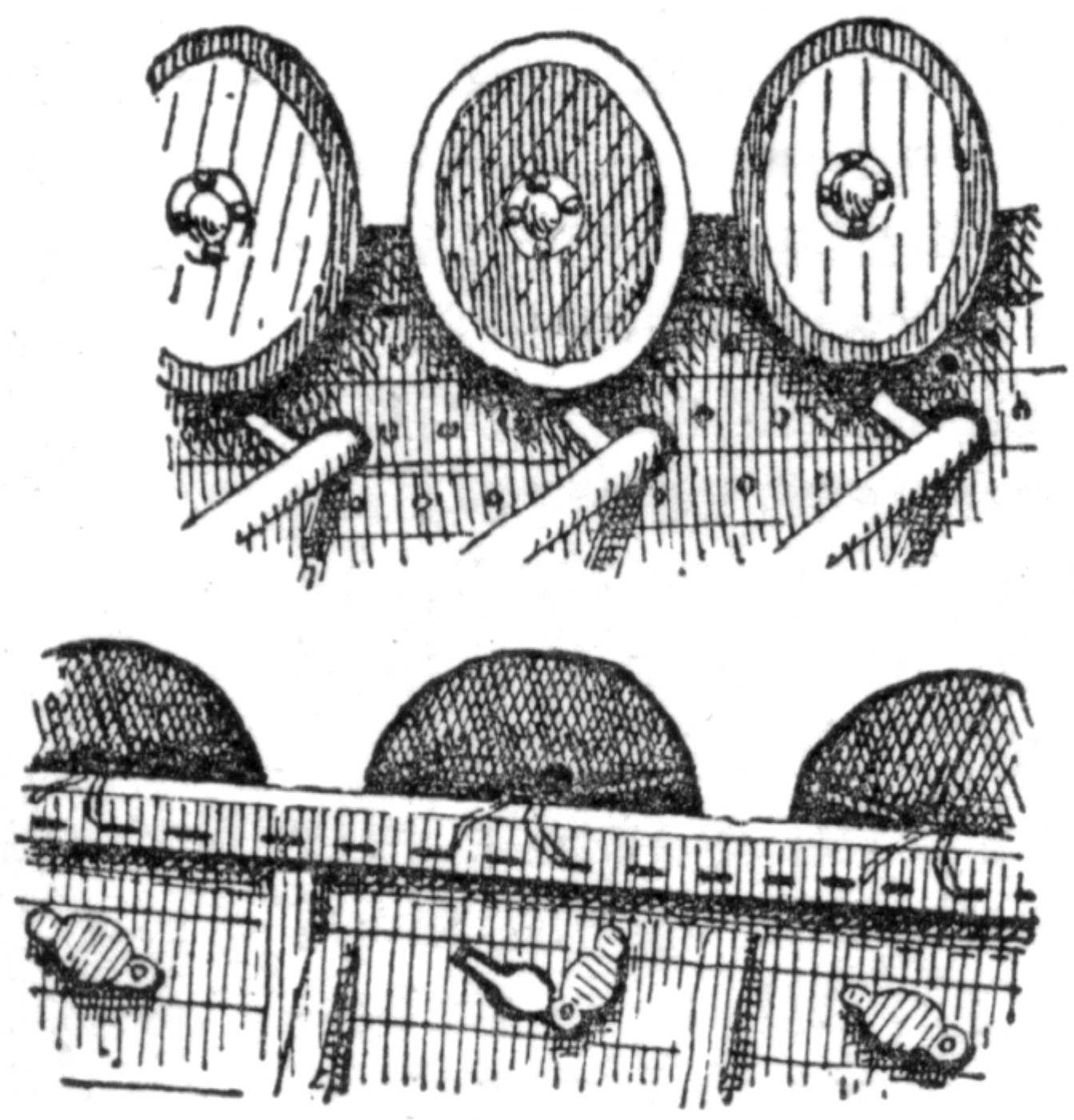
Shield mountings on the ship

The round shield was the most common means of defence. The sagas specifically mention linden wood for shield construction, although finds from graves show mostly other timbers, such as fir, alder and poplar with steel or iron shield boss. These timbers are not very dense and are light in the hand. They are also not inclined to split, unlike oak. Also, the fibres of the timber bind around blades preventing the blade from cutting any deeper unless a lot more pressure is applied. In conjunction with stronger wood, Vikings often reinforced their shields with leather or, occasionally, iron around the rim. Round shields seem to have varied in size from around 45–120 centimetres (18–47 in) in diameter but 75–90 centimetres (30–35 in) is by far the most common.

The smaller shield sizes came from the pagan period for the Saxons and the larger sizes from the 10th and 11th centuries. Most shields are shown in illuminations as being painted a single colour although some have a design painted onto them; the most common designs are simple crosses or derivations of sun wheels or segments. The few round shields that survived have much more complicated designs painted on them and sometimes very ornate silver and gold work applied around the boss and the strap anchors.

The Gokstad ship has places for shields to be hung on its railing and the Gokstad shields have holes along the rim for fastening some sort of non-metallic rim protection. These were called shield lists and they protected ship crews from waves and the wind. Some Viking shields may have been decorated by simple patterns although some skaldic poems praising shields might indicate more elaborate decoration and archaeological evidence has supported this. In fact, there is a complete subgenre of Skaldic poetry dedicated to shields, known as "shield poems", that describe scenes painted on shields. For example, the late-9th-century skaldic poem, Ragnarsdrápa, describes some shields painted with mythological scenes.

=== Kite shields ===
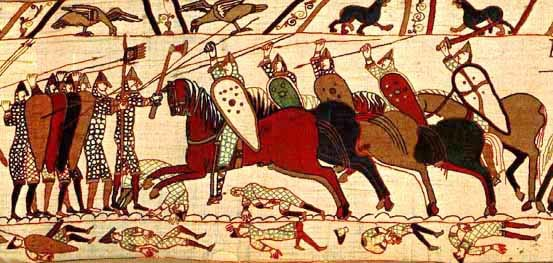
Battle scene from the Bayeux Tapestry, depicting kite shields

It has been proposed that the medieval era kite shield (also known as "long shield" or "drop shield"), favoured by the Normans, was introduced to Europe by the Norse. However, no documentation or remains of kite shields from the Viking period have been located by archaeologists, and the idea has been discarded.

It is commonly admitted that the kite shield originated in the Byzantine Empire, from where it quickly spread to Western Europe, where it was notably used by Franks. Eleventh century Normans most probably ended up using kite shield as result of their close cultural ties with Western Franks, who are also the origin of the Normans' famous nasal helmet, hauberk, and heavy cavalry tactics.

=== Shield formations ===
In battlefield situations, shields were heavily used in formations. A notable formation were shield walls, or "shield fort" (Old Norse: skjaldborg), as the Norse called such, a figurative formation, in which shield carriers would form a circle ("a fort"), or thereof, with the shields outward, probably interlocked, and thrust spears at adversaries.

Shield formations were overall flexible and adaptable. During the Viking Siege of Paris (885–886), the monk Abbo Cernuus, who was present at the siege, wrote that the Vikings advanced using a "testudo formation".

Other notable tactics included the svinfylking "boar battle formation", in which warriors would create a wedge configuration and attempt to burst through the front line of nearby foes.

== Armour ==
=== Helmet ===
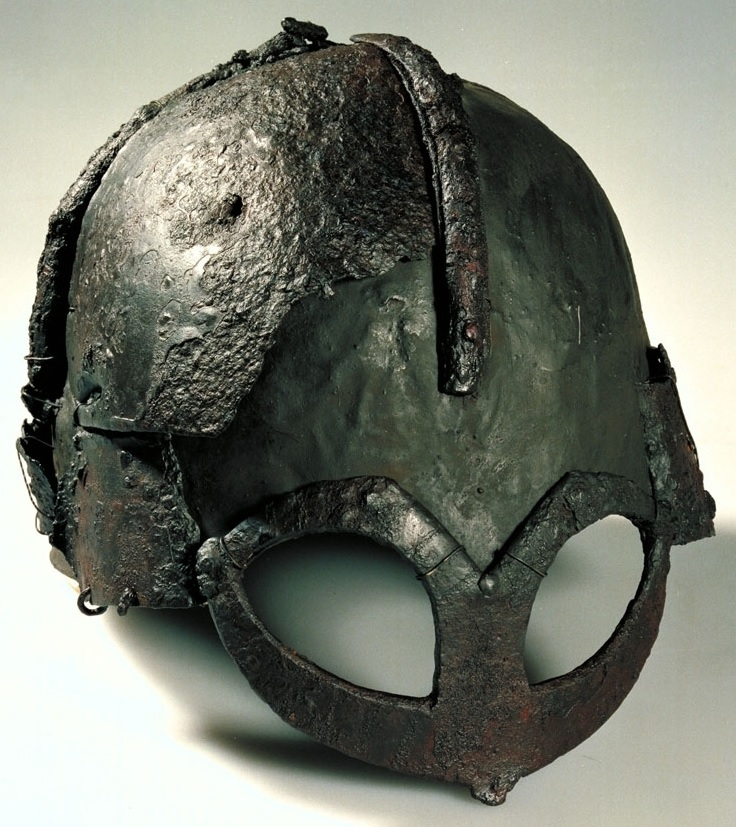
Gjermundbu helmet from 10th-century Norway

Various bits and pieces of Viking Age helmets have been found, but due to poor preservation, few are reconstructable. Some of the more known finds includes:

- the Tjele helmet fragment, found in Denmark.
- the Lokrume helmet fragment, found on the Swedish island of Gotland.
- another helmet fragment from Gotland;
- the Gevninge helmet fragment, found in Gevninge, near Lejre, Denmark.
- one fragment from Kyiv;
- the Gjermundbu helmet;
- the Yarm helmet, found in Yarm, in the North Riding of Yorkshire, England.

Of the four helmet fragments found in Scandinavia, only the remains from Gjermundbu were of use in significant reconstruction.

The Gjermundbu helmet dates to the 10th century. This helmet was made of iron from four plates after the spangenhelm pattern. This helmet has a rounded cap, and there is evidence that it also may have had a mail aventail. It has a "spectacle" guard around the eyes and nose which formed a sort of mask, which suggests a close affinity with the earlier Vendel Period helmets.

The Yarm helmet was discovered in the 1950s by workmen digging pipe trenches in Chapel Yard, Yarm, near the River Tees. Research led by Chris Caple of Durham University, and published in 2020, established that the helmet dates to the 10th century. This helmet is made of iron bands and plates, riveted together, with a simple knop at the top. Below the brow band it has a "spectacle" guard around the eyes and nose forming a sort of mask, which suggests an affinity with earlier Vendel Period helmets. The lower edge of the brow band is pierced with circular holes, where a mail curtain (or aventail) may have been attached.

From runestones and other illustrations, it is known that the Vikings also wore simpler helmets, often caps with a simple noseguard. Research indicates that Vikings may have only rarely used metal helmets. Helmets with metal horns, presumably for ceremonial use, are known from the Nordic Bronze Age, 2,000 years prior to the Viking Age.

Despite popular culture, there is no evidence that Vikings used horned helmets in battle as such horns would be impractical in a melee, but it is possible that horned head dresses were used in ritual contexts. The horned and winged helmets associated with the Vikings in popular mythology were the invention of 19th-century Romanticism. The horned helmet may have been introduced in Richard Wagner's Ring operas (set in Germany): The male chorus wore horned helmets, while the other characters had winged helmets.

=== Chain - mail ===
Once again, a single fragmented but possibly complete mail shirt has been excavated in Scandinavia, from the same site as the helmet—Gjermundbu in Haugsbygd. Scandinavian Viking Age burial customs seems to not favour burial with helmet or mail armour, in contrast to earlier extensive armour burials in Sweden Valsgärde or possibly only a small amount of Vikings could afford it. Probably worn over thick clothing, a mail shirt protected the wearer from being cut, but offered little protection from blunt trauma and stabbing attacks from a sharp point such as that of a spear. The difficulty of obtaining mail armour resided in the fact that it required thousands of interlinked iron rings, each one of which had to be individually riveted together by hand. As a result, mail was very expensive in early medieval Europe, and would likely have been worn by men of status and wealth.

Hjortspring boat contained several incomplete suits of mail.

The mail worn by Vikings was almost certainly the "four-on-one" type, where four solid (punched or riveted) rings are connected by a single riveted ring. Mail of this type is known as a byrnie from Old Norse brynja. Given scarcity of archeological evidence for Viking armor and the fact that Vikings on a raid tried to avoid pitched battles, it's possible that mail was primarily worn only by the professional warriors going into battle, such as the Great Heathen Army of the mid-9th century in England or at Harald Hardrada's invasion of Northumbria at the Battle of Fulford in 1066, and wealthy nobles.

=== Lamellar ===
More than 30 lamellae (individual plates for lamellar armour) were found in Birka, Sweden, in 1877, 1934 and 1998–2000. They were dated to the same approximate period as the Gjermundbu mailshirt (900‒950) and may be evidence that some Vikings wore this armour, which is a series of small iron plates laced together or sewed to a stout fabric or leather cats shirt. There is considerable debate however as to whether the lamellae in question were in the possession of a Scandinavian resident or a foreign mercenary.

=== Cloth and leather ===
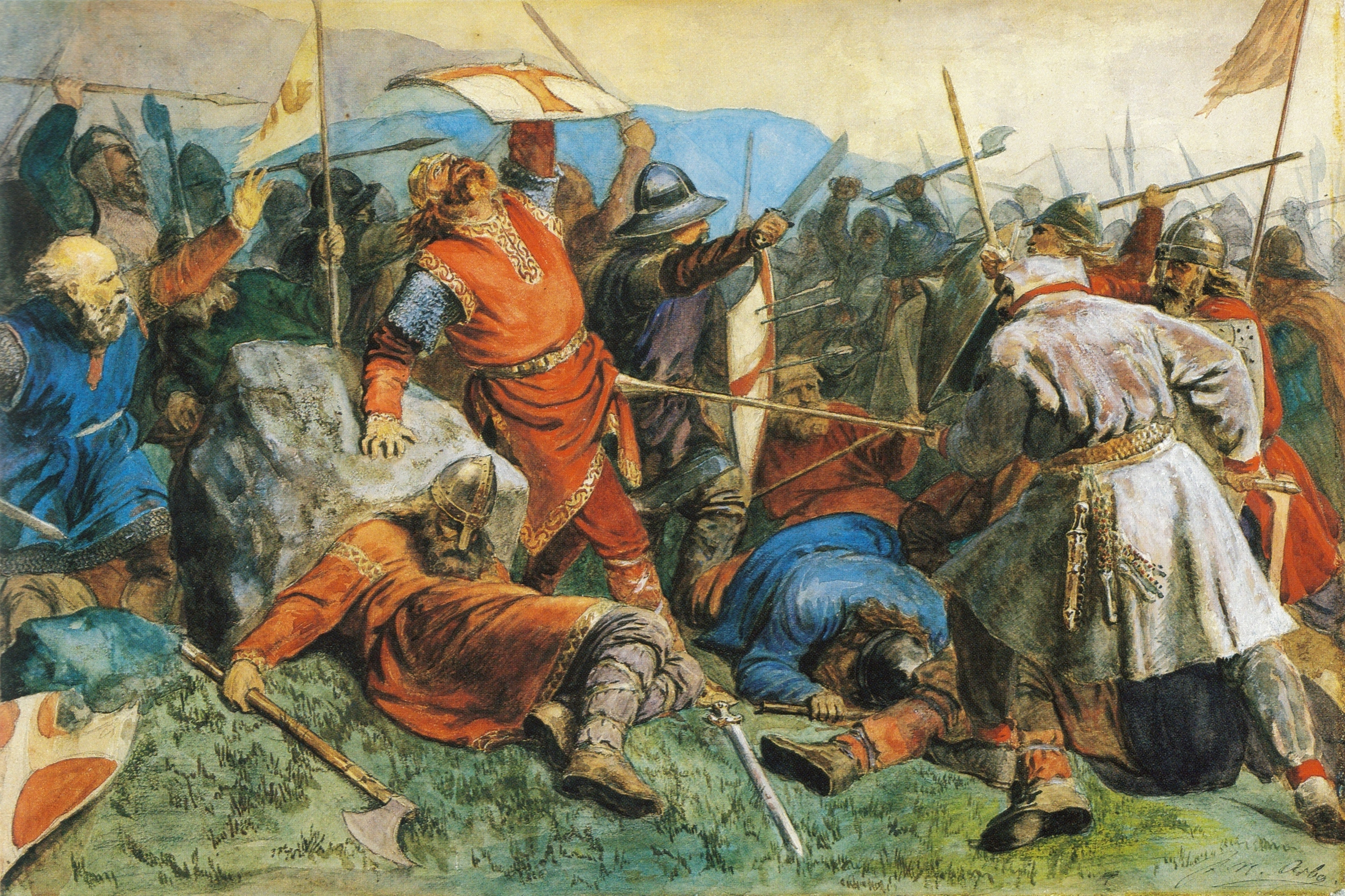
Thorir Hund dressed in a reindeer-hide tunic kills King Olaf at the Battle of Stiklestad

Quilted cloth (a gambeson) is conjectured as possible options for lower-status Viking warriors, though no reference to such are known from the sagas. Such materials survive poorly in graves, and no archaeological finds have been made. Some runestones depict what appears to be armour which is likely not chain mail. The armour in question may have been the lamellar armour mentioned above, or may not have been armour at all. Several layers of stout linen or hemp canvas would provide a good level of protection, at reasonable expense, as would winter clothing made from thick woollen cloth. Practical experience with maille also suggests an undergarment of some sort would have been worn between the maille and the regular tunic, to protect the latter from dirt and excessive wear, but the descriptions of the effect of axes in the Sagas indicate such garments were lightly padded if at all.

Leather was far pricier during the period than today and thus less affordable for the casual warrior. In the Legendary Saga of St. Olaf, the kingsbane Thorir Hund is said to have worn a tunic made from reindeer fur, enchanted by "Finns" (Sámi), defending him from sword blows. The tunic is described as "magically" enhanced which may indicate that it may not represent a typical example of such a garment. Leather clothing does, however, occasionally turn up in archaeological finds, and would have offered some degree of protection in combat.

All in all, the case for non-metal forms of armour remains inconclusive. It is likely that the average Viking fought whilst wearing ordinary clothing, with the shield as the only form of protection.

== Foreign origins of Viking arms and armour ==
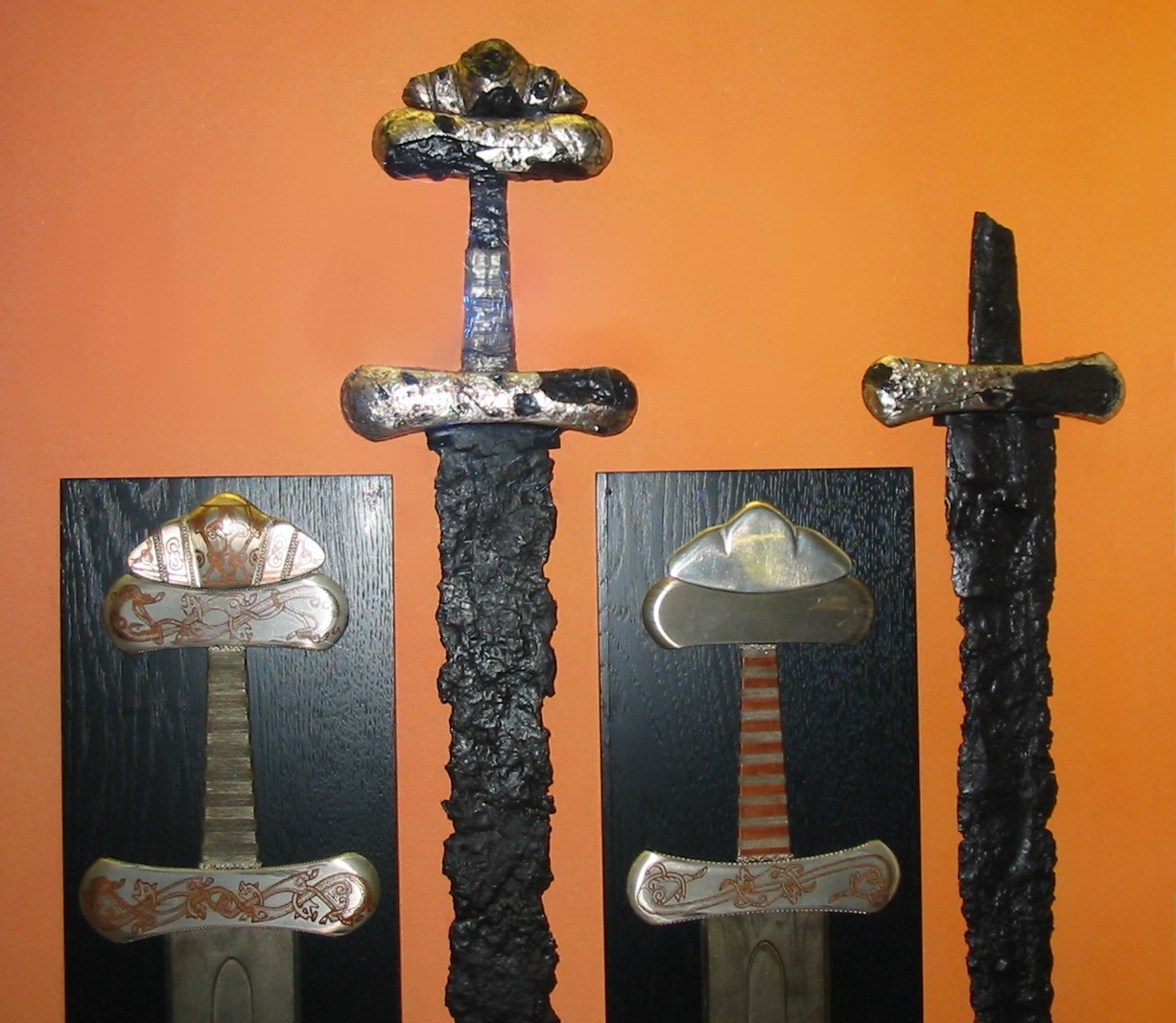
Viking swords

A number of foreign-made, specifically Frankish, weapons and armour have been found in Scandinavia. Norsemen attained them first through trade, and after Frankish bans on the sale of weapons, as plunder. Their possession and display by any individual would signify their station in the social hierarchy and any political allegiances they had.

Although local sources provided useful raw iron, e.g. free from sulfur and phosphorus, while containing manganese and nickel, during the 10th century Frankish swordsmiths developed superior steels. Frankish swords like the VLFBERHT had a higher carbon content, making them more durable, and their design was much more manoeuvrable compared to Scandinavian made swords. Although smaller weapons like daggers, knives, and arrowheads could be manufactured in Scandinavia, the best swords and spearheads were undoubtedly imported. Nevertheless, of the more than 3000 Viking swords found in Norway alone, only some 170 swords are of undisputed Frankish origin. (ref TP)

Many of the most important Viking weapons were highly ornate—decorated lavishly with gold and silver. Weapons adorned as such served large religious and social functions. These precious metals were not produced in Scandinavia and they too would have been imported. Once in Scandinavia, the precious metals would have been inlaid in the pommels and blades of weapons creating geometric patterns, depictions of animals, and (later) Christian symbols.

Vikings also used foreign armour. According to Heimskringla, one hundred Vikings appeared "in coats of ring-mail, and in foreign helmets" at the Battle of Nesjar in 1016.

During the mid-9th century, there was an influx of these high-quality weapons into Scandinavia, and Frankish arms became the standard for all Vikings. As Ahmad ibn Fadlan observed in his account of his journey to Russia, every Viking carried a "sword of the Frankish type". The Franks attempted to limit the Vikings' use of weapons and armour produced in Francia—fearing that they would eventually face equally armed opponents. Chapter 10 of the Capitulare Bononiense of 811 made it illegal for any clerical functionary to supply swords or armour to non-Frankish individuals. Laws like this were enacted throughout Francia. Ultimately, in 864, King Charles the Bald of West Francia made the practice punishable by death.

Scholars such as Valerie Dawn Hampton have proposed that such laws proved so effective at stemming the flow of Frankish weapons that they initiated the practice of raiding for which Vikings became notorious.

== Viking Weapon Quality and Decoration ==
Viking weapons were not only functional tools for warfare but also symbols of status and prestige as mentioned above. The quality and decoration of the Vikings weapons were integral to their value, both on the battlefield and in the context of social relationships. Weapons with elegant shapes and noble metal ornamentation not only provided their owner with an effective tool in combat but also served as valuable gifts often being exchanged to build political alliances. Well-crafted weapons were a reflection of a Viking's wealth, prestige, and social status.

=== Quality of Viking Weapons ===
A good Viking weapon was expected to meet certain practical standards, including a sharp, durable edge and optimal balance. Balance is crucial to the heft of any weapon: in swords, the centre of mass must be close to the handle, otherwise the weapon would be unwieldy when going blow for blow in battle. A sword, for instance, was prized for its flexibility and ability to maintain its sharpness and shape under stress. A blade that could easily bend in battle was known as a deigr, a term akin to the modern Norwegian word for 'dough'. The ideal sword blade was elastic and able to bend and return to its original shape without suffering a permanent bend or break. Several medieval sources, such as Svarfdæla saga and Ásmund Kæmpebanes saga, describe the ultimate test for a sword's quality: bending the point of the blade back to touch the hilt, then allowing it to spring back without sustaining any permanent deformation. This demonstrated the high value placed on elasticity and resilience in Viking weaponry.

=== Decoration and Ornamentation ===
While functionality was important, the appearance of Viking weapons was also of great meaning. Decorative elements on weapons and armour not only enhanced the visual appeal of a weapon but also gave it symbolic meanings representing power and the owner's status. As mentioned above, Viking shields were occasionally decorated with paintings and poetry. The commonest designs on shields were simple crosses or derivations of sun wheels or segments. Elegant designs on their weapons would sometimes feature precious metals like copper or silver as well adding a layer of artistry to their warrior identity. Weapons that had intricate patterns or engravings were seen as prestigious and were often used in diplomatic exchanges or as gifts to cement political relationships.

The technique of pattern forging was a key method used to decorate primarily swords, spears, and knives. This technique involved the forging of two, three, or sometimes four twisted iron bars, which were laid parallel to one another and then welded together. After this, the laminated blade would feature a distinctive pattern with a decorative design covering the blade's surface, including the fuller (the central groove running along the blade). Notably, the cutting edge of the blade always remained undecorated. This was to ensure that it retained its functionality while still showcasing the craftsmanship of the smith. This decorative pattern forging was typically not applied to axes, which remained more basic in design.

Pattern-forged sword blades had already been in use in Europe centuries before the Viking Age but reached their peak during this period. After the Viking Age, the widespread use of pattern forging declined, making these swords a distinctive feature of Viking weaponry. The intricacy of the patterns that were forged into their blades made these swords highly prized, and became major items of value in Viking society.

== Saga accounts ==
=== Battles ===
- Battle of Hafrsfjord
- Battle of Hastings
- Battle of Hjörungavágr
- Battle of Svolder
- Battle of Nesjar
- Battle of Stiklestad
- Battle of Remich
- Sack of Santiago de Compostela

=== Duels ===
- Kormáks saga, holmgang of Kormák and Bersi

== See also ==
- Anglo-Saxon warfare
- Gothic and Vandal warfare
- Norman invasions
- Shieldmaidens
- Viking raid warfare and tactics
- Leidang
