= Dominic Tweddle =

English archaeologist

Dominic Tweddle, FSA FSA Scot, is an English archaeologist specialising in Anglo-Saxon studies. and the former director general of the National Museum of the Royal Navy. Previously he spent time as a research assistant at the British Museum and as the assistant director of the York Archaeological Trust, where he helped develop the Jorvik Viking Centre. He is also an honorary professor at the UCL Institute of Archaeology and the University of Portsmouth.

Tweddle is known for his 1992 book on the Coppergate Helmet, which built on the work of Greta Arwidsson and Heiko Steuer to provide a typology of European helmets from the end of the Western Roman Empire to the end of the Viking Age.

== Education ==
Tweddle enrolled at Southampton University around 1972, and studied under Colin Renfrew for his first degree, a first class honours degree in archaeology and history. He then spent a year at Emmanuel College, Cambridge, where he researched Anglo-Saxon and Viking art, before enrolling at the Department of Scandinavian Studies at University College London. In 1986 he was awarded a doctorate; his Ph.D. topic was on Anglo-Saxon sculpture of South-East England. There he studied under Sir David M. Wilson, thereafter the director of the British Museum, a fact which Tweddle credits with helping him obtain his first job.

== Career ==
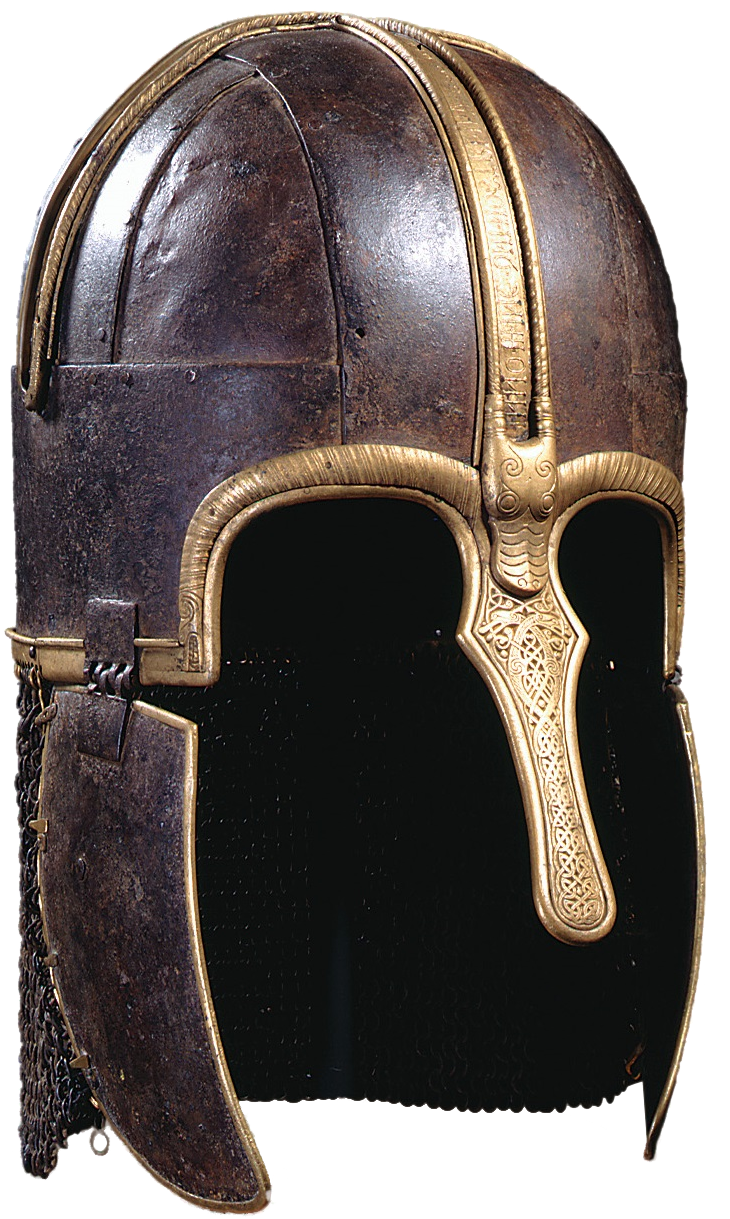
Tweddle was involved in the excavation and publication of the Coppergate Helmet.

In 1978 or 1979, while still a student, Tweddle was appointed as a research assistant in the then department of medieval and later antiquities at the British Museum. He worked there with, among others, Wilson, James Graham-Campbell and Leslie Webster. After nine months he left because, according to him, "I didn't want to spend the rest of my life in an institution, even one as nice as the BM."

From the British Museum Tweddle went to the York Archaeological Trust in 1979, where he served as assistant director. At the Trust he was responsible for research, publication and public presentation, as well as the care and curation of the collections. He was among those who led the development of the Jorvik Viking Centre in the early 1980s, and directed the creation of the Archaeological Resource Centre, a hands-on visitors' experience. He also directed the restoration and furnishing of Barley Hall, a merchant's house built around 1360.

In 1982 Tweddle was involved in the excavation of the eighth-century Anglo-Saxon Coppergate Helmet, found in York during excavations for the Jorvik Center. He served as part of the artefact research and administration team during the watching brief, and was on hand to assess and record objects as they were found. His resulting 1992 book on the helmet and associated materials, The Anglian Helmet from 16–22 Coppergate, was termed "a major piece of archaeological research" and "a definitive work of undoubted importance". The chapters "Dating" and "Discussion", in particular, were called "without doubt, the strongest and most informative parts of a book with few weak points", and built on the work of previous authors, including Heiko Steuer and Greta Arwidsson, to offer "a wide-ranging survey, from Pictland to Kiev, of post-Roman helmet types, their distributions and their dating."

Tweddle left the York Archaeological Trust in 1995, after 16 years. As the Trust had decided to concentrate on its academic mission, it sold Tweddle a design and a multimedia business for £2. Over the next 13 years Tweddle thus ran Past Forward Ltd., which provided consultancy work on the design of heritage projects, and merged it with another business to become the Continuum Group, for which he served as CEO; as described by Tweddle, "the merged business basically designed, built, owned and operated visitor attractions in the cultural field." By the time of his departure, the business had developed more than 200 cultural heritage projects and owned five visitor attractions, and had annual revenue of £9.5 million and profit of £500,000.

From January 2009 until November 2023, Tweddle served as the Director-General of the National Museum of the Royal Navy. He is also on the board of trustees of the museum ship HMS Warrior (1860), and is a visiting professor at University College London and an honorary professor of history at the University of Portsmouth. He has previously taught courses at the University of York and Durham University, and has lectured for the British Council in India, China, Poland, Hungary, Romania, Estonia, Russia and Turkey, about the development of cultural attractions.

== Publications ==
Tweddle has published five academic books, a children's book, and more than 100 academic and popular articles. Most of his publications came before 2000, as he has since then focused his time on business and museum directorship.

- Tweddle, Dominic (1978). "A Fragment of Pre-Conquest Sculpture from Balsham, Cambridgeshire" (PDF). Proceedings of the Cambridge Antiquarian Society. LXVIII. Cambridge Antiquarian Society: 17–20.
- Addyman, Peter V.; Pearson, Nicholas; Tweddle, Dominic (November 1982). "The Coppergate helmet". Antiquity. LVI (218): 189–194. doi:10.1017/S0003598X00054673. S2CID 54050677.
- Tweddle, Dominic (1983a). "The Coppergate Helmet" (PDF). Fornvännen. 78: 105–112. ISSN 0015-7813. Archived from the original (PDF) on 17 December 2021.
- Tweddle, Dominic (1983b). "The Coppergate helmet – a recent find in York". In Lamm, Jan Peder & Nordstrom, Hans-Åke (eds.). Vendel Period Studies: transactions of the Boat-Grave Symposium in Stockholm, February 2–3, 1981. Studies – The Museum of National Antiquities, Stockholm. Vol. 2. Stockholm: Statens Historiska Museum. pp. 190–191. ISBN 978-91-7192-547-3.
- Budny, Mildred; Tweddle, Dominic (December 1984). "The Maaseik embroideries". Anglo-Saxon England. 13. Cambridge University Press: 65–96. doi:10.1017/S0263675100003525. S2CID 162212931.
- Budny, Mildred; Tweddle, Dominic (September 1985). "The Early Medieval Textiles at Maaseik, Belgium". The Antiquaries Journal. LXV (2). Society of Antiquaries of London: 353–389. doi:10.1017/S0003581500027177. S2CID 162456648.
- Tweddle, Dominic (1992). The Anglian Helmet from 16–22 Coppergate. The Archaeology of York. Vol. 17/8. London: Council for British Archaeology. ISBN 1-872414-19-2. Archived from the original on 21 March 2024.

== Bibliography ==
- "Maritime Media Awards 2015". The Maritime Foundation. 2015.
- "About". HMS Warrior. Archived from the original on 20 January 2011.
- Härke, Heinrich (1993). "The Anglian Helmet from 16-22 Coppergate (Archaeology of York, XVII/8), by Dominic Tweddle (book review)" (PDF). Medieval Archaeology. XXXVII. Society for Medieval Archaeology: 320–321. doi:10.5284/1000320.
- Hole, Brian (19 December 2010). "Interview with Dominic Tweddle, Director General of the National Museum of the Royal Navy". Papers from the Institute of Archaeology. 20. University College London. doi:10.5334/pia.340.
- "Honorary Associates". UCL Institute of Archaeology. University College London. Archived from the original on 11 December 2015.
- "Meet Our Professors". University of Portsmouth.
- "Professor Dominic Tweddle". National Museum Directors' Council.
- Rynne, Etienne (March 1994). "The Archaeology of York. Volume 17, fascicule 8. The Small Finds: The Anglian Helmet from 16–22 Coppergate. By Dominic Tweddle". The Antiquaries Journal. 74. Society of Antiquaries of London: 351–353. doi:10.1017/S0003581500024598.
