= Egglescliffe =

Village and civil parish in County Durham, England

Coordinates: 54.512°N 1.350°W

- Village and civil parish
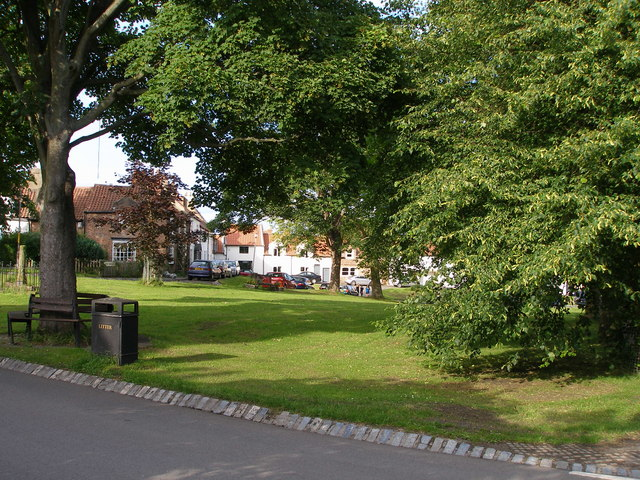
- Egglescliffe green

- Location within County Durham
- Population: 8,559 (2011)
- OS grid reference: NZ421131
- Civil parish: Egglescliffe (Egglescliffe and Eaglescliffe Parish Council)
- Unitary authority: Stockton-on-Tees
- Ceremonial county: County Durham
- Region: North East
- Country: England
- Sovereign state: United Kingdom
- Post town: STOCKTON-ON-TEES
- Postcode district: TS16
- Dialling code: 01642
- Police: Cleveland
- Fire: Cleveland
- Ambulance: North East
- UK Parliament: Stockton South

Egglescliffe is a village and civil parish in County Durham, England. Administratively it is located in the borough of Stockton-on-Tees.

The civil parish is in the Teesdale with a population of 8,559 at the 2011 Census. In the 2021 census the group of interconnected villages in the parish and Preston-on-Tees had a population of 10,250, in the larger village to small town classification. It has Egglescliffe School (secondary and sixth-form), a light industrial estate, two railway stations and golf club. Villages in the parish include Eaglescliffe, Urlay Nook, Sunningdale, Orchard and a development on the former Allens West MOD site.

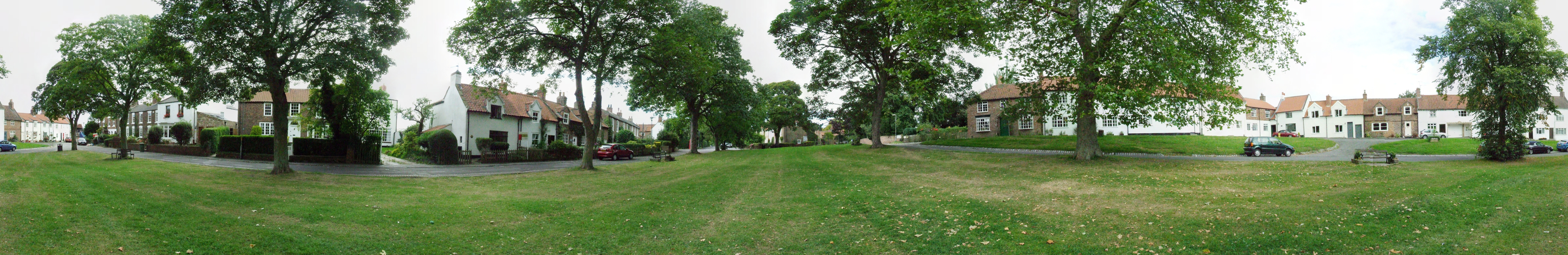
360° Panoramic of the village green

The village is on top of a hill with the River Tees at the bottom, overlooking Yarm on the other bank. It had a 2001 population of around 595, There is a Church of England primary school, small kids play area, farms, allotments and a public house (called the Pot and Glass).

== Etymology ==
Egglescliffe has been characterised by Victor Watts as "a difficult name". The name is first attested in an 1172 copy of a 1085 charter, as Eggasclif; forms containing l in the earlier part of the name, such as Egglesclif, are first attested in the 1190s, but are rarer in the Middle Ages. The second element of the name is certainly from Old English clif, "steep slope", presumably referring to the slope from Egglescliffe down to the River Tees.

The consensus among authorities in the twentieth century was that the first element came from Latin ecclesia "church" via Brittonic (where the borrowing of ecclesia is represented today by Welsh eglwys). If so, the name once meant "church-slope". However, by 2007 Victor Watts had noted that Egglescliffe is distant from other examples of more reliably attested "Eccles" names, and that the l is usually absent from the first element in medieval sources. He concluded that Egglescliffe originated with the personal name Ecgwulf, which had the nickname form Ecgi. Thus the place was routinely known both as "Ecgwulf's slope" (producing forms like Egglesclif) and as "Ecgi's slope" (producing forms like Eggasclif), until the former type eventually became dominant.

Egglescliffe gave its name to their neighbouring Eaglescliffe, whose name is simply a variant of Egglescliffe produced by folk-etymological adaptation of the unfamiliar Eggles- to the familiar Eagles-.

== History ==
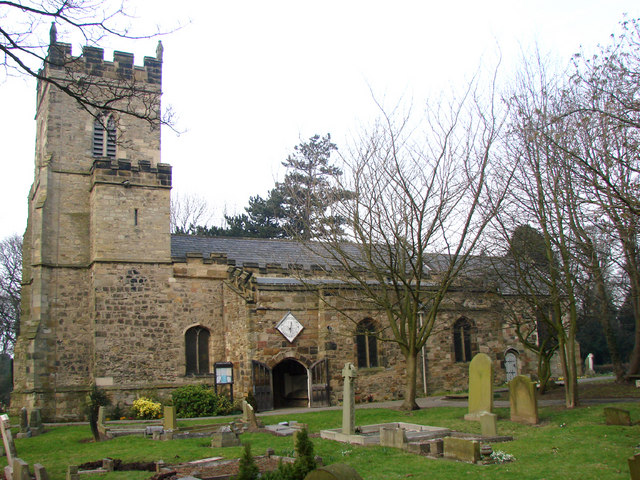
St John the Baptist Church

North of the River Tees was not recorded in the Domesday Book of 1086. The parish church is dedicated to St John the Baptist and there has been a place of worship on the site since the twelfth century.

Bishop Skirlaw of Durham built a stone bridge, Yarm Bridge, across the Tees in 1400 which still stands. An iron replacement was built in 1805, but it fell down in 1806.

== Governance ==
It was in the palatinate of Durham (the prince-bishop of Durham's domain) from its establishment until 1836 when it became a standard type of county. 1974 reforms lead to Egglescliffe being placed under the Stockton district of Cleveland county. The district became a unitary authority in 1996 and a part of the ceremonial County Durham.

== Geography ==
A map of Eaglescliffe showing main roads, estates and Preston-on-Tees.

The parish is divided by railway lines, such as the Tees Valley line and Northallerton–Eaglescliffe line. Vehicles can only get from the east to west of the parish to its far south or via the A66 road.

The parish includes the villages of Egglescliffe, Eaglescliffe, Sunningdale and Orchard. Urlay Nook and the former Allens West site are in development. There is also an industrial estate which includes the former Whitley Springs farm buildings.

The main road through eastern parish is the A135 Yarm Road which was part of the old route of the A19 until the 1970s when it was diverted east of Thornaby. The A67 runs through the west of the parish. Nearby large towns include Stockton-on-Tees (north), Middlesbrough (north east), Darlington (west) and Hartlepool (north east).

== Gallery ==
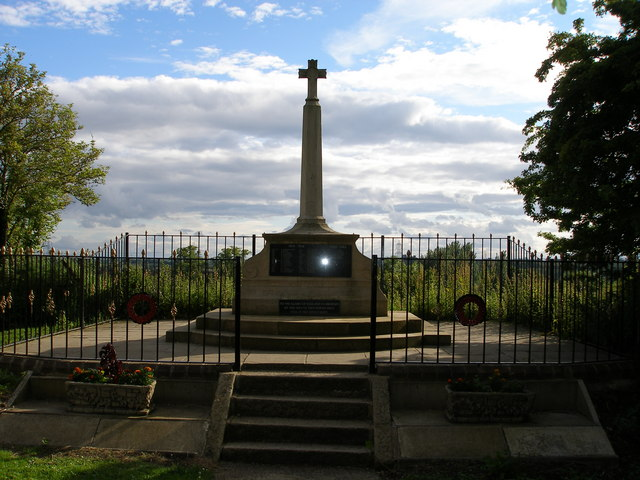
War memorial

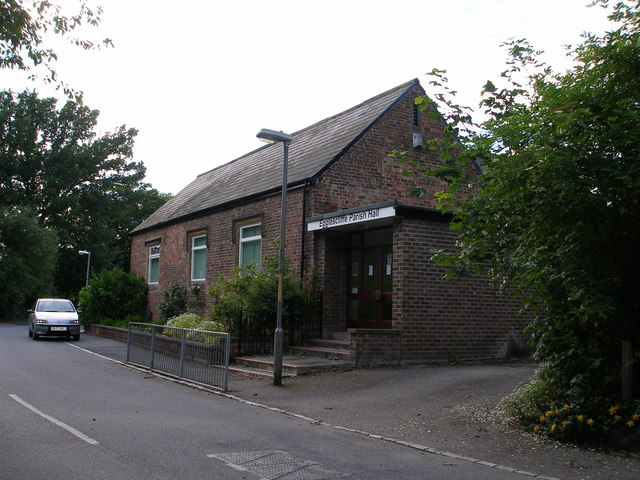
Parish hall

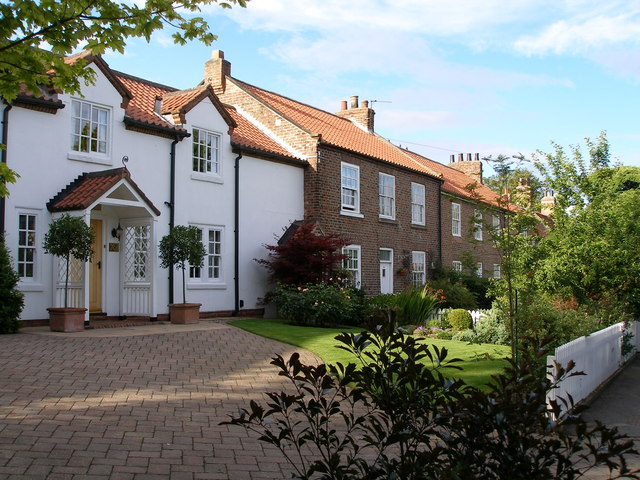
Church Road cottages

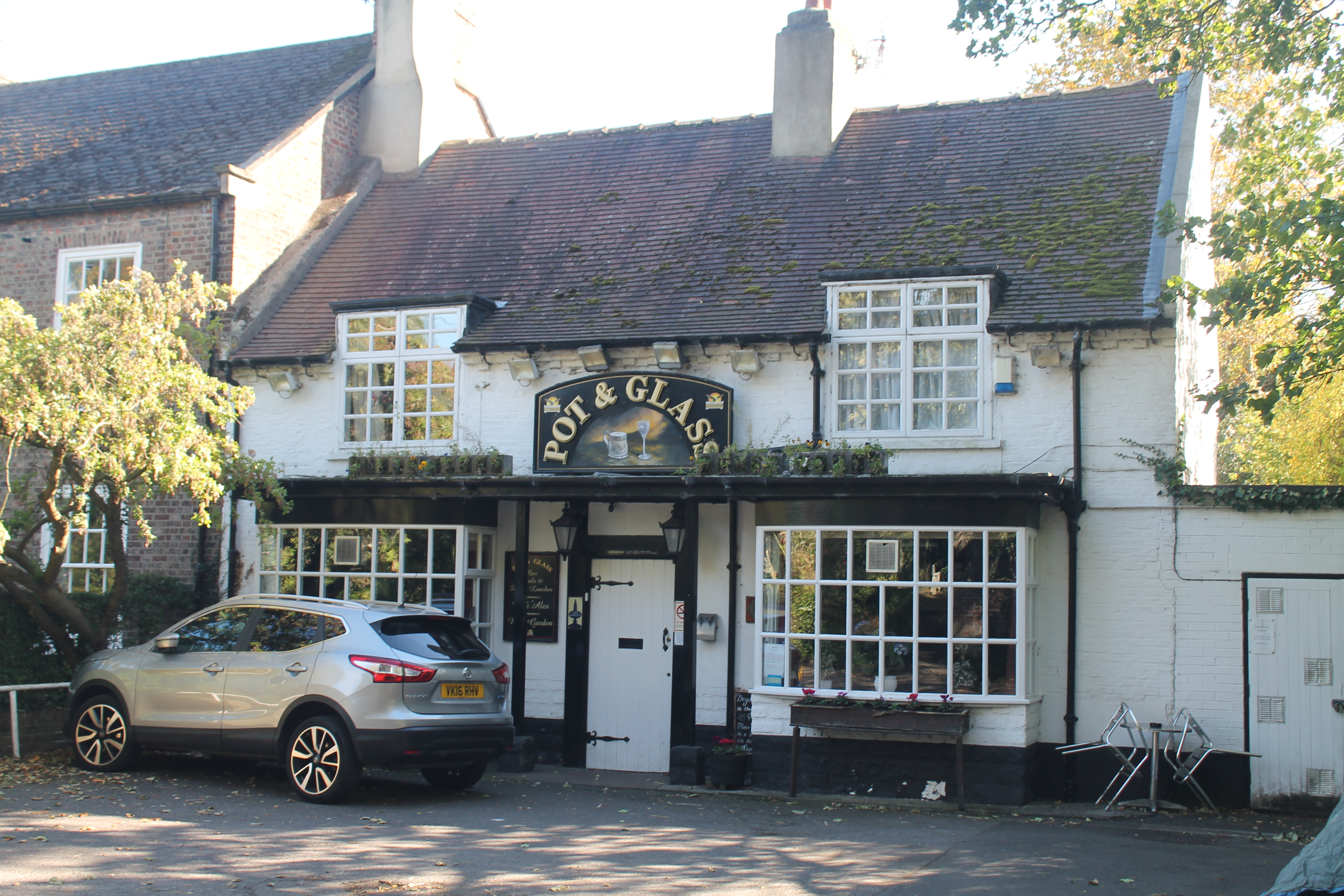
Pot & Glass public house

== See also ==
- Egglesburn
- Eggleston
