= Preston-on-Tees =

Village and civil parish in County Durham, England

Coordinates: 54.53304°N 1.34549°W

Preston-on-Tees: Preston
- Village and civil parish
- Location within County Durham
- Population: 1,689 (2011 census)
- OS grid reference: NZ421156
- Civil parish: Preston-on-Tees (Preston Parish Council)
- Unitary authority: Stockton-on-Tees
- Ceremonial county: County Durham
- Region: North East
- Country: England
- Sovereign state: United Kingdom
- Post town: STOCKTON-ON-TEES
- Postcode district: TS16, TS18
- Police: Cleveland
- Fire: Cleveland
- Ambulance: North East
- Website: www.prestonparishcouncil.co.uk

Preston-on-Tees, locally called Preston, is a village and civil parish in the borough of Stockton-on-Tees, County Durham, England. The civil parish population at the 2011 census was 1,689. It is home to Preston Hall and its accompanying public park.

In the 2011 census, the village was included as a part of Yarm, being on Yarm Road and in a continuous built-up area down to Yarm High Street.

== Governance ==
The parish originated as a township within the larger Stockton-on-Tees parish. It became a separate civil parish in 1866. It was included in the Stockton poor law union and then the Stockton rural sanitary district until both were abolished in 1894 when the new Stockton Rural District was established.

In 1968 Preston-on-Tees became a part of the county borough of Teesside. It later became part of the non-metropolitan district of Stockton-on-Tees in 1974 under the Local Government Act 1972.

== Demographics ==
According to the 2001 census, it had a population of 1,748. It has a diverse number of property types, ranging from terraced rented houses to large detached private dwellings.

== Education ==
Preston-on-Tees has one school, Eaglescliffe Junction School built in 1907. This later became known as Preston Primary School. The parish is also in the catchment for Egglescliffe Secondary School.

== Religious sites ==
On Witham Avenue the Methodist church of Eaglescliffe Trinity Methodist Church and was opened in 1902. There is also a Church of England parish church named All Saints, which was founded in 1903 as a mission church into Preston-on-Tees from the Church of Holy Trinity, Stockton, and became the church of a parish carved out of the parishes of Holy Trinity, and of St John the Baptist, Egglescliffe, in 1924.
