= Aislaby, County Durham =

Aislaby
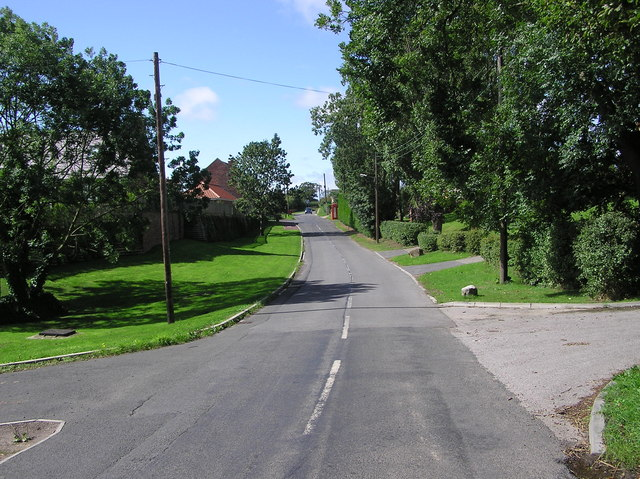
- Aislaby

- Location within County Durham
- Population: 201 (2011)
- OS grid reference: NZ404123
- Unitary authority: Stockton-on-Tees
- Ceremonial county: County Durham
- Region: North East
- Country: England
- Sovereign state: United Kingdom
- Post town: STOCKTON-ON-TEES
- Postcode district: TS16
- Dialling code: 01642
- Police: Cleveland
- Fire: Cleveland
- Ambulance: North East
- UK Parliament: Stockton West

Aislaby (/ˈeɪzəlbi/ AYZ-əl-bi) is a small village and civil parish on the north bank of the River Tees within the borough of Stockton-on-Tees and the ceremonial county of County Durham, England. It is located to the west of Eaglescliffe and Yarm.

== History ==
The name, first attested as Asulue(s)bi in 1086, is of Viking origin and means "Aslak's farm." Aislaby was listed in the Domesday Book of 1086.

== Geography ==
=== Administration ===
Aislaby is historically and ceremonially located in County Durham, but for administrative purposes is located in the Borough of Stockton-on-Tees, made a unitary authority in 1996. Before this time it was in the non-metropolitan county of Cleveland, created on 1 April 1974 under the provisions of the Local Government Act 1972.

Aislaby is in the Eaglescliffe ward. It is part of the Stockton West parliamentary constituency.

The local police force is Cleveland Police. Aislaby is in the Stockton district and its nearest police station is in Yarm.

=== Location ===
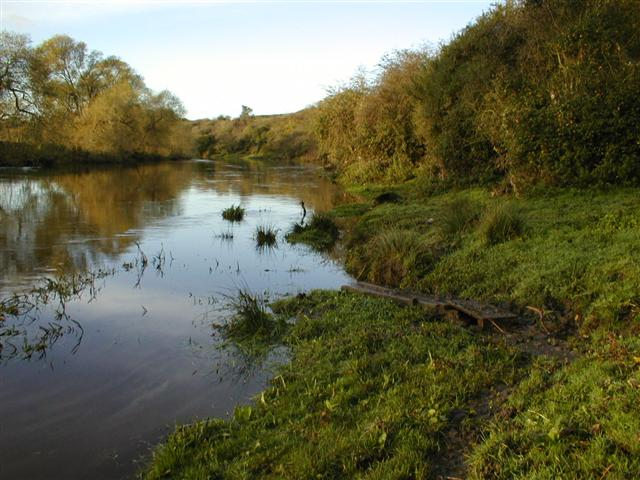
The River Tees at Aislaby

- grid reference NZ404123
- Latitude and longitude: 54°30′N 1°22′W (54.5, -1.4)
- Road access: Minor road off A67 in Egglescliffe
- Rail access: Yarm, Eaglescliffe and Allens West.
- Nearest airport: Teesside Airport

== Notable residents ==
Aislaby is home to the former Middlesbrough and England national football team manager, Steve McClaren. He bought the house that his predecessor at Middlesbrough FC, Bryan Robson, had lived in.
