= Great North Air Ambulance =

English charity air ambulance

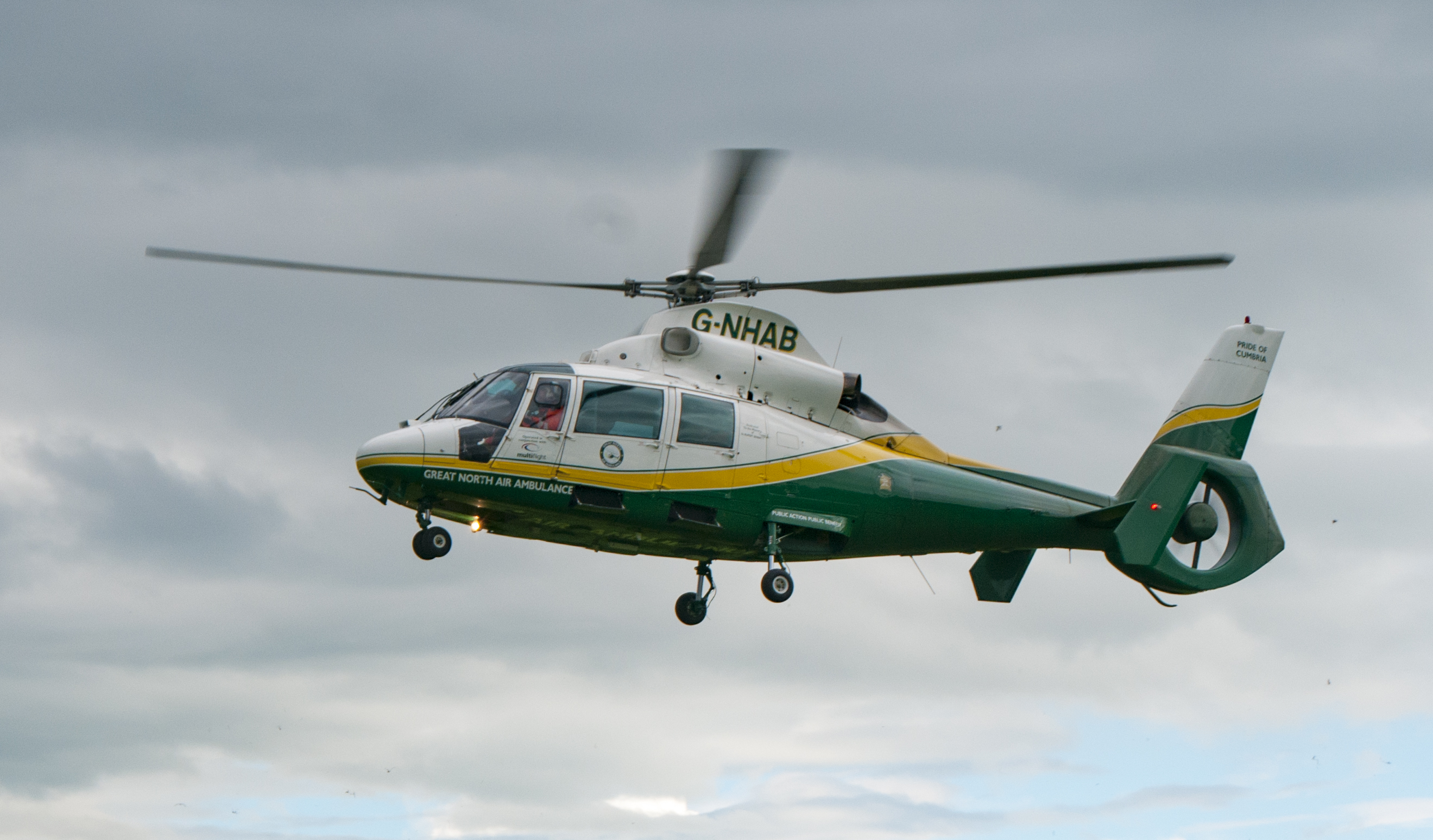
- The Pride of Cumbria aircraft (G-NHAB) based in Langwathby, near Penrith, Cumbria
- Founded: 1991
- Founder: Grahame Pickering
- Type: Air Ambulance, Charitable organisation
- Registration no.: Reg charity no: 1092204
- Location: Langwathby, Cumbria Urlay Nook, County Durham
- Region served: North Yorkshire; North East England; Cumbria; Scottish borders
- Chief Executive Officer: David Stockton
- Chair of the board: Brian Jobling
- Aircraft operated: Eurocopter AS365 Dauphin N2 & N3
- Revenue: £9.8 million (2024)
- Staff: 110 (2024)
- Volunteers: 140 (2024)
- Website: www.greatnorthairambulance.co.uk

The Great North Air Ambulance Service (GNAAS) is a registered charity and air ambulance based in the United Kingdom. It operates a dedicated helicopter emergency service for the North of England with three aircraft. It serves North Yorkshire, the North-East, Cumbria, the Scottish borders and the Isle of Man.

== Current operations ==
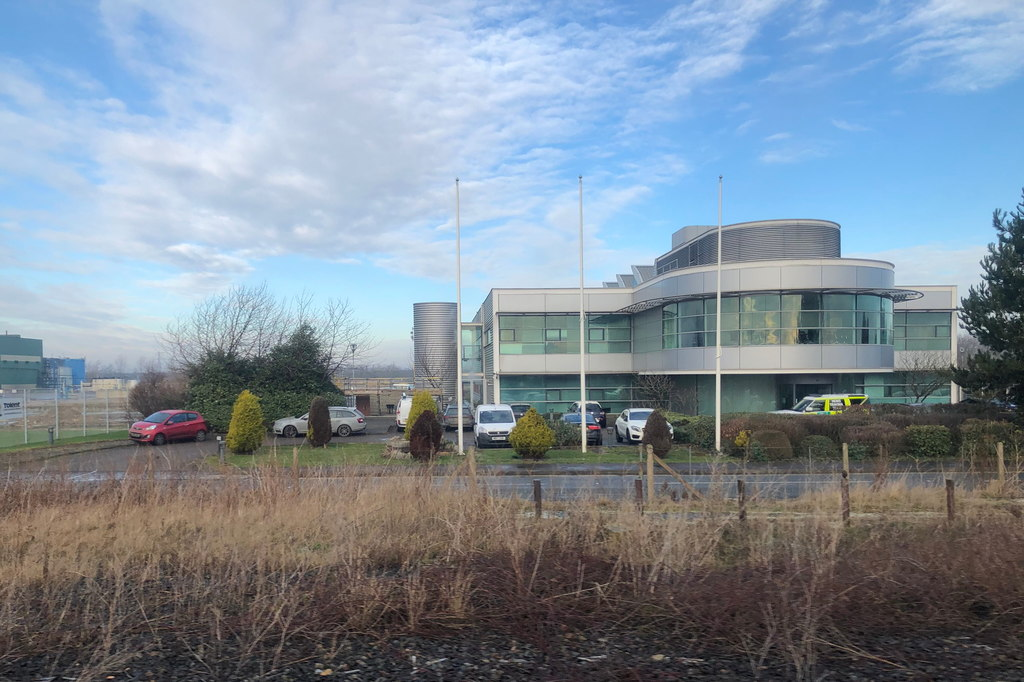
Urlay Nook site

GNAAS operates three Dauphin helicopters from its two bases at Langwathby, near Penrith in Cumbria, and Urlay Nook, near Eaglescliffe in County Durham. Between July and December 2021, the service had an average of 85 helicopter call-outs per month.

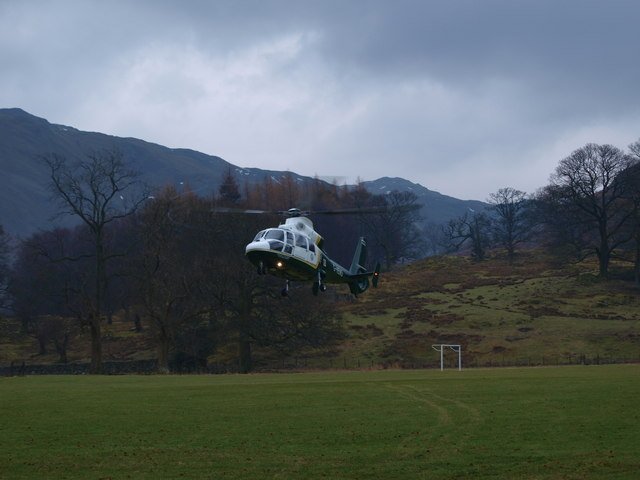
A helicopter landing in response to a call-out in Patterdale.

In hours of darkness, when the helicopters do not fly, North East Ambulance Service funds a Medical Emergency Response Incident Team (MERIT), which is staffed by a doctor and paramedic team from GNAAS. The MERIT service extended in November 2018 to cover Thursday to Sunday nights, which were previously covered on an on-call basis. The service uses Volvo XC90 vehicles.

In 2014–2015, GNAAS had operating costs of £4.6 million and an income of £6.2 million. In 2023–2024, the operating costs were £7.3 million against an income of £9.8 million, which included a total of £370,000 from government contracts and grants.

In 2020, GNAAS began trials in using jet suits to get from landed helicopters on call-outs to casualties in locations difficult to access. The simulation exercise showed a casualty, whose position it would take 25 minutes to reach on foot, could be reached in a jet suit in 90 seconds.

Current helicopters
Registration	Model	Year built	Year entered service	Nickname	Base location
G-NHAE	AS-365N-3 Dauphin 2	2007	2021	Pride of Cumbria II	Langwathby
G-NHAD	AS-365N-3+ Dauphin	2015	2020	Guardian of the North II	Urlay Nook
G-NHAC	AS-365N-2 Dauphin 2	1996	2010	None	Urlay Nook

== History ==
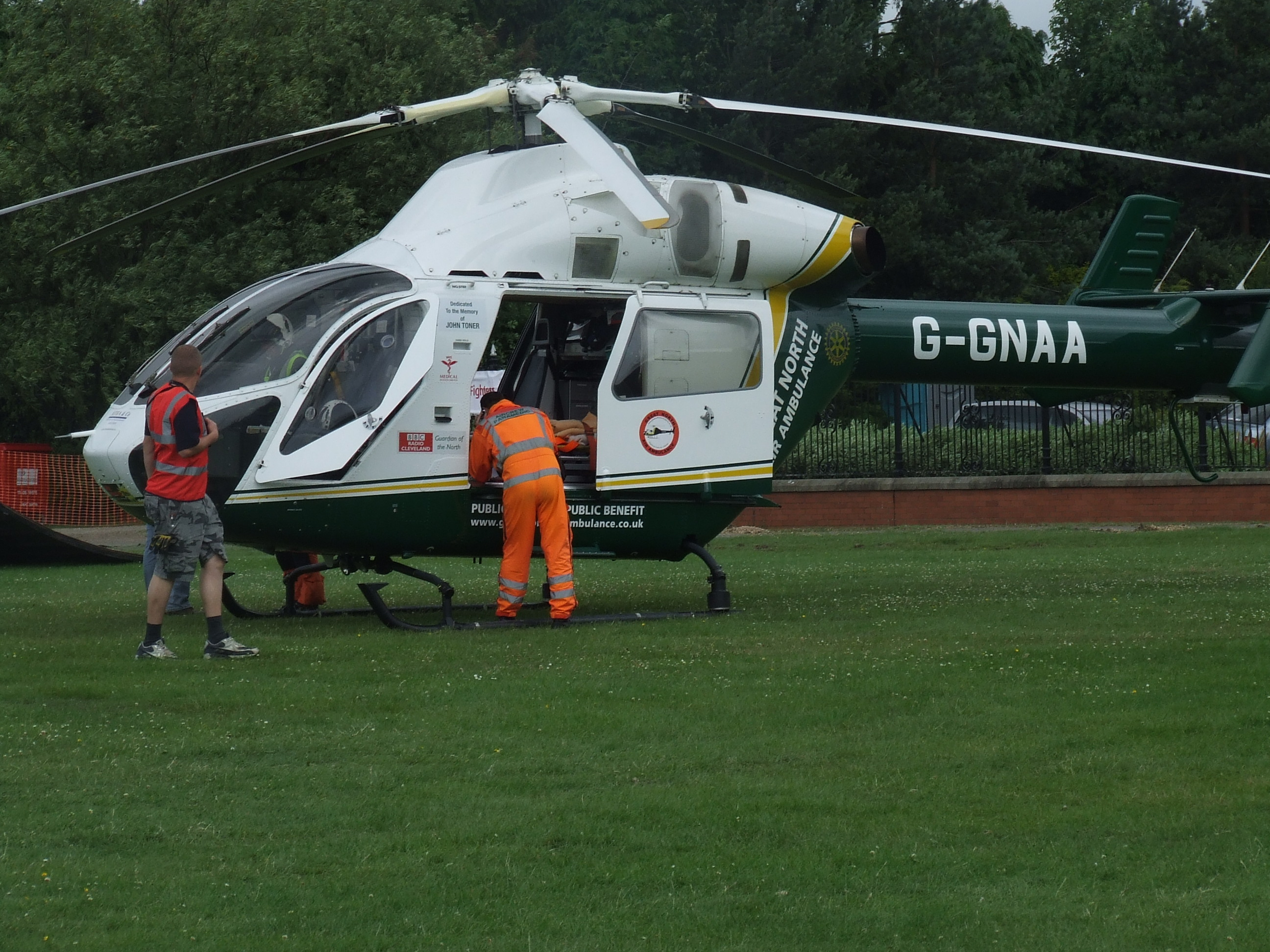
G-GNAA on a call-out in 2008.

The air ambulance service began in 1994 with the leased Eurocopter AS350 Écureuil helicopter G-NAAS. MBB Bo 105 helicopters were operated from 2003, and an MD 902 from 2006. 2006 also saw the introduction of the first Dauphin helicopter, G-HEMS. In 2010, the charity consolidated around a fleet of three Dauphin N2 helicopters, which were the first aircraft it owned. This ended the practice of leasing aircraft, which created financial issues. Two of these three Dauphin N2 helicopters were later replaced by newer Dauphin N3 helicopters G-NHAD and G-NHAE between 2019 and 2020. This was done to mitigate the risk involved with flying older aircraft.

== In the media ==
From 8 March 2018, the charity appeared on the Channel 4 TV programme Emergency Helicopter Medics, which followed the crews responding and treating emergency patients. Other air ambulances that featured in the show include Thames Valley Air Ambulance and East Anglian Air Ambulance.

== See also ==
- Air ambulances in the United Kingdom
- Emergency medical services in the United Kingdom
