= Urlay Nook =

Village in County Durham, England

Coordinates: 54.526°N 1.383°W

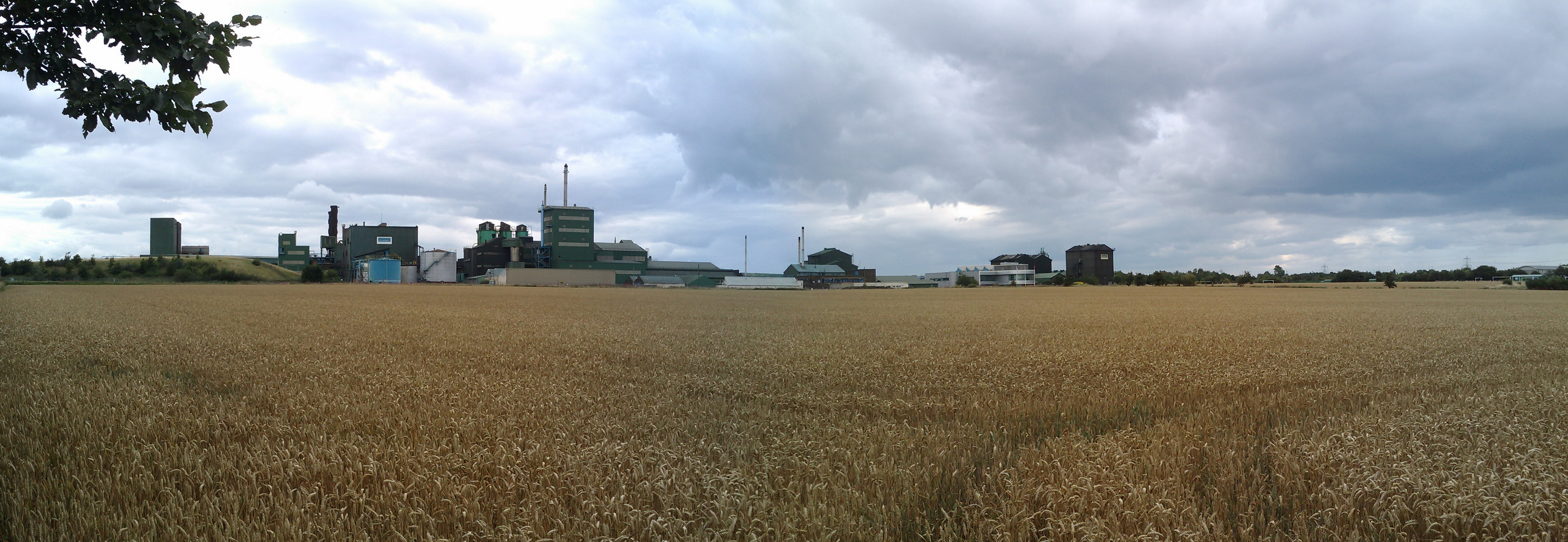
- The disused Elementis factory at Urlay Nook

- Location within County Durham
- OS grid reference: NZ400146
- Civil parish: Egglescliffe (Egglescliffe and Eaglescliffe Parish Council)
- Unitary authority: Stockton-on-Tees
- Ceremonial county: County Durham
- Region: North East
- Country: England
- Sovereign state: United Kingdom
- Post town: STOCKTON-ON-TEES
- Postcode district: TS16
- Police: Cleveland
- Fire: Cleveland
- Ambulance: North East

Urlay Nook is a village in the County Durham, England. It is part of the Egglescliffe parish in the borough of Stockton-on-Tees.

The village is dominated by the site of the former Elementis chromium chemicals plant and the Admiralty Ecology Site, both of which are owned by Elementis. In March 2011 work was underway to dismantle the chemicals plant, and by November 2011 the work was nearing completion. Urlay Nook contains the Tactical Training Centre for Durham Constabulary and Cleveland Police.

== Allens West ==
From the 1940s to the 1990s there was an Ministry of Defence (MOD) base situated at Allens West in Eaglescliffe. After the Second World War the base was Metal Reclamation Unit No 2, and was used to dismantle aircraft that were downed in the north of England.

It then became the Royal Navy Spare Parts Distribution Centre (RNSPDC), and later the Royal Navy Supply Depot (RNSD) Eaglescliffe, until its closure in January 1997 following Front Line First: The Defence Cost Study. The storage and distribution functions were transferred to Portsmouth Naval Base, and the procurement function to MOD's site at Abbey Wood, Bristol.

At its height, the depot employed more than 2,000 staff and had a significant influence on the local economy. This later reduced to around 750 just prior to closure in 1997.

Part of the former MOD site is now the Urlay Nook Admiralty ecology park, the rest of the site was sold to a distribution company in 1997. Aerial photographs show that the site used to have railway sidings and a small runway, though the latter appeared to only be in use as a relief landing ground (RLG) for RAF Thornaby.

A masterplan has been drawn up to build up to 1000 homes, a 5000 m^{2} care home, 500 m^{2} of community facilities, and up to 1000 m^{2} of retail space on the site.

== See also ==
- Aislaby, County Durham
- Preston on Tees
- Yarm
