= Eaglescliffe =

Coordinates: 54.52°N 1.35°W

- Village
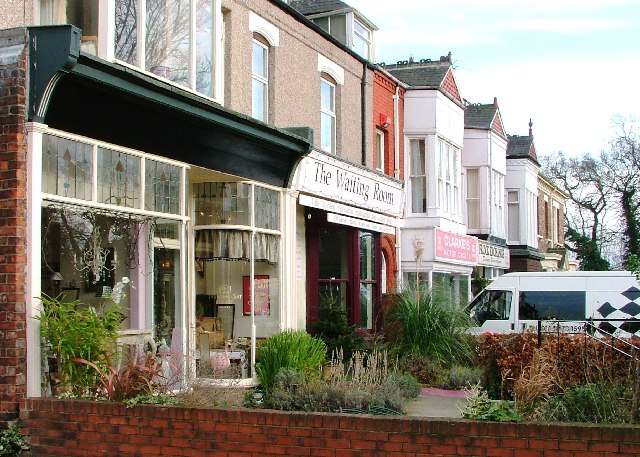
- Station Road

- Location within County Durham
- Population: 10,449 (2011.ward)
- OS grid reference: NZ421139
- Civil parish: Egglescliffe (Egglescliffe and Eaglescliffe Parish Council)
- Unitary authority: Stockton-on-Tees
- Ceremonial county: County Durham
- Region: North East
- Country: England
- Sovereign state: United Kingdom
- Post town: STOCKTON-ON-TEES
- Postcode district: TS16
- Dialling code: 01642
- Police: Cleveland
- Fire: Cleveland
- Ambulance: North East
- UK Parliament: Stockton West

Eaglescliffe is a village in the Borough of Stockton-on-Tees, County Durham, England. It is in the civil parish of Egglescliffe.

The village was formerly known as Eaglescliffe Junction, being formed around a railway station. In 2011, the Office for National Statistics had the area as Yarm's built-up area.

== History ==
The village's name is thought to be derived from a misspelling of the name of the nearby village of Egglescliffe meaning a church on a hill. A common myth on the name change is that in Victorian times the sign for the new railway station turned up incorrect after the signwriter thought that Egglescliffe was a mistake and altered it.

The Stockton and Darlington Railway passed through the grounds of Preston Hall in Eaglescliffe, and on the opening day, 27 September 1825, there was a famous race between a stagecoach travelling down Yarm Road, and the Locomotion No. 1. The Cleveland Bay pub was opened, then named the New Inn, on 17 October 1825. It was built for Thomas Meynell, the chairman of the railway company, and in September 2025 it was one of seven railway-associated buildings which were grade II listed in the week of the bicentenary of the railway. English Heritage recognise it as "potentially the earliest public house in the world to be built specifically in association with a railway line" and as a "proto-railway station".

In 2011, Eaglescliffe was named the 4th best place for families to live in England and Wales, according to the savings firm Family Investments.

== Events ==
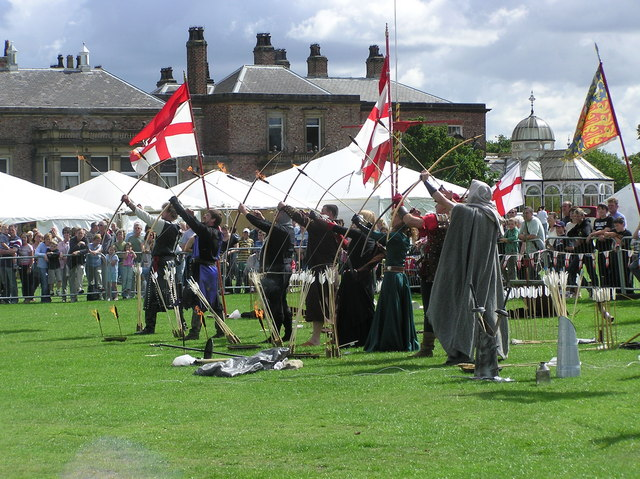
One of the events at Preston Park

Many events are held in Eaglescliffe every year, mostly in Preston Park which is situated north of the village, in Preston. Many of these events are run by Stockton Council.

Many local groups gather at the community centres and village halls within Eaglescliffe and its neighbouring villages. Egglescliffe Community Centre is the largest, and plays host to two amateur dramatics groups – Cliffe Theatre (who produce at least two plays every year), and Centre Stage (who produce a pantomime every January, as well as a musical every summer). Egglescliffe Community Centre also hosts many other community groups including a Ladies Section, a weight loss group, dance classes, and many others.

== Sport and leisure ==
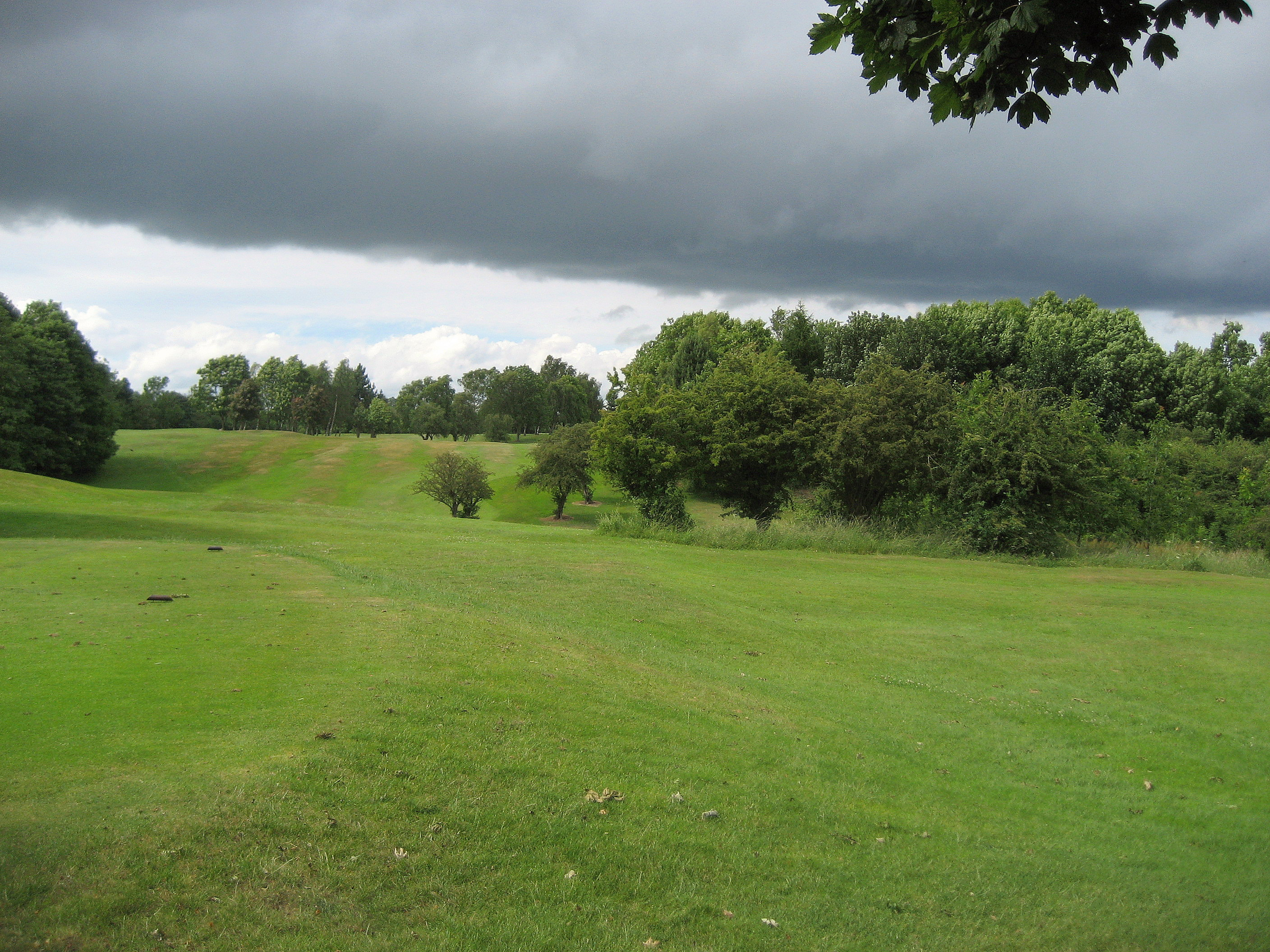
Thirteenth Fairway at the golf course

To the village's east is Eaglescliffe Golf Club – a course which occupies the land bordered to the south by the Sunningdale Estate, to the north by Teesside High School, and to the east by the River Tees. Many street names in the Sunningdale Estate, as well as the name of the local 'Links Primary School', reflect the location of this golf club. Preston Park has large playing fields.

== Education ==
Eaglescliffe has one secondary school called Egglescliffe School. This is in the east of the village and also has Egglescliffe Sixth Form College for ages 16–18. There are also four primary schools: Junction Farm, Durham Lane, The Links, and Preston. Egglescliffe village has a primary school called Egglescliffe CofE Primary School. As well as these there is also Teesside High School, an independent preparatory and high school, originally an all-girls school, it is now introducing boys within the framework of a diamond model of education.

== Economy ==
Tetley Tea have had their only tea bag factory in the western world here since 1969 on Sowerby Way. It is the largest tea bag factory in the world, on the Durham Lane Industrial Park, having a floor area of 220,000 square feet (20,000 m^{2}) and makes 18 billion tea bags a year; David Cameron and Boris Johnson have both visited the site. Warburtons have a bakery outside of the village to the north-east on the Preston Farm Industrial Estate. The Elementis Chromium site in nearby Urlay Nook closed in June 2009.

== Governance ==
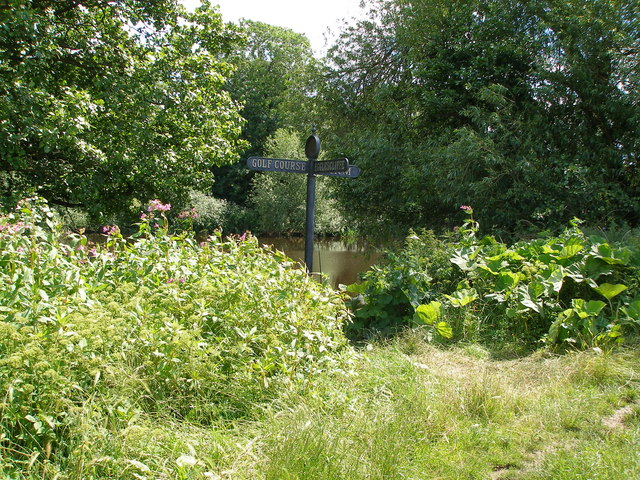
A popular walk is between Eaglescliffe Golf Course and Yarm

Eaglescliffe is part of the Stockton South parliamentary constituency which is currently represented in the House of Commons by Matt Vickers (Conservative) who won the 2019 general election by a majority of 5,260. The previous MP was Dr Paul Williams (Labour), "a local GP" (2017–2019). A previous MP is James Wharton (2010–2017) the former Conservative Minister for Northern Powerhouse. The lowest tier of local government is Egglescliffe and Eaglescliffe parish council.

== Transport ==
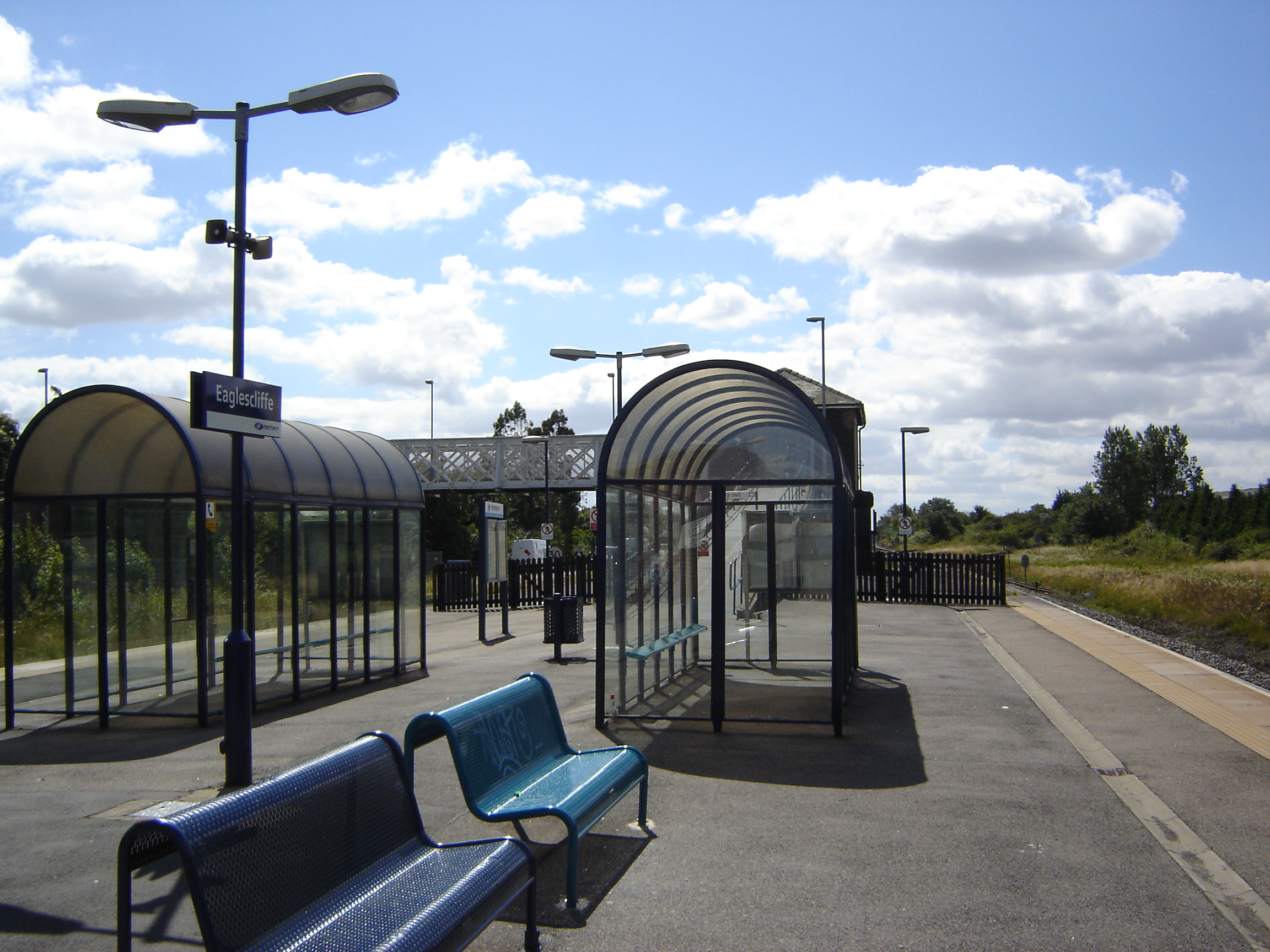
Eaglescliffe station

Eaglescliffe railway station is staffed. Grand Central operate five trains a day direct to/from London King's Cross station. Northern provide local services to Darlington, Middlesbrough, Saltburn and Sunderland. Regional destinations York and Manchester Victoria . Allens West station also serves the village. The closest airport is Teesside International Airport.

== Notable residents ==
- Matthew Bates, former professional footballer, raised and schooled in the area
- Baroness Tanni Grey-Thompson, Paralympic athlete, lives in Eaglescliffe
- Gary Havelock, speedway rider place of birth
- Frank Middlemass, actor
- Sir Samuel Alexander Sadler (1842–1911), industrialist, mayor and MP for Middlesbrough resided in Eaglescliffe
- James Wharton, former MP for Stockton South
