= Pocket Sergeant =

Mobile application for UK police officers

Pocket Sergeant is a mobile application developed in 2014 by Paul Cooper, a Cleveland Police officer at the time. The app was developed for Apple iOS and Android operating systems. Pocket Sergeant provides up-to-date information for police officers and staff without the requirement for a data connection. The app has been recognised throughout the United Kingdom at various digital awards ceremonies. Pocket Sergeant is highly popular within the criminal justice system and widely used by police officers across the UK. Pocket Sergeant has also been featured in Police Hour.

== Development ==
PC Paul Cooper was part of a Response/Patrol Team at Lincolnshire Police. He saw a gap in the market for an app to help save time for officers on the go, as well as a study aid for people interested in the job and criminal law. Cooper left the police service in 2016 to focus on the mobile app.

== Awards ==
Pocket Sergeant was a Gold award winner in the mobile app category at Cambridgeshire Digital Awards 2016, and a Silver award winner at the same awards in 2015. Pocket Sergeant was shortlisted in 2016 for the Digital Innovation in the Public Sector and Digital Startup of the Year categories. The app won the Digital Awards Champions 2017 in the Mobile App category. This was a public-voted contest between all Gold award winners from the Digital Awards schemes across Cambridgeshire, Essex, Hertfordshire, Kent, Milton Keynes and Surrey in 2016. The app won Startup of the Year and app creator, Paul Cooper won Entrepreneur of the Year at the Lincolnshire Digital and Tech Awards 2017 Pocket Sergeant went on to win the Business Innovation category at the Mercury Awards in September 2019.
