= Cheer (disambiguation) =

Cheer refers to the act of cheering.

Cheer may also refer to:

- Cheer (brand), laundry detergent brand
- Cheer (cheese), cheese brand
- Cheer (TV series), American docuseries
- Cheer Chen (born 1975), singer-songwriter
- Jacqui Cheer, British police officer
- Margaret Cheer, American actress
- Ursula Cheer, New Zealand academic

== See also ==
- Cheers (disambiguation)
- Cheerleading, also referred to as cheer
