= North East Air Support Unit =

The North East Air Support Unit was the main aerial support for police forces in north east England. It has since been replaced by the National Police Air Service, which provides borderless police aviation support across England and Wales.

== History ==
The North East Air Support Unit was formed in 1995 by joint venture of Cleveland, Durham and Northumbria police forces. Before this, Durham and Cleveland contracted in Air support from Northumbria.

In 2007, the Northumbria and Durham forces proposed reducing the size of the unit to one aircraft, to be based at Newcastle. Cleveland vetoed this move, and as a result Northumbria and Durham announced their intention to withdraw from the consortium with effect from 1 April 2009.

On 1 April 2009, a new North East Air Support Unit was formed serving the Durham and Northumbria forces using an aircraft to be based at Newcastle Airport. The Cleveland Air Operations Unit was established on that date serving Cleveland Police.

== Fleet ==
The North East Air Support Unit had one helicopter:

- Eurocopter EC135 registration G-NEAU. The aircraft was received in 2004 and iwas currently based at Newcastle Airport. Its call sign was "India 99"

The unit's former fleet included:

- Eurocopter AS355 Écureuil 2, registration G-PASF. Based at Newcastle Airport and was the North East Air Support Unit first aircraft. It was replaced in 1999 by G-NESV.
- Britten-Norman Islander, registration G-NESU. Bought in 1995 when the consortium of three North East forces was formed. The aircraft was based at Durham Tees Valley Airport. It was replaced in 2005 by the second helicopter.
- Eurocopter EC135, registration G-NESV. This aircraft was brought in 1999 and was based at Newcastle Airport, but moved to Durham Tees Valley when Cleveland Police funded their own aircraft.

== See also ==
- Police aviation
- Police aviation in the United Kingdom
