= A135 =

A135, A.135 or A-135 may refer to:

- A-135 anti-ballistic missile system, a Russian military complex deployed around Moscow to counter enemy missiles targeting the city
- A135 road (England), a road in Teesside connecting Stockton-on-Tees and Yarm
- Austin A135, a 1947 British luxury car
- RFA Argus (A135), a 1984 Royal Fleet Auxiliary aviation training ship
