= Yarm helmet =

10th-century Viking age helmet

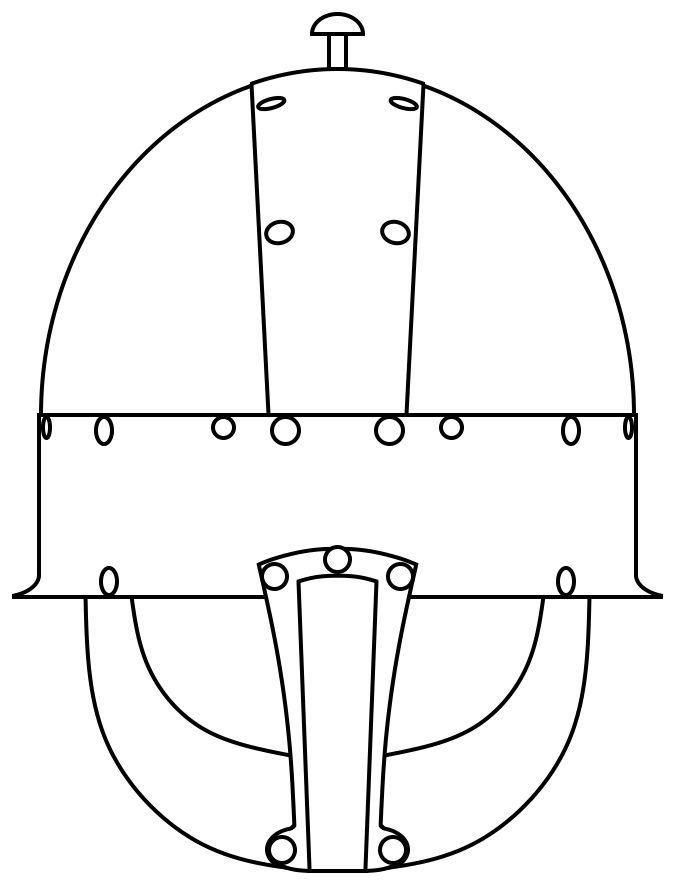
- Drawing of the Yarm helmet in undamaged condition, without hypothetical aventail
- Material: Iron
- Discovered: 1950s Yarm, near Stockton-on-Tees, England
- Present location: Preston Park Museum

The Yarm helmet is a circa 10th-century Viking Age Anglo-Scandinavian helmet that was found in Yarm in the North Riding of Yorkshire, England. It is the first relatively complete Anglo-Scandinavian helmet found in Britain and only the second relatively complete/intact Viking age helmet discovered in north-west Europe.

The helmet was discovered in the 1950s by workmen digging pipe trenches in Chapel Yard, Yarm, near the River Tees. Research led by Chris Caple of Durham University, and published in 2020, established that the helmet dates to the 10th century. It's also likely the helmet is dated from before the Viking Age, based on comparison with helmets from the Migration Era.

It is on display at the Preston Park Museum in Stockton-on-Tees. It is on loan from Yarm Town Council.

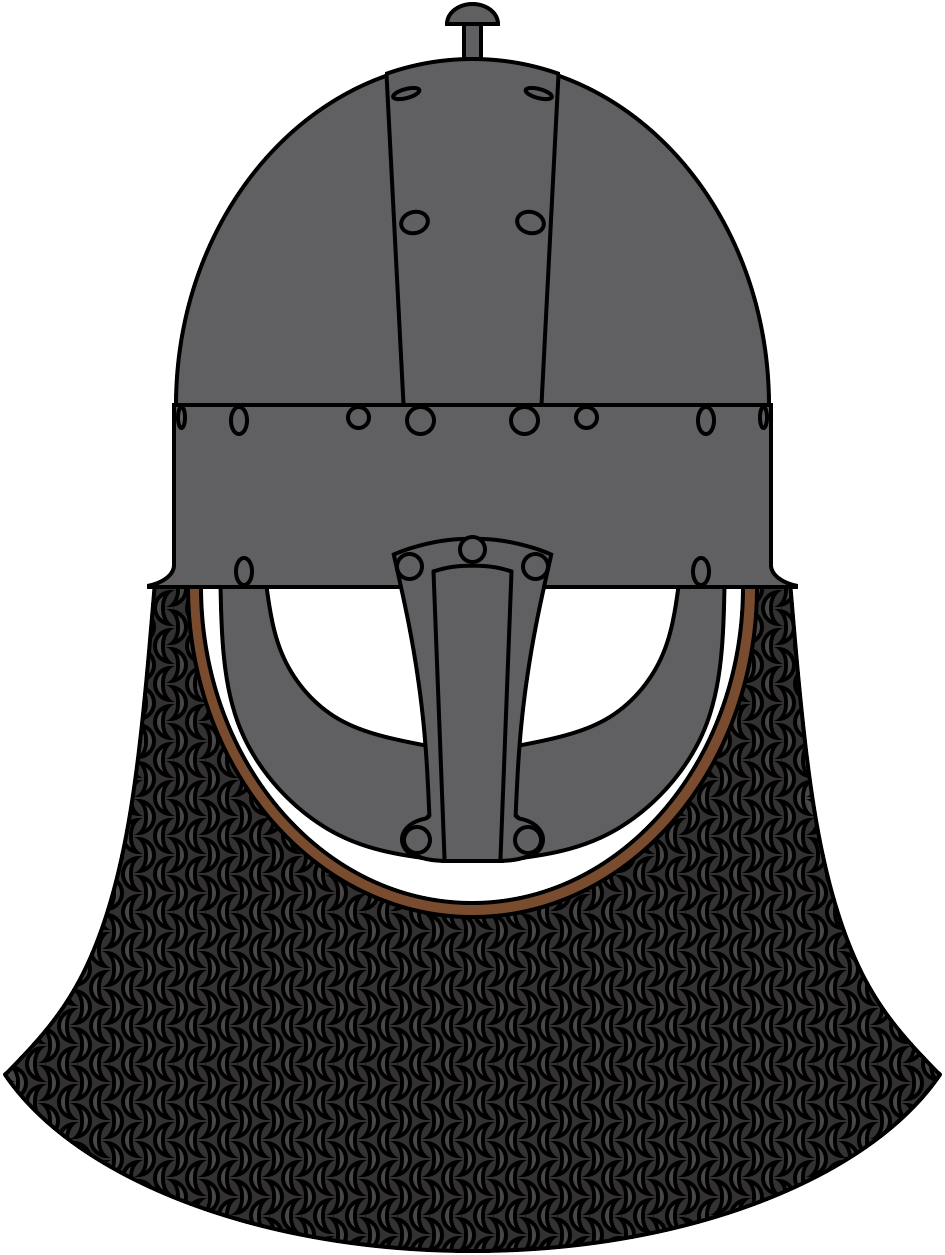
Yarm helmet drawing with a hypothetical enclosed aventail with loose front

The iron helmet is made of bands and plates, riveted together, with a simple knop at the top. Below the brow band it has a "spectacle mask", a guard around the eyes and nose forming a sort of visor, which suggests an affinity with earlier Vendel Period helmets. The lower edge of the brow band is pierced with circular holes, where a mail curtain or aventail may have been attached.

The only other near-complete Viking helmet is the Gjermundbu helmet in Norway. Other helmet remains exist, such as the Tjele helmet fragment from Denmark, the Lokrume helmet fragment from Sweden, and a fragment from Kyiv.

== Bibliography ==
- Caple, Chris (2 July 2020). "The Yarm Helmet" (PDF). Medieval Archaeology. 64: 31–64. doi:10.1080/00766097.2020.1755126. S2CID 221055800.
- Vike, Vegard (11 September 2020). "The Viking helmet from Yarm". Museum of Cultural History. University of Oslo.
