= Cheers (disambiguation) =

Cheers is a 1982–1993 American television sitcom.

Cheers or CHEERS may also refer to:

- "Cheers", a toast given as a social drinking ritual

== Arts, entertainment, and media ==
=== Music ===
- The Cheers, an American vocal group in the 1950s

==== Albums ====
- Cheers (Obie Trice album), 2003, or its title track
- Cheers (Lee Hong-gi album), 2018
- Cheers (Jukebox the Ghost album), 2022, or its title track
- Cheers, 1959 album by Burl Ives
- Cheers, 2019 album by The Wild Reeds

==== Songs ====
- "Cheers (Drink to That)", by Rihanna, 2011
- "Cheers", by Sevendust, from All I See Is War, 2018
- "Cheers", by Sleeping with Sirens, from Gossip, 2017
- "Cheers", a 2020 song by Blackbear and Wiz Khalifa
- "CheerS", by ClariS, 2018

=== Television ===
- "Cheers" (Adventure Time: Fionna and Cake), a 2023 episode
- Cheers (Spanish TV series), a 2011 remake of the American series
- "Cheers" (The Upper Hand), a 1993 episode

== Other uses ==
- Cheers Beacon Hill, formerly the Bull & Finch Pub, a bar in Boston, Massachusetts, used for exterior shots of the sitcom bar
- Cheers (proa), a Polynesian-inspired sailboat designed by Dick Newick in 1967
- Children's Environmental Exposure Research Study (CHEERS)
- Cheers, a Singaporean convenience store chain operated by NTUC FairPrice

== See also ==
- Cheer (disambiguation)
- Cheering
