= Preston Park, Stockton-on-Tees =

Public park in county Durham, England

Preston Hall Park
- Preston Park
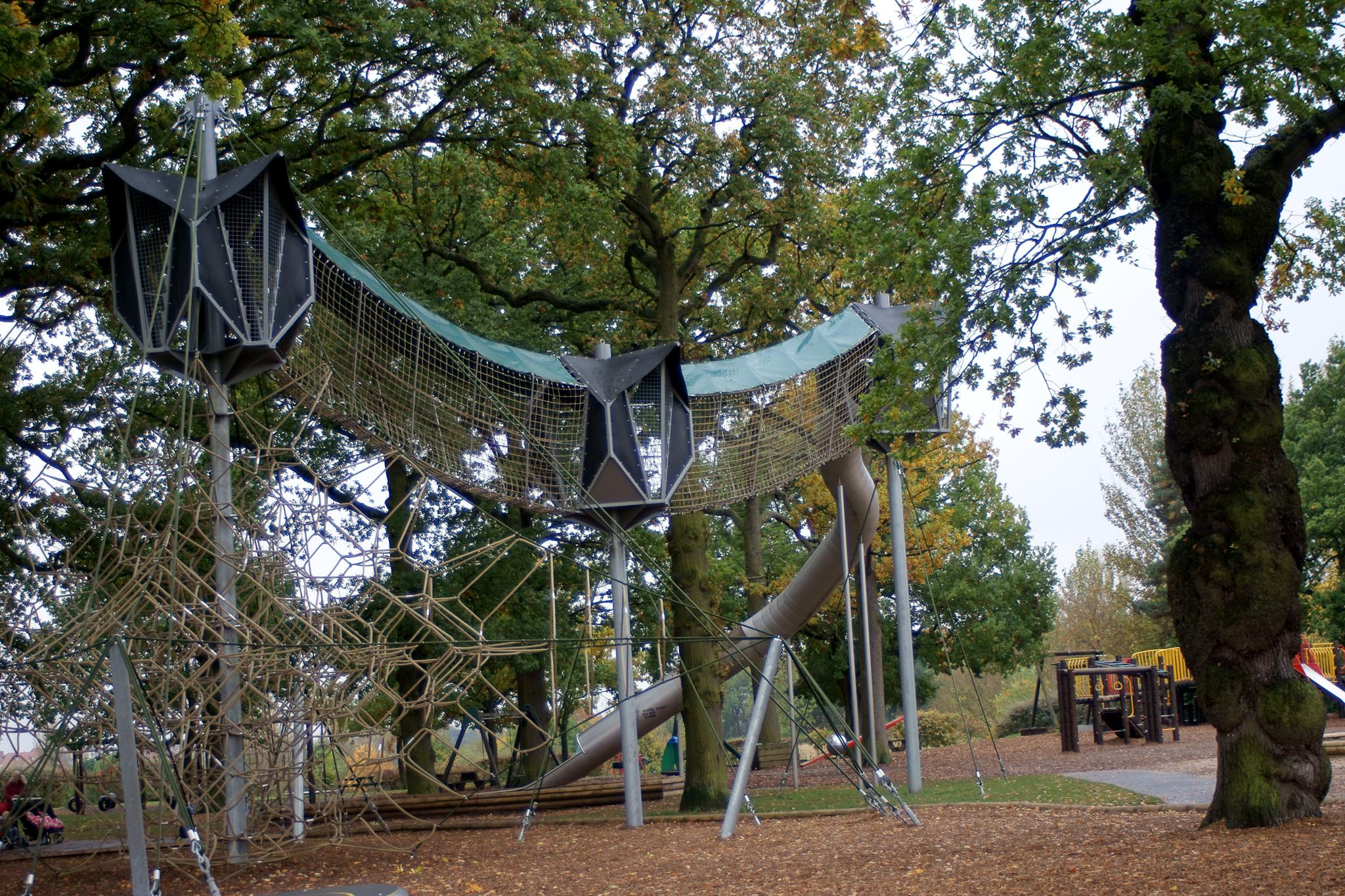
- The playground

- Location within County Durham
- Location: Preston-on-Tees, County Durham
- OS grid: NZ430158
- Coordinates: 54.536°N 1.337°W
- Area: TS18 3
- Website: prestonparkmuseum.co.uk

Preston Park (officially Preston Hall Park) is a 100-acre (0.40 km^{2}) public park in Preston-on-Tees, England. It hosts multiple events each year and is located next to the River Tees.

The land was originally a private residence with large grounds but has since become the property of Stockton-on-Tees Borough Council after being purchased from Sir Robert Ropner. and was redeveloped in 2010–12, with the museum reopening in 2012.

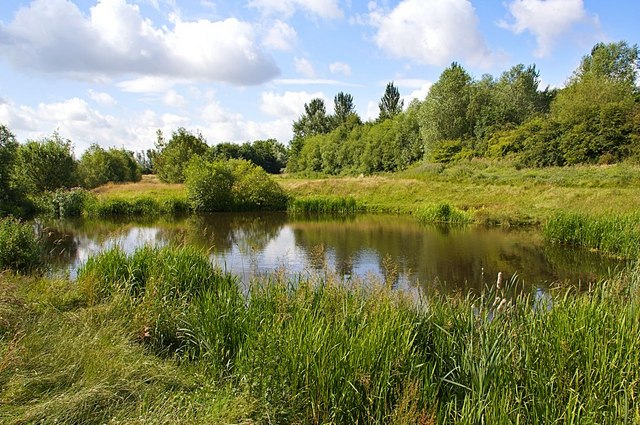
Ponds in the Park

Parking is free, but the Preston Park Museum & Grounds and Butterfly World have small admission charges. The museum has a volunteer community with its participants ranging from students to the retired. They carry out roles in the museum such as gardening, gallery stewarding, supporting learning and costumed interpreters on the Victorian Street.

== Areas of interest ==
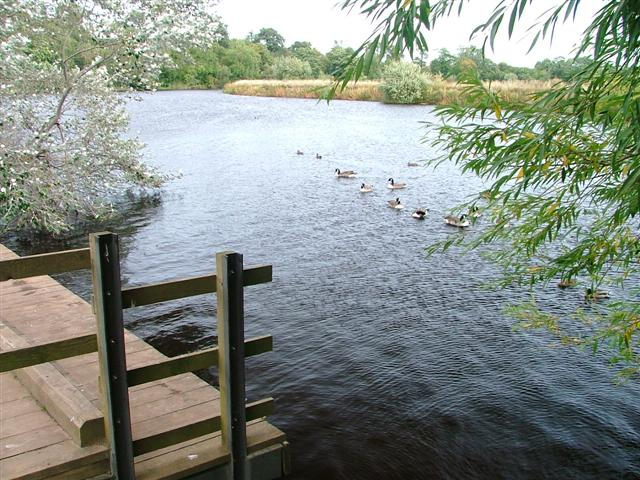
Jetty at the park on the river Tees

Preston Park is made up of several diverse areas:

=== Hall museum ===
It was not until 1882, when the estate and lands were sold to Robert Ropner for the princely sum of £27,500 (£1,328,525.00 in modern money), that the Preston Hall building of today was built.

Ropner was a wealthy shipping and industrial magnate and in common with the style of the times demanded a home to befit his status in society. Major alterations included the addition of a Winter Garden, Music Room, Billiard Room, entrance portico and extensive landscaped parkland – all ‘must haves’ of the Victorian age.

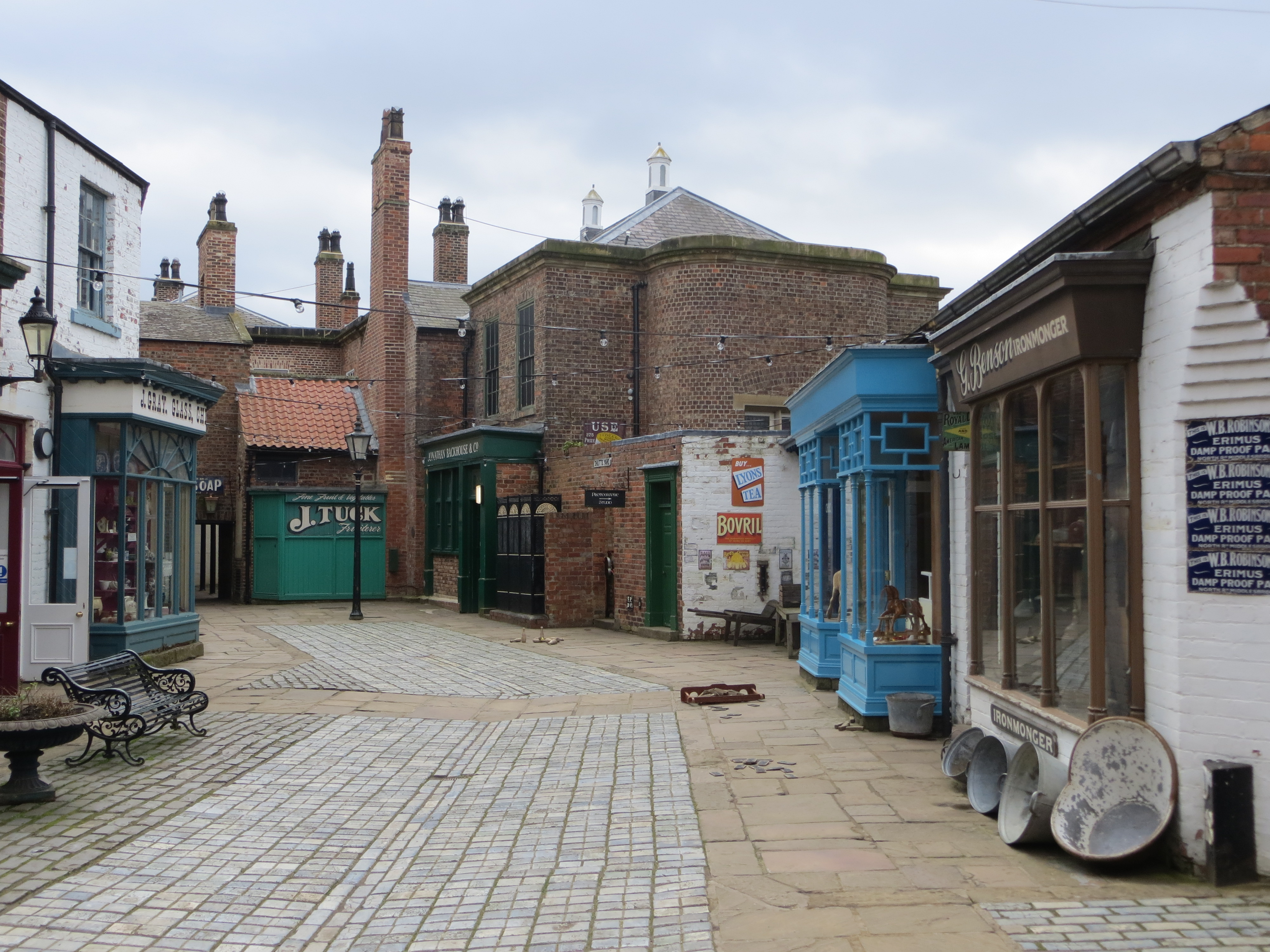
A Victorian style street, part of Preston Hall's museum

The Hall & Park were served by legions of staff, from a butler and cook through to maids and stable hands. Gardeners would tend the grounds and supply the kitchen with produce from the walled garden, which was restored and reopened to the public in 2012.

In 1937 the Hall & Park passed into the hands of a number of companies before being purchased by Stockton Corporation (now the Borough Council) in 1947.The site officially opened as Preston Hall Museum and Park in 1953 and has continued to bring pleasure to generations of visitors young and old ever since.

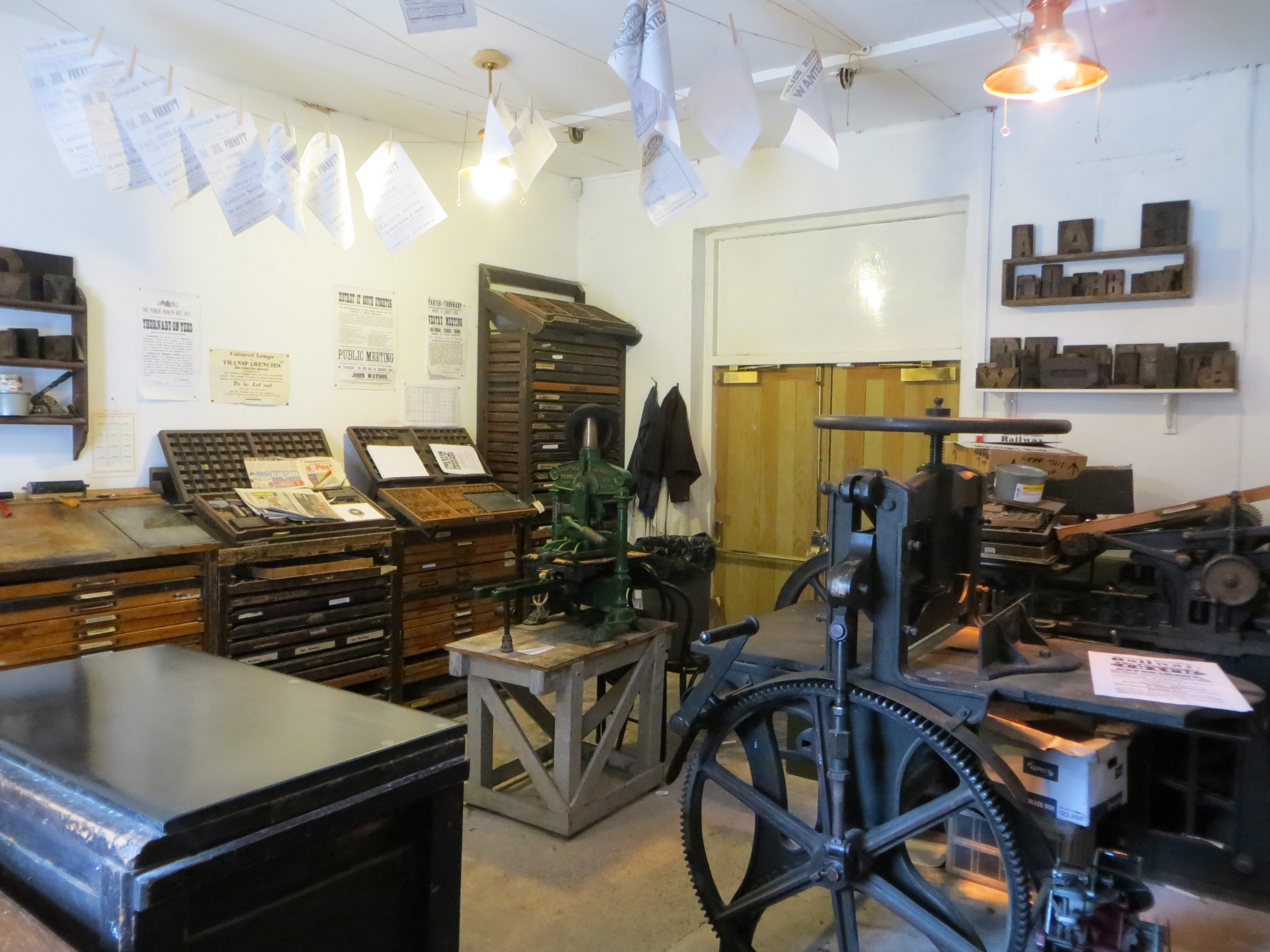
Items on display at the museum

Following a successful bid for funding from the Heritage Lottery Fund and Stockton-on-Tees Borough Council, the Museum and Park have recently reopened following extensive redevelopment work. The £7 million transformation has seen significant improvements to facilities, including better access, the repair and conservation of the Grade II listed building and the development of further features, interpretation and exhibits.

Exhibits in the museum include the Yarm helmet, a c. 10th-century Viking Age helmet found in Yarm. It is the first relatively complete Anglo-Scandinavian helmet found in Britain and only the second Viking helmet discovered in north-west Europe.

=== Showground ===
The flat, grassed area in front of the main house is now the main staging ground for large events held in the park. It is easily able to hold the largest of circus tents and other temporary structures. When not being used for an event, this area will often contain people playing sports or picnicking with their children. The field is used for training by a number of football teams and a local Frisbee team. However the field suffers from drainage problems, meaning that it often becomes waterlogged.

=== Teesside Small Gauge Railway ===
Across the showground from the car park is a model engineering club with a miniature railway. It operates to the public during the summer on Sunday afternoons and on bank holidays from 1pm to 4pm.

=== Butterfly World ===
This building houses an environment specially controlled to allow a variety of exotic butterflies to thrive. There is a charge for entry.

=== Café and Play Area ===
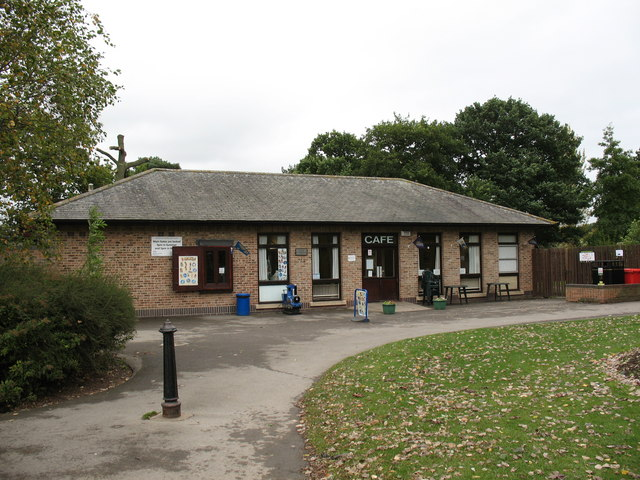
Preston park cafe

Beside the main car park is a café operated by Stockton Borough Council.

Adjacent to the café is an extensive play area containing a variety of traditional swings and more adventurous climbing equipment for children of all ages.

=== Skatepark ===
A concrete skatepark opened on the site of the former crazy-golf course in 2014. The project was built by Wheelscape and cost £25,000. The skatepark is vary varied and suits a wide range of skill levels.

=== Quarry Wood ===
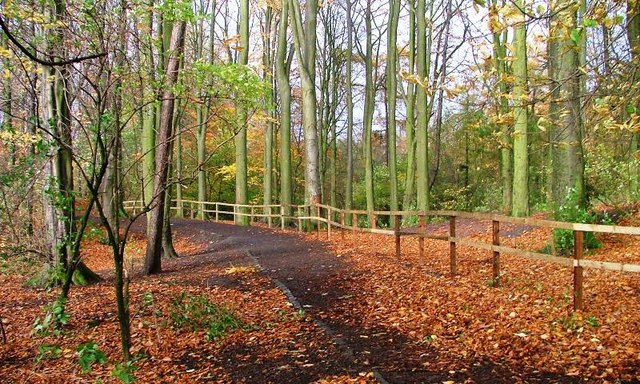
Quarry Wood

The Quarry Wood was declared a nature reserve in 2004. It is a former Victorian Quarry that has now been reclaimed by nature. This is a popular place for younger mountain bikers, with the main attraction being "The Dippers". These are a series of dirt jumps and gravel corners created by the natural terrain. They are mostly fenced off in an attempt to protect the public from out-of-control bikes.

"The Big Dipper" is a 15 ft-deep cut in the ground which is used as a kind of half-pipe. From the top of the slope, riders can aim at a variety of take-off points on the other side, each of which provides differing amounts of "air time".

There are a variety of smaller jumps nearby, as well as some rougher cycling routes.

Furthermore, Quarry Wood is home to a wide spectrum of wildlife including frogs, toads, newts, foxes, rabbits and birds such as moorhen and owls, as well as a host of invertebrates.

== Previous attractions ==
The world's first passenger railway ran through the grounds beside the main road from the early 19th century until 1852. There was no station.

In the 1970s and 80s there was a small zoo within the park, partly covering the area now used by the playground and stretching down to the hall. It had a penguin enclosure. There were also llamas and chipmunks, among others.

Previously in front of the café was a simple crazy golf course. However it was removed in 2014 to make way for the skatepark.

== Relocation of Egglescliffe School ==
In 2009 it was proposed by Ingleby Barwick Councillors that Egglescliffe School be relocated to the park with a footbridge over the river linking the school to the town. The proposal was backed by the then MP for Stockton South, Dari Taylor, but was strongly opposed by many residents because it would have meant the loss of valuable public parkland. The Conservative candidate for the Stockton-South seat, James Wharton, also opposed the proposal before narrowly winning the seat in the 2010 election. Leaflets from Dari Taylor's party have since expressed regret for not opposing the development of Preston Park.

The proposal for the development (coded option D2) has now been removed as a viable option. The reasons given are that funding for the new footbridge would not have come from central government, and that "During the feasibility work undertaken, the location of the proposed bridge also raised significant engineering issues. In addition to this, any additional traffic from a community school facility could not be accommodated without significant upgrading of the road network.", and that the Preston Park allotments would have had to be moved.

From this issue was also born 'Friends of Preston Park', a group consisting of members of the public that raises any issues that become apparent to visitors and presents them to the management of Preston Park during meetings.
