= Preston Hall, Preston-on-Tees =

Preston Hall
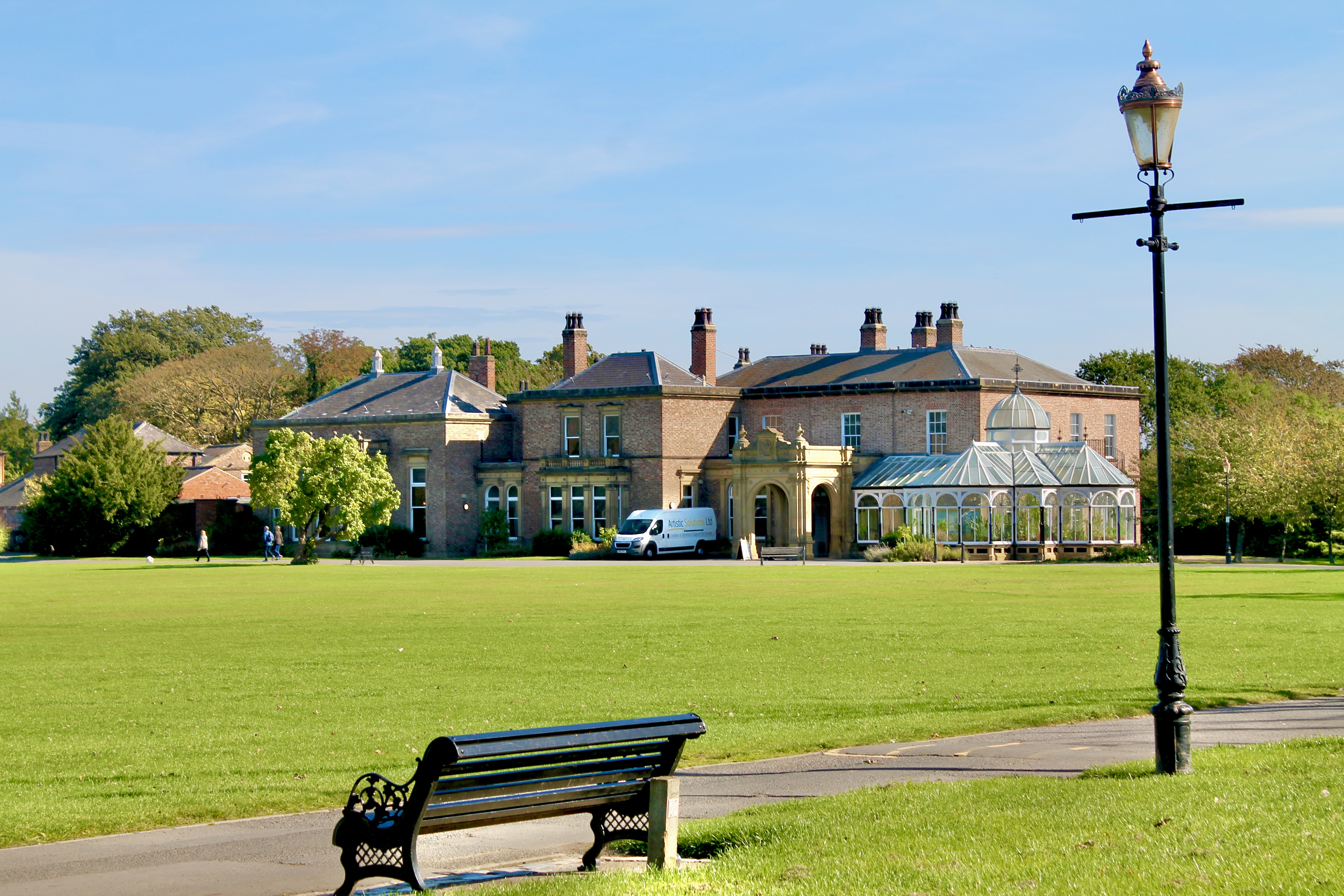
- The Hall backed onto a large field

- Location in County Durham

General information
- Location: County Durham, England, UK
- Coordinates: 54.536°N 1.337°W
- OS grid: NZ430158

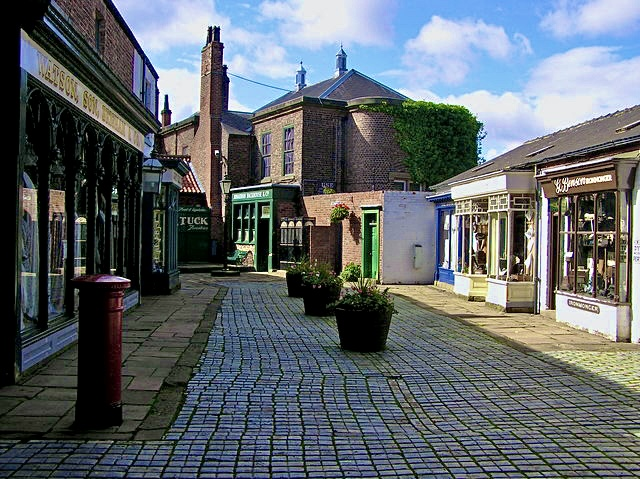
Victorian Street, Preston Hall Museum and Park

Preston Hall is an early 19th century mansion house at Preston-on-Tees, about 4 km south of the centre of Stockton-on-Tees, England. It has been a museum since 1953 and is owned by Stockton-on-Tees Borough Council. It is a listed building. The house stands in 100 acres (0.40 km^{2}) of parkland. The grounds of the house form Preston Park.

== History ==
The manor of Preston on Tees was held in 1515 by William Sayer but was lost when the estates of Lawrence Sayer, who was a Royalist during the English Civil War, were sequestered and sold by the Commonwealth of England. In 1673 the manor was purchased by George Witham and during the residency of the Witham family the manor house was known as Witham Hall. In 1722 William Witham sold the estate to Sir John Eden Bt of Windlestone Hall and in 1820 it was sold again to David Burton Fowler.

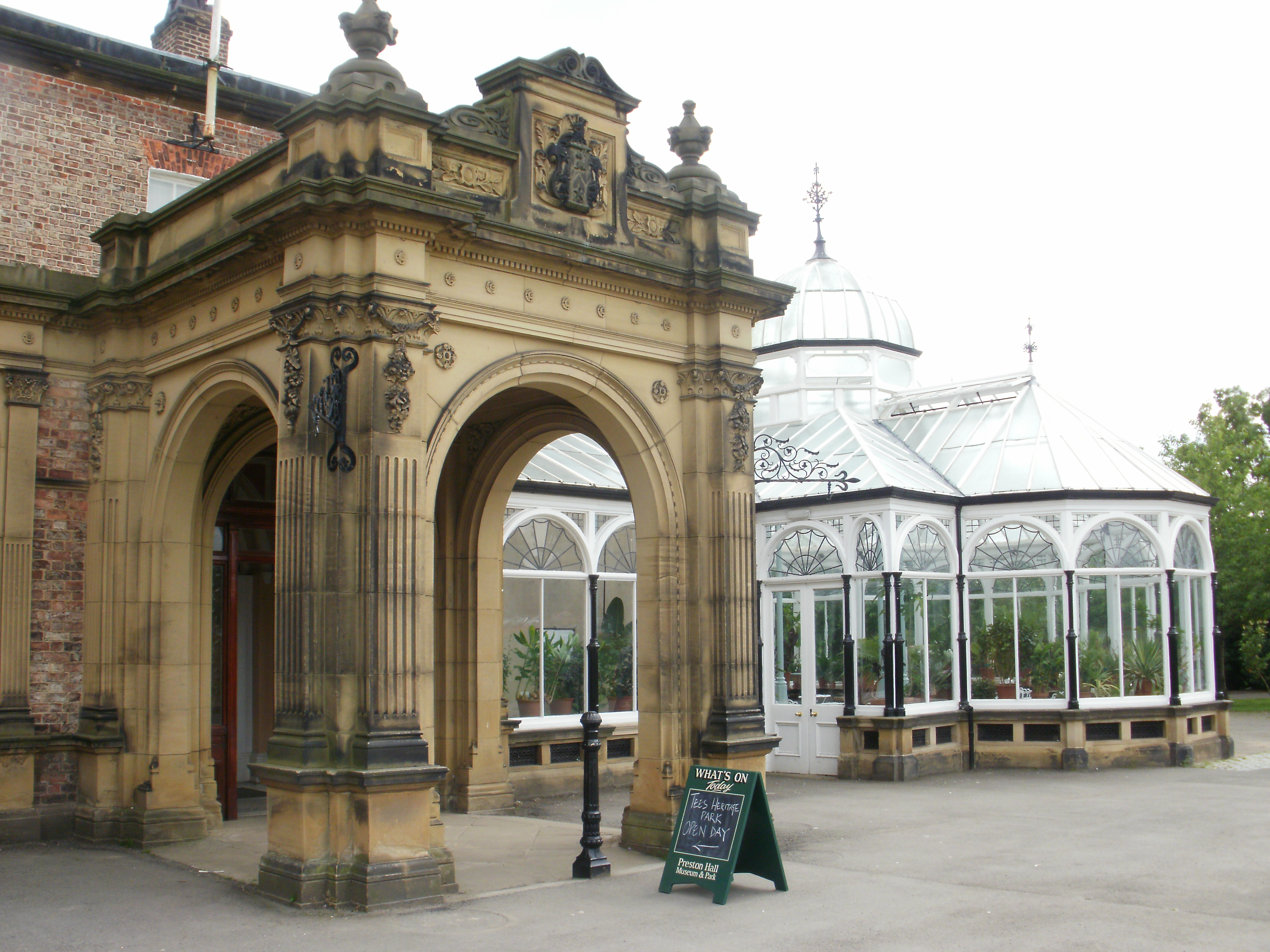
The Hall's porte-cochère and conservatory

In 1825 Fowler built the present Preston Hall as a modest two-storey three-bayed rectangular structure with a service wing. The old manor house was retained in use as a farmhouse until its demolition in 1974.

In 1882 Marshall Fowler sold the estate to Robert Ropner, a shipping merchant and shipbuilder, who was High Sheriff of Durham in 1896 and who became a baronet in 1904. He extended the property by the addition of substantial wing blocks, and in about 1900 he added a large and recently renovated winter garden or conservatory. The Ropner baronets lived in the house until 1937 (in which year Leonard Ropner served as High Sheriff). It was acquired by the Stockton on Tees District Council in 1947.

On 3 June 1953, Preston Hall was officially opened for the first time as a museum, as part of the celebration of the Coronation of Queen Elizabeth II. In the 1970s, there were a number of additions made to the museum, including the building of the popular replica Victorian Street.

== Attractions ==
Following a major redevelopment, the museum reopened to the public as Preston Park Museum & Grounds in 2012. This has reinforced its reputation as one of the region's major cultural attractions and, in its Diamond Jubilee year of 2013, was shortlisted for the prestigious Art Fund Museum of the Year award.

The Hall's grounds have become a popular local park, with woodland and riverside walks, an adventure play area and a skate park. Within the park are other attractions, including Butterfly World (a tropical rainforest hothouse filled with a variety of species of butterflies and other animals), rowing boat hire from RiverShack and the volunteer-run Teesside Small Gauge Railway.

== The Museum ==
Following the failure of a scheme to build housing on the site, the decision was made to transform Preston Hall into a museum and to use the grounds as parkland. The museum opened to the public in 1953. In April 2008, the Heritage Lottery Fund awarded a grant of £3.7 million towards a major refurbishment of the building and the museum's collections.

After its redevelopment, Preston Park Museum & Grounds now has four themed galleries, telling the stories of the Hall, the local area and the people who have lived here, as well as showcasing the many treasures held in the collection. This includes the famous Georges de La Tour painting The Dice Players, which is part of the Clephan Bequest. This bequest is at the heart of the museum's collection, together with the outstanding Spence Collection of arms, armour and decorative objects and the Ions Collection of ceramics and glassware.

Created from the Hall's service wing and outbuildings, the replica Victorian Street is a favourite feature of the museum for many of its visitors. Representing life in 1895, people can step back in time and enjoy the range of recreated shops and a working tearoom. These are brought to life by a team of costumed volunteers. The Victorian Street is often used as a film set, including TV and films.

A key part of the redevelopment project was the restoration and reopening of the Victorian Walled Kitchen Garden and Orchard. This fine example of what was once a staple of stately homes now displays bright floral planting and heritage varieties of fruit and vegetables. It is open throughout the spring and summer.

The museum also has a number of temporary exhibition gallery spaces, which host a changing series of exhibitions throughout the year. These showcase the museum's rich collection, exhibitions of local and community interest, travelling exhibitions and more.

=== The Dice Players ===
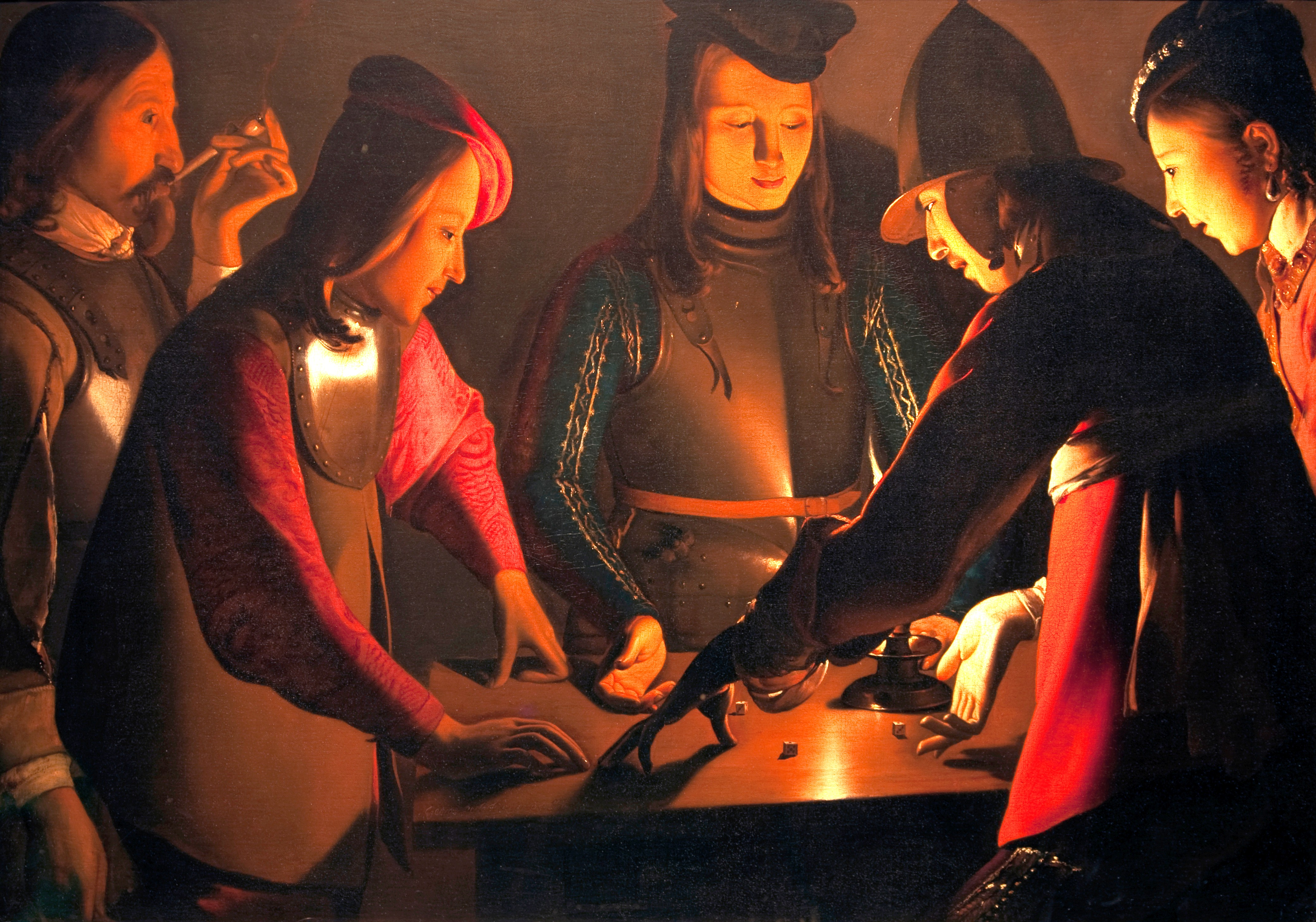
The Dice Players

The museum contains a notable oil painting called The Dice Players by Georges de La Tour. It is regarded as a superb example of the artist's work and, as well as being on display in the museum, has been loaned out for a number of prestigious major exhibitions.

The painting was part of a collection left to the borough in 1934 in memory of Edwin Clephan, who had been born in Stockton, by his daughter Annie. The significance of this work was not realised until 1972, when the collection was being valued by Christopher Wood of Christie's. Believing it to be a work of some significance, Wood sought the opinion of Benedict Nicholson, a noted expert on de La Tour, who confirmed that this work was indeed from the hand of this French artist.
