= Egglesburn =

Village in County Durham, England

Coordinates: 54.616°N 2.026°W

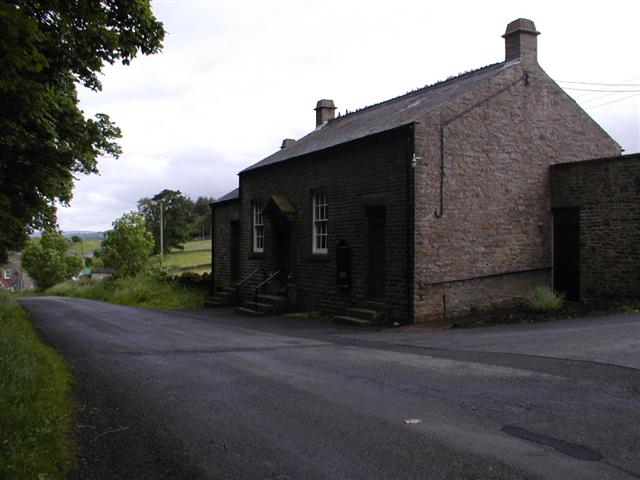
- Egglesburn Baptist Chapel

- Location within County Durham
- OS grid reference: NY984245
- Unitary authority: County Durham
- Ceremonial county: County Durham
- Region: North East
- Country: England
- Sovereign state: United Kingdom
- Post town: DARLINGTON
- Postcode district: DL12
- Police: Durham
- Fire: County Durham and Darlington
- Ambulance: North East

Egglesburn is a village in County Durham, Northern England. It is in the Teesdale, Mickleton is on opposite bank of the River Tees.

In the 1960s Durham County Council bought a former sand and gravel quarry which they turned into a wild life reserve. It is now the woodland known as Egglesburn Wood and open as a public recreation area.
