= St John the Baptist, Egglescliffe =

Coordinates: 54.514°N 1.353°W

Egglescliffe Parish Church
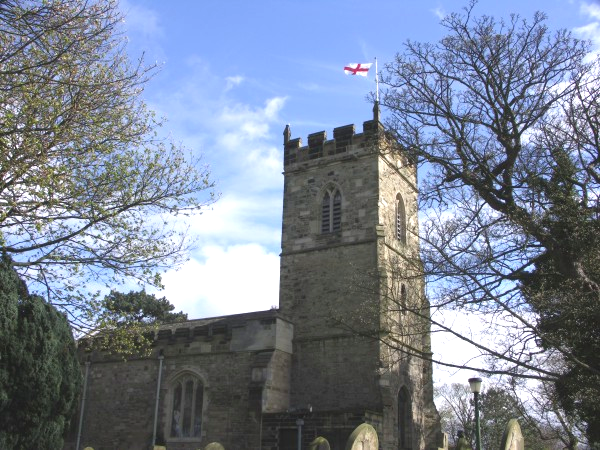
- View of Egglescliffe Parish Church from the churchyard
- OS grid reference: NZ 42065 13166
- Denomination: Church of England
- Churchmanship: Broad Church

History
- Dedication: St John the Baptist

Administration
- Province: York
- Diocese: Durham
- Archdeaconry: Auckland
- Deanery: Stockton
- Parish: Egglescliffe

Clergy
- Rector: Rev Sylvia Wilson

The parish church of St John the Baptist, Egglescliffe is an Anglican church in the village of Egglescliffe, Stockton-on-Tees. It is a perpendicular church, built in the Norman style. There has been a church on the site for at least 900 years, however the original date of construction is unknown. It is claimed that there is a tunnel from the church to the Friarage in the grounds Yarm School. It is alleged that it was originally used as an escape tunnel for the monks when the Yarm School area was a catholic house. The Dominican Friars, Black Friars, occupied a site in Yarm from 1286 to 1583. It is part of a long history and many more are buried in the church yard than there are gravestones for - some graves marked with just one name actually contain up to four people, since people have been buried there for hundreds and hundreds of years, grave stones only being introduced recently. There are also legends of spirits of the deceased buried in the cemetery, two gardeners, father and son, and the former owner of The Bluebell in Yarm. When you enter the church, directly to the left of the porch is an Anglo-Saxon coffin top that was discovered on-site and inside there are many more historical wonders from all dates.

The church was designated a Grade I listed building in November 1967.
