= A135 road =

Road in Teesside, England

Coordinates: 54.53687°N 1.34145°W

A135

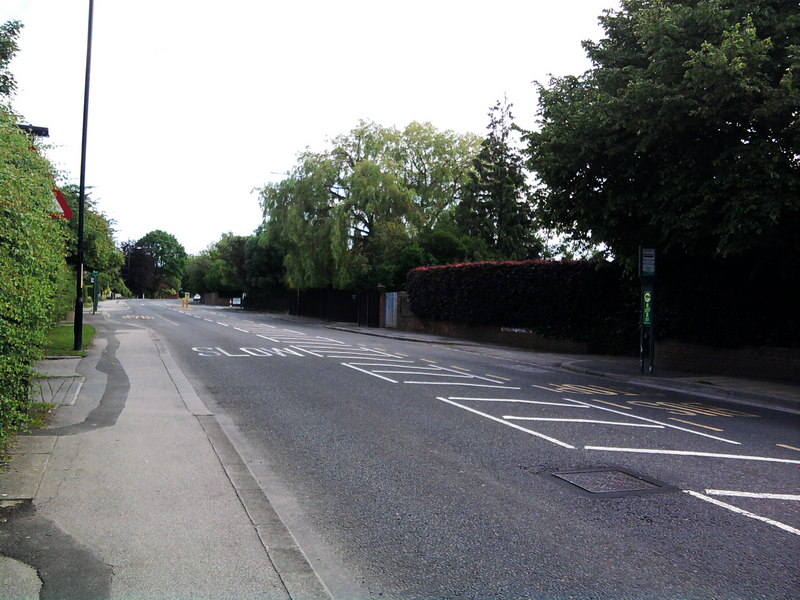

Route information
- Length: 3.7 mi (6.0 km)

Major junctions
- North end: Stockton-on-Tees
- South end: Yarm

Location
- Country: United Kingdom

Road network
- Roads in the United Kingdom; Motorways; A and B road zones

The A135 is a road in England, running from Stockton-on-Tees through Eaglescliffe to Yarm on the A67, on the boundary with the River Tees. It is also known as Yarm Road, and was the A19 before the dual carriageway was built.

== Road statistics ==
Traffic statistics by year: All traffic
	2000	2001	2002	2003	2004	2005
Pedal Cycles	158	151	157	141	114	96
Motorcycles and Mopeds	150	156	158	177	156	158
Cars	18,666	19,039	19,001	18,735	18,773	18,304
Buses and Coaches	437	445	455	406	378	372
Light Goods Vehicles	2,047	2,039	2,043	2,227	2,207	2,264
Two-axle Rigid HGVs	214	210	202	217	218	209
Three-axle Rigid HGVs	15	17	17	19	20	19
Four-axle Rigid HGVs	3	3	3	3	4	4
Three-axle Articulated HGVs	45	40	36	34	33	29
Five-axle Articulated HGVs	52	45	39	35	30	26
Six-axle Articulated HGVs	13	15	17	19	20	22
All HGVs	342	330	314	327	325	309
All motor vehicles	21,642	22,009	21,971	21,872	21,839	21,407

Traffic statistics by year: Eastbound
	2000	2001	2002	2003	2004	2005
Pedal Cycles	88	84	87	78	63	53
Motorcycles and Mopeds	77	80	81	91	80	81
Cars	8,919	9,097	9,079	8,952	8,970	8,746
Buses and Coaches	211	215	220	196	183	180
Light Goods Vehicles	971	967	969	1,056	1,047	1,074
Two-axle Rigid HGVs	105	103	99	106	107	102
Three-axle Rigid HGVs	9	10	10	11	12	11
Four-axle Rigid HGVs	1	1	1	1	1	1
Three-axle Articulated HGVs	19	17	15	14	14	12
Five-axle Articulated HGVs	24	21	18	16	14	12
Six-axle Articulated HGVs	4	5	6	7	7	8
All HGVs	168	157	149	155	155	146
All motor vehicles	10,340	10,516	10,498	10,450	10,435	10,227

Traffic statistics by year: Westbound
	2000	2001	2002	2003	2004	2005
Pedal Cycles	70	67	70	63	51	43
Motorcycles and Mopeds	73	76	77	86	76	77
Cars	9,747	9,942	9,922	9,783	9,803	9,558
Buses and Coaches	226	230	235	210	195	192
Light Goods Vehicles	1,076	1,072	1,074	1,171	1,160	1,190
Two-axle Rigid HGVs	109	107	103	111	111	107
Three-axle Rigid HGVs	6	7	7	8	8	8
Four-axle Rigid HGVs	2	2	2	2	3	3
Three-axle Articulated HGVs	26	23	21	20	19	17
Five-axle Articulated HGVs	28	24	21	19	16	14
Six-axle Articulated HGVs	9	10	11	12	13	14
All HGVs	180	173	165	172	170	163
All motor vehicles	11,302	11,493	11,473	11,422	11,404	11,180

== See also ==
- A135
