= Jacqui Cheer =

British police officer

Jacqui Cheer QPM
- Born: Jacqueline Ann Cheer; September 1961 (age 64)
- Occupation: Police Officer

Jacqueline ("Jacqui") Ann Cheer (born September 1961) is a British former senior police officer. She was the chief constable of Cleveland Police until retiring from the police service in March 2016.

== Education ==
Cheer studied at Fitzwilliam College, Cambridge.

== Early career ==
Cheer joined Essex Police in 1984. In 2004, she attended a Strategic Command Course, and transferred to Suffolk Police as an assistant chief constable in 2006. She was promoted to Deputy Chief Constable with Suffolk.

== Career with Cleveland Police ==
Cheer was appointed chief constable of Cleveland Police on a permanent basis by the force's police and crime commissioner, Barry Coppinger, in February 2013. She was appointed temporary chief in late 2011, following the suspension and subsequent sacking of her predecessor, Sean Price, and his deputy, Derek Bonnard.

From January to March 2015, Cheer was seconded as an instructor to the London Police College.

== Honors and awards ==
She was awarded the Queen's Police Medal in the 2012 New Year Honours.

Police appointments
Preceded by Sean Price	Chief Constable of Cleveland Police; 2011–2016	Succeeded by Iain Spittal
