= Egglescliffe School =

Egglescliffe School & Sixth Form College

Location
- Urlay Nook Road; Egglescliffe/ Urlay Nook; Stockton-on-Tees, County Durham, TS16 0LA; England; 54.516450°N 1.360525°W

Information
- Type: Academy
- Established: 1962
- Local authority: Stockton-on-Tees
- Trust: Spark Education Trust
- Department for Education URN: 143063 Tables
- Ofsted: Reports
- Executive headteacher: Lindsay Oyston
- Headteacher: Nigel Gittins
- Gender: Coeducational
- Age: 11 to 18
- Enrolment: 1,530
- Houses: Astronauts: Aldrin, Armstrong and Gagarin (Lower houses); Tereshkova and Lovell (Upper houses)
- Colours: Navy, black, and white
- Website: egglescliffe.org.uk

Egglescliffe School & Sixth Form College is a large Coeducational secondary school and sixth form located between Egglescliffe and Urlay Nook in the Borough of Stockton-on-Tees, County Durham, England.

== History ==
Beginning as a small rural secondary school of 200 pupils in 1962, Egglescliffe became a comprehensive in the 1970s, gradually growing to its current size of over 1400 pupils, including sixth formers. There have been seven headteachers since it opened: Frank Davison, Alan Basset, David Oliver, Angela Darnell, Simon White, Lindsay Oyston and Neil Gittins. In 2010, Darnell was awarded an OBE for "services to education". In 2012 the school celebrated its 50th anniversary.

== Academic Assessments ==
In 1999, Egglescliffe was awarded Specialist Status and designated an Arts College specialising in music and drama, since then refurbishment of the music block has transformed the interior structure of the department. Its Music Department has a longstanding reputation for performance work. The school has also been designated a National Teaching school. These are outstanding schools which have been nationally recognised for their capacity to support and help other schools to improve outcomes.

In July 2014 Egglescliffe School was condemned by the government for breaching its own anti-bullying policy after a complaint from a parent whose daughter had attempted suicide. The Department for Education found that Egglescliffe school was at fault as it failed to properly record bullying incidents against the victim. The Department for Educations finding said "The headteacher also confirms that no incident forms had been completed for 12 months. No evidence has been provided to confirm that any of the incidents that this pupil reported were recorded using the Eportal or incident form methods. The department considers this to be a breach of the school’s own anti-bullying policy."

In 2018, Gareth Parry, a music teacher, was found to be having sexual relations with an underage student at the school.

=== Anthony Gears and the drama department ===
From 1999 until his death on 25 June 2010, it was under the direction of Anthony Gears, joined by a team of six, teaching drama and theatre. He was succeeded as Director of Performing Arts by Harmony Gibson, his daughter.

A specialist theatre was built to host the many Drama and Theatre productions throughout the school year. It is also home to Egglescliffe Youth Theatre, launched in its present form in September 1986, now one of the longest-running Theatre groups in the country. It holds weekly sessions and yearly summer productions.

=== Music department ===
Head of the music department for 32 years was Keith Hewson, who retired in 2008. Over those years his orchestras, brass bands, choirs, jazz ensembles and chamber groups appeared at the Music for Youth National Festival over 80 times winning many outstanding performance awards and appearing at the Royal Albert Hall School proms on 19 occasions. For over ten years Hewson was a member of the government's Music and Dance Scheme Panel and the Specialist Schools Music Expert Panel. In 2002 he was voted Classic FM Music Teacher of the Year. In April 2008, following the award of High Performing Specialist Status, the school was designated a second specialism as a science college. In 2012, the current Head of Music, Matthew Haworth, was awarded the Secondary Music Teacher of the Year by Classic FM. In recent years the various ensembles of the school have played in a number of significant venues such as Symphony Hall Birmingham, Ely Cathedral, Durham Cathedral, Town Hall Birmingham, The Sage Gateshead, St Marks Venice, The Royal Albert Hall and Blackpool Winter Gardens.

In March 2018 former "respected" Egglescliffe school music teacher Gareth Parry was found guilty of child sex charges. His "despicable" behaviour at Egglescliffe school was condemned by a child protection charity. Parry had messaged a girl on WhatsApp. Barrister Stephen Constantine said Parry had been held in "high regard" by colleagues. He was handed a six-year sentence for what a judge said were "appalling" crimes.

== Notable Visitors to Egglescliffe School ==
- Tony Blair (former British Prime Minister)
- Caroline Flint (former Shadow Energy Secretary)
- Doug Scott (mountaineer)
- James Wharton (former MP for Stockton South)
- William Hague (former Foreign Secretary and Leader of the Opposition)
- Paul McCreesh (artistic director of the Gabrieli Consort & Players)
- Andrew Aldrin (son of Buzz Aldrin)
- Neil Kinnock (former leader of the Labour party)

== The South Bank Show ==
The school featured in an episode of The South Bank Show titled "Howard Goodall — A Musical Nation" that aired on Sunday 19 December 2004 on ITV, in which he explored Britain's musical provision for young people.

== 50th anniversary concert ==
The concert, performed at the Sage, Gateshead on 15 July 2012, was a huge success.

== Sports ==
The school offers a wide range of sporting activities and facilities including an artificial turf pitch. The school offers: netball, field hockey, basketball, rounders, football, table tennis, cricket, trampolining, volleyball, tennis, fitness, dodgeball, rugby union, softball, boxercise, athletics, and badminton.

== Notable former pupils ==
- Bailey Peacock-Farrell — goalkeeper for Blackpool (on loan from Birmingham City)
- La Voix - Drag Queen and runner-up of season 6 of RuPaul's Drag Race UK
