= Cleveland Police =

Territorial police force in England

- Logo of the Cleveland Police force

Agency overview
- Formed: 1 April 1974; 52 years ago
- Preceding agencies: part of York and North East Yorkshire Police; Teesside Constabulary; part of Durham Constabulary
- Employees: 2,067
- Annual budget: £95.4 million

Jurisdictional structure
- Operations jurisdiction: North Yorkshire (part); County Durham (part)
- Map of police area
- Area: 231 square miles (600 km^{2})
- Population: 569,000
- Legal jurisdiction: England and Wales
- Constituting instrument: Police Act 1996
- General nature: Local civilian police

Operational structure
- Overseen by: His Majesty's Inspectorate of Constabulary and Fire & Rescue Services; Independent Office for Police Conduct
- Headquarters: Middlesbrough
- Police Officers: 1,198
- Police Community Support Officers: 130
- Police and Crime Commissioner responsible: Matt Storey (Labour) since 2024
- Agency executive: Victoria Fuller, Chief Constable
- Local Policing Areas: Hartlepool, Redcar and Cleveland, Middlesbrough and Stockton-on-Tees

Website
- www.cleveland.police.uk

Cleveland Police is a territorial police force in England responsible for the policing the boroughs of Middlesbrough, Redcar and Cleveland, Hartlepool, and Stockton-on-Tees in North East England. The force is overseen by the Cleveland Police and Crime Commissioner. Since 2025, the chief constable has been Victoria Fuller.

The force covers an area of 231 square miles (600 km^{2}) with a recorded population of 569,000 in 2011. Geographically, the force has the second smallest police area of the 43 territorial police forces of England and Wales, after the City of London Police. The force is responsible for policing a predominantly urban area with higher levels of deprivation than average in the United Kingdom.

In terms of officer numbers, Cleveland Police is the 12th smallest of the 48 police forces of the United Kingdom. As of September 2017, the force had 1,274 police officers, 278 police staff, 124 police community support officers and 64 special constables. In the 2019 annual assessment by His Majesty's Inspectorate of Constabulary, Cleveland Police was rated 'inadequate' overall and rated 'inadequate' in all review areas, concluding that "crime prevention isn't a priority for the force and this is a cause of concern".

== History ==
The force was established as Cleveland Constabulary on 1 April 1974, covering the newly created county of Cleveland. When Cleveland was abolished in 1996 the constabulary was not, and continued as the police force of the four unitary authority areas that replaced the county. It was renamed Cleveland Police in the same year.

It is a successor to the Teesside Constabulary, and also part of the York and North East Yorkshire Police and part of Durham Constabulary. The police area is the second smallest geographically, after the area covered by the City of London Police.

Under proposals made by the Home Secretary on 6 February 2006, a proposal for a merger with Northumbria Police and Durham Constabulary to form a single strategic police force for the North East England was suggested. Cleveland Police proposed instead merging with the southern area of Durham Constabulary. In July 2006, the plans to merge the three forces were abandoned.

=== New force headquarters ===
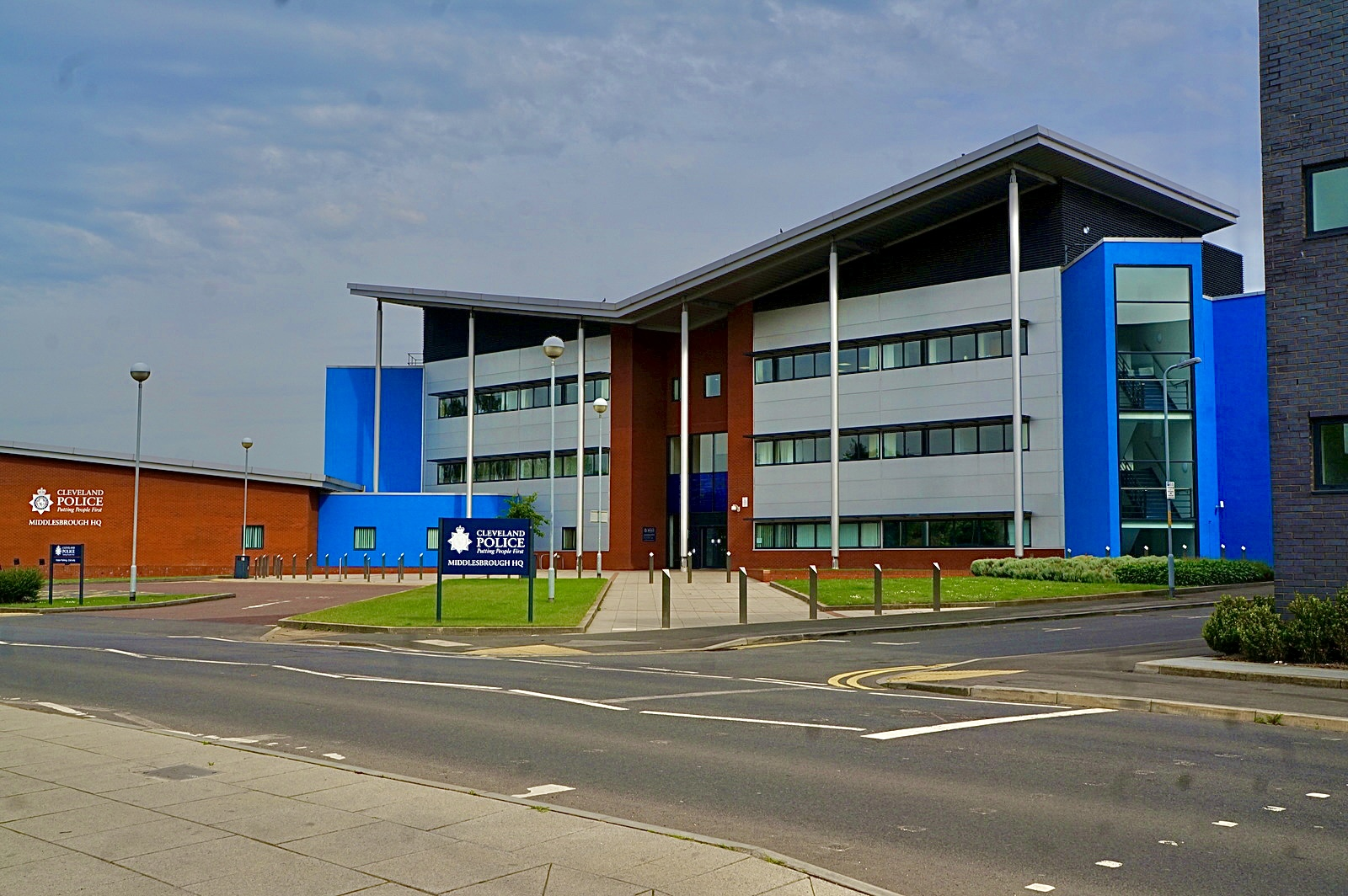
Cleveland Police HQ in Middlesbrough

On 31 January 2007, the new headquarters in Middlesbrough were opened, boasting a 50-cell custody unit including a purpose-built prevention of terrorism suite, one of only three in the country. It has been designed to increase the speed and safety of detainee handling with secure vehicle docking, video links to court and CCTV links in all cells for improved prisoner safety.

The Middlesbrough headquarters is the centrepiece of Cleveland Police Authority's multi-million pound private finance initiative project which has also seen a new headquarters for Redcar and Cleveland district and new town offices in Redcar and South Bank. The building, which was officially opened by the then Home Secretary John Reid, is seen as not only the spearhead to policing Cleveland in the 21st century but also the gateway to the regeneration of the St Hilda's area of the town and the flagship Middlehaven project.

On 5 January 2009, the force launched its cadets programme, something which many other police forces have operated for some years. There are 20 places available in each district, and the cadets will meet each week in groups run by police officers, police community support officers, youth workers and volunteers. There will also be the chance to gain recognised qualifications, such as the Duke of Edinburgh Award.

=== Placement into special measures ===
In September 2019, Cleveland Police was put into special measures after Her Majesty's Inspectorate of Constabulary and Fire & Rescue Services (HMICFRS) rated the service as inadequate overall and in three key areas: the extent to which the force is effective at reducing crime and keeping people safe; operates efficiently and sustainably; and treats the public and its workforce legitimately were all found inadequate.

The report by HMICFRS stated that Cleveland Police were "putting the public at risk," with staff describing the force as "directionless, rudderless and clueless". The report criticised high-ranking officers and staff for "not taking responsibility" of the force, with some "not acting with honesty, integrity and competence". Vulnerable people including children were not identified and left at risk. Despite large numbers of domestic abuse victims being repeat victims offenders were not always proactively pursued. There were delays before police tried to locate youngsters reported missing. Some victims of honour-based violence and survivors allegedly had had a "terrible experience". Crime rose 17.6% in the year to 2019 but according to the watchdog, "crime prevention isn't a priority for the force and this is a cause of concern". The quality of investigations needs improvement, the watchdog maintains.

A year after the publication of the report, Cleveland Police and Crime Commissioner (PCC) Barry Coppinger of the Labour Party resigned. Coppinger cited stress and the workload impacting on his health for his resignation. His resignation was immediate in September 2020 and an interim PCC took over until an election for the post in May 2021, in which Steve Turner of the Conservative Party was elected.

=== Chief constables ===
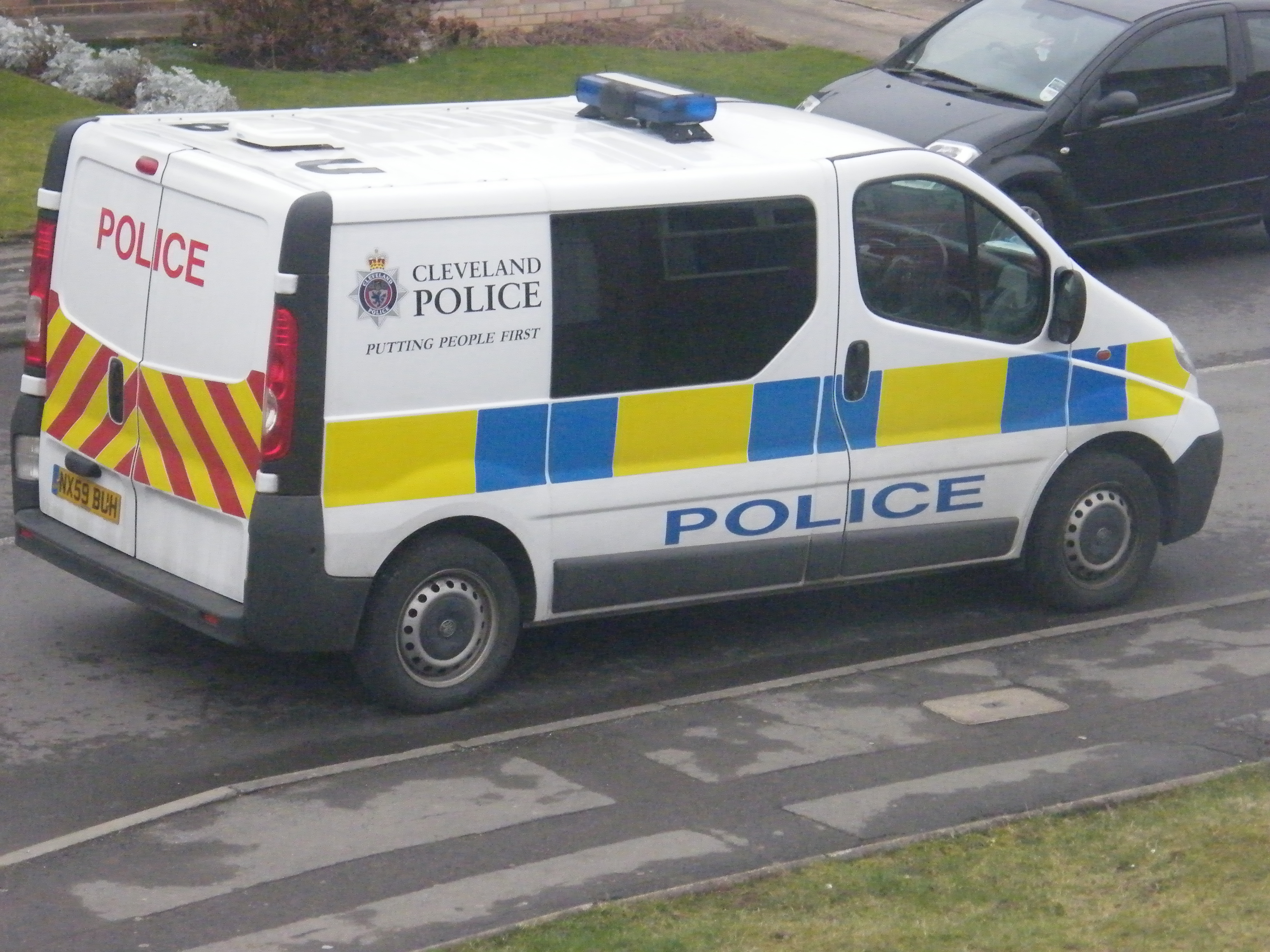
Cleveland Police Vauxhall Vivaro pictured in 2011

- 1974–1976: Ralph Davison
- 1976–1990: Christopher Payne
- 1990–1993: Keith Hellawell
- 1993–2003: Barry D. Shaw
- 2003–2012: Sean Price, (dismissed for gross misconduct)
- 2013–2016: Jacqui Cheer
- 2016–2018: Iain Spittal
- 2018–2019: Mike Veale
- 2019: Lee Freeman (Interim chief constable following Mike Veale's sudden departure)
- 2019–2021: Richard Lewis
- 2021–2022: Helen McMillan (Acting chief constable after Richard Lewis' departure)
- 2023–2025: Mark Webster
- 2025–present: Victoria Fuller

=== Police and crime commissioners ===
- 2012–2020: Barry Coppinger (Labour)
- 2020–2021: Lisa Oldroyd (interim following resignation of Coppinger)
- 2021–2024: Steve Turner Conservative
- 2024–present: Matt Storey (Labour)

=== Officers killed in the line of duty ===
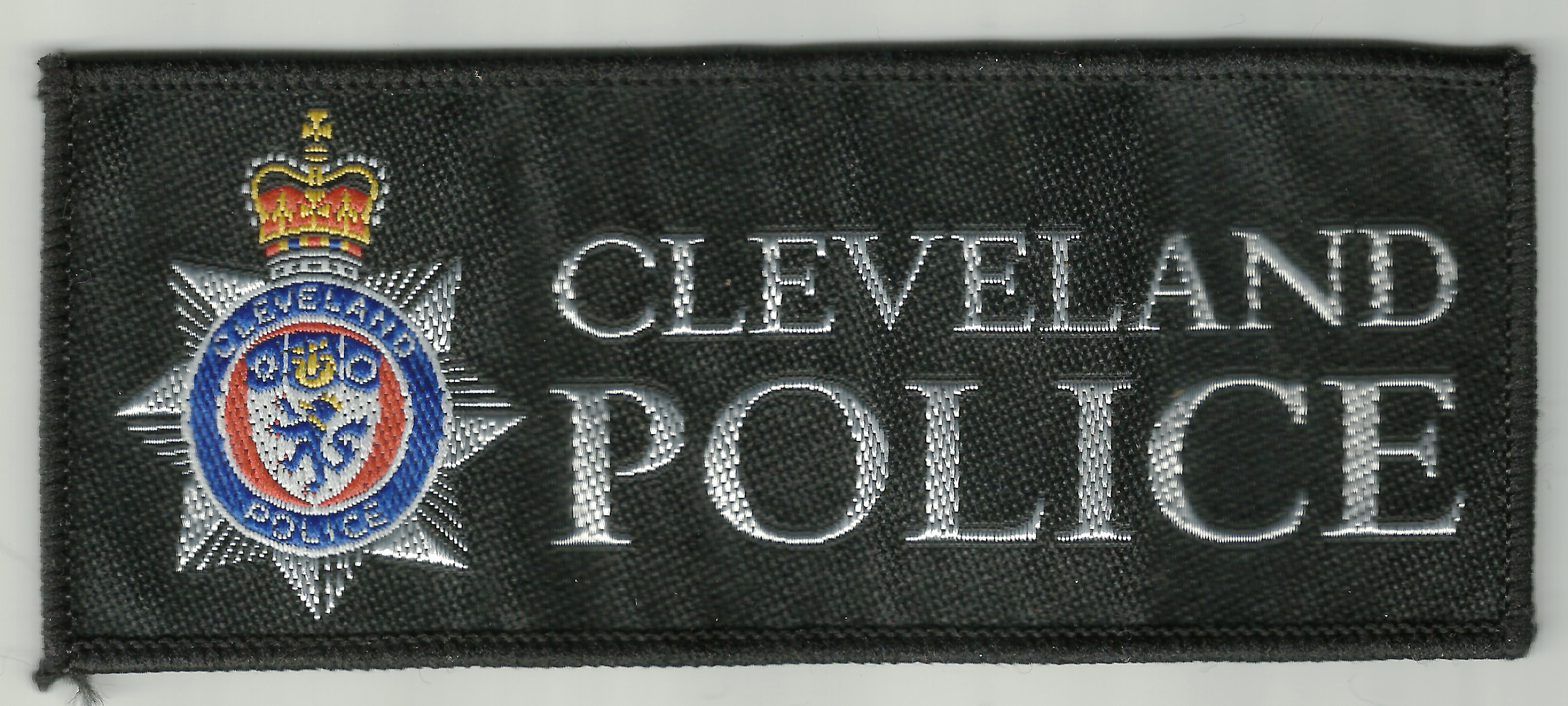
Cleveland Police Patch

The Police Roll of Honour Trust and Police Memorial Trust list and commemorate all British police officers killed in the line of duty. Since its establishment in 1984, the Police Memorial Trust has erected 50 memorials nationally to some of those officers.

Since 1893, the following officers of Cleveland Police were killed while on duty or attempting to prevent or stop a crime in progress:

- Police Constable William Henderson – 1893 (shot attempting to disarm a man)
- Police Constable Tom Clough and Police Constable Matthew Blades – 2026 (killed when their marked vehicle was struck by a non-police vehicle going the wrong way on the A66 road in South Bank)

== Force structure ==
As of September 2017, the force had 1,274 police officers, 278 police staff, 124 police community support officers and 64 special constables.

Cleveland Police area is divided into four local policing areas (LPAs), previously known as districts, which are coterminous with the four unitary authorities of Hartlepool, Middlesbrough, Redcar and Cleveland and Stockton-on-Tees. These LPAs are split between North and South of the River Tees for operational purposes.

In response to a Freedom of Information Act request in July 2018, Cleveland Police published (in October 2018) the organisational structure of its 'Basic Command Units / Local Policing Units / District Policing Teams or equivalent'. The chart shows the number of police officers of each rank assigned to each unit.

=== Matrix team ===
In January 2024, Cleveland Police launched the Matrix team, modelled on a concept first employed by Merseyside Police and consisting of mergers and 'one team' partnerships between the force's units, including the Operational Support Unit, which was renamed to 'Tactical Disruption Team', Firearms, the Dog Section and Roads Policing. Vehicles in this unit were given Matrix logos, with vans belonging to the Tactical Disruption Team also painted a high-visibility yellow; rebranding the vehicle fleet included in the Matrix team cost £20,000 from within Cleveland's fleet budget.

== PEEL assessments ==
His Majesty's Inspectorate of Constabulary (HMICFRS) conducts a periodic police effectiveness, efficiency and legitimacy (PEEL) inspection of each police service's performance. In its latest PEEL inspection, Cleveland was rated as follows:

	Outstanding	Good	Adequate	Requires Improvement	Inadequate
2021/22 rating		Recording data about crime	Treatment of the public; Responding to the public; Disrupting serious organised crime; Managing offenders	Investigating crime; Protecting vulnerable people; Developing a positive workplace	Preventing crime; Good use of resources

== Alleged or actual offences involving serving officers ==
In 2007, it was reported that Detective Constable Steve Pennington, who was convicted of a drink driving offence in 2000 and jailed for four months, had been granted a £500,000 pay-off by the force garnering much criticism from members of the public and anti drink driving campaigners.

In April 2012, Cleveland Police admitted liability for "malicious prosecution" and were ordered to pay out over £841,000, one of the largest compensation sums in UK police history. The court was told former PC Sultan Alam was "stitched up" by fellow officers after he launched industrial tribunal proceedings in 1993, complaining of racial discrimination following a series of incidents that included a Ku Klux Klan poster being left on his desk. Cleveland Police admitted that officers suppressed evidence that led to Alam being wrongfully imprisoned for conspiracy to steal motor parts and enduring a 17-year battle to clear his name. Alam, who was, as of 2012, considering a position in public office, did not believe that the force had improved and stated that racism had gone "underground", with ethnic minorities being denied the same opportunities as their white colleagues.

In October 2012 the force's chief constable, Sean Price, was sacked after being found guilty of deceit and misconduct. He was dismissed from his £190,000 a year job (one of the highest rates in the country for a chief constable), having been suspended in August 2011 on full pay.

In May 2013, Cleveland Police agreed to pay a settlement of £550,000 to James Watson, a Middlesbrough solicitor who sued them for false imprisonment after being detained for almost 30 hours.

In January 2019, Chief Constable Mike Veale resigned after being referred to the Independent Office for Police Conduct (IOPC) on a matter of "serious allegations" of misconduct.

== Shared services ==
Cleveland Police shares a number of specialist policing services with other police forces.

=== Specialist Operations Unit ===
In 2010, Cleveland Police and the neighbouring Durham Constabulary merged firearms and roads policing teams, forming the Cleveland and Durham Specialist Operations Unit with bases in Spennymoor and Wynyard. Police vehicles used as part of this partnership feature both the crests of Cleveland Police and the Durham Constabulary.This partnership has since ended and both forces now display their own force badges on RPU vehicles.

=== Dogs ===
Cleveland Police and the Durham Constabulary also merged their dog sections, followed by North Yorkshire Police joining the two forces. The merged dog section launched in August 2016 as part of an initiative for cross-border collaboration between the three forces. The collaboration ended in December 2019 and the three forces returned to having their own independent dog sections.

=== Force helicopter ===
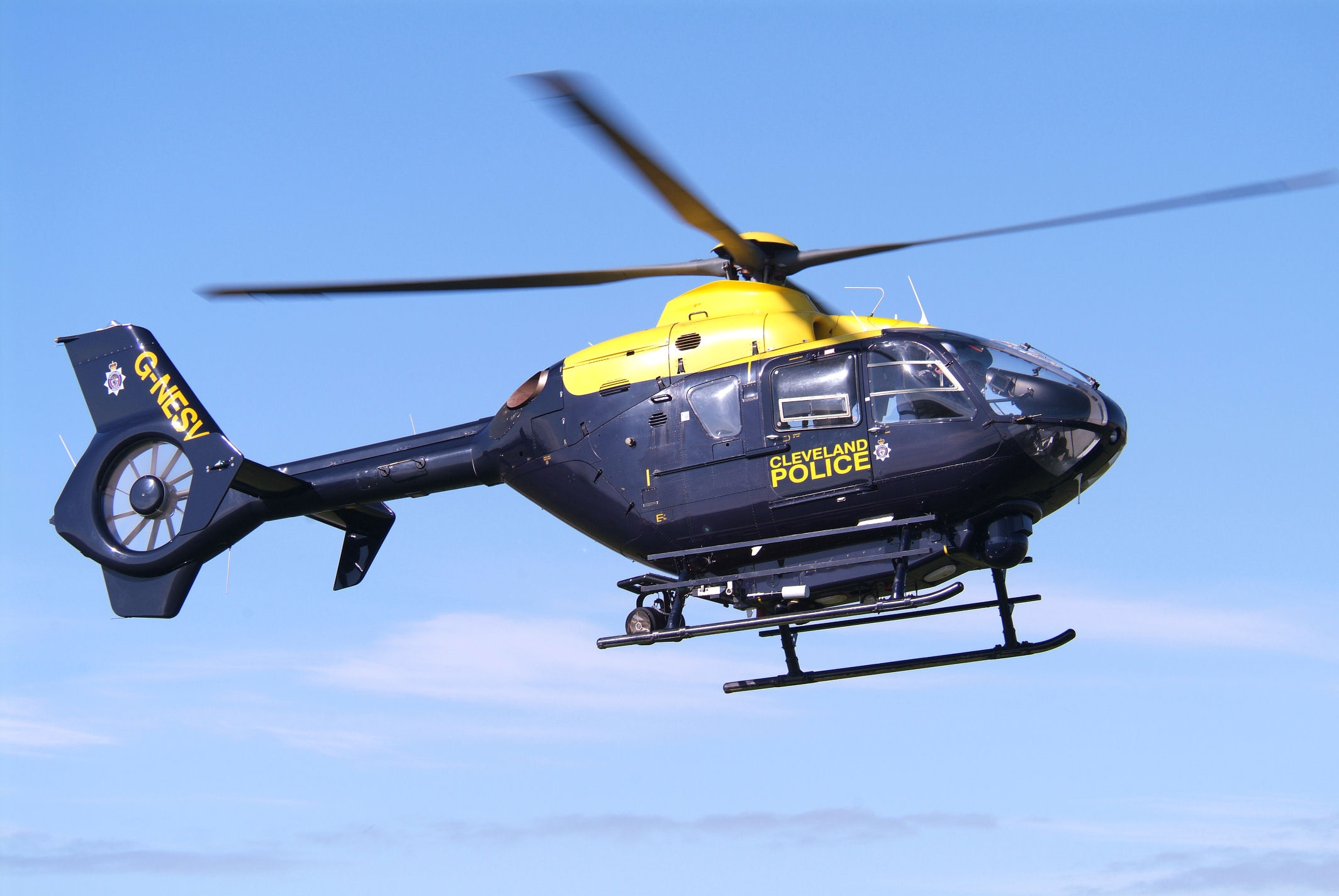
Eurocopter EC-135 G-NESV of the Cleveland Police.

Cleveland was previously a member of the North East Air Support Unit helicopter sharing agreement with neighbouring Durham Constabulary and Northumbria Police in which all three forces shared two helicopters, one based at Newcastle Airport and the other at Teesside Airport.

In 2008, Durham and Northumbria decided that just one helicopter based at Newcastle Airport would be enough. Cleveland disagreed saying that this resource would be based many miles away from Cleveland and would leave it at a disadvantage, and would not agree to the proposal. As a result, Durham and Northumbria decided to leave the consortium of the three forces and forge a new agreement without Cleveland, leaving Cleveland to fund its own helicopter from 2009, when the former North East Air Support Unit agreement officially ended, and the Cleveland Air Operations Unit was formed.

The Cleveland Air Operations Unit was officially declared operational on 1 April 2009. The helicopter was based at Durham Tees Valley Airport. It was:

- Eurocopter EC135T1, registration G-NESV. 2010–2012 Eurocopter EC135P2, registration G-CPAS. Its police call sign was "India 55".

The helicopter supported numerous areas of operational policing such as providing video footage, which was vital in directing officers and other emergency services during major incidents. This technology also enabled the police to capture evidence effectively. The aircraft was equipped with thermal imaging cameras for locating criminals and missing people. The helicopter was also called on to transport people with life-threatening injuries to hospital, when the Great North Air Ambulance was unavailable. The helicopter unit appeared on Channel 5's Interceptor programme alongside their ground-based colleagues. The last section of filming took place over the end of 2015 and into the start of 2016.

==== Transfer to a national service ====
In 2010, the chief constables of all of England and Wales' police forces agreed to pool resources and create the National Police Air Service. Under this framework, it was announced that bases and helicopters would be shared across force boundaries with a model to reduce from 31 bases down to 22. In February 2015, it was announced that this reduction would cut further with a move towards 15 national locations with the Cleveland Police helicopter becoming surplus to requirements in the 2016/2017 financial year.

== See also ==
- Cleveland Fire Brigade
- List of law enforcement agencies in the United Kingdom, Crown Dependencies and British Overseas Territories
- Law enforcement in the United Kingdom
