= Bob Fischer (broadcaster) =

British writer, broadcaster and performer

Robert (Bob) Fischer (born 15 November 1972) is a British broadcaster, writer and performer. As a regional broadcaster he is best known as a DJ and radio presenter for BBC Tees, as a writer for writing the book Wiffle Lever To Full! (2009), and a columnist for the Fortean Times in the area of Hauntology.

== Early life ==
Fischer was born on 15 November 1972 in Middlesbrough, in north east England. He attended Levendale Primary School and Conyers' School in Yarm, before going on to read Linguistics at Lancaster University.. He changed programmes, and subsequently completed a degree in Philosophy.

== Career ==
Fischer was a presenter for BBC Tees in the north east of England until Spring 2020. Latterly he presented a three-times-weekly evening show mixing music, arts and culture, which often featured local musicians, performers and writers. He has previously also presented shows during daytime and weekends. For a number of years he also fronted the station's BBC Introducing output, and remains a well-known figure in the local music and arts scene. As well as presenting, he also produced a documentary for the station about local folklore for the station in 2014, Worms, Witches and Boggarts. He has also been a guest presenter on BBC Radio 6 Music.

His first book, Wiffle Lever to Full!, first published in 2009, is a mix of travelogue and memoir, talking about his childhood love of science fiction, revisiting it as an adult by attending a number of fan conventions and recording the experience.

His regular column for the Fortean Times began following positive reception for an article he wrote for the publication, The Haunted Generation, about unsettling elements of children's television in the 1970s and 1980s. He also writes for the magazines Doctor Who Magazine, and Electronic Sound.

In 2018, together with the writer Andrew T Smith, he co-wrote and performed in the show Summer Winos, about the television show Last of the Summer Wine at the Edinburgh Fringe, and subsequently on a national tour into 2019.

He is the co-founder of Mulgrave Audio, a producer of audio drama, whose first release, Simon Perkins' Lurgy, features the voice talents of Ethan Warren, and Roger Limb.

He has hosted occasional live shows under the Chinwag banner, featuring Q&A sessions with performers such as Ray Brooks and Reece Dinsdale.

He also acts as host for live shows under the banner Scarred For Life, with the authors Stephen Brotherstone and Dave Lawrence, again about the hauntological aspects of 1970s and 1980s broadcast media.

He has appeared as a guest on several podcasts, including the cultural commentator and writer Tim Worthington's Looks Unfamiliar in May 2019. and August 2020.
