= William Peckitt =

William Peckitt (1731 – 14 October 1795) was an English glass-painter and stained glass maker. He was based in York throughout his working life, was one of the leading Georgian glass craftsmen in England and helped "keep the art of glass painting alive during the eighteenth century". In fact, "it was William Peckitt who did most of the stained glass and painted glass work that survives from the second half of the eighteenth century".

== Biography ==
William Peckitt was born in Husthwaite, a village near Easingwold, 15 miles northwest of York, and was baptised on 13 April 1731; his parents were William, a fellmonger and glove maker, and Ann. The family moved to York sometime prior to 1752 where Peckitt worked in his father's glove making business before establishing himself as a glass painter in Colliergate, York.

He married Mary Mitley, daughter of the sculptor Charles Mitley, on 3 April 1763, and the couple had four daughters. Peckitt worked throughout his life on the maintenance of the medieval glass in York Minster as well as painting new windows there. He also undertook commissions for cathedrals, churches and houses throughout England. He produced windows for a number of colleges including the "fabulous" Alma Mater window for Trinity College. He died on 14 October 1795 and is buried in the church of St Martin-cum-Gregory, York. His wife made a memorial window to him in the church and it is placed next to a memorial to two of his daughters by Peckitt himself.

== Glass painting and stained glass ==
By Peckitt's time, the medieval art of manufacturing stained glass had been lost and "all that survived were the painting of enamels on to glass and the process of silver staining". Although most of the work produced by Peckitt was painted glass he did experiment with stained glass and produced windows incorporating it, unlike his contemporaries. He "realised that colour is the sine qua non of Stained Glass". He continued these experiments throughout his life and in 1780 he patented an invention "for blending Coloured and Stained Glass". Although his contributions to the technical development of the craft have been well recognised and documented his draughtsmanship has sometimes been criticised;" his work has little merit in either design or colour". He attempted to resolve this by employing established draughtsmen such as the Italians Biagio Rebecca and Giovanni Battista Cipriani to draw cartoons for him.

== Examples of his work ==
There are a number of examples of Peckitt's work in England and some of the more important are listed below.

=== Yorkshire (old boundaries) ===
- Boynton, St Andrew's Church. Heraldic and mosaic work. 1768.
- Burton Agnes Hall. Window of Roger de Somerville.
- Coxwold, St Michael. Heraldic glass.
- Church of St Helen, Denton. Church.
- Harpham, St John of Beverley. Windows in St Quentin family Chapel.1771.
- Ripley Castle. The Staircase Hall is lit by a Venetian window with armorial glass. 1784 - 85
- Yarm, St Mary Magdalen. Moses window in the south aisle . 1763.
- York Minster. Several windows including Abraham and Solomon in the south transept. He carried out the resetting of, and repair to, the medieval glass throughout his life and painted the central sunburst motif to the rose window in the south transept.
- York, St Martin-cum-Gregory. Memorial window to his daughters.
- York City Art Gallery. Several examples of his work.

=== Rest of England ===
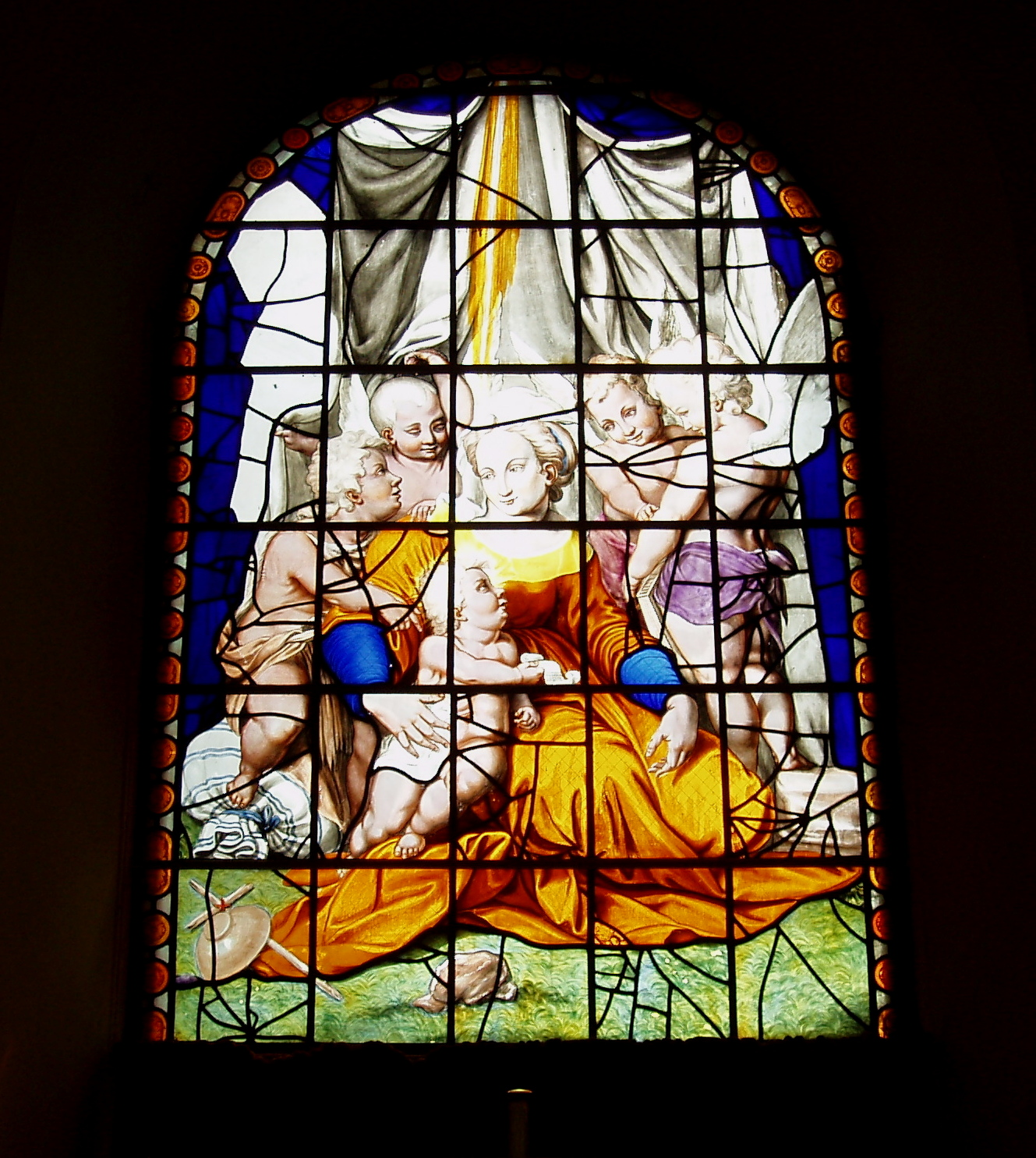
St Bartholomew's Binley - east window

- Binley, St Bartholomew. The east window is of the Virgin and Child.
- Cambridge, Trinity College library. The Alma Mater window on the south side of the library. The window shows an allegorical scene of Sir Isaac Newton being presented by the Muse of the College to King George III with Francis Bacon looking on. It was designed by Giovanni Battista Cipriani. 1771.
- Cambridgeshire, Hinchingbrooke House. Armorial window.
- Essex, Audley End House. Window of Last supper.
- Gloucestershire, Matson House. Window with three panels in the Oratory, depicting the figures of 2 friars and a nun. 1785.
- Lincoln Cathedral. North end of the north east transept. 1762
- London, Strawberry Hill. Two cycles of armorial windows for the Gallery in a painted and enameled mosaic setting and 'the yellow Star in the ceiling of the Cabinet' (1762) and the Great North Bedchamber set in clear glass with coloured glass frames (1772). While the glass in the Great North Bedchamber remains in place, that commissioned for the Gallery was sold out of the house in 1842 and the star for the Tribune or Cabinet recorded by photograph was probably destroyed by the 1953 fire.
- Manchester - St Ann. Window of apostle in the north aisle.
- Norfolk, Holkham Hall. Window with coat of arms. 1769.
- Oxford, Oriel College. Window in the chapel of The Presentation of Christ in the Temple. It was originally in the east window but is now in the south. 1767.
- Oxford, New College. Windows of apostles and saints on the north side of the chancel.
