= Yarm School =

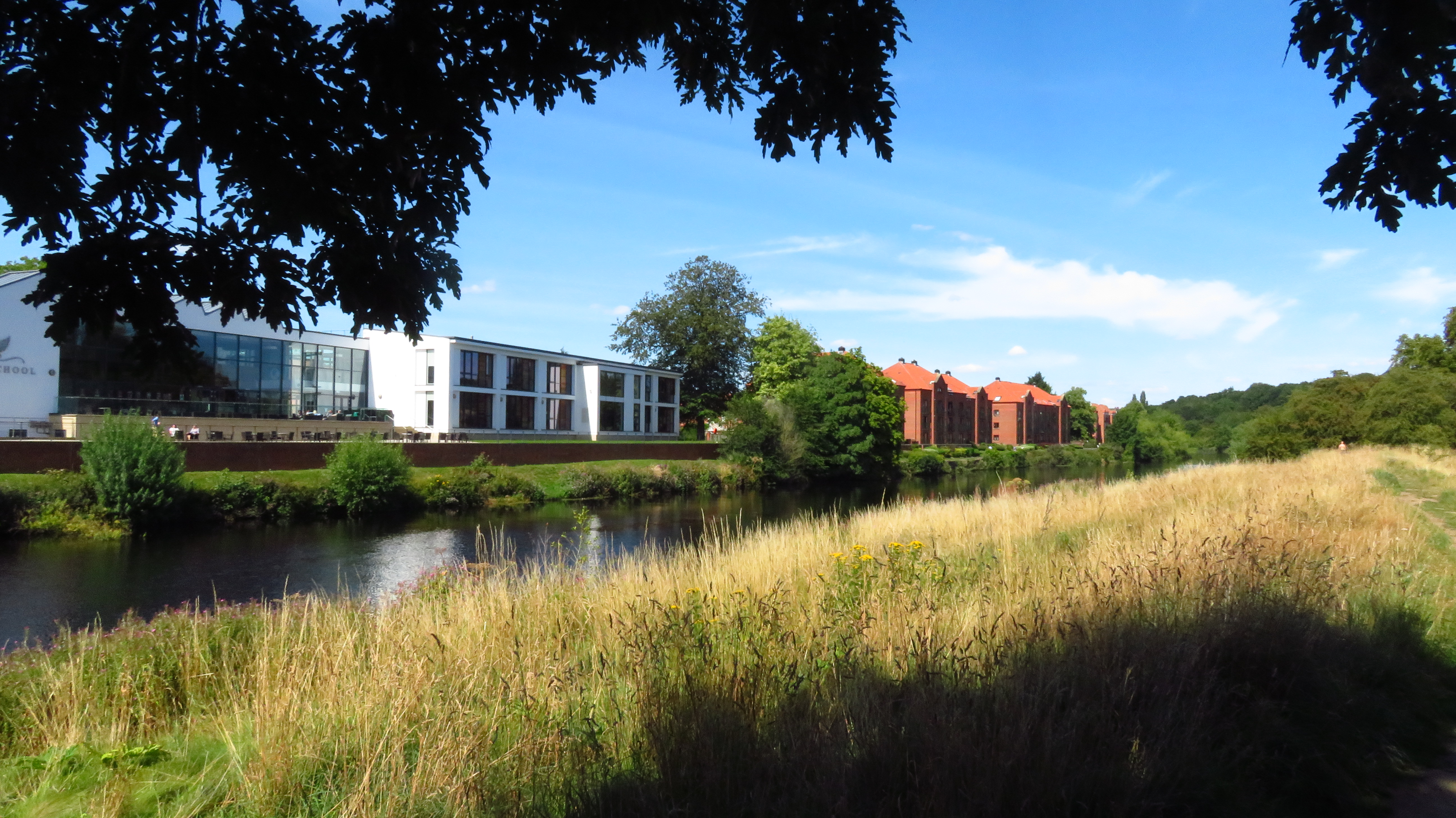
- The school (white building) from the other side of the river

Location
- The Friarage; Yarm, Stockton-on-Tees, TS15 9EJ; England; 54.50670°N 1.35202°W

Information
- Type: Private school Day School
- Motto: Educating for Life
- Religious affiliation: Church of England
- Established: 1978; 48 years ago
- Founder: R. Neville Tate OBE
- Department for Education URN: 111769 Tables
- Headmaster: Huw Williams
- Gender: Co-educational
- Age: 3 to 18
- Enrolment: c1200
Colour
- Alumni: Old Yarmurians
- Website: http://www.yarmschool.org

Yarm School is a co-educational private day school in Yarm, North Yorkshire in the North East of England. The school accepts pupils aged 3–18 years old and has a Nursery Pre-Prep, Preparatory School, Senior School and Sixth Form. The school was founded in 1978 and is a member of the Headmasters' and Headmistresses' Conference.

Yarm School is in the market town of Yarm, on the edge of the Teesside conurbation. The Senior School and Sixth Form border the River Tees and are off Yarm High Street. The Preparatory School is located on the opposite side of The Spital, not far from the High Street.

== History ==
Founded in 1978 as an independent day school for boys. The School was opened under the headship of R. Neville Tate and was located on the site of Yarm Parish Church, as well as an additional three acres of land all on the Spital road.

These buildings had previously housed a Free Grammar School that had been providing education to disadvantaged boys since 1590. A new comprehensive, Conyers' School, which succeeded the ancient Grammar School decided to move site, which it did in 1977. The next year, Yarm School was founded on the site and remained there until September 1980, when it moved to The Friarage on the west bank of the River Tees. At the same time, the buildings on The Spital were used to create Yarm Preparatory School. The two schools was then educating boys from the age of 3 upwards.

In 2001, Yarm School became fully co-educational. In 2006, the school expanded further with the acquisition of Raventhorpe Preparatory School which became the satellite feeder school called Yarm at Raventhorpe. However, in January 2013 it was announced that Yarm at Raventhorpe would be closed. This is because the school was no longer financially viable. All Yarm at Raventhorpe pupils were offered places at Yarm Preparatory School.

In 2009 a £20 million redevelopment plan won approval by Stockton Council – and with it, a potential boost to the Teesside economy.

The School underwent significant developments in the years to follow, including new classrooms, improved dining and kitchen facilities, sporting facilities like a boat house and fitness suite, and a 750-seat auditorium.

R. Neville Tate was Headmaster of Yarm School until 1999 when David Dunn was appointed. Dunn stepped down in 2019 and Dr Huw Williams took on the position.

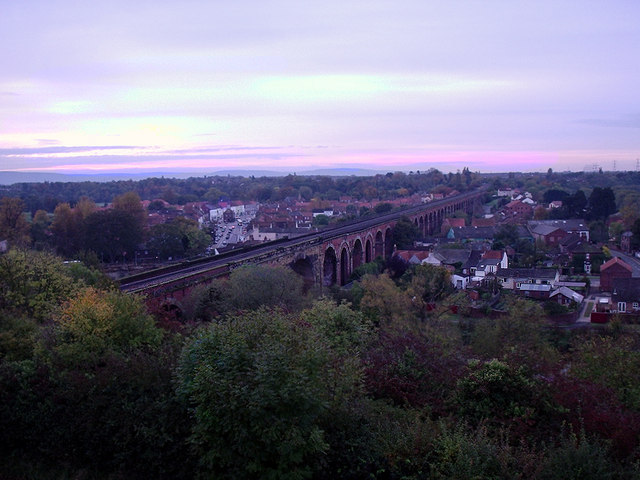
Full View of Yarm.

=== School buildings ===
The school originated in the buildings which are now the Preparatory School, before moving into the current Friarage building when the older buildings became too small to accommodate the expanding pupil body. The Friarage building is a large Georgian manor house, that was built after the demolition of the Dominican Friary which had existed there from the 12th till the 16th century. Some parts of the old friary still survive – for example, the oldest building in Yarm is located on the school grounds – the Dovecote was originally part of the Dominican Friarage, and was built in the 12th century to provide a source of food for the monks. The current Sixth Form common rooms are in the old Friarage stable block, which was built as part of the Georgian development – the original coach archways are still visible.

In the 1990s, further expansion of the school resulted in the building of the 'Tate Building' for science and technology, named after the founding headmaster, R. Neville Tate. At the same time, the 'Hunt Building' for History, Geography and English was built, named after and opened by the former governor of the Falkland Islands, Sir Rex Hunt. In conjunction with the 'Hunt building' the school also opened a new theatre, which was opened by Lord Briggs. Since the school's expansion in 2009, this has been turned into the school refectory.

In 2009, the School was granted permission to build £20 million worth of new facilities to the school's existing site. Whilst there were developments to the preparatory school such as the building of new multi-use sports pitches and extending the school's pre-prep facilities, the majority of investment was on the School's main site by the river. This included the development of a new dining hall and construction of new class rooms alongside the riverside. The school invited Princess Alexandra to open its auditorium. The school has received praise for the new development from the Royal Institute of British Architects. The new development houses classrooms for English, Modern Languages and Economics.

== Curriculum ==
The school teaches subjects towards the International General Certificate of Secondary Education and GCSE qualifications, including English Language and English Literature, Mathematics, Sciences, and Languages (at least one of French, German, Spanish, or Latin). Aside from compulsory subjects, students are able to study History, Geography, Classics, Religious Studies, Music, Art, Computer Science and Design Technology (specialising in Electronics, Resistant Materials and Textiles). Some GCSEs can be studied outside of curriculum time, including General Studies and Russian.

Yarm Sixth Form requires all students to take at least 3 A-Level subjects (Four A-Levels can be taken if Further Mathematics is included with Mathematics) and includes Extended Project Qualification in the curriculum. A-levels are taken in Humanities, sciences, creative arts and social sciences

In 2012 the school was listed for A-levels, as the 20th most successful independent school in the country by The Independent. In 2019 Yarm School was recognised as the top performing school in Teesside and County Durham for its A-level results by The Gazette.

Sports include rowing, rugby, cricket, hockey, netball, rounders, football, tennis, kayaking, climbing and canoeing; partaking in sport or outdoor education is compulsory.

== Extra-curricular activities ==
=== Sport ===
In July 2009 a team of cyclists from the school won the over-16 category of the British Schools Cycling Association National 10 miles (16.1 km) Time Trial Championships. The school has a rugby tradition and maintains links with the 'Yarm Old Boys' rugby team. On 23 March 2013 the 1st XV won the U18 Daily Mail Vase against Felsted School 17–15 at Twickenham.

The school also has a competition boat club, the Yarm School Boat Club. In 2022 it won 11 events over the two-day Durham Regatta and has performed successfully at the National Schools' Regatta, with a bronze medal in 2014 with the J15 1st 8+. Yarm School won a bronze medal in the J15 4+ at the 2022 National Schools Regatta. It has also been represented at Henley Royal Regatta. There have been impressive results at national events like Henley Women's Regatta, with a semifinal in the J16 4+ in 2021.

=== Outdoor education ===
The school has an outdoor education department which organises games, activities (such as canoeing, kayaking, fire building and bushcraft) and school expeditions.

=== Combined Cadet Force ===
The cadets represent Yarm School parade on Armistice Day in front of Yarm Town Hall, to commemorate the lives of service personnel who died in the Second Boer War, First World War, Second World War and the Korean War.

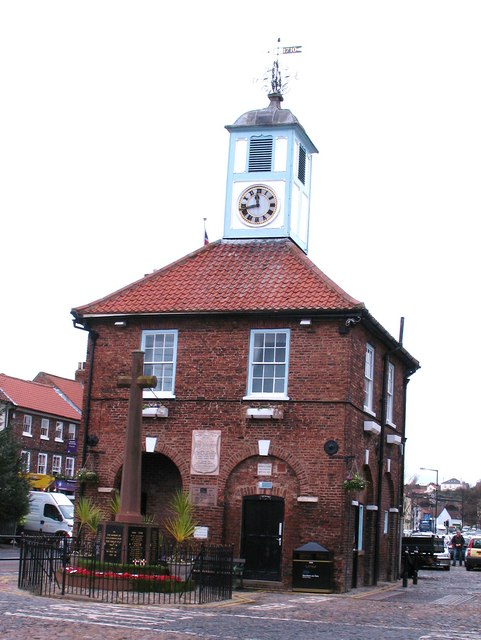
Yarm Town Hall and War Memorial

== News ==
In December 2006 two former pupils added a graffito of a penis on the roof of the Friarage building, which was recorded by Google Earth. The graffito has since been removed.

== Notable alumni ==
=== Politics ===
- Simon Clarke – Conservative MP for Middlesbrough South and East Cleveland
- Femi Oluwole – activist
- Lord Wharton – Conservative MP 2010–17 for Stockton South and Parliamentary Under Secretary of State for Communities and Local Government 2015–16 and DFID 2016–2017; member of the House of Lords

=== Sport ===
- Ben Gibson – footballer
- Simon Webster – Rugby Union player
- Paul Johnston – cricketer
- Russell Earnshaw – Rugby Union player
- Katherine Copeland MBE – GB rowing; Olympic gold medallist
- Will Kay – Rugby Union player
- Zach Kibirige – Rugby Union player
- Ben Stevenson – Rugby Union player
