= Omphale (horse) =

British Thoroughbred racehorse

- Sire: Highflyer
- Grandsire: Herod
- Dam: Calliope
- Damsire: Slouch
- Sex: Mare
- Foaled: 1781
- Country: Kingdom of Great Britain
- Colour: Bay
- Breeder: John Coates
- Owner: John Coates
- Trainer: Thomas Burdon
- Record: 8: 3-2-3

Major wins
- St. Leger Stakes (1784)

Omphale (1781–1799) was a British Thoroughbred racehorse and broodmare that won the 1784 St. Leger Stakes.

== Background ==
Omphale was bred by John Coates and was foaled in 1781 at his stud at Castle Leavington near Yarm. She was sired by Highflyer, an undefeated son of Herod that stood at Richard Tattersall's Red Barns near Bury St. Edmunds. Omphale's dam, Calliope, was bred by Mr. Coates and produced ten foals between 1770 and 1788, with Omphale being her sixth foal and the only one sired by Highflyer. Calliope also produced the good racers Orpheus, Duchess and Whitelegs for Mr. Coates. Calliope was barren for five years before she produced Omphale.

Omphale was trained by Thomas Burdon. She is described as being "amiss" during the year preceding her St. Leger win and had only had nine weeks of formal training before the running.

== Racing career ==
On 28 September at Doncaster, Omphale beat Mr. Hutton's colt Harlequin Junior and five other horses to win the ninth running of the St. Leger Stakes. This was her first and only start in 1784. Returning as a four-year-old on 24 May 1785 at Milfield in Northumberland, Omphale finished third and last in a race run over two, two-mile heats, finishing second in the first heat and last in the second heat. On 24 June 1785 at Newcastle-upon-Tyne, Omphale won the £50 Corporation Purse run over two-mile heats, beating Oak Apple. At York on 20 August, she received a forfeit from Mr. G. Snowden when his filly sired by North Star backed out of a match race. On 7 September, Omphale won a sweepstakes race at Richmond. A few weeks later at Doncaster, Omphale was third in a race run over four, two-mile heats. In June 1786 at Hexham, she finished second to Blackbird in a match race run over two, four-mile heats and a few days later was second in the His Majesty's Plate at Newcastle-upon-Tyne. She was third in the final race of her career, the His Majesty's Plate run on 21 August at York, losing to Lady Teazle and Columbine.

== Breeding career ==
Omphale was retired from racing in 1787. Omphale produced three colts and four fillies between 1788 and 1799 during her breeding career. She died in 1799.

=== Progeny ===
- 1788- Corporal, chestnut colt sired by King Fergus.
- 1790- Bay filly by Phenomenon.
- 1791- Curranto, bay colt by Young Morwick
- 1792- Tarquin, bay colt by Ruler
- 1793- Bay filly by Young Marske.
- 1794- Lopcatcher, bay filly by Young Marske.
- 1797- Hyale, bay filly by Pipator.
