= Zach Kibirige =

English rugby union player (born 1994)

- Full name: Zach Kasule Kibirige
- Born: 28 October 1994 (age 32) Middlesbrough, England
- Height: 1.77 m (5 ft 10 in)
- Weight: 89 kg (14 st 0 lb)
- School: Yarm School

Rugby union career
- Position: Wing
Senior career
Years	Team	Apps	(Points)
2012–2019	Newcastle Falcons	40	(115)
2019−2022	Wasps	68	(80)
2023	Western Force	11	(40)
2023-	Biarritz Olympique	42	(110)
- Correct as of 11 July 2023
International career
Years	Team	Apps	(Points)
2013–2014	England U20	4	(15)
National sevens team
Years	Team		Comps
2014–2015	England		(1)

Zach Kibirige (born 28 October 1994) is an English professional rugby union player.

== Biography ==
Born in Middlesbrough, Kibirige grew up as the youngest of five children in Yarm. Zach attended Yarm School in Yarm, Teesside, where he gained 3 A's at A Level. He is currently reading Psychology at the Open University.

Kibirige is an ambassador for the Dallaglio Foundation and is involved in the Falcons Community Foundation.

== Personal life ==
Kibirige is the son of Dr Mohammed Kibirige, a retired consultant paediatrician who worked at James Cook University Hospital.

On 9 August 2016 Kibirige was cleared by a jury, of charges of rape, by a unanimous verdict at Newcastle Crown Court. Following the verdict Newcastle Falcons released the following statement:

"Newcastle Falcons have welcomed the not-guilty verdict in the trial of Zach Kibirige. The club have been aware of the allegations hanging over Zach since his initial arrest (he faced charges of sexual assault). This has been an extremely stressful time for Zach, and his hugely promising rugby career has effectively been put on hold during this very difficult period. The club are satisfied that their faith in Zach has been borne out by the verdict in his trial. Zach remains an important member of the club’s playing staff and is available for all rugby and non-rugby-related duties. Newcastle Falcons will be making no further comment on this matter".

== Playing career ==
Kibirige began his career playing junior rugby with his local club Darlington RFC and at Yarm school.

Kibirige then joined Newcastle Falcons at age 12, and made his senior debut for the club at the age of 17, where he is recognised for his speed and attacking prowess. In December 2012, Zach signed his first professional contract with Newcastle Falcons, at age 18.

International Career: Kibirige represented his country at Under 17, 18 and 20's level. In summer 2015, Kibirige was called up to the England Sevens side for the Rugby European Sevens Grand Prix Series event in Lyon, France.
