= 1784 in sports =

1784 in sports describes the year's events in world sport.

== Boxing ==
Events

- March — Tom Johnson defeated Croydon Drover in London after 27 minutes.
- June — Tom Johnson defeated Stephen " Death " Oliver at Blackheath in a 35-minute fight. It's unknown if this was for the championship or not.

== Cricket ==
Events

- First known appearance of a team representing the White Conduit Club, forerunner of Marylebone Cricket Club (MCC)

England

- Most runs – James Aylward 55
- Most wickets – William Bullen 8

== Horse racing ==
England

- The Derby – Serjeant
- The Oaks – Stella
- St Leger Stakes – Omphale
