= HM Prison Kirklevington Grange =

Men's prison in North Yorkshire, England

HMP Kirklevington Grange
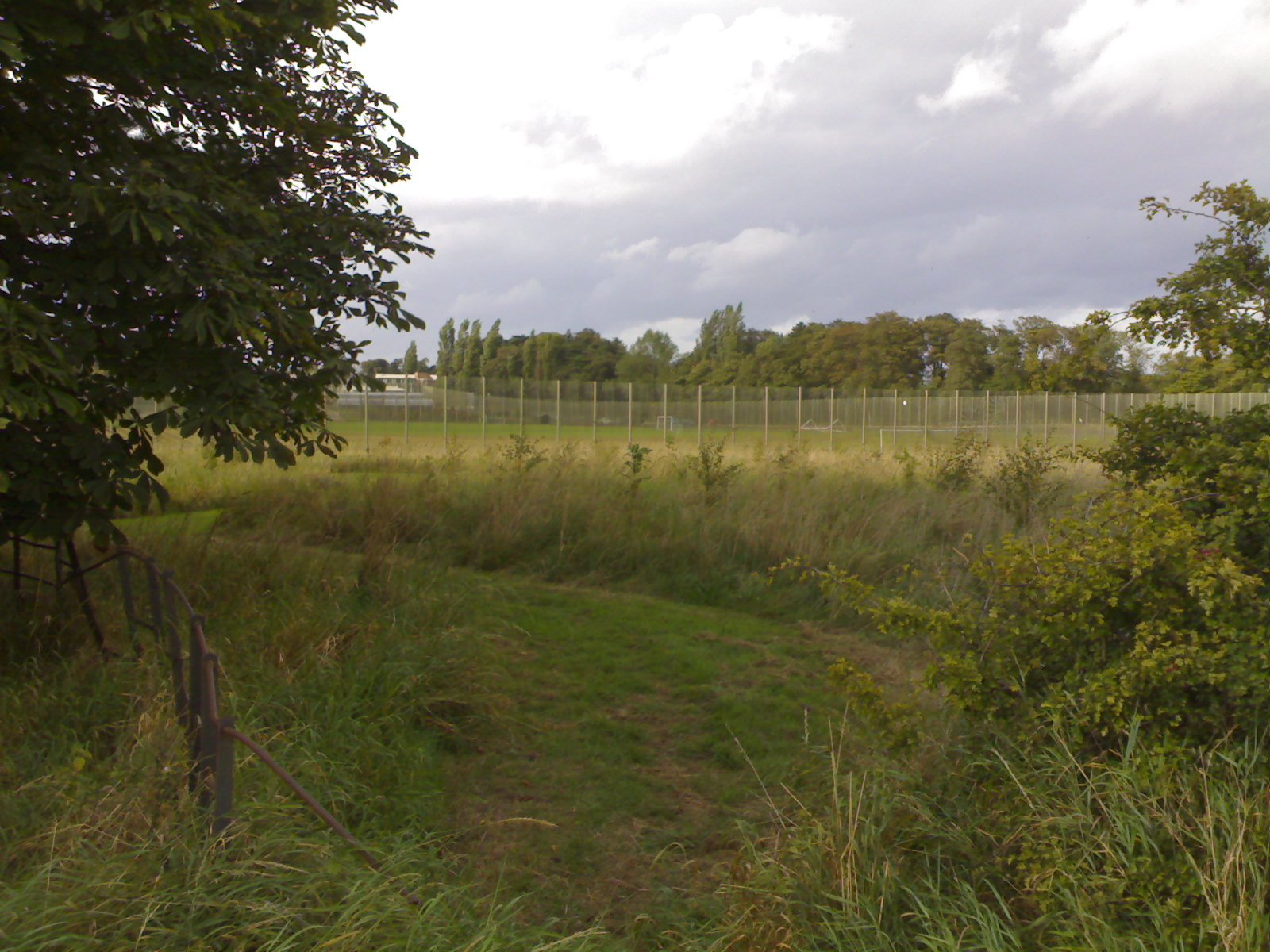
- The rear of Kirklevington Grange
- Interactive map of HMP Kirklevington Grange
- Location: Kirklevington, North Yorkshire; 54°29′42″N 1°20′23″W
- Security class: Adult Male/Category D
- Capacity: 303
- Population: 273 (January 2015)
- Opened: 1962 (as a junior detention centre); 1992 (as an adult resettlement prison)
- Managed by: HM Prison Services
- Governor: Phil Husband OBE
- Website: Kirklevington Grange at justice.gov.uk

HM Prison Kirklevington Grange is a Category D men's prison, located in the village of Kirklevington (near Yarm), in North Yorkshire, England. The prison is operated by His Majesty's Prison Service.

== History ==
Kirklevington Grange Prison was originally opened in 1962 as a junior detention centre. In 1988 it became a young offender institution. It closed in 1992, and in October of that year reopened as a resettlement prison for adult male offenders nearing the end of their incarceration. As such it is an open prison housing Category D prisoners.

In March 2004 the Independent Monitoring Board issued a report on Kirklevington Grange praising the fair and respectful atmosphere at the prison, despite a 22% rise in the number of inmates. The Board also commended the good links between the prison and the local population and the access to job centres for the prisoners.

In January 2006 an inspection report from Her Majesty's Chief Inspector of Prisons praised Kirklevington Grange for its excellent resettlement work. The report also praised the positive attitude amongst staff at the prison. However the report recommended that the quality and range of work opportunities for prisoners should be improved at the jail.

A 2011 report following inspection of the prison found that it was a safe environment with a high standard achieved in diversity work, health care and catering. At that time, 47 prisoners were classified as Category C, with 231 in Category D, with the prison being a venue for assessment as to whether Category C inmates could be progressed to the more liberal Category D regime. By 2015 all inmates were Category D.

In January 2014 a prisoner absconded from the prison; he was arrested the following day in nearby Eaglescliffe.

In May 2024, the Ministry of Justice announced plans to add a further 152 places at Kirklevington Grange.

== The prison today ==
Kirklevington Grange is a resettlement prison for Category D adult male offenders nearing the end of their sentences, who are intending to settle in the north-east of England. Accommodation at the prison comprises single rooms with fitted storage cupboards. All rooms have privacy locks, having their own key.

The prison's aim is to prepare inmates for their release. Prisoners are encouraged to maintain and develop links with families and the wider community. Prisoners can, in the final stages of their sentence, progress to working out of the prison in full-time employment or voluntary community work. The prisoners operate a cafe and car wash, both of which are outside the prison fence and serve the general public.

A Parkrun event, run on the closed land inside the prison fence, began operating in May 2019.

== Kirklevington Grange ==
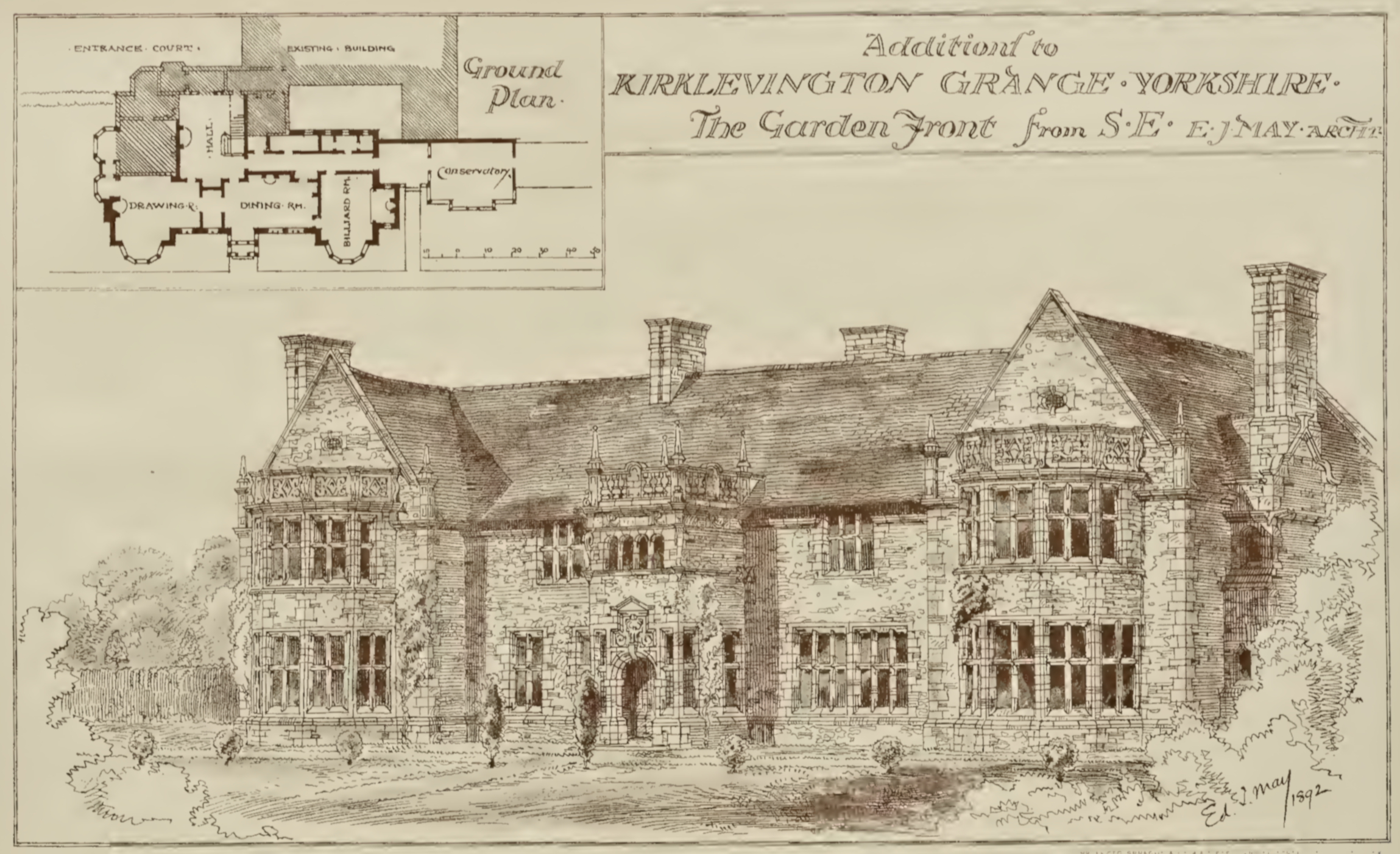
Kirklevington Grange

Kirklevington Grange was a country house remodelled and extended in 1892–1898 to designs by E. J. May. The structure, which is listed as a Grade II building, is now incorporated into the main prison complex.

== Notable inmates ==
- Andy Ferrell, former professional footballer who received a four-year sentence in 2013 for drug dealing.
