= Yarm Methodist Church =

Church in Yarm, England

Coordinates: 54.508°N 1.354°W

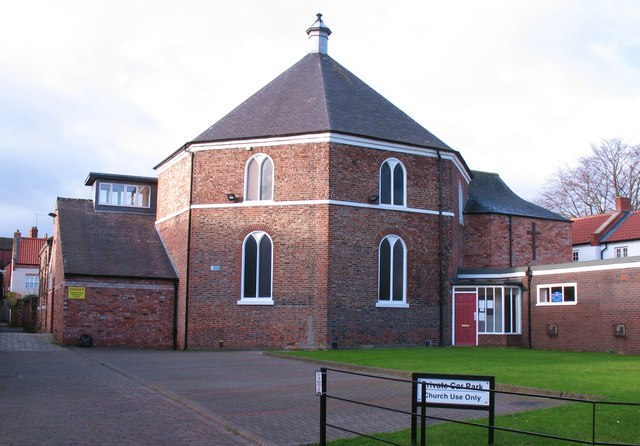
- Yarm Methodist Church
- Denomination: Methodist Church of Great Britain
- Churchmanship: Methodist
- Website: http://stocktonmethodistcircuit.co.uk/yarm

Administration
- District: Darlington

Yarm Methodist Church is a Methodist church in the town of Yarm in the borough of Stockton-on-Tees, England. It is octagonal in shape. Built in 1763, John Wesley wrote in his Journal :

I preached about noon at Potto and in the evening in the New House at Yarm, by far the most elegant in England. A large congregational attended at five in the morning and seemed to be just ripe for the exhortation – Let us go on and perfection.

Administratively, the church is part of the Stockton Circuit in the Darlington district.

The Church has a children's Youth Club for 9 to 18-year-olds, and a mothers and toddlers group.

== See also ==
- St Mary Magdalene, Yarm – the Church of England parish church.
