= Kirklevington =

Village and civil parish in North Yorkshire, England

Coordinates: 54.4812°N 1.3386°W

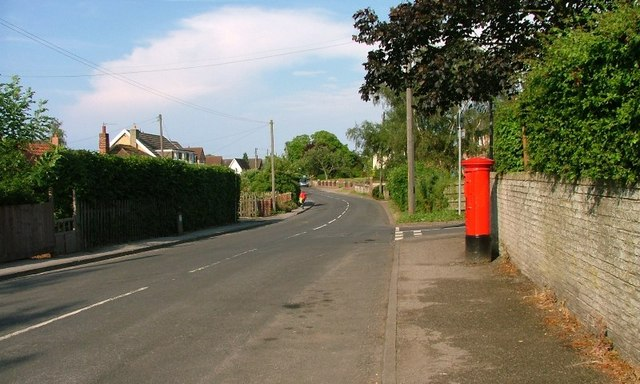

- Location within North Yorkshire
- Population: 809 (village, 2011)
- OS grid reference: NZ429097
- Civil parish: Kirklevington
- Unitary authority: Stockton-on-Tees
- Ceremonial county: North Yorkshire
- Region: North East
- Country: England
- Sovereign state: United Kingdom
- Post town: Yarm
- Postcode district: TS15
- Dialling code: 01642
- Police: Cleveland
- Fire: Cleveland
- Ambulance: North East
- UK Parliament: Stockton South
- Website: Parish council website

Kirklevington (also known as Kirk Leavington) is a village and civil parish in the borough of Stockton-on-Tees, North Yorkshire, England. At the 2011 census, the village had a population of 809.

The civil parish had a population of 1,361. The parish shares a grouped parish council with Castle Levington and is situated south of Yarm. It hosts the town's station.

== History ==
A settlement is listed in the Domesday Book of 1086 as "Levetona", meaning "farmstead on the River Leven" (where "Leven" is of Celtic origin, possibly meaning "smooth"). The appellation "kirk" (old Norse for "church") was adopted later.

Kirk Leavington was historically a parish in the wapentake of Langbaurgh West in the North Riding of Yorkshire. It included the townships of Castlelevington, Picton and Low Worsall, which became separate civil parishes parishes in 1866. It formed part of the Stokesley Rural District from 1894 to 1974, when it became part of the borough of Stockton. The village was once home to the Kirklevington Country Club.

Pieces from the Viking crosses, dating from 10th century, found in Kirklevington, which may have been the centre of a large Anglo-Saxon estate, are on display at Preston Hall Museum in Stockton-on-Tees. Later it was a planned two row green village. Traces of four fields of ridge and furrow marking the possible site of a deserted medieval village are to be found at Red Hall Farm in Castlelevington. The local names of "Castle Hill" and "Castle Levington" refer to a "castle" on the banks of the River Tees 1.25 miles ENE of the village.

== Geography ==
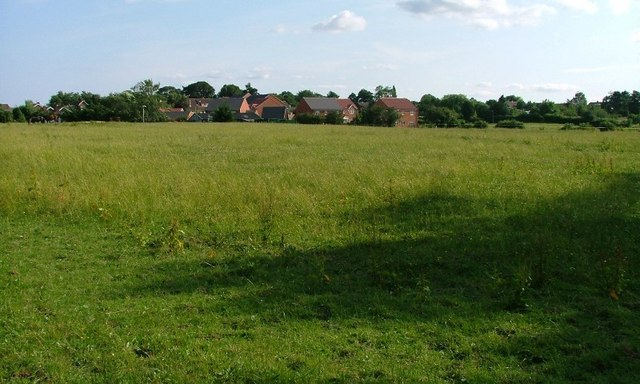
The north edge of Kirklevington

The unusually dispersed village is relatively modern. It includes a church, village hall, a small public park, a primary school, a riding centre at Town End Farm, Vidgen's engineering garage, and a pub, the Crown Hotel. The population is around 800. In July 2017 Stockton Borough Council said that it "is minded " to approve a proposal to build 145 new houses in the village, which would increase the population by about one third.

== Kirklevington Hall ==
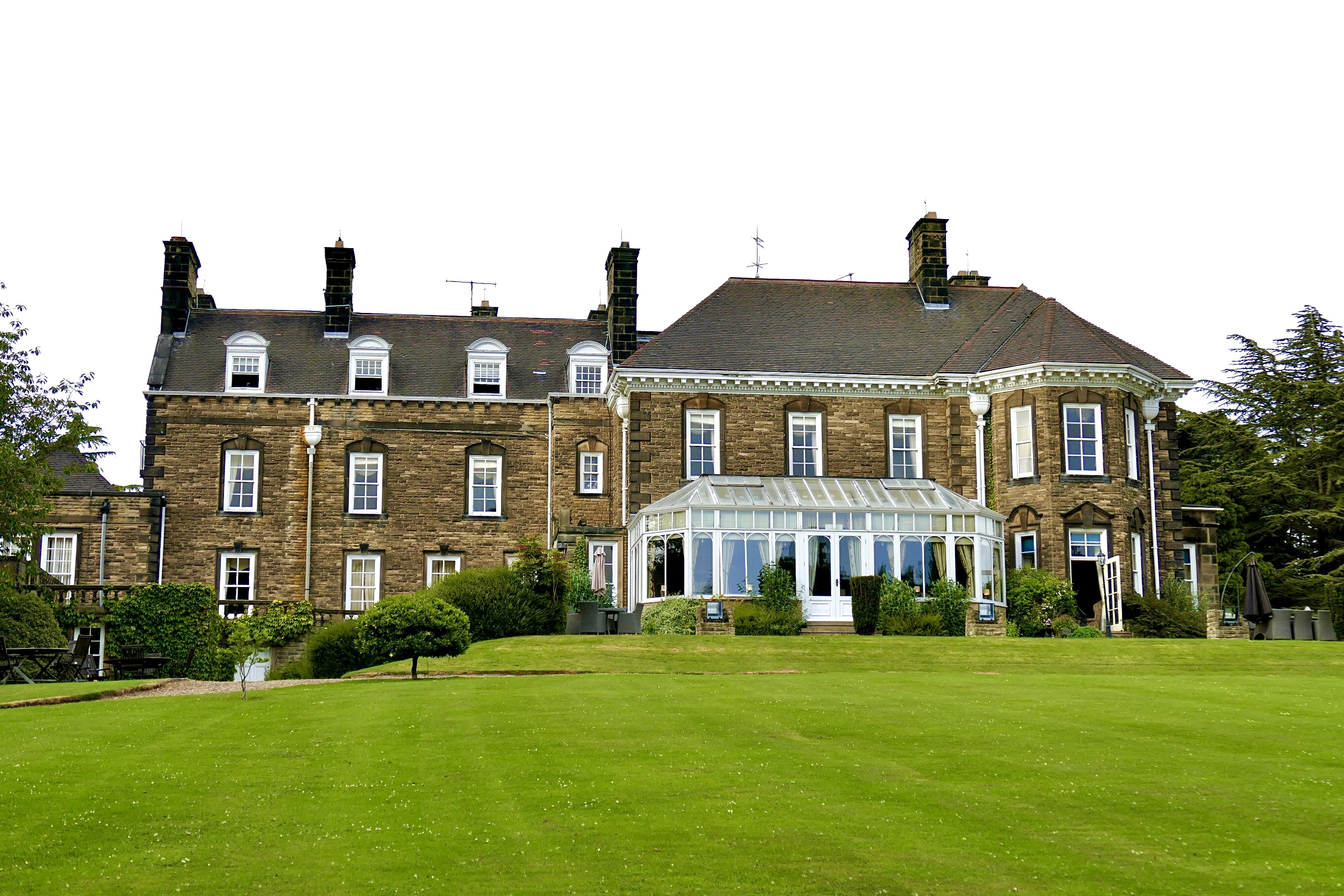
Judges

Kirklevington Hall is about 0.75 miles north of the village. From 1881 the Hall was a family home of the Richardsons of Hartlepool. During the Second World War it was a secret command centre for the North-East. By the mid-1960s it had become the headquarters of 50th (Northumbrian) Division, Territorial Army. In the 1970s and 1980s it was home to judges on the Northeastern Circuit. It was the location of "Judges Country House Hotel", an AA 3 Red Star Country House with 3 Rosettes. At the time of writing this (March 2023), it has closed down and is in the process of being sold.

== Kirklevington Grange ==
On the southern edge of the built up area of Yarm, and about 1.5 miles north of the village, is HMP Kirklevington Grange, a men's resettlement prison for inmates intending to settle (on release) in the North East of England.

== Kirklevington Country Club ==
The village was once home to the famous Kirklevington Country Club, 'The Kirk'.

== Governance ==
=== Parliament ===
Kirklevington, as part of the Stockton South Parliamentary Constituency, was represented in the House of Commons by James Wharton (Conservative), who was elected on 6 May 2010. James Wharton was re-elected with an increased majority on 7 May 2015. In August 2016 he was appointed Parliamentary Under-Secretary of State at the Department for International Development. As a result of the elections on 8 June 2017 Labour's Paul Williams, a local doctor, took over from James Wharton. In 2019, Conservative Matt Vickers won the seat.

=== Borough ===
Kirklevington is part of the Stockton-on-Tees Borough's Yarm ward, represented by three councillors. These councillors were elected as Conservatives on 6 May 2011, Mark Anthony Chatburn later defected to UKIP.

=== Parish Council ===
The Kirklevington and Castle Leavington Parish Council has seven members. It was chaired by Kate Brown for 7 years, however is now chaired by Jennie Beaumont who took her place in May 2017

=== Police ===
Kirklevington falls within the Cleveland Police area. As of April 2014 the police have installed ANPR number plate recognition cameras on the A67 road through the village, recording all vehicular movements 24 hours a day.

== Education ==
Kirklevington Primary School has about 120 pupils.

The nearest secondary school is Conyers School, about 1.5 miles away in Yarm, with approximately 1,300 pupils of ages 11–18.

== Church ==
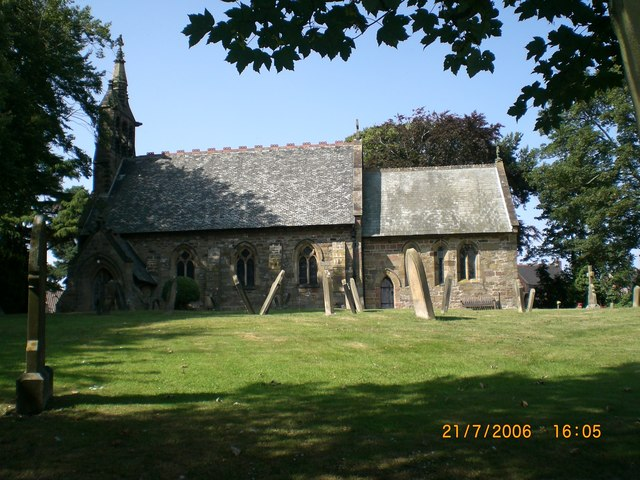
St Martin and St Hilary Church

St Martin Church is located on Forest Lane and Pump Lane and can be viewed from the A67. It is an English Heritage Grade II* Listed Building that was re-built in 1882 but still has parts dated to the 12th and 13th century.

The Church is mainly associated with St Mary Magdalene Yarm and All Saints Worsall however has connections to Crathorne, Hutton Rugby and Middleton.

Service times are:

1st Sunday 08:00 - Holy Communion

2nd Sunday 11:00 - Holy Communion

4th Sunday 11:00 - Family Service (Coffee from 10:30)

Morning Prayer takes place every Thursday at 08:00
