= Castlelevington =

Civil parish near Middlesbrough, England

Coordinates: 54.492°N 1.326°W

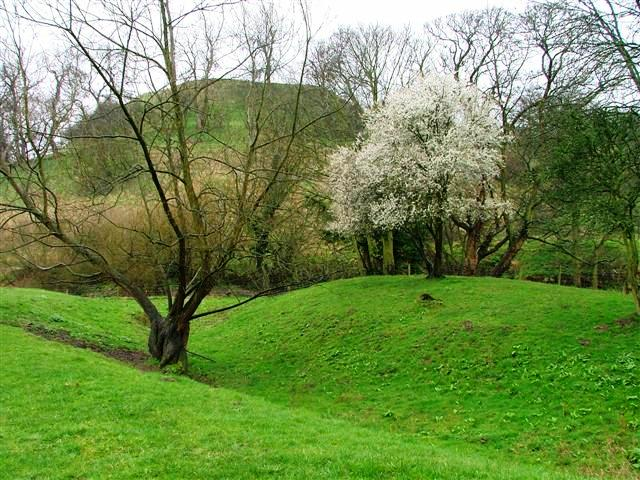
- Castle Hill

- Location within North Yorkshire
- Population: 30 (2001)
- OS grid reference: NZ436109
- Civil parish: Castlelevington
- Unitary authority: Stockton-on-Tees
- Ceremonial county: North Yorkshire
- Region: North East
- Country: England
- Sovereign state: United Kingdom
- Post town: STOCKTON-ON-TEES
- Postcode district: TS15
- Police: Cleveland
- Fire: Cleveland
- Ambulance: North East

Castlelevington (also spelt Castle Leavington) is a civil parish in North Yorkshire, England 2.5 miles (4 km) south south-east of Yarm. The parish is in the borough of Stockton-on-Tees. There is no village in the parish. According to the 2001 census it had a population of 30. At the 2011 census, it remained only minimal.

Castlelevington was historically a township within the parish of Kirklevington in the wapentake of Langbaurgh West in the North Riding of Yorkshire. It became a separate civil parish in 1866. It was part of the Stokesley Rural District from 1894 to 1974, when it became part of the borough of Stockton-on-Tees. It now shares a grouped parish council with Kirklevington, known as Kirklevington and Castle Leavington Parish Council.

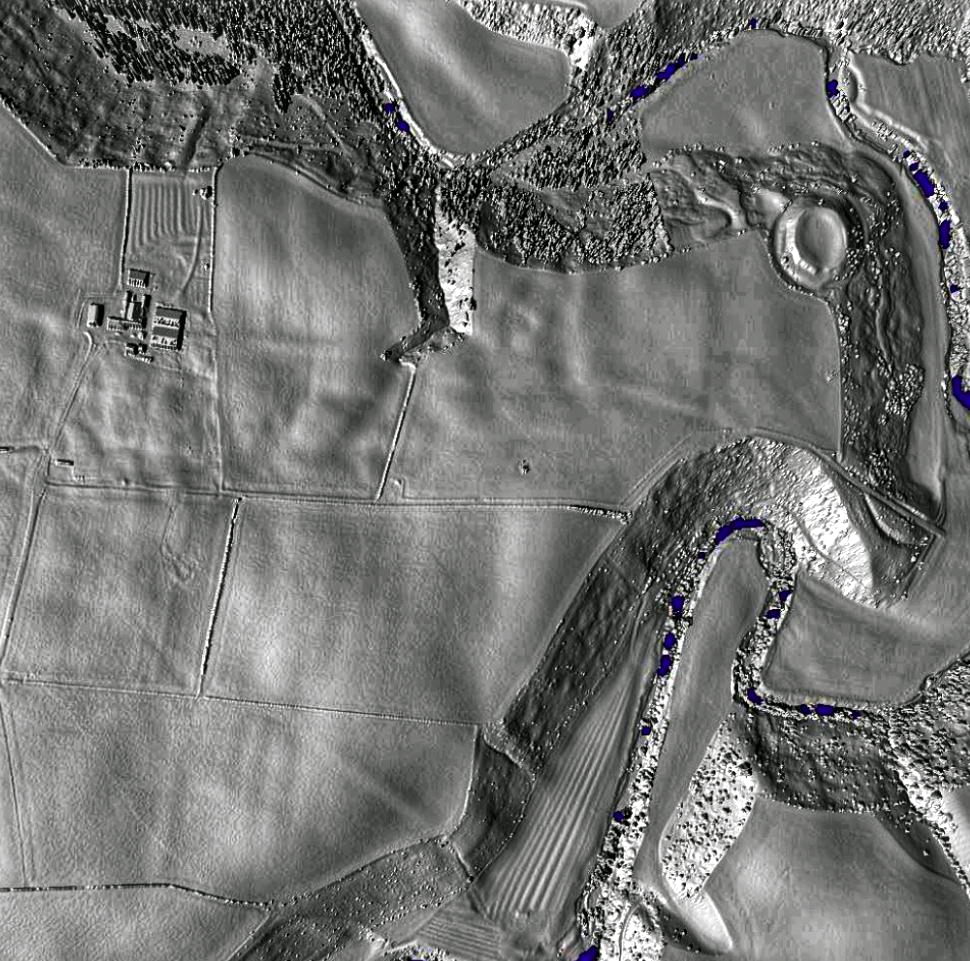
A lidar view of Castle Leavington Deserted Medieval Village

The parish covers a number of farms: Red Hall, White Hall, Spell Close, Levington House, Woodcroft and The Mill. Red Hall is a Grade II listed building. It was the seat of the Meryton family, whose most famous son was George Meryton (died 1624), chaplain to Queen Anne and Dean of Peterborough and York.

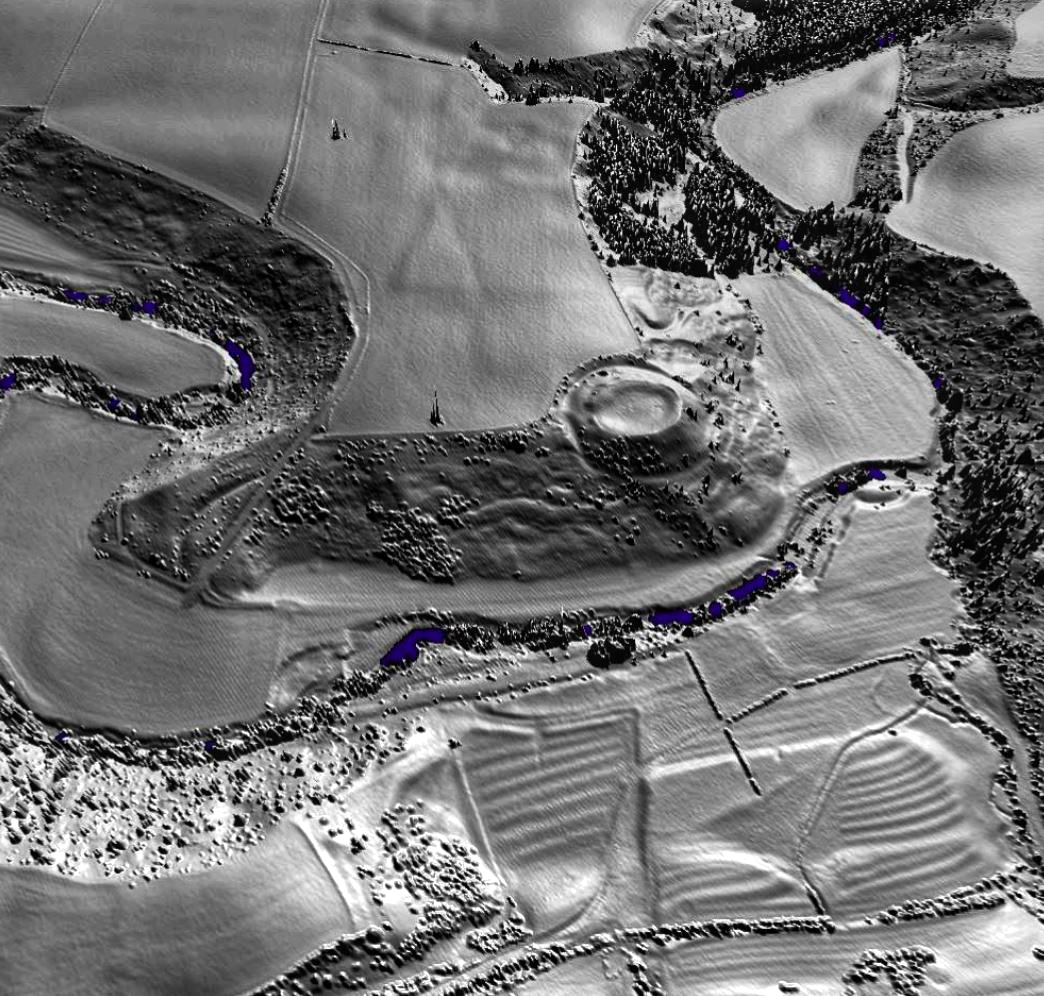
A lidar view of Castle Leavington (Castle Hill/Castle Leven) and Deserted Medieval Village

In the far east of the parish is the motte that gives the area its name. The eastern border is the River Leven.
