= Tom Brown (British Army soldier) =

British Army soldier (1705–1746)

Sir Thomas Brown
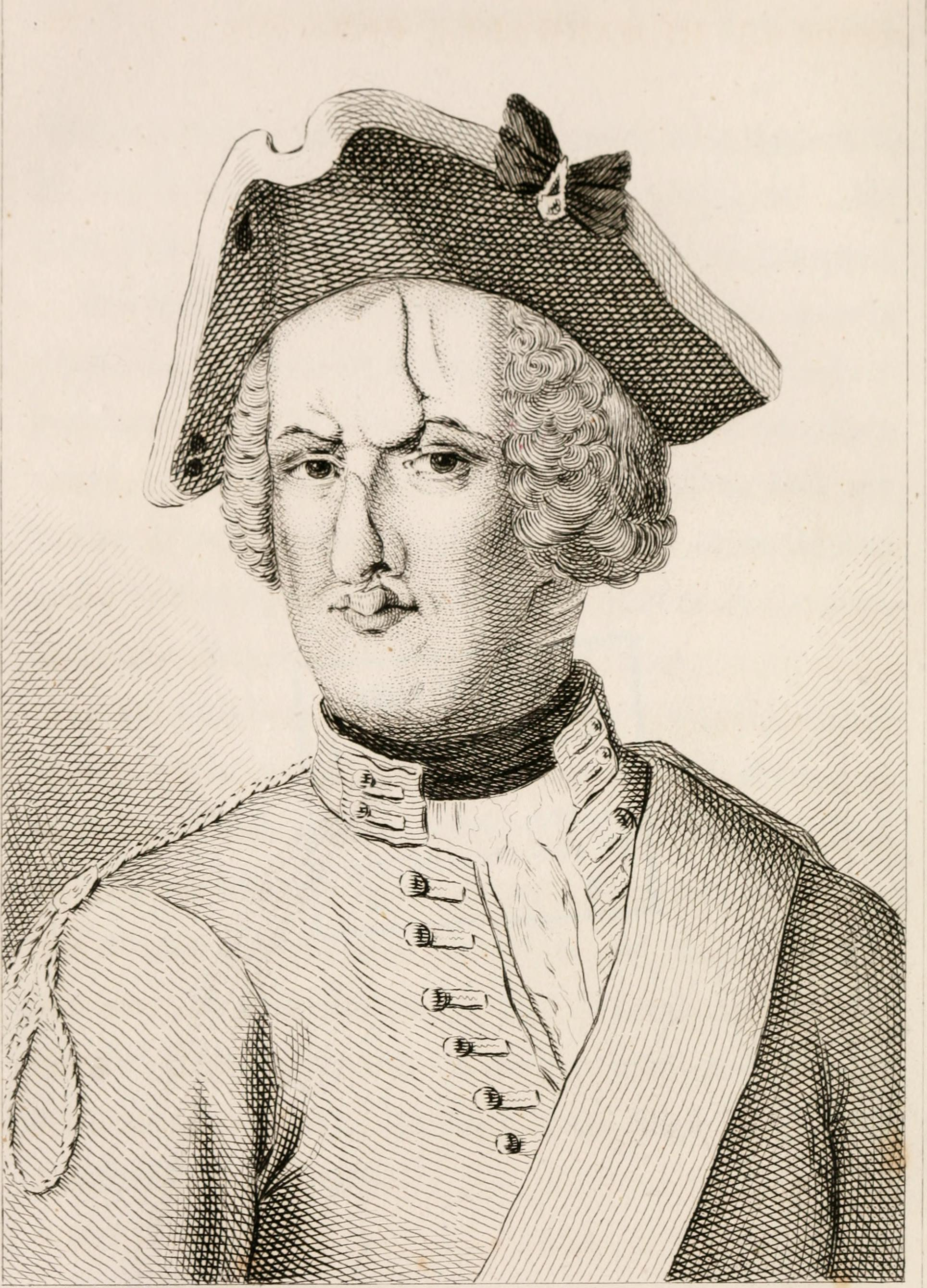
- Born: 1705; Kirkleatham, England
- Died: 1746 (aged 40–41); Yarm, UK
- Burial place: St Mary Magdalene's Church, Yarm
- Other name: Tom Brown
- Military career
- Allegiance: United Kingdom
- Branch: Army
- Rank: Private
- Units: King's Own Regiment Dragoons (Bland's Dragoons)
- Conflicts: Battle of Dettingen (1743)
- Other work: Inn keeper

Sir Thomas Brown (1705–1746) was born in Kirkleatham, in Yorkshire, in the north-east region of England. He was a hero of the Battle of Dettingen (27 June 1743), in Bavaria during the War of the Austrian Succession; the last time that a British monarch, in this case King George II, personally led his own country's troops into battle.

== Biography ==
Little is known of his early life, save for him being a shoemaker's apprentice in Yarm, before joining the Army.

Once enlisted, Brown fought as a private soldier in King's Own Regiment Dragoons (Bland's Dragoons). During this battle, he had two horses killed under him. In the thick of the action, Brown witnessed the regiment's standard falling to the ground and was captured by the French. Brown attempted to dismount his horse to recover the standard, but was struck by a blow from a sabre and lost two fingers from his left hand. His horse bolted in fright to the rear of the enemy lines, where Brown subsequently caught sight of his standard in the hands of a French trooper. Brown reclaimed the standard after killing the enemy soldier, remounted a horse, secured his regiments' standard by wedging its flagstaff between himself and the saddle, and returned to his own by galloping through the massed ranks of the enemy. During this return, Brown was further wounded by the French, receiving eight sabre cuts in his face, neck and head, and lost most of his nose as a result. Brown diced with death; two musket bullets hit his back, and three passed through his headgear. Returning to his own company a hero, he was applauded with 'three loud Huzzas' in recognition of his valiant bravery.

After his army service, Brown retired from the 3rd Hussars, whereupon he was rewarded by King George II with a gold-topped walking stick, a replica nose made of silver to replace his he lost in battle, and a King's pension of 30 crowns (£30) a year. Brown moved to Yarm and opened an inn bearing his own name, where he lived out the remainder of his life.

Brown died in Yarm in 1746 (aged 40–41) , and is buried there in the churchyard of St Mary Magdalene's Church (OS grid ref: NZ416129). His grave can still be seen and is now marked with a Portland stone replica of a Commonwealth War Graves Commission (CWGC) headstone, presented by the Queen's Own Hussars in 1968.

== Honours ==
The Battle of Dettingen is notable for two things: it was the last time a British monarch personally led his troops into battle, and the last time a serving soldier was knighted on the battlefield, until Australian Lieutenant General John Monash was knighted by King George V in 1918, following the Battle of Hamel. Tom Brown was knighted as a Knight Banneret by the King at the end of the battle for his actions, as noted in The London Magazine, and Monthly Chronologer as "the Trooper who retook the Standard from the French".

This is believed to be the last time a sovereign conferred the title Knight Bannerets to troops on the field of battle. It is recorded that the King created sixteen Knights Bannerets on the battlefield in a diary entry by Miss Gertrude Savile, which states "This honour had been laid aside since James I, when Baronets were instituted".

== Legacy ==
Brown's inn once contained an oil-painted sign which depicted him as the hero of the Battle of Dettingen. This sign is now lost, but a replica is located in Yarm Town Hall.
