= Conyers' School =

Location
- Green Lane; Yarm, Stockton-on-Tees, North Yorkshire, TS15 9ET; England
- Coordinates: 54.4962°N 1.3501°W

Information
- Type: Comprehensive; Academy
- Motto: Latin: Perseverando; Persevering
- Established: 1590; 436 years ago
- Founder: Thomas Conyers
- Department for Education URN: 139318 Tables
- Ofsted: Reports
- Headteacher: Chris Coleman
- Staff: 100+
- Gender: Coeducational
- Age: 11 to 18
- Enrolment: 1,385
- Colours: Navy Blue & Red
- Chair of Governors: Frances Johnson
- Head of Sixth Form: Paul Webster
- Website: http://www.conyers.org.uk

Conyers School is a coeducational secondary school and sixth form with academy status, in Yarm, Stockton-on-Tees, England.

== History ==
The Free Grammar School was founded in 1590 by Thomas Conyers of Egglescliffe, who was issued letters patent by Queen Elizabeth I to found a grammar school in the parish of Yarm. The original Free Grammar School of Thomas Conyers was in the grounds of Yarm Parish Church, but transferred to a site off The Spital in 1884. In 1977, the school moved to its present site on Green Lane when it became a comprehensive school. The fee-paying Yarm School was founded on the site at The Spital in the following year.

== Present day ==
The school catchment area covers the parish of Yarm and the surrounding villages including Kirklevington, as well as a proportion of Ingleby Barwick. Conyers has approximately 1500 pupils, including 1300 in the lower school and 200 in the sixth form, with pupils studying for GCSE and GCE A-level examinations. Students are also able to study certain NVQ and BTEC courses. The current headteacher is Chris Coleman Conyers School is one of a number of sixth form providers in the local area.

The school's previous Executive Head, John Morgan, was the President of the Association of School and College Leaders (ASCL) for the 2009-10 academic year. Whilst on this one year secondment, Louise Spellman became the school's Acting Head Teacher. In September 2010 the school remodelled its leadership. John Morgan returned from secondment to become Executive Headteacher. Louise Spellman took the role of Head of School.

On 21 June 2012 the school announced that John Morgan, Head Teacher since 1995, had died. The school set up a condolence page on its web site.

In April 2012, the school began a consultation on the possibility of an academy conversion. The consultation found that there was an overall majority for supporting academy status. The school converted into an academy on 1 February 2013.

== Academic performance and inspections ==
As of 2026, the school's most recent Ofsted inspection was a Section 8 (ungraded) inspection in 2023, with a judgement that the school remains Good.

GCSE	2018	2019	2020	2023	2024	2025
5+ 9-4 inc. Eng/Maths	76.7%	79%	87%			
5+ 9-4	74%	74%	83.2%	82.3%	75.9%	76.2%
5+ 9-1	99.1%	99.5%	100%	99.7%	99.2%	98.8%

A-Levels	2018	2019	2020	2024
% A – E	95.5	92.7	99.7	99
% A – B	43	64.5	58	58
