= Levendale =

Housing estate in North Yorkshire, England

Coordinates: 54.503°N 1.333°W

Levendale is a small housing estate in the south-east of Yarm, in North Yorkshire, England, which is bordered by the River Leven. It is also known as Ingleby Grange. The estate is built in former area occupied by Leven Mouth Farm.

Levendale has been, and is the home to many of Middlesbrough F.C.'s footballers.

Other than houses, Levendale has one Primary School, and an independent convenience store as well as various large open spaces including one that runs down the middle of the estate where electricity pylons used to stand until they were removed in the summer of 2004. Half of the estate's streets follow a naming theme of villages in the North York Moors.

A map of Levendale showing roads

== School ==
Levendale Primary School is a primary school located in the estate which opened in the 1970s.

The school is located at the centre of the estate and consists of five buildings.
