= St Mary Magdalene, Yarm =

Church of England parish church in Yarm, North Yorkshire, England

Yarm Parish Church
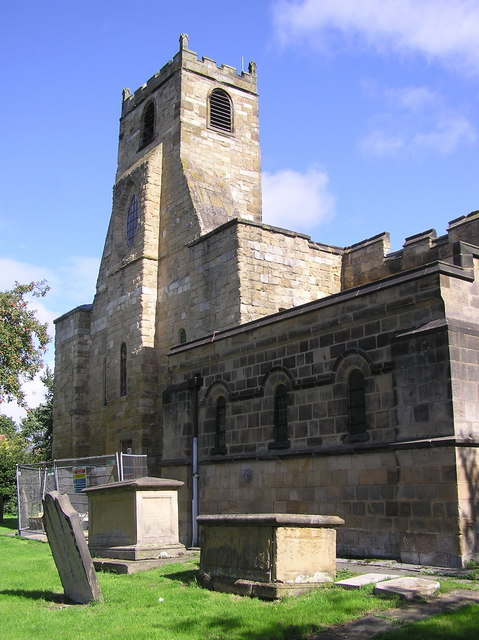

- The church in North Yorkshire, England
- 54.510°N 1.358°W
- OS grid reference: NZ 41633 12914
- Denomination: Church of England
- Churchmanship: Broad Church/Liberal Catholic
- Website: yarmchurch.org.uk

History
- Dedication: St Mary Magdalene

Architecture
- Functional status: Active
- Heritage designation: Grade II*

Administration
- Province: York
- Diocese: York
- Archdeaconry: Cleveland
- Deanery: Stokesley
- Parish: Yarm

Clergy
- Rector: Revd Darren Moore

St Mary Magdalene is a Church of England parish church in the town of Yarm, in the Borough of Stockton-on-Tees, North Yorkshire, England, which is dedicated to Jesus' companion Mary Magdalene. Administratively, it is a parish of the Diocese of York. The current rector is the Reverend Darren Moore.

The current church building is the third to stand on the site. The first was a wooden Anglo-Saxon building of which no traces remain. A Norman church was built in the late 12th century and remained until 1728 when it razed by fire. The present Georgian church was built from the remains of the second in 1730.

== History ==
=== Anglo-Saxon church ===
The earliest evidence of a church being present in the town is the Trumbert Shaft. The shaft part of an inscribed sandstone grave cross. It was discovered being used as a mangle weight in Yarm in 1877 by Canon Greenwell of Durham. The shaft is now kept in the library of Durham Cathedral and bears the inscription:

+ [orate] PRO [tru]MBERENCT + SAC+ ALLA +
SIGNUM AEFTER HIS BREODERA YSETAE

Which translates as:

Pray for Trumberhet, Bishop
Alla set up this memorial to his brother

Trumbert or Trumberhet was consecrated as Bishop of Hexham in AD 681, he was succeeded in AD 684 by Eata. The date of his death is not known, but clearly he was buried at Yarm late in the 7th or early in the 8th century.

=== Norman church ===
The west end and the base of the tower of the present building are part of the original stone church was built by the de Brus family in the latter half of the 12th century. A fortified tower was added in the 13th century and rebuilt during the 17th century.

=== Georgian Church ===
In 1728 the Norman church was badly damaged by fire that and had to be rebuilt. The cost of the damage was put at £1,772 and was raised by public subscription. King George II allowed collections to be made at churches throughout England to help finance the rebuilding, something that proved so successful that the rebuilding was completed by 1730 using much of the stone from the earlier building.

In 1878 the church was enlarged and restored by the Paley and Austin partnership of Lancaster.

The stonework of the Georgian part of the building has lost its weather resisting properties as a result of age and air pollution.

=== Present day ===
On 23 June 1966, the church was designated a grade II* listed building. The churchyard is closed to new burials, but there is an area for the interment of cremations.

The church is within the broad church and liberal catholic traditions of the Church of England. It is a member of Inclusive Church.

== Interior ==
=== Lady Chapel ===
The Lady Chapel was refurbished in memory of Leslie Leech. It was dedicated in 2003 by the Archbishop of York, David Hope.

=== Stained Glass ===
The windows in the South aisle have subjects taken from the Old Testament. From east to west:

- God's testing of Abraham
- Moses receiving the Ten Commandments
- Prophet Elijah calling down fire from Heaven

The large Moses window is the oldest and best of the glass in the church. It was executed by William Peckitt of York in 1768 and was originally in the Chancel, but was moved to it present position in 1879. The windows in the North aisle and East End of the Church are on New Testament themes. From west to east:

- Christ's Baptism
- The Crucifixion
- Christ the Lover of children and Christ the Good Shepherd
- The Resurrection
- The Last Supper
- The Ascension.

In the West End of the nave are two small round windows. One has a dove symbolising the Holy Spirit and the other a Lamb carrying a flag symbolising Jesus Christ. The Vestry has a 20th-century window depicting the three Marys meeting the angel at the Tomb on the first Easter Day.

=== Decorations ===
Above the door to the vestry was an oil painting depicting the Holy Family with the young John the Baptist by an unnamed artist of the 19th century in the style of the 16th-century Italian school. This painting was disposed of in 2015 and has been replaced by a lightbox with a modern stained glass interpretation of Christ busting from the tomb. On the left of the Ascension window is an old terracotta copy of a Della Robia plaque depicting the Virgin and Child that was found in the ruins of a French cathedral during the First World War by the writer E. V. Lucas. Similar plaques are found in the cloisters of Tuscan monasteries. It dates from around 1800. Around the walls can be found framed prints of the Stations of the Cross and on the pillars are small shields bearing ecclesiastical signs and symbols. In the Sanctuary is a Tudor bishop's mitre. Until 1865 the Rector of Yarm was the Archbishop, and the mitre represented his presence as vicar of the parish.

=== Furnishings ===
The present pews, pulpit, clerk's desk and choir stalls date from 1878 and are in the Renaissance style. The High Altar was made out of pews removed from the South aisle in 1940. The Altar rails are the work of the noted Yorkshire craftsman Robert Thompson – the Mouseman of Kilburn – and were given in 1948 in memory of Mary Clapham and her son John Geoffrey who was killed in the Second World War. The dedication and the identifying mouse, is carved on the Sanctuary side of the rails. The Font is an octagonal bowl of Tees marble with incurved sides on each of which is a blank shield. It is thought to have been fashioned in the 15th century.

=== Organ ===
When the church was rebuilt in 1730 the organ was on a gallery at the West End of the church as is still the case in many churches. In Yarm the organ gallery was removed in 1852 and the organ was moved to the east end of the north aisle. In 1910 the present organ was purchased from Thomas Hopkins and Son of York. The organ has a total of 1134 pipes in 27 stops.

A specification of the organ can be found on the National Pipe Organ Register.

=== The True Lovers ===
Alongside the West wall set into the floor is the cover of a table tomb, dating from the 15th century. It is carved with supine male and female figures, a figure of a bird (an eagle or falcon) and a seated figure with one hand raised in benediction. There is an inscription that appears to read here lyeth the body and was buried the 2nd of July An. Do. 1638, suggesting that the tomb has been reused. The original occupants of the tomb must have been significant persons at least locally, but who they were remains a mystery. In the absence of identification for them they became known as The True Lovers, and the nearby riverside path became known as True Lovers' Walk.

=== Bells ===
There is a ring of 3 bells. The oldest is dated 1664 weighs 23 stone 9 pounds (150 kg) and is inscribed Fili Dei Misere Mei. The next oldest is dated 1710, weighs 27 stone 8 pounds (175 kg) and is inscribed Sono Quantum Valeo. The smallest bell weighs 19 stone 10 pounds (125 kg), and was recast in 1861 because it had cracked. It bears the names of the churchwardens in that year – James Todd and Wheatley Coates.

== Churchyard ==
In the Churchyard a modern headstone commemorates Tom Brown, "The Valiant Dragoon" hero of the Battle of Dettingen He died in 1746 and was buried in an unmarked grave. A short distance away is a stone marking the original site of the Free Grammar School of Thomas Conyers founded in 1590.

== See also ==
- List of ecclesiastical works by Paley and Austin
