= Yarm Town Hall =

Municipal building in Yarm, North Yorkshire, England

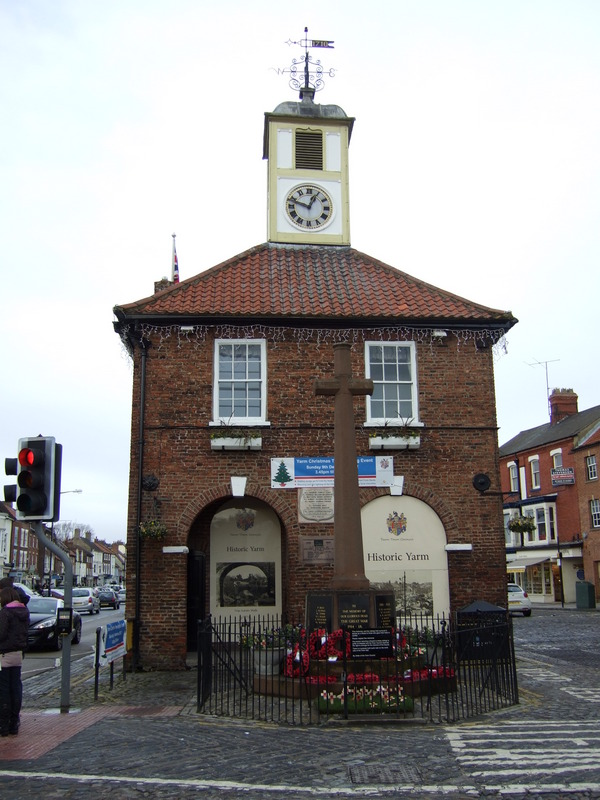
- Yarm Town Hall

- Shown in North Yorkshire
- 54.5092°N 1.3543°W
- Location: High Street, Yarm

History
- Built: 1710

Site notes
- Architectural style: Dutch style

Listed Building – Grade II
- Official name: Town Hall
- Designated: 5 May 1952
- Reference no.: 1329488

Yarm Town Hall is a municipal building in the High Street in Yarm, North Yorkshire, England. The structure, which is the meeting place of Yarm Town Council, is a Grade II listed building.

== History ==
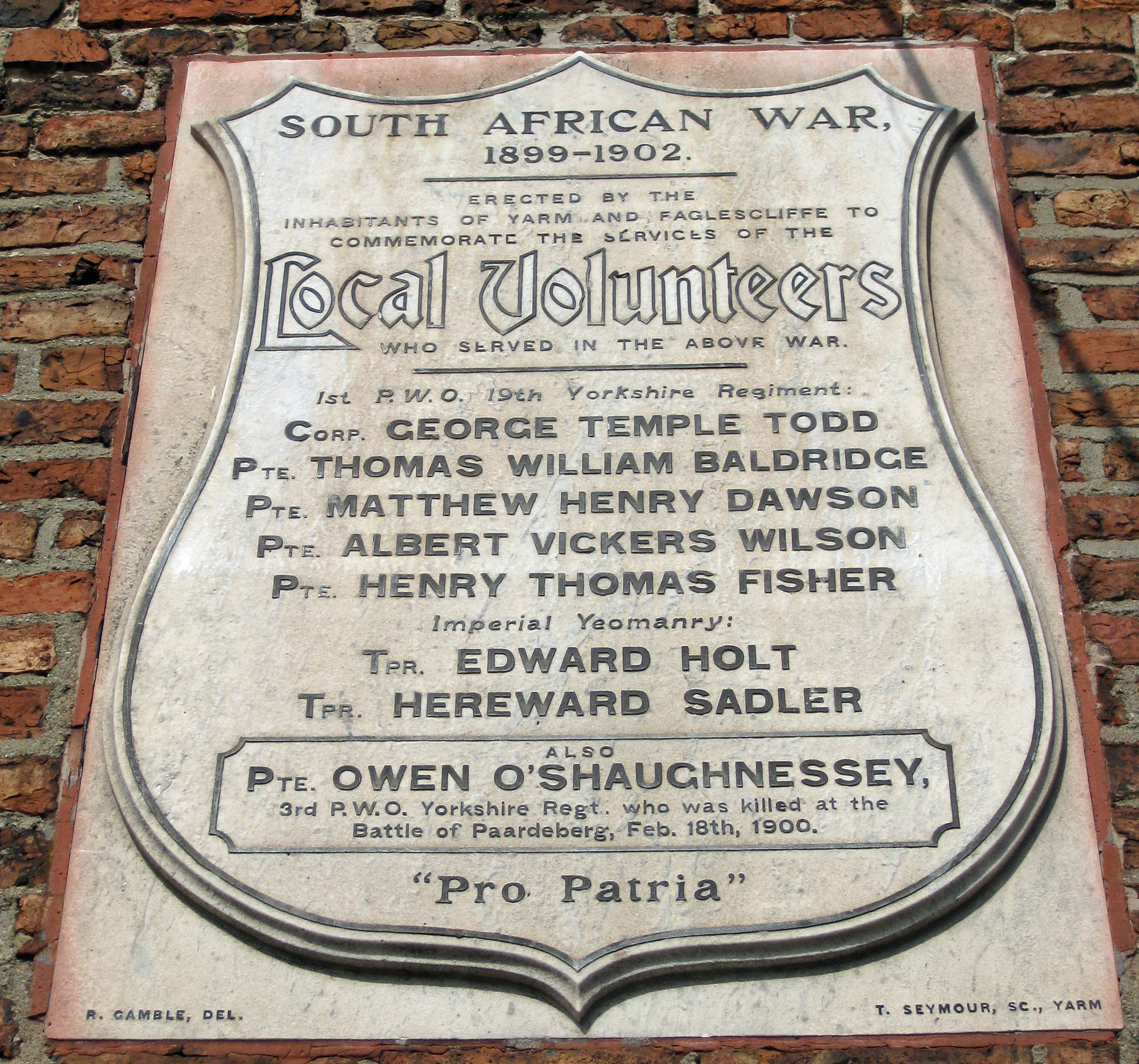
The Second Boer War Memorial

The first building on the site was a medieval tollbooth erected to enable the lord of the manor collect tolls from people on the north-south coaching route between London and Edinburgh. The town was an important coaching stop located just south of the bridge across the River Tees. A bell to be rung in case of flooding or fire was installed in the belfry in 1690: it was inscribed: "Si Deus pro nobis ouis contra nos." (English: If God is for us, who can be against us?) When the old tollbooth became dilapidated, the then lord of the manor, Thomas Belasyse, 3rd Viscount Fauconberg, decided to demolish it and to replace it with a new structure.

The new building was designed in the Dutch style, built in red brick and completed in 1710. The building was arcaded on the ground floor, so that markets could be held, with a room for the administration of tolls on the first floor. The design involved a symmetrical main frontage with two bays facing south along the High Street; there were sash windows on the first floor and it featured a pyramid-shaped roof with a square clock tower, a belfry and a weather vane. The bell for the new building had been recovered from the old tollbooth.

The new building continued to operate as a tollbooth, especially after the Catterick Bridge to Durham turnpike road opened in 1747, and was still referred to as a tollbooth in the early 19th century. The building also served as the venue for court hearings held by the lord of the manor and, later, by the local magistrates. It appeared, by 1824, to have a "ruinous and unseemly appearance" but, after repairs were carried out in the mid-19th century, it was described as "a neat building".

After a heavy flood on 17 September 1771, a plaque was installed in the building to record the level of the flood and a second plaque, recording a less severe flood on 10 March 1881, was installed on the south elevation of the building following that event. Some of the arches were bricked up in 1888 to accommodate a set of imperial measures, typically held by local authorities to ensure tradesmen comply with the Weights and Measures Act 1824.

A plaque to commemorate the lives of service personnel who had served with the Prince of Wales's Own Regiment of Yorkshire and with the Imperial Yeomanry in the Second Boer War was installed on the south face of the building in the early 20th century and a memorial to commemorate the lives of service personnel who had died in the First World War was unveiled in front of the building by the Lord Lieutenant of the North Riding of Yorkshire, Sir Hugh Bell, on 12 June 1920. Another plaque to commemorate the lives of local people who had served on the local committee of the Stockton and Darlington Railway was installed on the face of the building to mark the centenary of the railway in 1925.

The remaining open arches were bricked up when it was decided that the building should accommodate public toilets in the 1930s. For administrative purposes the town developed as a civil parish, and, after it was designated an ecclesiastical parish in 1865, the parish council, which became known as Yarm Town Council, continued to use the building as its regular meeting place.
