= Yarm =

Town and civil parish in North Yorkshire, England

Coordinates: 54.5°N 1.35°W

Yarm-on-Tees: Yarm
- Market town and civil parish
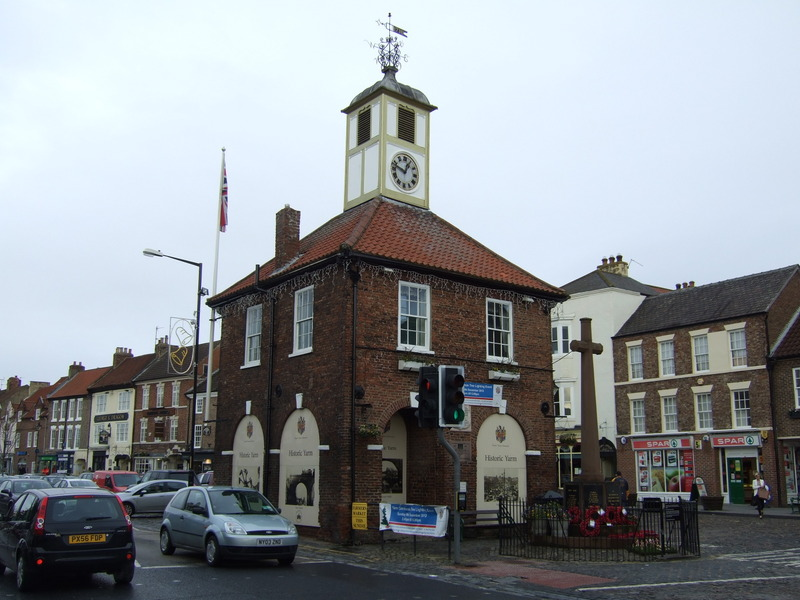
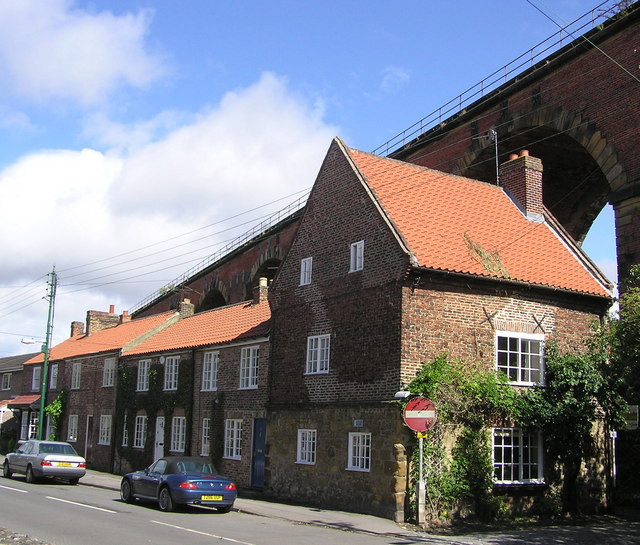
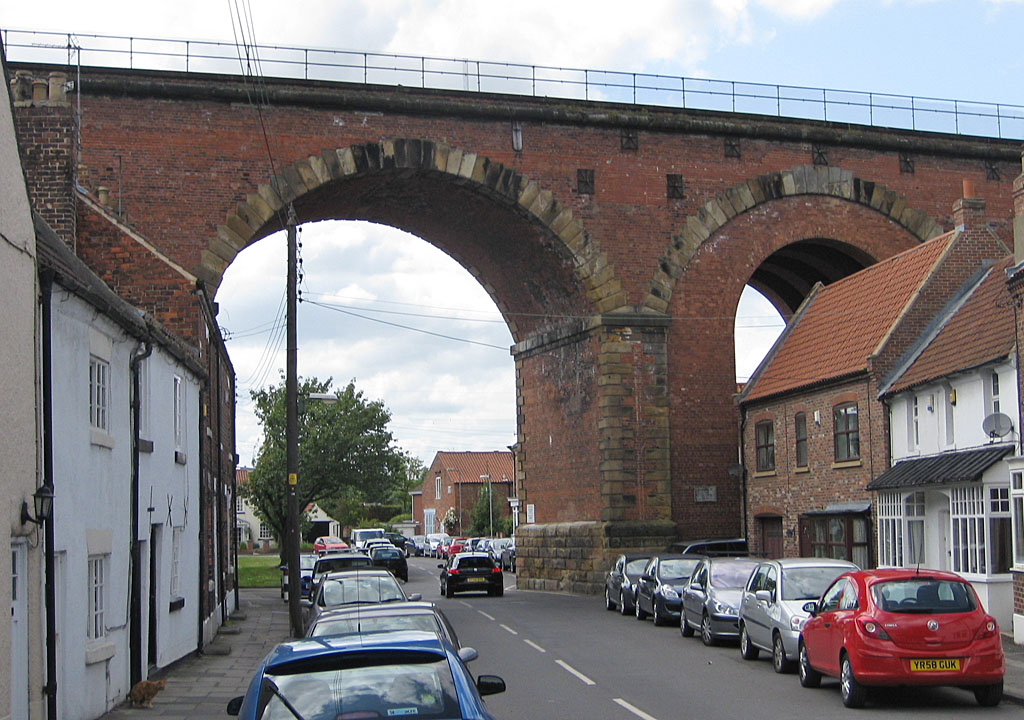
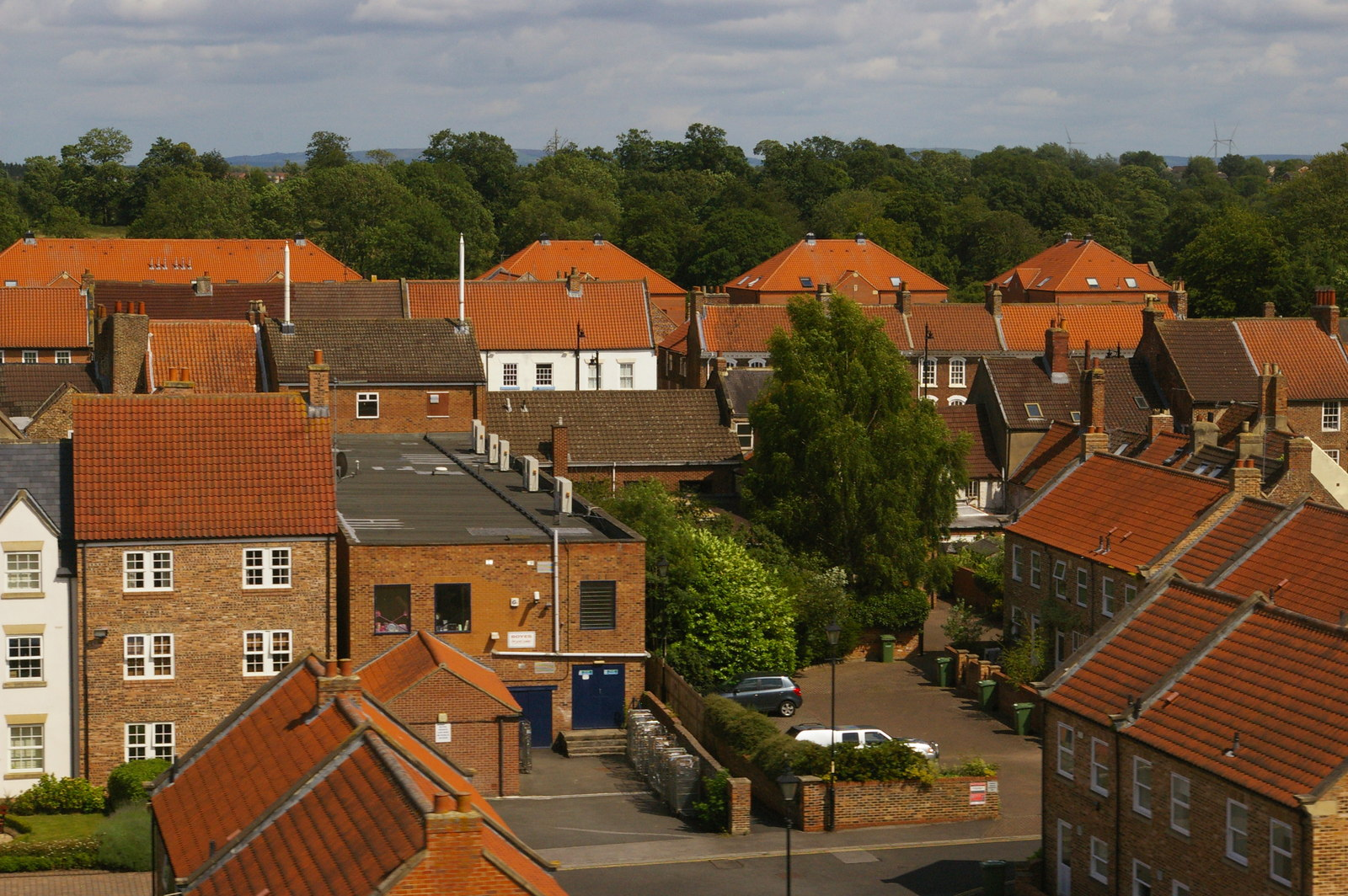
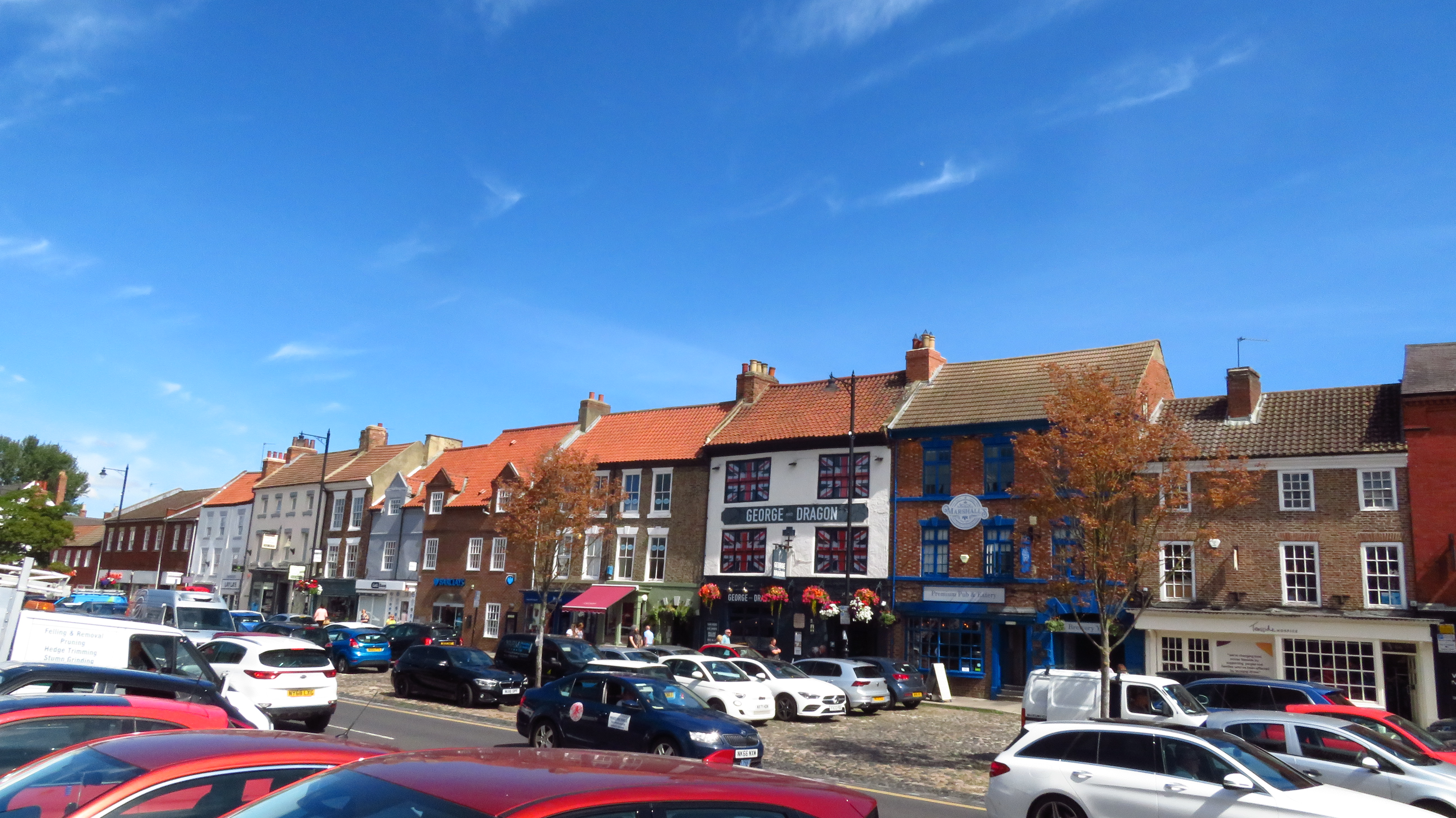
- Yarm Town Hall Hope House, believed to be the oldest building in Yarm Yarm Viaduct spanning the town Residential houses around the old market area Yarm High Street

- Location within North Yorkshire
- Population: 9,600 (2021 census)
- OS grid reference: NZ416124
- Civil parish: Yarm
- Unitary authority: Stockton-on-Tees
- Ceremonial county: North Yorkshire
- Region: North East
- Country: England
- Sovereign state: United Kingdom
- Post town: YARM
- Postcode district: TS15
- Dialling code: 01642
- Police: Cleveland
- Fire: Cleveland
- Ambulance: North East
- UK Parliament: Stockton West
- Website: www.YarmTC.org

Yarm-on-Tees, or simply Yarm, is a market town and civil parish in the Borough of Stockton-on-Tees in North Yorkshire, England. It lies on a meander of the River Tees, extending south-east to the River Leven and south to the village of Kirklevington. Yarm is near the towns of Stockton-on-Tees, 5 miles (8.0 km) to its northeast, and Darlington, 11 miles (18 km) to its west.

Yarm is known for its high street, voted Britain's best in a 2007 BBC Breakfast poll, and the Yarm Viaduct which spans across the town. It is also known locally for its annual funfair.

== History ==
The name Yarm is thought to be derived from the Old English gearum, dative plural of gear, 'pool for catching fish' (source of the modern dialect word yair with the same meaning), hence 'at the place of the fish pools'. Yarm was first mentioned in the Domesday Book of 1086, and was originally a chapelry in the Kirklevington parish in the North Riding of Yorkshire; it later became a parish in its own right.

The Yarm helmet is a c. 10th-century Viking Age helmet that was found in Yarm. It is the first relatively complete Anglo-Scandinavian helmet found in Britain and only the second Viking helmet discovered in north-west Europe. It is displayed nearby in Preston Park Museum, Preston-on-Tees.

Dominican Friars settled in Yarm about 1286, and maintained a friary and a hospital in the town, until 1583. Their memory is preserved in the names of Friarage and Spital Bank. The Friarage was built on top of the cellars of a Dominican friary in 1770, for the Meynell family. It is now at the centre of Yarm School.

Bishop Skirlaw of Durham built a stone bridge, which still stands, across the Tees in 1400. An iron replacement was built in 1805, but it fell down in 1806. For many years, Yarm was at the tidal limit and head of navigation on the River Tees.

On 1 February 1643, during the First English Civil War, a small Roundhead force attempted to halt the progress of a large waggon-train of arms, landed at Tynemouth and destined to bolster the Royalist war effort in Yorkshire and beyond. Heavily outnumbered and outflanked by Royalist ford crossings, the Parliamentarians were quickly routed and the Royalists gained the bridge, crossing into Yorkshire.

On 12 February 1821, at the George & Dragon Inn, the meeting was held that pressed for the third and successful attempt for a Bill to give permission to build the Stockton & Darlington Railway, the world's first public railway.

In 1890, Bulmer & Co listed twelve inns in Yarm: Black Bull, Cross Keys, Crown Inn, Fleece, George and Dragon, Green Tree, Ketton Ox, Lord Nelson, Red Lion, Three Tuns, Tom Brown, and Union. Also listed was Cross Keys beside the Leven Bridge.

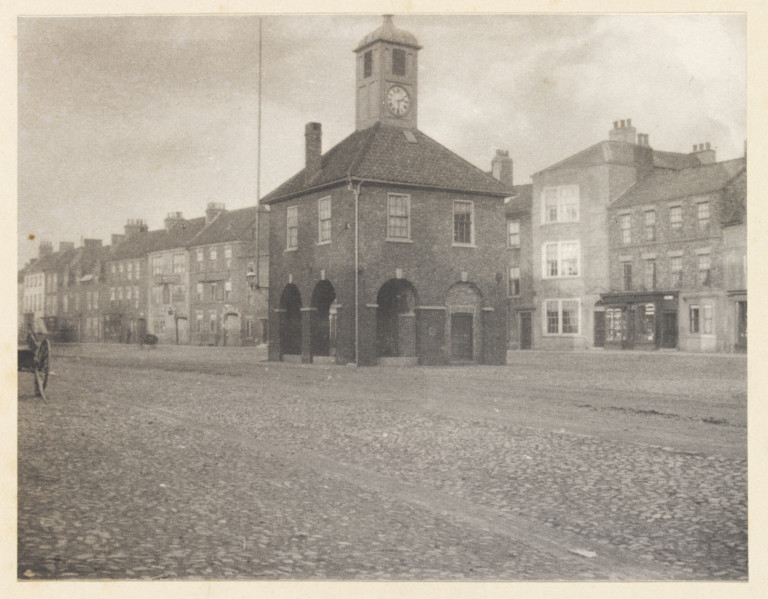
Yarm in 1902

In the 13th century, Yarm was classed as a borough, but this status did not persist. It formed part of the Stokesley Rural District under the Local Government Act 1894, and remained so until 1 April 1974 when, under the Local Government Act 1972, it became part of the district of Stockton-on-Tees in the new non-metropolitan county of Cleveland. Cleveland was abolished in 1996 under the Banham Review, with Stockton-on-Tees becoming a unitary authority.

In January 2025, the Town Hall clock-winder, 76-year-old Graham Tebbs, retired after 32 years of manual clock-winding. The clock mechanism was now wound electrically.

== Geography ==
A map of Yarm showing main roads and estates

Yarm is bordered by two rivers, the River Tees to the north, and the River Leven to the east. The Leven is a tributary of the Tees. Yarm was once the highest port on the Tees.

Two road bridges cross the river, Yarm Bridge crossing from the High Street to Eaglescliffe, which is Grade II* listed, and Leven Bridge crossing the Leven between Yarm and Low Leven, which is Grade II listed. On 26 February 2010, Leven Bridge was closed after cracks appeared in it. Repairs took less time than expected, and the bridge re-opened on 18 June 2010.

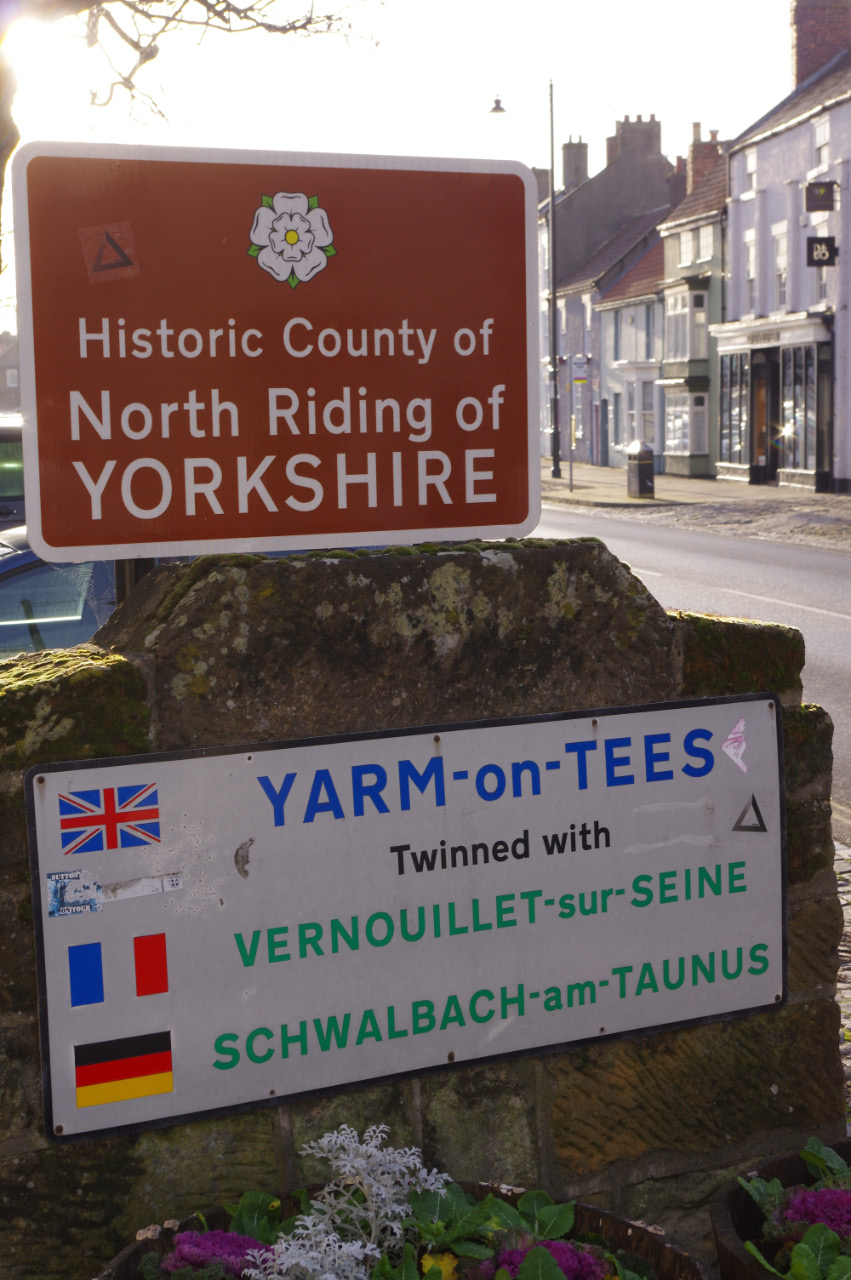
Signs marking the entrance to Yarm and the crossing of the historic border of the North Riding of Yorkshire from County Durham.

Yarm Town Hall in the High Street was built in 1710 by Thomas Belasyse, 3rd Viscount Fauconberg who was Lord of the manor. In a poll taken for the BBC's Breakfast programme on 19 January 2007, Yarm's High Street was voted the 'Best High Street': the street and its cobbled parking areas is fronted by many Georgian-style old buildings, with their red pantile roofs.

The A67, which runs through High Street was previously classified as the A19 until a dual carriageway was built in the 1970s, about three miles (five kilometres) south of the town near the village of Crathorne. When the A19 ran through High Street, it was heavily congested. The road was used by heavy goods traffic as a shortcut to Teesside International Airport. The classification of the road as an 'A'-road meant that it was difficult to place a ban on heavy goods vehicles; however the town council made efforts to come up with voluntary agreements with many haulage firms until 2012, when all HGV traffic was banned from the route through Yarm and Eaglescliffe.

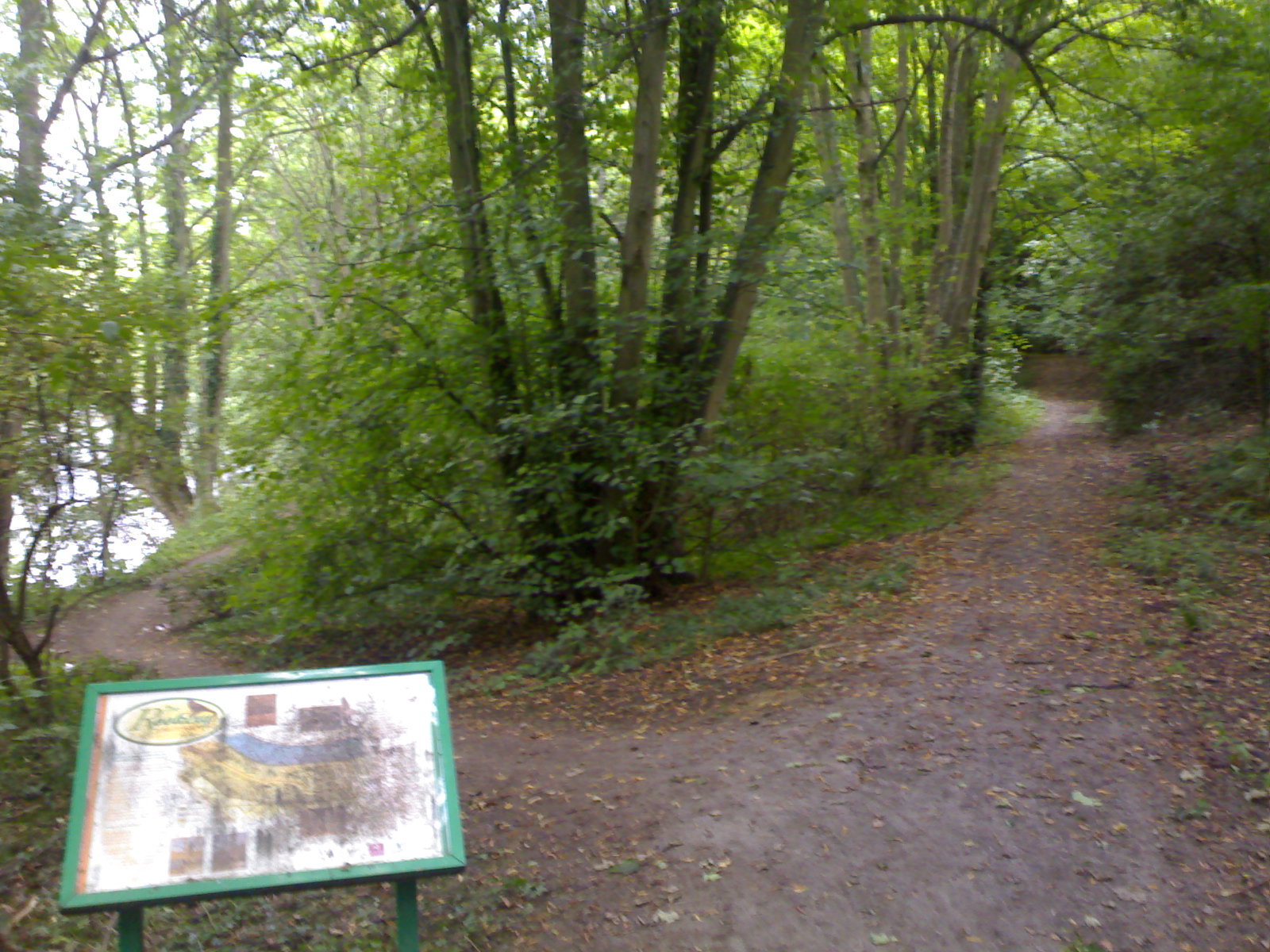
The Rookery

The Rookery is a public area by the River Tees situated at the bottom of Goose Pasture. The ash, sycamore and lime woodland is about 200 years old and owned by Yarm Town Council. In 2002, a walkway was constructed around the wood to celebrate the Golden Jubilee of Queen Elizabeth II. Within the woodland, close to the river, BMX riders have created numerous dirt ramps which are regularly used during summer months.

Areas of Yarm include the housing estates Levendale in the southeast and Leven Park in the south.

== Demographics ==
In 1801, Yarm had 1,300 inhabitants.

== Governance ==
=== House of Commons ===
Yarm is part of the Stockton West constituency currently represented in the House of Commons by Matt Vickers of the Conservative Party. From 1997 to 2010, the constituency was represented by Dari Taylor of the Labour Party. In 2010, the seat was won by Conservative James Wharton who held the seat until he was defeated by Labour's Paul Williams in 2017, who in turn was defeated by Vickers in 2019.

=== Stockton-on-Tees Borough Council ===
The Yarm ward, including Kirklevington, is currently represented by three Conservative Party councillors on Stockton Borough Council.

=== Yarm Town Council ===
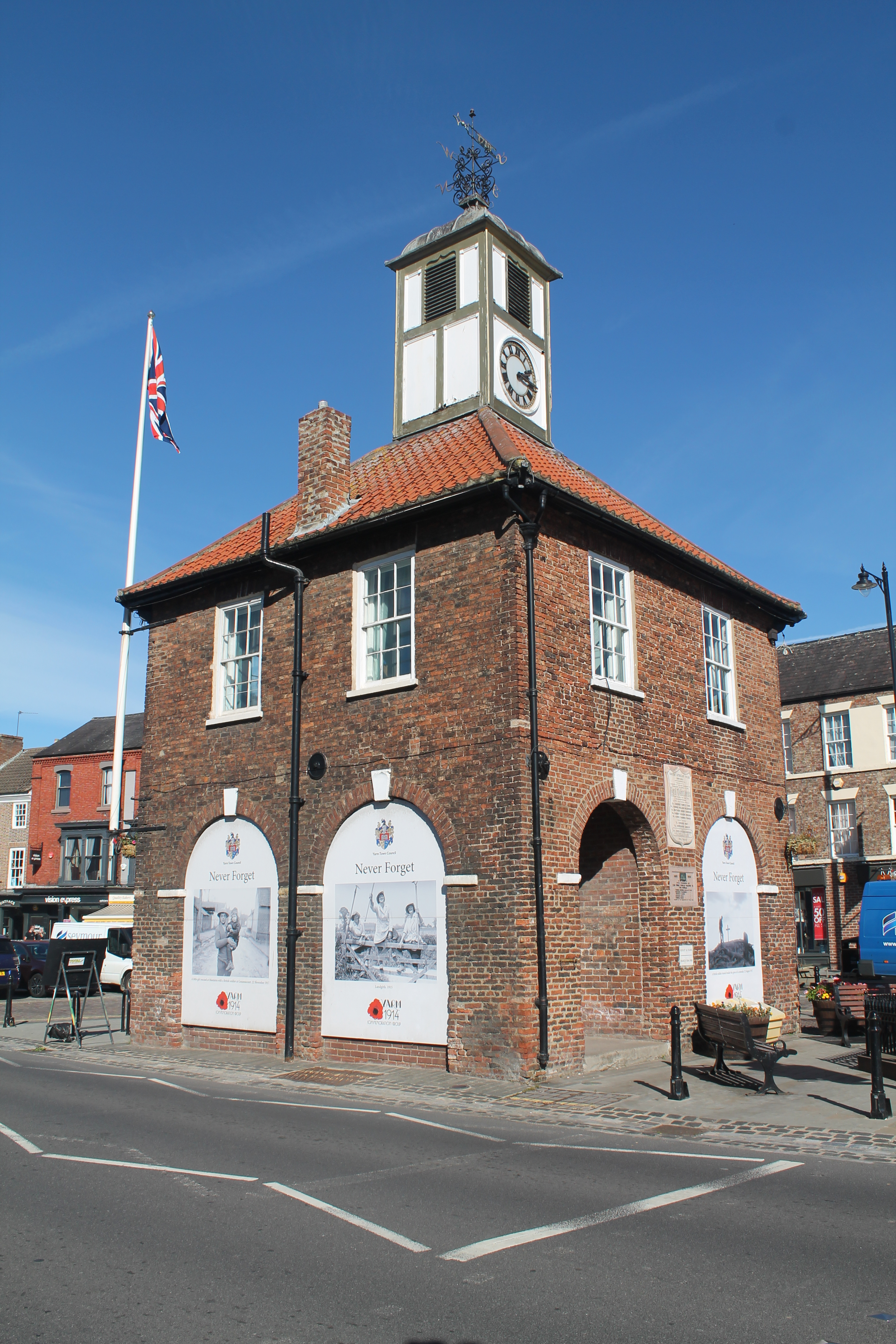
Yarm Town Hall, where Yarm Town Council meets

Yarm has a town council which is responsible for certain aspects of the town's administration, including allotments and the cemetery. It meets once a month at the town hall.

The council has eleven seats with a chairman who, for ceremonial purposes, is 'Mayor'. The Standing Orders of the Council restrict the chairman's period of office to two years in any four-year period. The 2015 chairman was Cllr Jason Hadlow. Elections for the council are held every four years.

During June 2025 all of the councillors resigned, with reports of fractious interactions in meetings and online.

== Transport ==
=== Railway ===
The Yarm railway station, opened in 1996, is located on Green Lane near Conyers' School, about one mile (1.5 kilometres) south of Yarm High Street. Yarm is also serviced by the Eaglescliffe railway station.

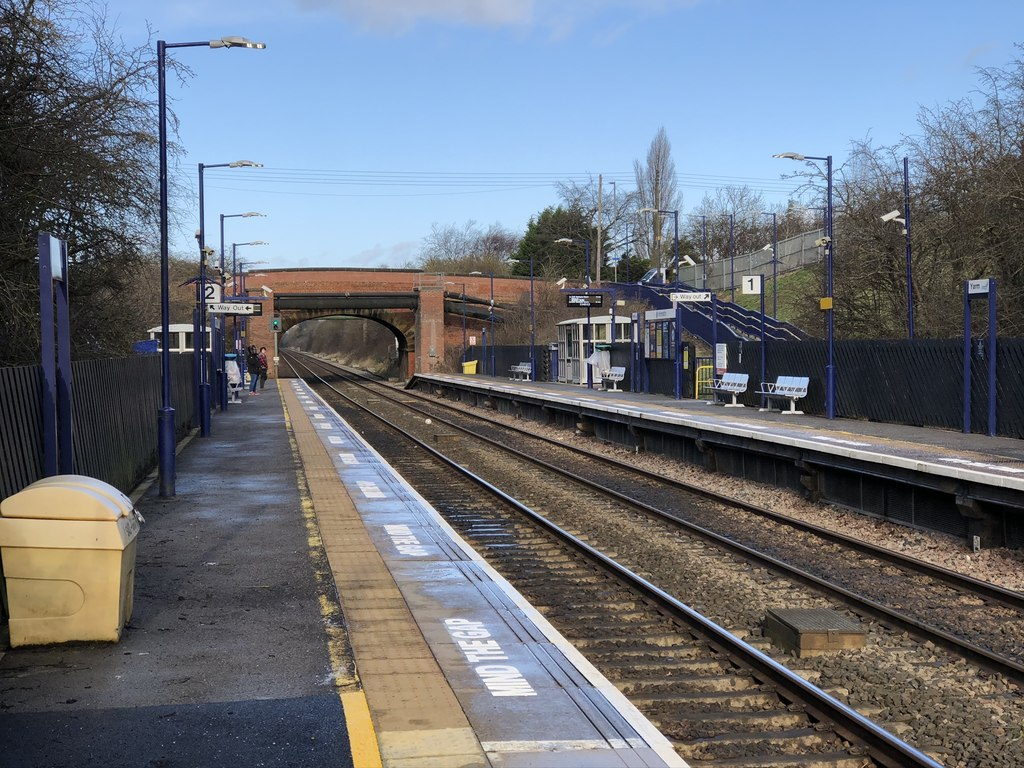
Yarm railway station in neighbouring Kirklevington

The 2,280-foot-long (690 m) railway viaduct, spanning across the town, was built between 1849 and 1851 for the Leeds Northern Railway Company. Designed by Thomas Grainger and John Bourne, it comprises seven million bricks and 43 arches, with the two that span the River Tees being skewed stone.

=== Air ===
Teesside International Airport, located between Yarm and Darlington, offers domestic and international flights.

=== Road ===
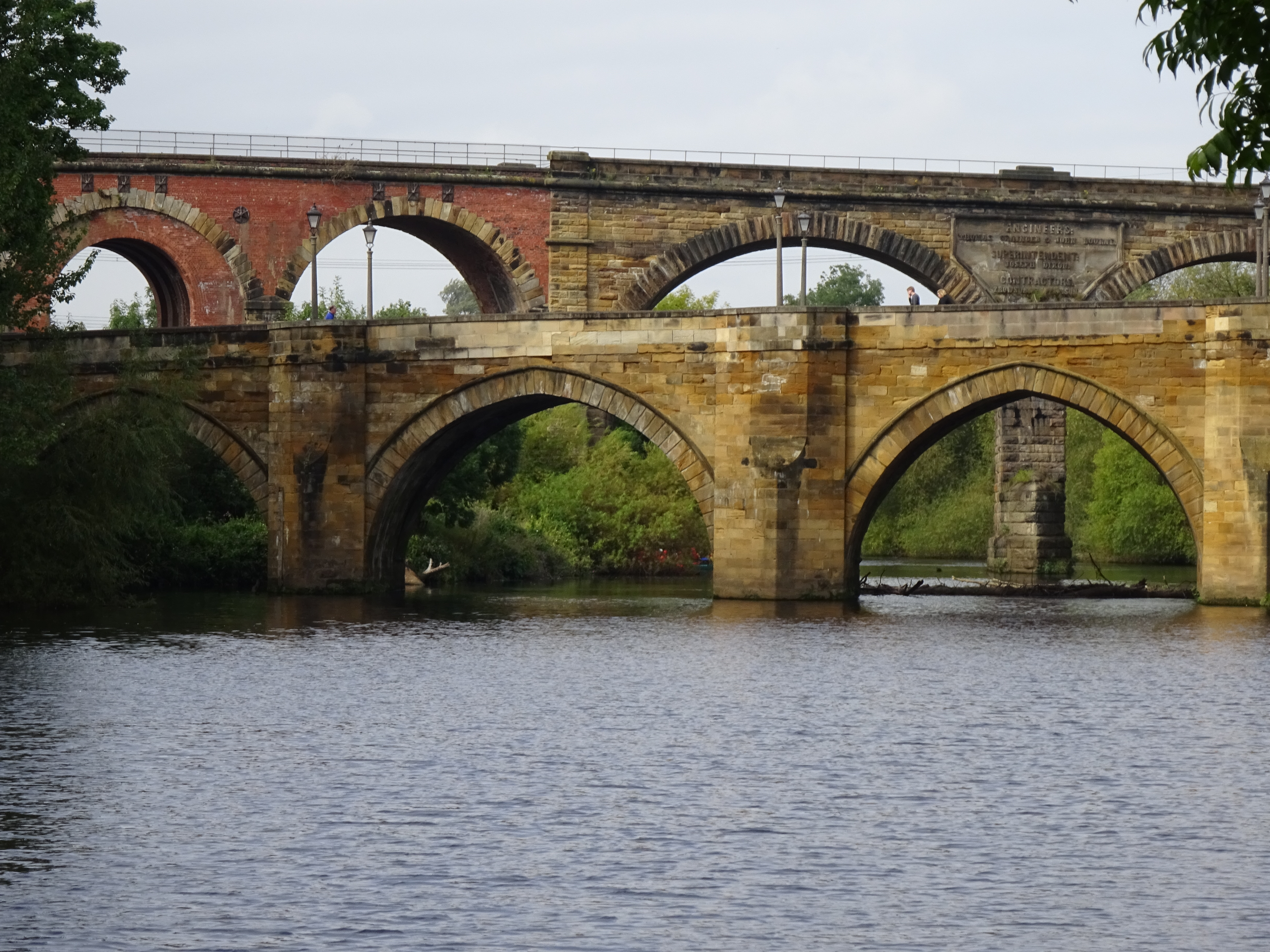
The Viaduct for rail (higher) and Yarm road-and-foot bridge (lower), both crossing over the Tees

The high street of Yarm is currently numbered as the A67 (formerly A19). North of Yarm High Street leads to a fork just outside the high street with the A135 Yarm Road heading north-east, to Stockton-on-Tees, and A67/Durham Road going north-west, the A67 goes to the airport and Darlington. Durham Road goes to the A19, this name separation is through a roundabout in Eaglescliffe.

The south of the high street links to the current A19. It also forks west as B1265 Green Lane leading to the A167 and Northallerton. The roundabout A1044 Low Lane and heads east to the Blue Bell roundabout in Middlesbrough and west towards Richmond.

== Religion ==
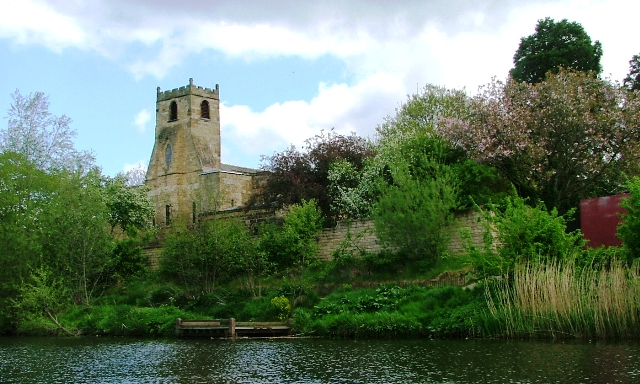
The parish church

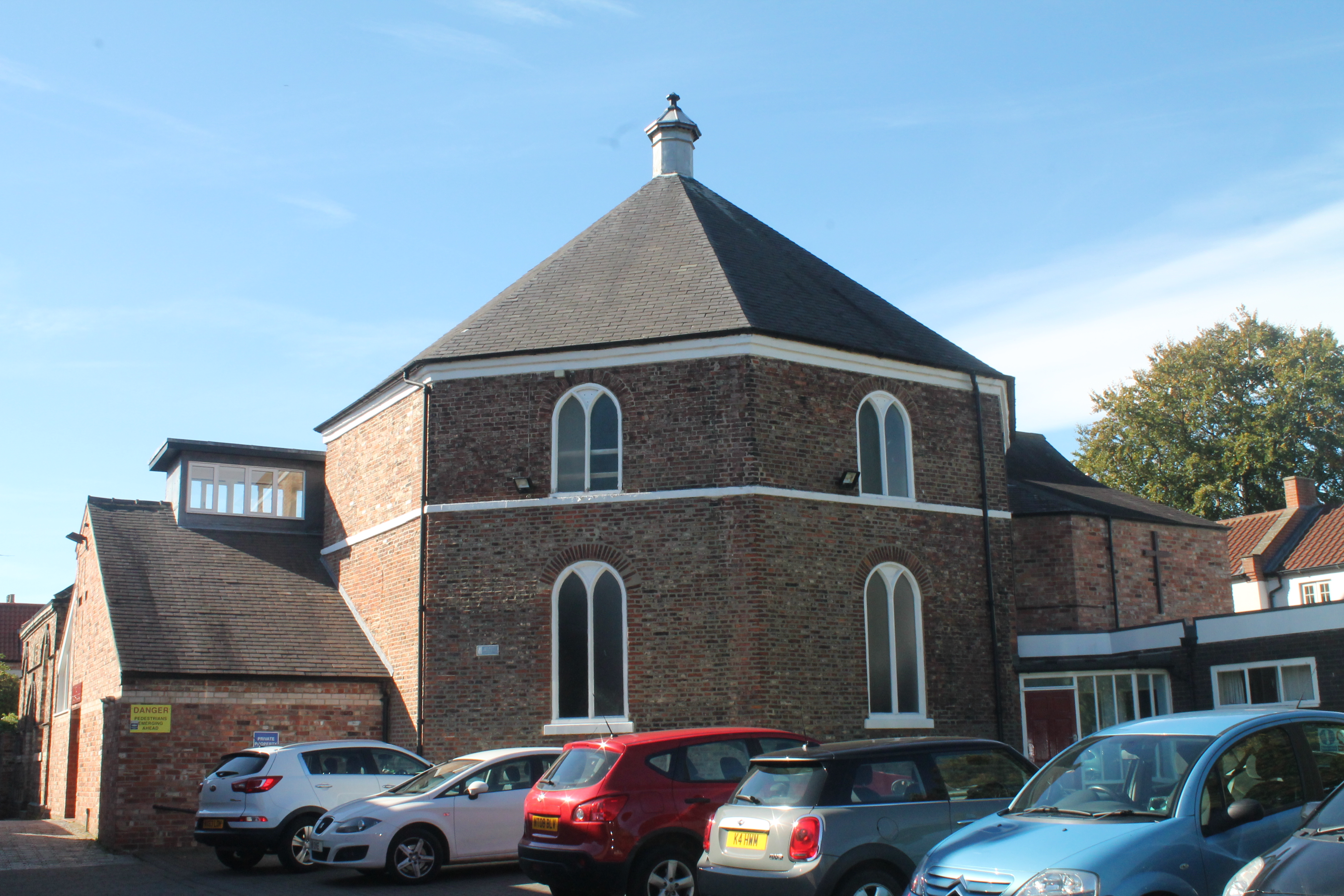
Yarm Methodist Church

Yarm Parish Church is the Anglican parish church, dedicated to St Mary Magdalene. It is situated on West Street, where there has been a church on the site since at least the 9th century. It was last rebuilt from the remains of the second, Norman, church in 1730. It is a Grade II* listed building. The Roman Catholic (RC) church of Ss Mary and Romuald, built in 1860, is at the south end of High Street. It is a Grade II listed building. Yarm Methodist Church, an octagonal church built in 1763, is on Chapel Yard, on the east side of the town by the river, and is the oldest octagonal church in current use in Methodism. It is a Grade II listed building.

== Media ==
Local news and television programmes are provided by BBC North East and Cumbria and ITV Tyne Tees, the local television station TalkTeesside also broadcasts to the area. Television signals are received from the Bilsdale TV transmitter. Local radio stations are BBC Radio Tees, Heart North East, Capital North East, Smooth North East, Greatest Hits Radio Teesside, Hits Radio Teesside and CVFM Radio, a community based radio station which broadcast from nearby Middlesbrough. The town is served by the local newspapers, TeessideLiveand The Northern Echo.

== Sport ==
Yarm Rugby Club is based at Wass Way, Eaglescliffe. The club has grown significantly since forming in February 1998. They run teams and training sessions for most ages from youth to seniors. Currently playing in Durham/Northumberland 3. Yarm Wolves is a team of the North East Rugby League.

Yarm Cricket Club is situated on Leven Road, and has been in existence since 1814. It runs three senior teams in the North Yorkshire and South Durham Cricket League, and four junior sides – under 11s, under 13s, under 15s and under 17s – who all play competitive cricket throughout the season. In recent years, Yarm's third team, who play on a Sunday, have been the most successful team in the club, winning the NYSD Sunday Division 1 on several occasions, along with the League and Cup double in 2008.

Yarm and Eaglescliffe FC play in the Northern Football League, it was established in 2017. Other sports facilities within Yarm include 4G football pitch, located at Conyers' School. This facility is operated by the Go-Sport group and has been the home ground for local adult and youth football clubs, including Yarm FC and Yarm Town Juniors. In 2016, the Go-Sport group hosted an FA-accredited 11-a-side Midweek Football League, contested by various local clubs, including TIBS F.C. from Thornaby and Ingleby Barwick. The winners of this inaugural trophy were L&H F.C., who had a 3–1 victory in the final.

== Community and culture ==
A charter to hold a weekly market was granted by King John in 1207. It is held on the second Sunday of each month. The market charter gave Yarm its historic status as a town.

=== Funfair ===
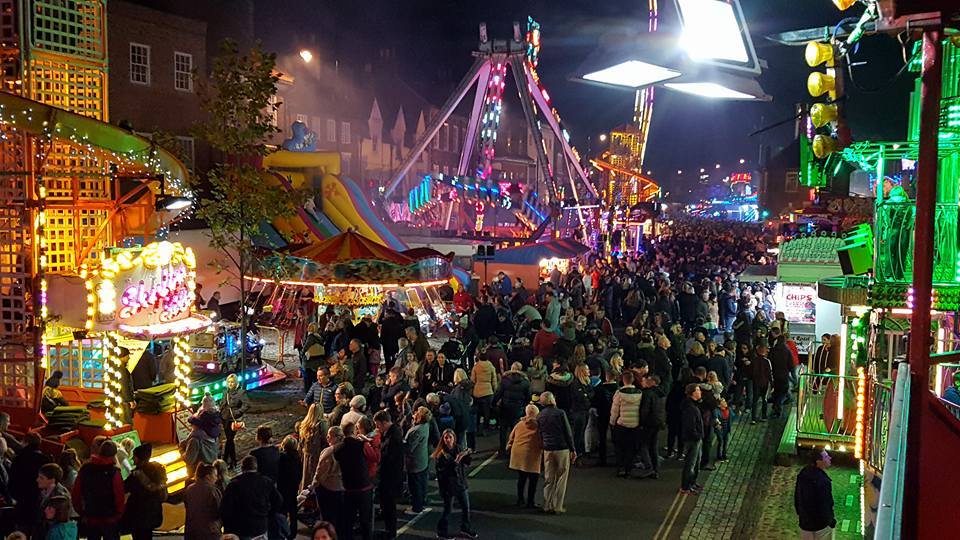
Yarm Fair, 2017

A funfair is held in High Street in the third week in October. The funfair tradition evolved from a historic cheese and livestock trading fair.

=== Venues ===
The Princess Alexandra Auditorium is a 750-seat venue opened in 2012 as a part of Yarm School’s redevelopment. A smaller Friarage Theatre is also on the site, with a 140-seat capacity.

== Education ==
There are three primary schools in the town:

- Levendale (single form entry)
- Yarm Primary School (two form entry)
- Layfield Primary School (single form entry)

Secondary education is provided at Conyers' School, and the town is home to the independent Yarm School.

== Twinned towns ==
Yarm is twinned with the towns of Vernouillet, France and Schwalbach am Taunus, Germany.

== Notable people ==
- Tom Brown, hero of the Battle of Dettingen and the last man to be knighted on the battlefield. His house survives on the High Street and dates from around 1480, the oldest standing dwelling in the former County of Cleveland
- Graham Farrow, playwright and screenwriter
- Janick Gers, Iron Maiden guitarist

== Sources ==
- Smailes, AE (1960). North England. Edinburgh: Thomas Nelson & Sons Ltd.
- Winn, Christopher (2010). I Never Knew That About Yorkshire. London: Random House. ISBN 978-0-09-193313-5.
