= List of schools in North Yorkshire =

This is a list of schools in the non-metropolitan county of North Yorkshire, England.

== State-funded schools ==
=== Primary schools ===
- Admiral Long CE Primary School, Burnt Yates
- Ainderby Steeple CE Primary School, Morton-on-Swale
- Airy Hill Primary School, Whitby
- Aiskew, Leeming Bar CE Primary School, Leeming Bar
- Alanbrooke Academy, Topcliffe
- All Saints RC Primary School, Thirsk
- All Saints CE School, Kirkby Overblow
- Alverton Primary School, Northallerton
- Amotherby Community Primary School, Amotherby
- Applegarth Primary School, Northallerton
- Appleton Roebuck Primary School, Appleton Roebuck
- Appleton Wiske Community Primary School, Appleton Wiske
- Askrigg Primary School, Askrigg
- Askwith Community Primary School, Askwith
- Aspin Park Academy, Knaresborough
- Athelstan Community Primary School, Sherburn-in-Elmet
- Austwick CE Primary School, Austwick
- Bainbridge CE Primary School, Bainbridge
- Barkston Ash RC Primary School, Barkston Ash
- Barlby Bridge Community Primary School, Barlby
- Barlby Community Primary School, Barlby
- Barlow CE Primary School, Barlow
- Barrowcliff School, Scarborough
- Barton CE Primary School, Barton
- Barwic Parade Community Primary School, Selby
- Beckwithshaw Community Primary School, Beckwithshaw
- Bedale CE Primary School, Bedale
- Bentham Community Primary School, Bentham
- Bilsdale Midcable Chop Gate CE Primary School, Chop Gate
- Bilton Grange Primary School, Harrogate
- Birstwith CE Primary School, Birstwith
- Bishop Monkton CE Primary School, Bishop Monkton
- Bolton-on-Swale St Mary's CE Primary School, Bolton-on-Swale
- Boroughbridge Primary School, Boroughbridge
- The Boyle and Petyt Primary School, Beamsley
- Bradleys Both Community Primary School, Bradley
- Braeburn Primary Academy, Eastfield
- Brayton CE Primary School, Brayton
- Brompton and Sawdon Community Primary School, Brompton-by-Sawdon
- Brompton Community Primary School, Brompton
- Brompton-on-Swale CE Primary School, Brompton-on-Swale
- Broomfield School, Northallerton
- Brotherton and Byram Community Primary Academy, Brotherton
- Burneston CE Primary School, Burneston
- Burnsall Primary School, Burnsall
- Burton Leonard CE Primary School, Burton Leonard
- Burton Salmon Community Primary School, Burton Salmon
- Camblesforth Community Primary Academy, Camblesforth
- Cambrai Primary School, Catterick Garrison
- Carleton Endowed CE Primary School, Carleton-in-Craven
- Carlton and Faceby CE Primary School, Carlton in Cleveland
- Carlton Miniott Primary Academy, Carlton Miniott
- Carlton Primary School, Carlton
- Carnagill Community Primary School, Catterick Garrison
- Castleton Primary School, Castleton
- Cawood CE Primary School, Cawood
- Cayton Community Primary School, Cayton
- Chapel Haddlesey CE Primary School, Chapel Haddlesey
- Christ Church CE Primary School, Skipton
- Cliffe Primary School, Cliffe
- Colburn Community Primary School, Colburn
- Cononley Community Primary School, Cononley
- Coppice Valley Primary School, Harrogate
- Cowling Community Primary School, Cowling
- Cracoe and Rylstone CE Primary School, Cracoe
- Crakehall CE Primary School, Crakehall
- Crayke CE Primary School, Crayke
- Croft CE Primary School, Croft-on-Tees
- Danby CE School, Danby
- Darley Primary School, Darley
- Dishforth Airfield Community Primary School, Dishforth Airfield
- Dishforth CE Primary School, Dishforth
- Easingwold Community Primary School, Easingwold
- East Ayton Community Primary School, East Ayton
- East Cowton CE Primary School, East Cowton
- East Whitby Primary Academy, Whitby
- Egton CE Primary School, Egton
- Embsay CE Primary School, Embsay
- Escrick CE Primary School, Escrick
- Fairburn Community Primary School, Fairburn
- Filey CE Infants Academy, Filey
- Filey Junior School, Filey
- Follifoot CE Primary School, Follifoot
- Forest of Galtres Anglican-Methodist Primary School, Shipton
- Foston CE Primary School, Foston
- Fountains CE Primary School, Grantley
- Friarage Community Primary School, Scarborough
- Fylingdales CE VC Primary School, Fylingthorpe
- Gargrave CE Primary School, Gargrave
- Giggleswick Primary School, Giggleswick
- Gillamoor CE Primary School, Gillamoor
- Gladstone Road Primary School, Scarborough
- Glaisdale Primary School, Glaisdale
- Glasshouses Community Primary School, Glasshouses
- Glusburn Community Primary School, Glusburn
- Goathland Primary School, Goathland
- Goldsborough CE Primary School, Goldsborough
- Grassington CE Primary School, Grassington
- Great Ouseburn Community Primary School, Great Ouseburn
- Great Smeaton School, Great Smeaton
- Greatwood Community Primary School, Skipton
- Green Hammerton CE Primary School, Green Hammerton
- Grewelthorpe CE Primary School, Grewelthorpe
- Grove Road Community Primary School, Harrogate
- Gunnerside Methodist Primary School, Gunnerside
- Hackforth and Hornby CE Primary School, Hackforth
- Hackness CE Primary School, Hackness
- Hambleton CE Primary School, Hambleton
- Hampsthwaite CE Primary School, Hampsthwaite
- Hawes Primary School, Hawes
- Hawsker Cum Stainsacre CE Primary School, Hawsker
- Hellifield Community Primary School, Hellifield
- Helmsley Community Primary School, Helmsley
- Hemingbrough Community Primary School, Hemingbrough
- Hensall Community Primary School, Hensall
- Hertford Vale CE Primary School, Staxton
- Hipswell CE Primary School, Hipswell
- Holy Trinity CE Infant School, Ripon
- Holy Trinity CE Junior School, Ripon
- Hookstone Chase Primary School, Harrogate
- Huby CE Primary School, Huby
- Hunmanby Primary School, Hunmanby
- Hunton and Arrathorne Community Primary School, Hunton
- Husthwaite CE Primary School, Husthwaite
- Hutton Rudby Primary School, Hutton Rudby
- Ingleby Greenhow CE Primary School, Ingleby Greenhow
- Ingleton Primary School, Ingleton
- Keeble Gateway Academy, Sowerby
- Kellington Primary School, Kellington
- Kettlesing Felliscliffe Community Primary School, Kettlesing
- Kettlewell Primary School, Kettlewell
- Kildwick CE Primary School, Kildwick
- Killinghall CE Primary School, Killinghall
- Kirby Hill CE Primary School, Kirby Hill
- Kirk Fenton CE Primary School, Church Fenton
- Kirk Hammerton CE Primary School, Kirk Hammerton
- Kirk Smeaton CE Primary School, Kirk Smeaton
- Kirkby and Great Broughton CE Primary School, Kirkby
- Kirkby Fleetham CE Primary School, Kirkby Fleetham
- Kirkby in Malhamdale United Primary School, Kirkby Malham
- Kirkby Malzeard CE Primary School, Kirkby Malzeard
- Kirkbymoorside Community Primary School, Kirkbymoorside
- Knaresborough St John's CE Primary School, Knaresborough
- Knayton CE Academy, Knayton
- Langton Primary School, Langton
- Le Cateau Community Primary School, Catterick Garrison
- Lealholm Primary School, Lealholm
- Leavening Community Primary School, Leavening
- Leeming and Londonderry Community Primary School, Leeming
- Leeming RAF Community Primary School, Gatenby
- Leyburn Primary School, Leyburn
- Lindhead School, Burniston
- Linton-on-Ouse Primary School, Linton-on-Ouse
- Long Marston CE Primary School, Long Marston
- Long Preston Endowed Primary School, Long Preston
- Longman's Hill Community Primary School, Brayton
- Lothersdale Primary School, Lothersdale
- Luttons Community Primary School, West Lutton
- Lythe CE Primary School, Lythe
- Malton Primary Academy, Malton
- Markington CE Primary School, Markington
- Marton-cum-Grafton CE Primary School, Marton
- Marwood CE Infant School, Great Ayton
- Masham CE Primary School, Masham
- Meadowside Academy, Knaresborough
- Melsonby Methodist Primary School, Melsonby
- Michael Syddall CE Aided Primary School, Catterick
- Middleham CE School, Middleham
- Mill Hill Primary School, Northallerton
- Monk Fryston CE Primary School, Monk Fryston
- Moorside Primary School, Ripon
- Nawton Community Primary School, Nawton
- New Park Primary Academy, Harrogate
- Newby and Scalby Primary School, Newby
- North and South Cowton Community Primary School, North Cowton
- North Duffield Community Primary School, North Duffield
- North Rigton CE Primary School, North Rigton
- North Stainley CE Primary School, North Stainley
- Northstead Community Primary School, Scarborough
- Norton Community Primary School, Norton-on-Derwent
- Nun Monkton Primary Foundation School, Nun Monkton
- Oakbridge CE Primary School, Northallerton
- Oakridge Community Primary School, Hinderwell
- Oatlands Community Junior School, Harrogate
- Oatlands Infant School, Harrogate
- Osmotherley Primary School, Osmotherley
- Outwood Primary Academy Alne, Alne
- Outwood Primary Academy Greystone, Ripon
- Overdale Community Primary School, Eastfield
- Pannal Primary School, Pannal
- Pickering Community Infant School, Pickering
- Pickering Community Junior School, Pickering
- Pickhill CE Primary School, Pickhill
- Ravensworth CE Primary School, Ravensworth
- Reeth Community Primary School, Reeth
- Riccall Community Primary School, Riccall
- Richard Taylor CE Primary School, Harrogate
- Richmond Methodist Primary School, Richmond
- Rillington Primary School, Rillington
- Ripley Endowed CE School, Ripley
- Ripon Cathedral CE Primary School, Ripon
- Riverside School, Tadcaster
- Roecliffe CE Primary School, Roecliffe
- Romanby Primary School, Romanby
- Roseberry Academy, Great Ayton
- Rosedale Abbey Community Primary School, Rosedale Abbey
- Rossett Acre Primary School, Harrogate
- Ruswarp CE Primary School, Ruswarp
- Sacred Heart RC Primary School, Northallerton
- St Benedict's RC Primary School, Ampleforth
- St Cuthbert's CE Primary School, Pateley Bridge
- St George's RC Primary School, Eastfield
- St Hedda's RC Primary School, Egton Bridge
- St Hilda's Ampleforth CE Primary School, Ampleforth
- St Joseph's RC Primary School, Harrogate
- St Joseph's RC Primary School, Pickering
- St Martin's CE Primary School, Scarborough
- St Mary's RC Primary School, Knaresborough
- St Mary's RC Primary School, Malton
- St Mary's RC Primary School, Richmond
- St Mary's RC Primary School, Selby
- St Nicholas CE Primary School, West Tanfield
- St Peter's Brafferton CE Primary School, Brafferton
- St Peter's CE Primary School, Harrogate
- St Peter's RC Primary School, Scarborough
- St Robert's RC Primary School, Harrogate
- St Stephen's RC Primary School, Skipton
- St Wilfrid's RC Primary School, Ripon
- Saltergate Community Junior School, Harrogate
- Saltergate Infant School, Harrogate
- Sand Hutton CE Primary School, Sand Hutton
- Saxton CE Primary School, Saxton
- Scotton Lingerfield Community Primary School, Scotton
- Seamer and Irton Community Primary School, Seamer
- Selby Abbey CE Primary School, Selby
- Selby Community Primary School, Selby
- Seton Community Primary School, Staithes
- Sessay CE VC Primary School, Sessay
- Settle CE Primary School, Settle
- Settrington All Saints' CE Primary School, Settrington
- Sharow CE Primary School, Sharow
- Sherburn CE Primary School, Sherburn
- Sherburn Hungate Primary School, Sherburn-in-Elmet
- Sheriff Hutton Primary School, Sheriff Hutton
- Sicklinghall Community Primary School, Sicklinghall
- Sinnington Community Primary School, Sinnington
- Skipton Parish Church CE Primary School, Skipton
- Sleights CE Primary School, Sleights
- Slingsby Community Primary School, Slingsby
- Snainton CE Primary School, Snainton
- Snape Community Primary School, Snape
- South Kilvington CE Primary Academy, South Kilvington
- South Milford Primary School, South Milford
- South Otterington CE Primary School, South Otterington
- Sowerby Primary Academy, Sowerby
- Spennithorne CE Primary School, Spennithorne
- Spofforth CE Primary School, Spofforth
- Stakesby Primary Academy, Whitby
- Starbeck Primary Academy, Harrogate
- Staveley Community Primary School, Staveley
- Staynor Hall Primary Academy, Selby
- Stillington Primary School, Stillington
- Stokesley Primary Academy, Stokesley
- Summerbridge Primary School, Summerbridge
- Sutton-in-Craven CE Primary School, Sutton-in-Craven
- Sutton-in-Craven Community Primary School, Sutton-in-Craven
- Sutton on the Forest CE Primary School, Sutton-on-the-Forest
- Tadcaster Primary Academy, Tadcaster
- Terrington CE Primary School, Terrington
- Thirsk Community Primary School, Thirsk
- Thomas Hinderwell Primary Academy, Scarborough
- Thornton Dale CE Primary School, Thornton-le-Dale
- Thornton in Craven Community Primary School, Thornton in Craven
- Thornton Watlass CE Primary School, Thornton Watlass
- Thorpe Willoughby Community Primary School, Thorpe Willoughby
- Threshfield School, Threshfield
- Tockwith CE Primary Academy, Tockwith
- Topcliffe CE Academy, Topcliffe
- Trinity Academy Eppleby Forcett, Eppleby
- Trinity Academy Middleton Tyas, Middleton Tyas
- Trinity Academy Richmond, Richmond
- Warthill CE Primary School, Warthill
- Water Street Community Primary School, Skipton
- Wavell Community Infant School, Catterick Garrison
- Wavell Community Junior School, Catterick Garrison
- Welburn Community Primary School, Welburn
- West Burton CE Primary School, West Burton
- West Cliff Primary School, Whitby
- West Heslerton CE Primary School, West Heslerton
- Western Primary School, Harrogate
- Wheatcroft Community Primary School, Scarborough
- Whitley and Eggborough Community Primary School, Whitley
- Willow Tree Community Primary School, Harrogate
- Wistow Parochial CE Primary School, Wistow
- Wykeham CE Primary School, Wykeham

=== Non-selective secondary schools ===
- Barlby High School, Barlby
- Bedale High School, Bedale
- Boroughbridge High School, Boroughbridge
- Brayton Academy, Brayton
- Caedmon College, Whitby
- Eskdale School, Whitby
- Filey School, Filey
- George Pindar School, Eastfield
- Graham School, Scarborough
- Harrogate Grammar School, Harrogate
- Harrogate High School, Harrogate
- Holy Family Catholic High School, Carlton
- King James's School, Knaresborough
- Lady Lumley's School, Pickering
- Malton School, Malton
- Nidderdale High School, Pateley Bridge
- Northallerton School, Northallerton
- Norton College, Norton-on-Derwent
- Outwood Academy Easingwold, Easingwold
- Outwood Academy Ripon, Ripon
- Richmond School, Richmond
- Risedale School, Catterick Garrison
- Rossett School, Harrogate
- Ryedale School, Nawton
- St Aidan's Church of England High School, Harrogate
- St Augustine's Catholic School, Scarborough
- St Francis Xavier School, Richmond
- St. John Fisher Catholic High School, Harrogate
- Scalby School, Newby
- Scarborough University Technical College, Scarborough
- Selby High School, Selby
- Settle College, Settle
- Sherburn High School, Sherburn-in-Elmet
- The Skipton Academy, Skipton
- South Craven School, Cross Hills
- Stokesley School, Stokesley
- Tadcaster Grammar School, Tadcaster
- Thirsk School and Sixth Form College, Sowerby
- Upper Wharfedale School, Threshfield
- The Wensleydale School, Leyburn

=== Grammar schools ===
- Ermysted's Grammar School, Skipton
- Ripon Grammar School, Ripon
- Skipton Girls' High School, Skipton

=== Special and alternative schools ===
- Brompton Hall School, Brompton-by-Sawdon
- Brooklands School, Skipton
- Craven Pupil Referral Service, Skipton
- The Dales School, Morton-on-Swale
- Forest Moor School, Darley
- Mowbray School, Bedale
- The Rubicon Centre, Selby
- Scarborough Pupil Referral Unit, Scarborough
- Springhead School, Scarborough
- Springwater School, Harrogate
- Springwell Harrogate, Harrogate
- The Sunbeck Centre, Northallerton
- Welburn Hall School, Kirkbymoorside
- The Woodlands Academy, Scarborough

=== Further education ===
- Craven College
- Scarborough Sixth Form College
- Scarborough TEC
- Selby College

== Independent schools ==
=== Primary and preparatory schools ===
- Aysgarth School, Newton-le-Willows
- Belmont Grosvenor School, Birstwith
- Brackenfield School, Harrogate
- Terrington Hall School, Terrington
- Wharfedale Montessori School, Skipton

=== Senior and all-through schools ===
- Ampleforth College, Ampleforth
- Ashville College, Harrogate
- Cundall Manor School, Cundall
- Fyling Hall School, Robin Hood's Bay
- Giggleswick School, Giggleswick
- Harrogate Ladies' College, Harrogate
- Queen Ethelburga's Collegiate, Thorpe Underwood
- Queen Margaret's School, Escrick
- Queen Mary's School, Topcliffe
- Read School, Drax
- Scarborough College, Scarborough

=== Special and alternative schools ===
- Breckenbrough School, Sandhutton
- Cambian Scarborough School, Eastfield
- Cambian Spring Hill School, Ripon
- Cedar House School, Low Bentham
- Clervaux Garden School, Croft-on-Tees
- Stonegate School, Low Bentham
- Strive for Education, Harrogate
