= Wakefield City Academies Trust =

Multi-academy trust

Coordinates: 53.650°N 1.387°W

- Formation: December 7, 2010; 15 years ago
- Type: Multi-academy trust
- Purpose: Education
- Location: The Nostell Estate, Wakefield, WF4 1AB
- Key people: Chris Pickering, CEO
- Website: wcatrust.org

Wakefield City Academies Trust (WCAT) was a multi-academy trust (MAT) that managed 21 schools (14 primary and 7 secondary) across West Yorkshire, South Yorkshire, and the East Riding of Yorkshire. As an academy trust, it was an exempt charity regulated by the Department for Education (DfE).

In September 2017, WCAT announced it would cease operations and dissolve once new sponsor organisations were found for its schools.

== Schools ==
=== Primary ===
The trust operated 14 primary schools across South Yorkshire and West Yorkshire.

- Barkerend Academy, Bradford
- Bell Lane Academy, Pontefract
- Brookfield Primary Academy, Mexborough
- Carr Lodge Academy, Doncaster
- Havercroft Academy, Wakefield
- Heathview Academy, Wakefield
- High Crags Academy, Shipley
- Kinsley Academy, Pontefract
- Montagu Academy, Mexborough
- Morley Place Academy, Doncaster
- Thornbury Academy, Bradford
- Waverley Academy, Doncaster
- West End Academy, Pontefract
- Willow Academy, Doncaster

=== Secondary ===
The trust operated seven secondary schools across East Yorkshire, South Yorkshire and West Yorkshire.

- Balby Carr Community Academy, Doncaster
- The Freeston Academy, Normanton
- Goole High School, Goole
- Hemsworth Arts and Community Academy, Pontefract
- Mexborough Academy, Mexborough
- Wakefield City Academy, Wakefield
- Yewlands Academy, Sheffield

Create Studio, a 14–19 studio school in Goole, was managed by WCAT before it closed in August 2015.

== History ==
Wakefield City Academies Trust was founded in late 2010, with its first school, Wakefield City Academy, joining the trust in January 2011.

Alan Yellup, CEO of the trust, was awarded an OBE for services to Education in the Queen's 2014 Birthday Honours.

In July 2015, WCAT became the third academy trust to receive a focused inspection from Ofsted. The trust was praised, with the report finding it to be "making a positive difference" to pupils.

In November 2015, WCAT was one of 5 "top performing" academy trusts to receive a share of £5m government grant funding to improve schools in the north of England.

CEO Alan Yellup left WCAT in March 2016, with former chairman Mike Ramsey appointed interim CEO.

In the autumn of 2016, the trust was criticised for its financial practices. In October, it was reported that the trust had made payments of £440,000 to companies owned by its interim CEO, Mike Ramsey and his daughter. In November, a report by the DfE's Education Funding Agency of findings from an investigation into WCAT was leaked. It found 16 breaches of official guidance and revealed "extreme concern" in response to Ramsey being paid £82,000 for 15 weeks of work.

In late 2016, WCAT pulled out of taking on sponsorship of Hanson Academy and University Academy Keighley, two Bradford secondary schools.

WCAT appointed Chris Pickering as its new CEO in May 2017. Pickering previously led Diverse Academies Trust.

=== Request to stop operating ===
In September 2017, Wakefield City Academies Trust requested to stop operating all of its 21 schools because it could not make the "rapid improvement our academies need and our students deserve". Five of its schools had been rated inadequate by Ofsted. The Department for Education agreed to the transfer of all WCAT schools to new sponsor organisations, with the trust continuing to operate during the "re-brokering" process. The announcement prompted local MP Yvette Cooper to call for a review of accountability in multi-academy trusts and a public petition to return the schools to local authority control.

Records were released in October 2017 indicating that plans to transfer schools away from WCAT had existed since December 2016. At that time, it was planned to re-broker 10 schools to other academy trusts, leaving WCAT "with a viable, manageable and sustainable MAT."

In October 2017, the Department for Education announced details of which academy trusts were its "preferred sponsors" for the WCAT schools and began a period of consultation with interested parties.

=== Transfer of assets ===
In October 2017, Wakefield City Academies Trust was accused of "asset stripping" when it was reported to have transferred funds away from the schools it managed, including hundreds of thousands of pounds raised for them by volunteers. The transferred funds stood to be lost included:

- Up to £800,000 from Wakefield City Academy
- £436,000 from Hemsworth Arts and Community Academy
- £300,000 from Heath View Primary School
- £178,000 from High Crags Academy primary school, which had joined WCAT in April 2016.

In December 2017, West Yorkshire Police confirmed they were investigating WCAT's conduct after receiving information from Wakefield Council. The investigation ended in April 2018, with the police concluding in a statement that "no crimes have been recorded."

The Education and Skills Funding Agency published a 2016 financial and governance review of WCAT in November 2018. The report showed that the government had advised the trust to pool surplus school funds centrally.

=== New sponsors ===
The Department for Education confirmed the new sponsors for most WCAT schools in January 2018 and the new Balby Carr Community Academy sponsor at the end of March 2018. Changes following the consultation were that Kinsley Academy and West End Academy, primary schools initially earmarked for transfer Outwood Grange Academies Trust, would instead join Waterton Academy Trust. Decisions that "reflect the views of parents and staff".

Concerns over high costs related to Mexborough Academy's private finance initiative contract delayed its transfer. In November 2018, it joined the DfE's preferred sponsor, Delta Academies Trust.

New sponsor	School
Outwood Grange Academies Trust	Bell Lane Academy
Outwood Grange Academies Trust	Havercroft Academy
Outwood Grange Academies Trust	Heath View Academy
Outwood Grange Academies Trust	Hemsworth Academy
Outwood Grange Academies Trust	The Freeston Academy
Outwood Grange Academies Trust	Wakefield City Academy
Delta Academies Trust	Morley Place Academy
Delta Academies Trust	Goole High School
Delta Academies Trust	Mexborough Academy
Delta Academies Trust	Montagu Academy
Tauheedul Education Trust	Barkerend Academy
Tauheedul Education Trust	High Crags Primary School
Tauheedul Education Trust	Thornbury Academy
Astrea Academy Trust	Waverley Academy
Astrea Academy Trust	Balby Carr Community Academy
Waterton Academy Trust	Kinsley Academy
Waterton Academy Trust	West End Academy
Aston Community Education Trust	Brookfield Primary Academy
Brigantia Learning Trust	Yewlands Academy
Inspiring Futures Academy Trust	Willow Academy
Exceed Learning Partnership	Carr Lodge Academy

=== Winding up ===
WCAT ended its 2018 financial year with over £2m in cash. The trust said it expected to have reserves when it wound up and stated that any surplus would be used for the benefit of students. Its February 2019 accounts stated a cash balance of over £1m. In June 2019, WCAT confirmed it had returned an undisclosed sum to the Department for Education. Mary Creagh, MP for Wakefield, called for the return of the funds to "the schools who were so badly affected by the trust's collapse".

In October 2019, WCAT entered into liquidation and ceased operation. The remaining funds were sufficient to cover outstanding liabilities, but none remained to return to the trust's former schools.
