= Ingleby Barwick =

Town and civil parish in North Yorkshire, England

Coordinates: 54.519°N 1.311°W

- Town and civil parish
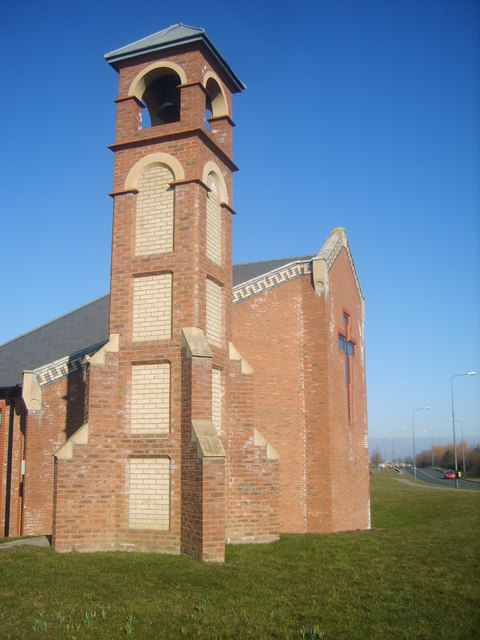
- St Francis Church, Ingleby Barwick

- Location within North Yorkshire
- Population: 20,378 (2011 census)
- OS grid reference: NZ445140
- Civil parish: Ingleby Barwick
- Unitary authority: Stockton-on-Tees
- Ceremonial county: North Yorkshire
- Region: North East
- Country: England
- Sovereign state: United Kingdom
- Post town: STOCKTON-ON-TEES
- Postcode district: TS17
- Dialling code: 01642
- Police: Cleveland
- Fire: Cleveland
- Ambulance: North East
- UK Parliament: Stockton West
- Website: Town council website

Ingleby Barwick is a town and civil parish in the Borough of Stockton-on-Tees, North Yorkshire, England. It is south of the River Tees and north-east of the River Leven.

Large scale development of the town started in the late 1970s on farm land south-west of Thornaby, the first development being officially opened on 30 July 1981 by the mayor of Stockton-on-Tees. The parish gained town status in 2007.

In 2011, the population of the civil parish of Ingleby Barwick was 20,378, its two electoral wards (which also include the settlements of Hilton, Maltby, High Leven and Low Leven) had a population of 21,045.

== Etymology ==
Ingleby Barwick was originally two settlements under a single joint parish, it is common to shorten the name to Ingleby in speech unless disambiguation is needed. Ingleby is derived from Old Norse Englar+by, a group of Angles' place. Barwick is of Anglo-Saxon in origin, Bere is Old English for barley and Wick means farm.

A '-by' suffix is a homophone to the word 'bee' and such place with the suffix are common locally: Maltby, Thornaby and Coulby Newham. The by-laws are remnant of by's use as a word for a place type, the word itself has come to be pronounced in this case as a homophone to 'bye'. Ingleby is a common name around Yorkshire. Ingleby Arncliffe and Ingleby Greenhow are notably within a ten-mile distance from the town and in the same county, North Yorkshire.

This name is pronounced two ways. One way Barwick is pronounced is Bar-ick, this loss is traditional and also seen with Berwick-upon-Tweed. The second way of pronouncing is closer to how the individual words evolved in English and how the name is spelt, Bar-wick. This reflects the name's origin as two separate words. Both ways are common in Ingleby Barwick itself.

== History ==
=== Prehistoric and ancient ===
The settlement of Ingleby Barwick has been occupied for thousands of years. There are traces of human occupation from as far back as the Stone Age. Work at a former farm discovered prolific multi period flintwork and Iron Age field patterns in the town.

A salvage excavation was carried out on the former Windmills Fields of the town, at the end of 1996. Five individual burials were found along with a wooden cist, these finds were accompanied by objects containing stone, jet and copper alloy of high status. This site was considered of European significance as it threw new light on the settlement of the area in the Bronze Age and highlighted a change in tradition of burial traditions and trade networks at this time.

A Roman settlement is also apparent in the town and a Roman Villa, was excavated in part. This has been preserved as public open space at Condercum Green in The Rings area of Ingleby Barwick. Building work at Quarry Farm discovered prolific concentrations of multi period flintwork along the South Bank of the River Tees and traces of Iron Age field patterns were discovered. A Roman Villa c. 200 AD, perhaps the most northerly in UK, was excavated in part. The "official" report on the excavation was published in 2013 with the title "A Roman Villa at the Edge of Empire" ( ISBN 978-1-902771-90-8 )

=== Norman era ===
After the Norman Conquest in 1066, the Manor of Barwick was given to Robert Malet, the son of William Malet, William the Conqueror's great chamberlain. In the 13th century the land was owned by the Priors of Guisborough Priory and Jervaulx Abbey until the Dissolution of the Monasteries. Between the 14th and 16th centuries landowners in the area included the Percys of Northumberland and the Parrs of Nottingham.

=== Renaissance ===
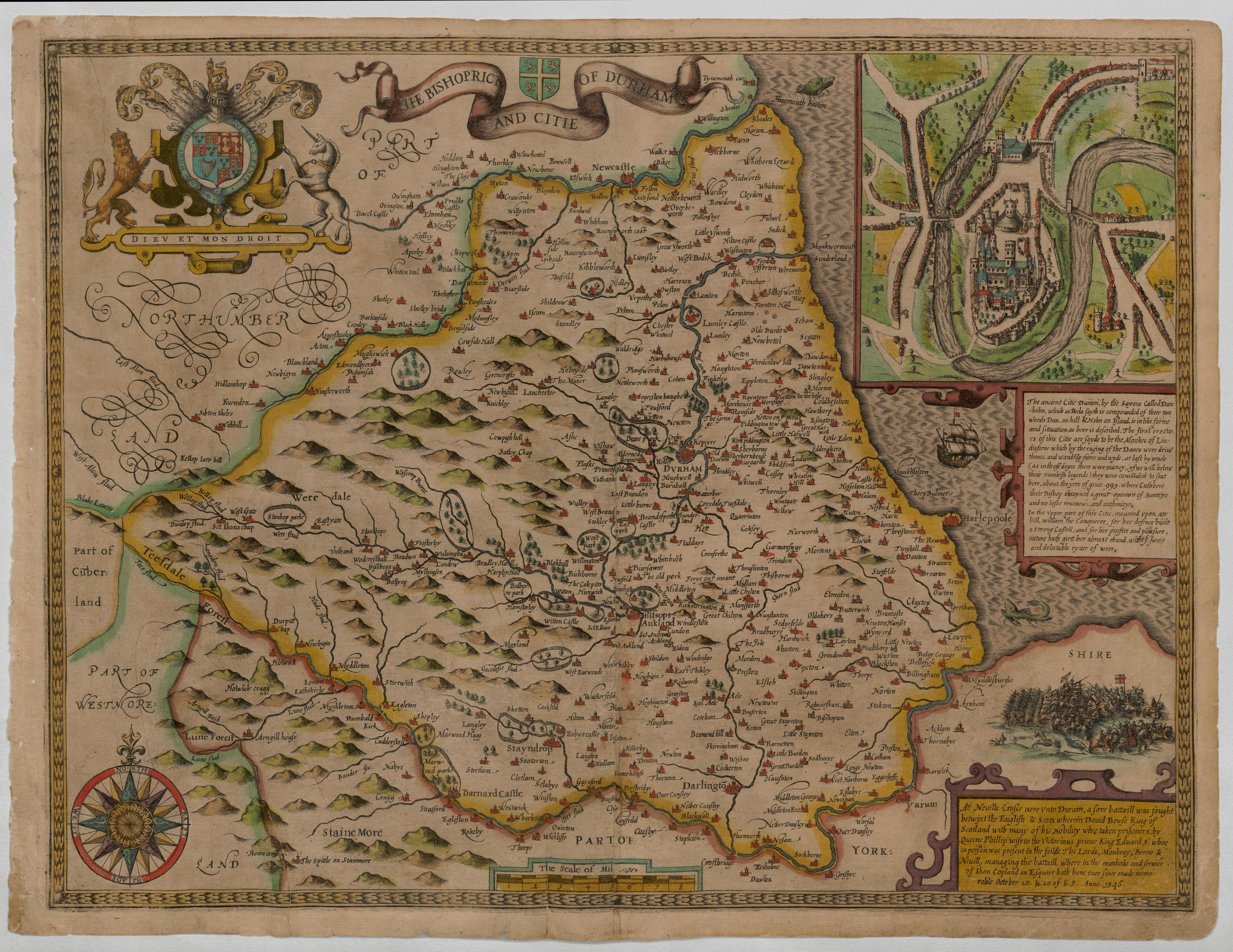
Barwick shown on The Bishoprice and Citie of Durham map, c. 1611 by John Speed, just south of the Tees between Yarum and Thornabye in Yorkshire

The Middle Ages are considered to have ended with the Renaissance in the mid 15th century. In the 17th century the Manor of Barwick was sold to Sir Thomas Lynch, Governor of Jamaica and then to Sir William Turner of Kirkleatham.

=== Modern ===
After 1611, it is not known when the two separate places of Barwick and Ingleby combined their names or if Ingleby developed as a separate settlement or spawned from and then re-merged with Barwick. The land was in the ownership of the Turners, with them gaining profits from the land used to support a free school and hospital at Kirkleatham.

==== Industrial revolution ====
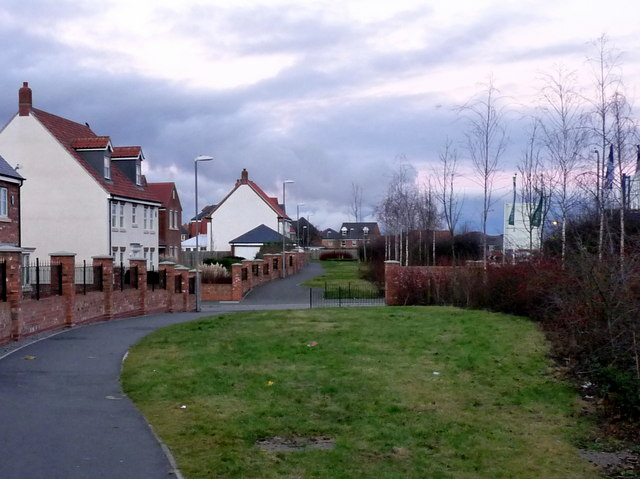
Site of an old road from Barwick Farm to the former Quarry, incorporated into the paving layout

The north of Ingleby Barwick was formerly quarried for Whinstone. Much of this area now forms Ingleby Barwick Golf Academy and northern part of The Rings. Evidence of a tramway system and jetty on historic Ordnance Survey maps suggest that the Whinstone was exported by boat.

Ingleby Barwick is listed as being a township in the parish of Stainton in 1887. Its population was given as 132. During this time the land was sold off by the Turner estate.

==== World wars ====
During the Second World War Ingleby Barwick stood near to the south-western perimeter of Thornaby Airfield and a number of aircraft crashed where Ingleby Barwick now stands. On 11 June 1940 a Coastal Command Lockheed Hudson crashed at Quarry Farm killing the four crew after the bomb load exploded on crashing. On 28 April 1941 a Bristol Blenheim crashed at Barwick Lane killing all three crew. On 18 December 1941 a Lockheed Hudson stalled soon after take off and crashed into Quarry Farm killing the five crew and four civilians. On 4 September 1942 a Lockheed Hudson crashed at Myton House Farm killing the four crew. The last aircraft accident was a Photo Reconnaissance de Havilland Mosquito which was attempting to land at Thornaby on one engine and crashed into land which is now home to Ingleby Mill School on 11 November 1943 killing both crew members; there is now a stone marking the crash site.

==== Farms ====
There are still a number of farmhouses that pre-date the 1980s-onward development.

- Low Farm. One of the buildings is incorporated in the Teal Arms pub.
- Cleveland View on Barwick Lane is another former farm building, belonging originally to Lane House Farm.
- There are original buildings from Ingleby Hill Farm at the end of Heddon Grove, now residential.
- Ingleby Close Farm buildings, which lie on land originally occupied by Betty's Close Farm, now residential, lie between Crosswell Park and Trevine Gardens.
- The original Myton House Farm site is marked by the public house that bears its name. The pub's website says "Formally (sic) a farmhouse..."
- Ingleby Hill Farm, an early 19th–century, late Georgian, grade II listed farmhouse.
- White House Farm, converted into houses around the late 2000s to early 2010s.

==== Mills ====
- Black Mill on Raydale Beck is the remnant of a corn mill built on the original Sober Hall Farm, now residential.
- The Old Mill at the southern end of Barwick Lane is now a bed and breakfast

== Governance ==
=== Town council ===
Previously under the Maltby and Ingleby Barwick Parish Council, the parish council split in 1990. Ingleby Barwick Parish Council became a town council in 2007 by passing a resolution under the Local Government Act 1972 s245(6), therefore giving the settlement town status.

It has 6 councillors from 4 May 2023, rather than the 12 previously allocated, due to a Boundary Commission error. The town council manage The Rings Community Hub Rings and the war memorial in Romano Park.

In 2021 the council attracted controversy after they declined a request for the council to fly the pride flag during pride month.

2023 Stockton on Tees Parish Elections – Ingleby Barwick North Ward
Party	Candidate	Votes	%	±%
Conservative	James Irwin	Uncontested		
Independent	Ted Strike		Uncontested	
Conservative	Sally Ann Watson		Uncontested	

==== Coat of Arms ====
Arms of Ingleby Barwick Town Council
- Crest: On a Wreath Or and Gules a Teal proper supporting with the dexter wing a Garb Or.
- Shield: Or three barrulets wavy Azure over all three Mill-rinds Gules.
- Motto: Stepping Stones To The Future
- Granted in October 2000.

The Coat of Arms was given to the town in October 2000. It contains: a representation of the three rivers that run around Ingleby Barwick; depictions of mill-rinds which are an historical link to the Turner family, who used to own most of the land which now forms the town, and the Barwick element of the name.

The crest shows a Teal bird which refers to a horse named Teal, trained at Middleham by Captain Neville Crump, which won the Grand National in 1952. The Teal Arms in the town is also a reference to the horse.

=== Borough and county ===
Historically the town is part of the North Riding of Yorkshire which was a county from 1899 to 1974. From 1894 to 1932, the parish was in the Middlesbrough Rural District then Stokesley Rural District from 1932 until 1974.

Ingleby Barwick then became a part of the Cleveland non-metropolitan district of Stockton-on-Tees in 1974 until 1996. Since the county was abolished in 1996, Ingleby is now placed into non-administrative North Yorkshire, governed by the direct successor unitary authority of Stockton-on-Tees.

Ingleby Barwick, as part of the Borough of Stockton on Tees, has six borough councillors representing the two wards Ingleby Barwick East (including Hilton and Maltby parishes) and Ingleby Barwick West (with High Leven and Low Leven). As of 2019 the community has been represented by independent councillors and those from the Conservative party and Ingleby Barwick Independent Society (IBIS).

They are currently six councillors that represent the town's wards.

- Ingleby Barwick East ward is represented by:
  - Ted Strike (independent)
  - Alan Watson (Conservative)
  - Sally Ann Watson (Conservative)
- Ingleby Barwick West ward:
  - Ken Dixon (Ingleby Barwick Independent Society)
  - Kevin Faulks (Ingleby Barwick Independent Society)
  - Ross Patterson (Ingleby Barwick Independent Society)

== Demography ==
Historical population of Ingleby Barwick
Year	1881	1891	1901	1911	1921	1931	1951	1961	2001	2011	2016
Population	132	115	124	147	118	133	141	113	16,280	21,045	22,290

Data from the 2001 census
Demographic	Ingleby Barwick	Stockton-On-Tees	England
Total population	16,280	178,408	49,138,831
Long-term illness	9.31%	19.86%	17.93%
Unemployed	2.35%	4.98%	3.35%
Aged 75+	1.59%	6.41%	7.6%
Mean age	31.87	37.97	38.6
Ethnic white	95.46%	96.22%	86.99%
Christian	81.34%	81.58%	71.8%
Married or remarried	64.6%	53.2%	50.9%

The 2001 United Kingdom census found Ingleby Barwick had 5,862 households and a population of 16,280, of which 8,272 were male and 8,008 female.

The town consists largely of owner-occupied properties and private rental properties making up 98% of the population. Council housing makes up the other 2%.

Ethnic diversity is minimal in Ingleby Barwick. Over 95% of residents class themselves as White British. The population is generally younger than average for Stockton-On-Tees with a mean age of 31.87 highlighting the high proportion of families with children in the town. In 2011 however, 92% of Ingleby Barwick's 21,045 residents were White British, 5.2% Asian and 0.4% Black.

Residents of Ingleby Barwick tend to have attained a higher level of education compared with Stockton-On-Tees and nationally. Over 25% of residents reported attaining a degree or higher level HNC/HND or NVQ compared with only 15% in Stockton as a whole.

The people of Ingleby Barwick enjoy a high employment rate, with 75% reporting themselves as being in full or part-time employment or being self-employed. Of these 76% usually travel to work by car or van, travelling an average distance of 21 km. Only 2.7% get to work on foot suggesting that most of the employment is from outside of Ingleby Barwick. The largest industry of employment was manufacturing accounting for 16.6% of the workforce. 50% of those working were in roles either in professional occupations or in companies at senior managerial levels.

Continued development of the area means the population of the town is expanding dramatically. Estimates put the population of Ingleby Barwick at 22,290 in mid 2016.

== Geography ==
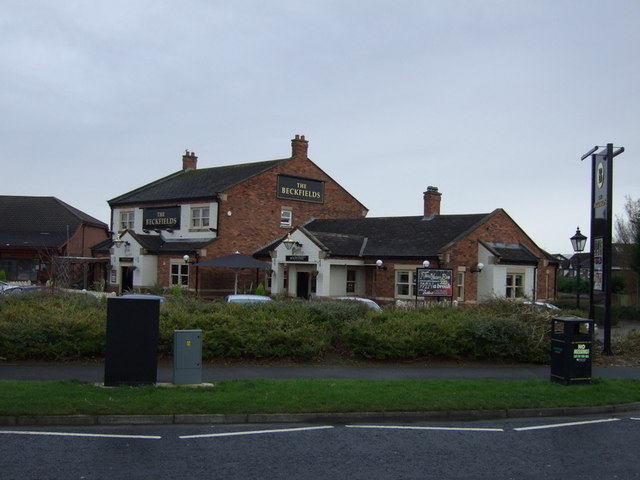
The Beckfields public house

The town is divided into several areas that include:

- Ingleby Barwick Centre
- Lowfields
- Beckfields,
- Sober Hall
- Round Hill, named after the adjacent scheduled ancient monument
- Broom Hill
- The Rings, named after the prehistoric settlements.

=== Rivers, Streams and Ponds ===
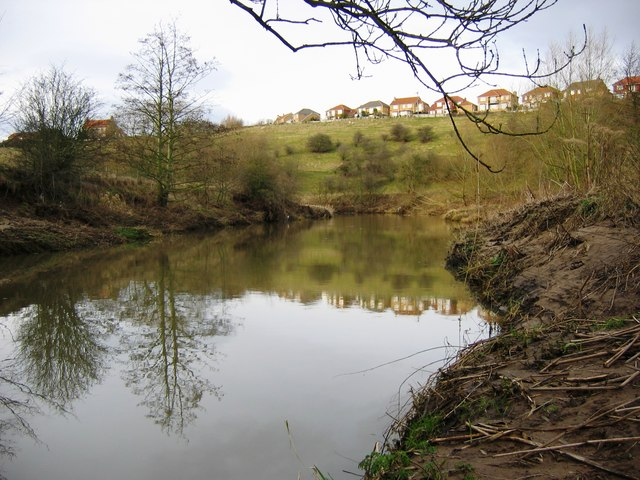
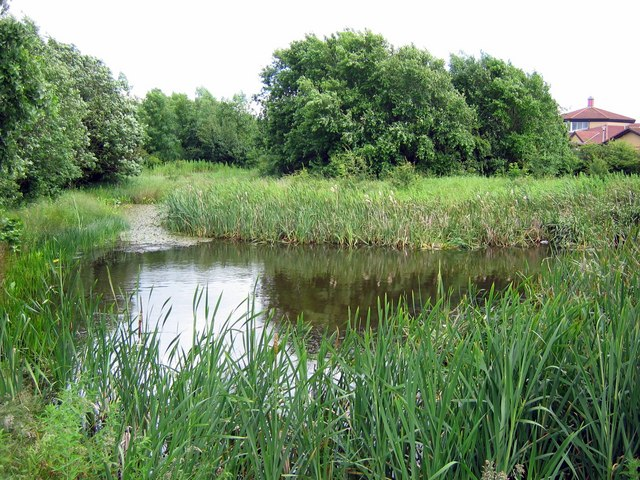
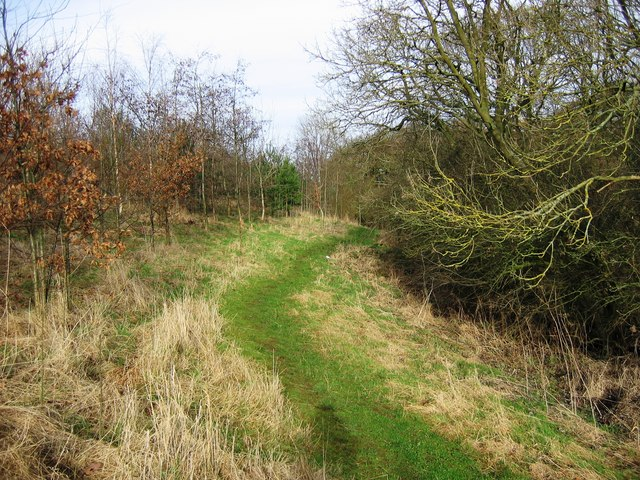
1.River Leven

2.Barwick Pond

3.Path following Baselton Beck

Ingleby Barwick is surrounded by water on three sides. It is bordered by the Leven to the south and west, the Tees to the north and west, and Bassleton Beck to the east. Barwick pond, in the centre of the town, is a small Local Nature Reserve.

=== Barwick Farm ===
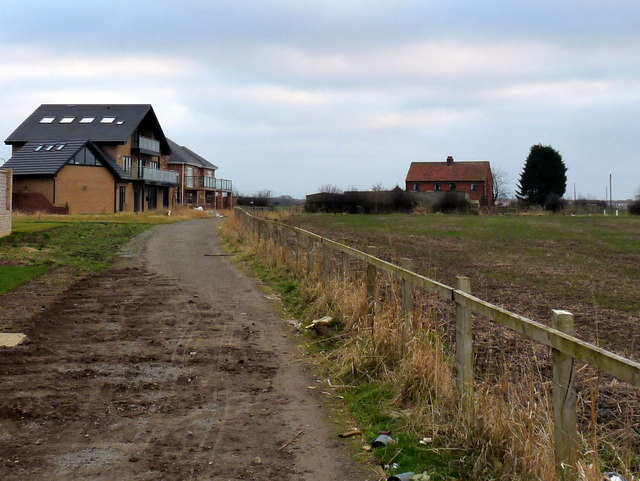
Path at the edge of The Rings housing with the Barwick House Farm site to the right

Barwick Farm is an operating farm adjacent to The Rings. The main spinal path (Barwick Lane) through Ingleby Barwick was originally the access road for this farm.

== Sport ==
Ingleby Barwick is home to a football club – Thornaby & Ingleby Barwick Football Club – known as 'TIBS' and is based at Thornaby Road. It has a senior men's team playing in the North Riding Football League.

There are also 3G and 4G football pitches available at the two secondary schools – All Saints and Ingleby Manor – as well at Bannatyne's leisure complex.

Ingleby Barwick Golf Course is a nine-hole venue with full facilities including an American Golf shop – which is also home to a floodlight driving range which is the only double decker version in the North of England.

Ingleby is home to a 25-metre swimming pool at the IB Leisure complex.

Angling takes place along the banks of the River Tees that run through Ingleby Barwick. The north bank is controlled by the Thornaby Angling Association and the south by the Lower Tees Angling Association.

== Transport ==
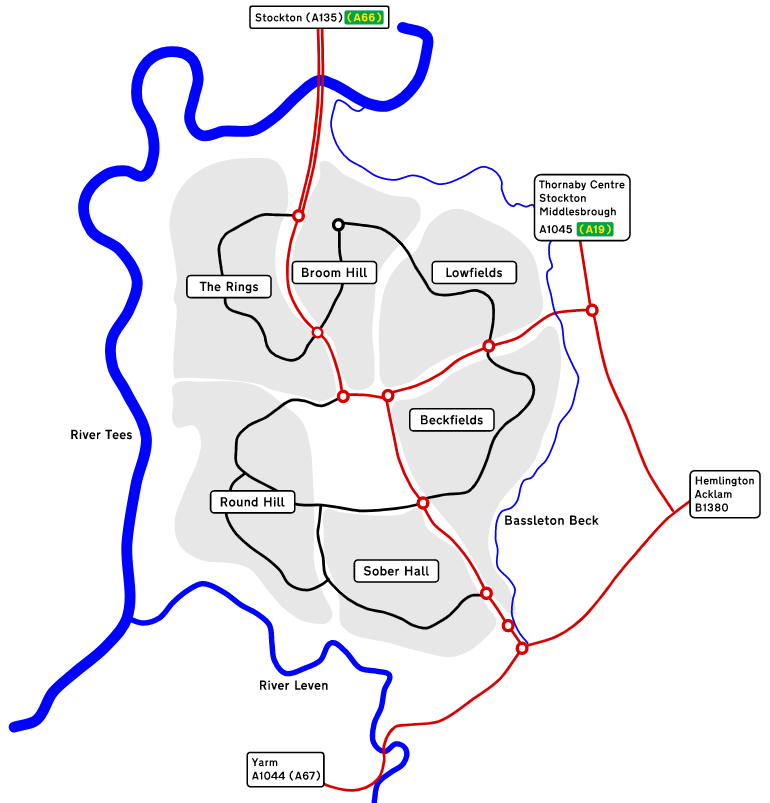
Map of Ingleby Barwick

=== Road ===
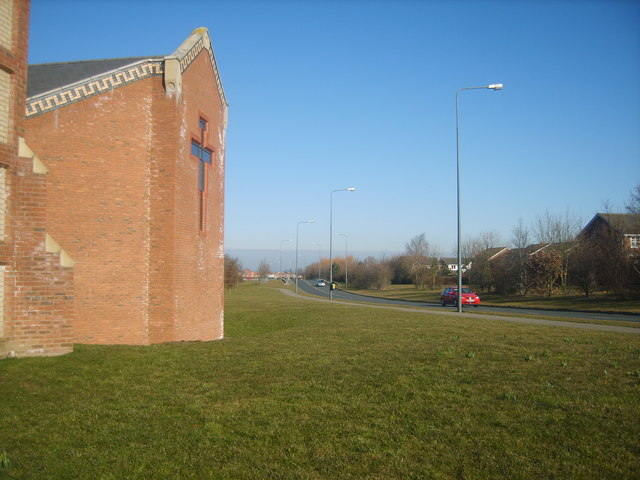
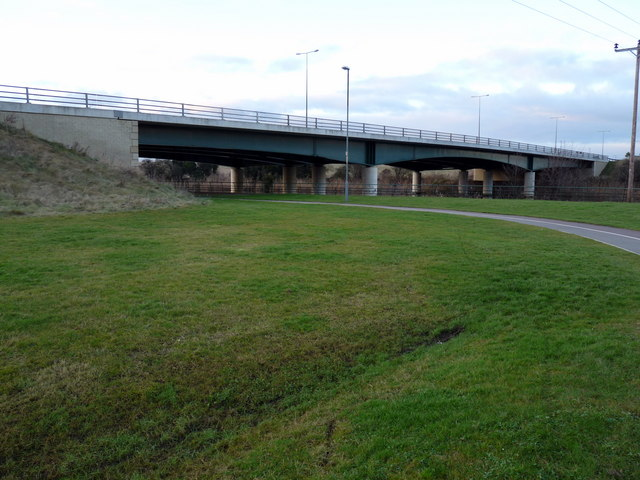
1. Barwick Way
2. Queen Elizabeth Way's Jubilee Bridge

Ingleby is accessible by three roads: Queen Elizabeth Way (north), Ingleby Way (east) and Barwick Way (south). The latter two lead to the A1044 due to the road switching from east–west to north–south in nearby Maltby. Barwick Way leads to the road when it is under as Low Lane while Ingleby Way the road the road is under as Thornaby Road, the latter was formerly designated as the A1045.

Due to its nature as a commuter town Ingleby Barwick has long faced traffic congestion at peak times. Speeding has also been a problem within the main roads in the town. On 15 July 2011, 9-year old Brandon Maggs died after being hit by a speeding car driven by a pizza delivery driver on Roundhill Avenue. This prompted residents to launch a campaign to reduce speeding on the main estate roads which lead to a number of traffic calming measures on main roads throughout the town.

In 2016, due to the housing development of The Rings being built, Myton Way was upgraded to dual carriageway from the Tesco roundabout to Broom Hill, and the Sandgate roundabout was replaced with traffic signals. Ingleby Way was also dualled from the Tesco roundabout to Barwick Way roundabout. The works started on Monday 29 February 2016 and were completed on Thursday 22 December 2016, apart from some footpath work.

Arriva North East operate buses in Ingleby Barwick with regular services, day & evening, to Stockton seven days a week & Middlesbrough and Yarm Monday to Saturday. Teesside International Airport with regular daily services to/from Aberdeen and Amsterdam, is about 8 miles away.

=== Rail ===
The adjacent towns and villages of Yarm, Eaglescliffe and Thornaby each have railway stations approximately four miles away. Connections to the main line service, at Darlington or York, are further connected to these three stations.

=== Paths ===
The route of the original Barwick Lane, which gave access to much of the original farmland remains mainly as a public footpath; parts remain in use as unconnected access roads such as at High Leven. The route goes through Sober Hall, crossing Sober Hall Avenue, Pennine Way and Blair Avenue, passing west of Barley Fields Primary School and the Myton Road shops. The original end of Barwick Lane, leading to Barwick Farm, is north-west in the town (The Rings). The lane has had multiple spurs to other farms predating modern housing.

== Education ==
=== Library ===
The original library was located within All Saints Academy, however in 2020, the library was relocated within the IB Leisure Centre. It is open to the public during specified times, seven days a week. Library facilities include free computer access, CD/DVD hire, photocopying, reference section, a children's and an adult library. The library also plays host during elections to a Polling Station.

=== Schools ===
Ingleby Barwick has eight schools with six primary and two secondary education.

==== Primary ====
Whinstone is in Lowfields and is so named due to Ingleby Barwick formerly having a quarry, now the golf course in The Rings. In December 2017, the school became part of the Vision Academy Learning Trust, now called the Spark Education Trust.

Barley Fields opened in September 2006 and named due to Barwick, as a name, coming from a still operating farm that formally harvest barley in the large parts of the town and was the initial township.

St Francis of Assisi is in Broom Hill. The school is affiliated with the Church of England and therefore St. Francis church and All Saints Academy in the town. The school is a part of the Dales Academy Trust.

St Thérèse is a school affiliated with the Roman Catholic Diocese of Middlesbrough and therefore St. Therese church in the town. The congregation previously used the school hall before the church was built. The school is currently a part of the Nicholas Postgate Catholic Academy Trust.

Myton Park is named after Myton Farm House and is adjacent to All Saints Academy and IB Leisure Centre.

Ingleby Mill is a school named after a mill next to the current site. Barley Fields occupies the former site of Ingleby Mill which is opposite St. Thérèse.

==== Secondary ====
===== All Saints Academy =====
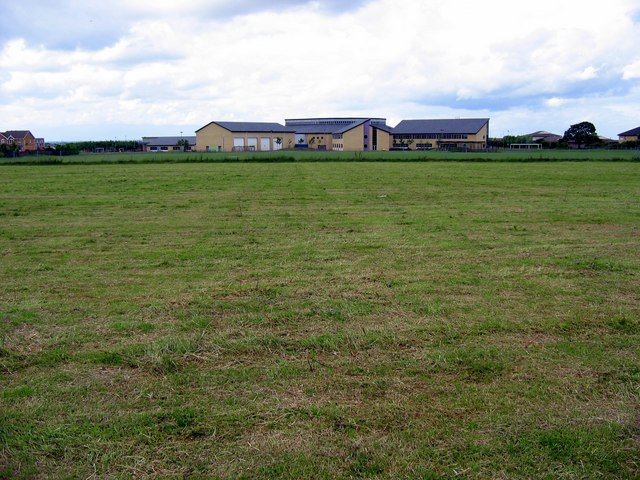
All Saints Academy from behind, to the right of the school is where the Leisure Centre now stands

All Saints Academy, is the oldest secondary school within Ingleby Barwick, located at the centre of the town. The school is affiliated with the Church of England and therefore St. Francis of Assisi church in the town.

The school opened as All Saints Voluntary Aided Church of England Secondary School and initially accommodated 600 pupils. From September 2009 the admission number to year 7 had been increased to 140 pupils.

Previously a voluntary aided school (state funded) and affiliated with the Church of England Diocese of York. The school converted to an academy in May 2013 and was renamed All Saints CofE Academy.

===== Ingleby Manor Free School & Sixth Form =====
Ingleby Manor Free School was the latest secondary school and the first sixth form to be built in Ingleby Barwick. The school is located in the south east of Ingleby Barwick. The admission number to year 7 is 120 pupils. The school is under Delta Academies Trust.

== Religion ==
An Anglican church dedicated to St Francis of Assisi operates services in the town's centre.

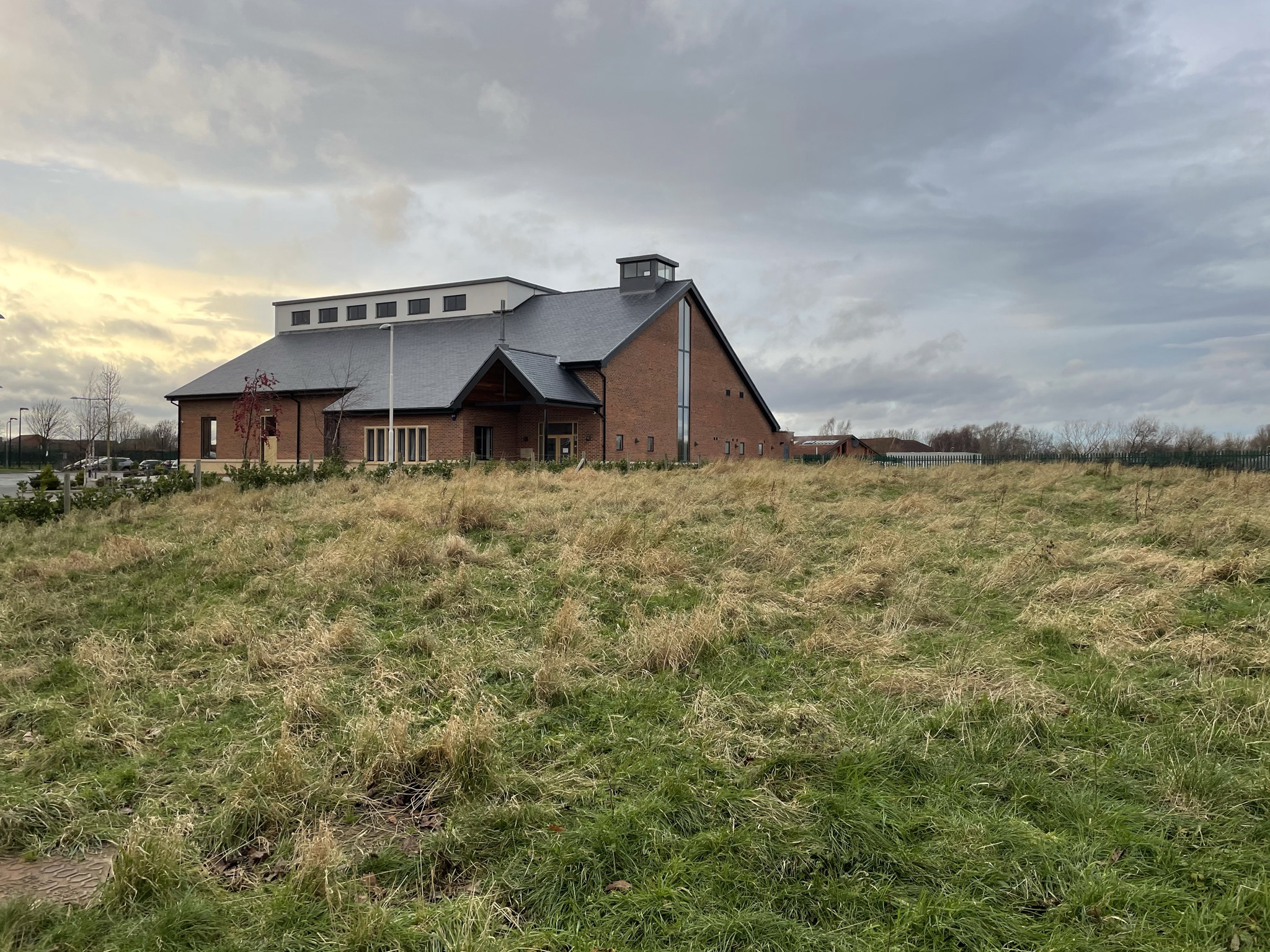
St Therese of Lisieux Parish Church

In November 2007 Stockton on Tees Borough Council approved plans to build St. Therese of Lisieux Catholic parish church next to the primary school of the same name, where services continued to be held until funds could be obtained for the construction of the new church. In August 2014 the Diocese of Middlesbrough announced that it was soon to start building the church. The St Therese of Lisieux church started on 8 June 2015, completion expected "early 2016". Building work was completed in February 2016 and the first mass was celebrated on Saturday 5 March 2016.

== Amenities ==
=== Centre ===
In 1997 the first Bannatyne health club was built in Ingleby Barwick Centre. There is a supermarket in the centre with Tesco being the current operator since 2004, previously being operated by Safeway.

Romano Park is located on land behind Tesco and All Saints Academy. The building of a play area for children under 14 years had started in January 2009 and opened thereafter opened soon after. The park also has a multi-use sport ground. In February 2022 a consultation was held regarding the redevelopment of the park.

Ingleby Barwick has a leisure centre called IB Leisure. This is located next to All Saints Academy and opened in August 2020. It includes a 25-metre swimming pool, gym and library.

=== Other ===
Sandgate Park shopping parade is located in The Rings; the parade includes a convenience shop, DIY shop and food establishments. Ingleby Barwick Community Hall, a green and play park located a short distance away from the parade.

Beckfields contains a number of amenities including a shopping parade, bistro, public house, village green and Ingleby Barwick Community Centre.

Lowfields shopping parade includes a shopping parade, post office, doctors surgery, dentist, public house, primary school and village green.

== Notable current/former residents ==
- Ben Houchen, first and current Tees Valley Mayor, was brought up in Ingleby.
- Juninho Paulista, lived in Ingleby Barwick during his time at Middlesbrough FC.
- Katherine Copeland, a rower who won a gold medal at London 2012 Olympic Games. A gold-painted Royal Mail Postbox honours the medal win, located at the end of Apsley Way in the town's north-west.
- Nathan Thomas (footballer), born in Ingleby Barwick.
- Nathan Wood, born in Ingleby and is a footballer for Southampton FC.

== See also ==
- Middlesbrough
- Barwick-in-Elmet
- Egglescliffe
- Cleveland, Yorkshire
- Manjaros
- Stokesley
