= Melior =

Melior may refer to:

- Melior (cardinal) (died c. 1197), Italian monk
- Susanne Melior (born 1958), a German politician, biologist and Member of the European Parliament

== Schools ==
- Melior Community Academy in Scunthorpe in the North Lincolnshire, England

== Other uses ==
- Melior (typeface), created by Hermann Zapf
- Melior Discovery, a private biopharmaceutical company based in Exton, Pennsylvania, USA
- Melior (coffee maker), a brand name of a French press coffee maker
