= Ingleby Manor Free School =

Location
- Welwyn Road; Stockton-on-Tees, TS17 0FA; England; 54.509124°N 1.303488°W

Information
- Type: Free school
- Established: 1 September 2014; 12 years ago
- Local authority: Stockton-On-Tees
- Trust: Delta Academies Trust
- Department for Education URN: 140949 Tables
- Ofsted: Reports
- Principal: Ray Parkinson
- Gender: Mixed
- Age: 11 to 16
- Enrolment: 462 (January 2018)
- Capacity: 750
- Website: www.inglebymanorschool.org.uk

Ingleby Manor Free School is a mixed secondary school and sixth form with free school status. It is located in Maltby, North Yorkshire, England. It had an enrolment of over 450 pupils, ages 11–16, as of 2024.

The school is operated by Delta Academies Trust, and the current principal is Ray Parkinson.

== History ==
Since the construction of All Saints, a proposal for a second secondary school with a Sixth Form, Ingleby Manor School, was developed by IBIS Councillors and handed over to a group of local residents after the first stage of application proposal to open the school as part of the government's "Free Schools" programme.

The School has caused controversy in the local community due to a planning application for the school being tied in with a development of 350 houses on an area of green wedge land at Little Maltby Farm. On Tuesday 5 February 2013 Stockton Borough Council Planning Committee rejected the joint plans for a free school and 350 houses. Despite this the school appointed their Principal Designate, David Willard, on 4 July 2012. The new Principal, Ray Parkinson took over midway through the schools fourth year

The school was originally proposed to open in September 2013 with permanent buildings ready in September 2014, however this was then put back by 1 year due to the development being refused planning permission. A planning appeal was submitted to the Secretary of State for Communities and Local Government who, on 27 September 2013, overturned the local decision to refuse planning permission for the Free School and 350 houses.

Further controversy was caused in the local community after the Free School developers unveiled plans to build an additional 550 homes around the school, bringing the total number to 900 homes on area designated as green wedge land.

In September 2014 Ingleby Manor School, as a member of the School Partnership Trust Academies, now Delta Academies Trust, opened with the Year 7 group in temporary premises on Teesside Industrial Estate. Ground works for the new school eventually commenced in August 2015 on the "Little Maltby Farm" site on Low Lane. Meanwhile, the school continues to operate in the temporary premises on Teesside Industrial Estate. As at March 2016 the construction of the school buildings is progressing to schedule and a new roundabout on Low Lane to give access to the school and houses nearby is under construction. The school opened in these new premises in September 2016.
