= Christopher Bell (businessman) =

British businessman (born 1957)

- Born: 18 November 1957 (age 68)
- Education: Mexborough Grammar School, Wolverhampton Polytechnic
- Occupation: Businessman

Christopher Bell (born 18 November 1957) is a British businessman who was Chief Executive Officer of Ladbrokes from 2006 until May 2010. He is currently Chairman of OnTheMarket, Team17 and XL Media plc.

He was educated at Mexborough Grammar School and Wolverhampton Polytechnic. He was previously Chairman of Game until March 2012, and is a former chairman of Business in Sport and Leisure.
