= The Laurel Academy =

Location
- Maple Road; Mexborough; South Yorkshire, S64 9SD; England
- 53.5027°N 1.2964°W

Information
- Type: Academy
- Local authority: Doncaster
- Trust: Delta Academies Trust
- Department for Education URN: 146639 Tables
- Ofsted: Reports
- Headteacher: Katy Taylor-Clarke
- Gender: Coeducational
- Age: 11 to 16
- Website: https://www.laurelacademy.org.uk/

The Laurel Academy (formerly Mexborough Academy) is a coeducational secondary school located in Mexborough, South Yorkshire, England.

== History ==
The school was founded in October 1904 as Mexborough and District Secondary School. It became Mexborough Grammar School in 1931.

On 7 March 1968 members of the school's sixth form took part in a 25-minute-long television programme, part of a competitive series entitled Sixth Sense, which was broadcast on BBC One at 18.40. The students investigated and aired their views on the topics of anti-German prejudice, vivisection, and Christmas cards, and their contributions were judged by Sir Jack Longland, Sir Christopher Chataway and Mary Holland. Ten years earlier, a team from Mexborough Grammar had taken part in the Granada Television youth discussion programme We Want an Answer.

Mexborough Grammar School merged with Mexborough County Secondary School, a secondary modern school, in 1975 and became a comprehensive school. It was known as Mexborough School, and for a period in the early 2000s as Mexborough School Specialist Science College.

Previously a community school administered by Doncaster Metropolitan Borough Council, Mexborough School converted to academy status in January 2015 and was renamed Mexborough Academy. It continues to coordinate with Doncaster Metropolitan Borough Council for admissions. The school was sponsored by the Wakefield City Academies Trust (WCAT). In 2016, the school introduced a new logo, which dropped the long-standing Latin motto of Abeunt Studia in Mores (Studies Pass into Character). Low numbers led to the school's sixth form closing in summer 2017, though it legally remains an 11–18 institution.

WCAT announced its intention to disband and give up all its schools, including Mexborough Academy, in September 2017. After a lengthy delay due to the school's Private Finance Initiative contract, the school was transferred to Delta Academies Trust on 1 November 2018. On 1 December 2018, Delta renamed the school The Laurel Academy.

== Notable former pupils ==
=== Mexborough Grammar School ===
- Christopher Bell, CEO of Ladbrokes
- Tony Capstick, comedian and broadcaster
- Ted Hughes, poet and Poet Laureate from 1984–98
- Prof Jane Humphries, Professor of Economic History since 2004 at the University of Oxford (All Souls College, Oxford), and President from 2010-13 of the Economic History Society
- Air Vice-Marshal Alan Johnson FRAeS, Commander from 1984-86 of the RAF Princess Alexandra Hospital at RAF Wroughton
- Harold Massingham, poet
- Chris Moore (illustrator), works in science fiction, and created many 1970s album covers
- Angela Morley, award-winning composer, arranger, and conductor
- Brian O'Malley, Labour MP from 1963-76 for Rotherham
- Alan Sunderland, footballer with Arsenal
- Peter James Thomas, entrepreneur
- John Wall CMG, Ambassador to Paraguay from 1957–59, Author of Weird Fiction Books under his pseudonym Sarban "The Sound of His Horn" - probably the first alternate history novel, Ringstones and other Stories, The Dollmaker Source Time A Falkener, Author Mark Valentine, The South Yorkshire Times, Don And Dearne Magazine

== Former teachers ==
- Peter Hardy, Baron Hardy of Wath, Labour MP from 1983-97 for Wentworth (taught English)
- Dame Julia Higgins FRS, Professor of Polymer Science from 1989-2007 at Imperial College London, and President from 2002-03 of the Institution of Chemical Engineers (taught Physics from 1966–68)
