= Scalby School =

Community comprehensive school in Scarborough, North Yorkshire, England

Location
- Fieldstead Crescent; Newby; Scarborough, North Yorkshire, YO12 6TH; England
- 54.294°N 0.435°W

Information
- Type: Academy
- Established: 1942
- Local authority: North Yorkshire
- Trust: Delta Academies Trust
- Department for Education URN: 143288 Tables
- Ofsted: Reports
- Headteacher: Chris Robertson
- Gender: Coeducational
- Age: 11 to 16
- Enrolment: 982 (2024)
- Colours: Petrol Blue and Yellow
- Website: https://www.scalby.coastandvale.academy/

Scalby School is a coeducational secondary school located in Scarborough, North Yorkshire, England. It caters for pupils aged 11–16, with around 980 on roll.

== History ==
The school was built in 1942. In September 2002 the Department for Education and Skills (DfES) awarded the school specialist school status as a Technology College.

In January 2009 the school started to be advised by the Outwood Grange College group of schools. A number of measures were introduced soon afterwards. In August 2009, the school achieved record results at GCSE, with some 61% achieving 5A*-C (including English and mathematics), the chief measure for English school league tables. This was a climb of 28% in one year, and placed the school top along the North Yorkshire coastal strip for raw results. In the same year there was a similar 5A*-C improvement, with the results reaching 85%. Over the summer a number of rooms have been refurbished, and two extra ICT suites created. A banner celebrating the results of the 2009 Year 11 Leavers was hung on the front of the building, made up of student photographs taken at the school Prom. In the 2009 League Tables, published in January 2010, it was confirmed the school was top in Scarborough for the benchmark 5A*-C including English & mathematics. The school also climbed to 9th in North Yorkshire out of 42 secondary schools for Level 2 CVA, a measure of the progress made by all students.

In 2010 there was an increase in school performance, with 68% of students achieving at least 5 A*-C grades including English and maths, and 99% of students achieving at least 5 A*-C grades. This placed the school as the top performing in Scarborough for the second year running. 49% of pupils achieved at least 3 A* or A grades, a rise of 20%. The school exceeded the FFTD target, a threshold for the top 25% of schools, by 10% overall, and by 8% in English and maths. The CVA score placed the school 18th in England.

On 5 July 2010 the school released a digital download Somewhere Over The Rainbow/Wonderful World, in an attempt to reach the charts. The song is a tribute to a young student of the school who raised over £25,000 with her friends, whilst battling against a brain tumour.

In January 2011 Scalby was named the top school in Yorkshire, and 18th in England in the 2010 School League Tables using the CVA measure (Contextual value added).

Previously a community school administered by North Yorkshire County Council, in September 2016 Scalby School converted to academy status. The school was then sponsored by the Scalby Learning Trust, later renamed the Coast and Vale Learning Trust.

The school received a positive Ofsted inspection report in 2019 and was rated 'Good' overall.

In 2025, the Coast and Vale Learning Trust merged into the Delta Academies Trust, bringing Scalby School under the Delta banner.

== Tracking student progress ==
The school uses a reporting process known as "ATL" previously "Praising Stars" where a summary is given to pupils at the end of each half-term, as a form of report to parents. Grades are prefixed with the letter "E", standing for "Effort". These range from E1 (Outstanding) to E4 (Inadequate). The system also reports to parents whether the student is likely to reach Fischer Family Trust Band D "FFT D" targets, a common measure of progress in English schools. It is commonplace for individual year groups to have assemblies which recognize and commend students that have performed well throughout the term achieving E1s and E2s.

In many cases individual teachers also use the ATL system as a way of marking pieces of classwork.

== Behaviour measures ==
The school uses a system of escalating "Consequences" as a framework for discipline, beginning with C1 and ranging through to C6 (exclusion).

Upon reaching a C4, a pupil is removed from the classroom and given an after-school detention. If the pupil chooses not attend the detention, then they are given a C5, which means isolation for one school day, in the "Consequences Room". A C6 is given if the student misbehaves in that room, resulting in a fixed term of exclusion from the school.

== Pastoral care ==
In the summer of 2009 the school restructured how tutor groups were constructed, altering the way provision of pastoral care was organised. This involved a move away from the traditional horizontal (same age) structure of forms to a more progressive vertical one. The former structure saw each student belonging to a form group of around 30 pupils from their own year-group, with a teacher acting as a tutor. The new structure maintains a teacher acting each year as a tutor to the group, but the group is mixed-age with students from all years included. They are known as 'Vertical Mentor Groups' ("VMGs"). Each group therefore evolves annually, as older students leave and are replaced by new Year 7 student entering the school.

Each VMG is given the name of a country, and the countries are arranged in four continents. The continents are in different parts of the school: Africa, Asia, Americas, Australasia.

Vertical structuring has been implemented in other secondary schools, the main advantages being seen as the mixing of ages leading to an increased sense of community, allowing for pupils to share experiences, foster understanding and reduce bullying. The system also complements the school curriculum, where in many cases, students in Years 9 and 10 and 11 are in the same subject mixed-age option groups.

== Somewhere Over The Rainbow / Wonderful World ==
This is about the charity song. For additional topics see Over the Rainbow (disambiguation) and Wonderful World (disambiguation)

"Somewhere Over The Rainbow/Wonderful World"

Single by Scalby School Staff & Students
- Released: 5 July 2010
- Recorded: January – April 2010; Scalby School, Scarborough
- Venue: Scalby School
- Genre: Gospel, Pop
- Length: 4:58
- Label: Unsigned
- Songwriters: J. Morgan, Mr Tarn
- Producers: J. Morgan, J. Marshall

Music video
- "Somewhere Over The Rainbow / Wonderful World" on YouTube

"Somewhere Over The Rainbow/Wonderful World" is a charity and tribute song recorded by Staff and Students from Scalby School in Scarborough, North Yorkshire. It is based on adaptations of well-known classics "Over The Rainbow" and "What a Wonderful World". The song was recorded and released as an online-digital download in tribute of the late Ellie-Othick Bowmaker, who died of a Brain tumor, and to raise money for Ellie's Fund, a charity set up after her death. The song peaked in the top twenty on Amazon UK.

=== Music video ===
A video was released along with the song on to YouTube. It features pictures of Ellie, her fundraising work, and also of the people singing in the video. As of January 2012, the video has almost 100,000 views, with many comments.

=== Release history ===
Region	Date	Format
Worldwide	5 July 2010	Digital download (iTunes & Amazon)
		Local / National Radio (UK)
		CD single (local-release only)

== Notable alumni ==
- Zoe Aldcroft - International rugby union captain of England
- Ben James-Ellis - stage actor
- Joel Ross - BBC Radio 1 presenter
- Simon Slater - actor
- Paul Tonkinson - comedian and former presenter of The Big Breakfast
- David Sillito - BBC Media & Arts Correspondent
