= Listed buildings in Hunton, North Yorkshire =

Hunton is a civil parish in the county of North Yorkshire, England. It contains 13 listed buildings that are recorded in the National Heritage List for England. All the listed buildings are designated at Grade II, the lowest of the three grades, which is applied to "buildings of national importance and special interest" The parish contains the village of Hunton and the surrounding area. All the listed buildings are in the village, and consist of houses, cottages and associated structures, a farmhouse and farm buildings.

== Buildings ==
| Name and location | Photograph | Date | Notes |
|---|---|---|---|
| Manor House Farmhouse; 54.32828°N 1.71013°W | | Late 16th to early 17th century | A farmhouse that has been extended, it is in stone with a tile roof, coped gables and shaped kneelers. There are two storeys, and a T-shaped plan, consisting of a cross-wing on the left, the earliest part, a four-bay hall range to the right, and a rear wing. The cross-wing has quoins, and it contains mullioned windows. On the hall range is a projecting two-storey gabled porch containing a mullioned window, and on the right return is a doorway with a chamfered quoined surround. The windows in the range are casements. |
| Old Hall and Old Hall Cottage; 54.32566°N 1.71463°W | | Late 16th to early 17th century | The house, which has been extended, and the recessed 19th-century cottage to the right, are in stone. The house has two storeys and an attic, and consists of a gabled cross-wing on the left, and a two-bay hall range to the right. The house has a tile roof with shaped kneelers and stone gable coping. The cross-wing has a boulder plinth and quoins, and in the house is a doorway, and a blocked doorway with a chamfered and quoined surround. Both parts contain sash windows in the ground floor, and mullioned and transomed windows above. The cottage has two storeys and three bays, and contains a round-arched carriageway with voussoirs. The windows are sashes. |
| Low Hall; 54.32476°N 1.70969°W | — | Mid to late 17th century | A farmhouse that was extended in the 18th century, in pebbledashed stone, with two storeys, the earlier part forming a cross-wing on the right. The cross-wing has a plinth, quoins, and a tile roof with quarter-round kneelers and stone gable coping. Most of the windows are mullioned, and there is a casement window and a horizontally-sliding sash. The later range has quoins, a doorway with a chamfered quoined surround, and a triangular head. The roof is in stone slate, with a shaped kneeler and stone coping on the right. The windows are a mix of casements and sashes. |
| Barn east of Low Hall; 54.32470°N 1.70943°W | | Mid to late 17th century | The barn is in stone, with quoins, and a pantile roof with stone copings and shaped kneelers. There are two storeys and four internal bays. The barn contains stable doors with flat brick arches, and vents. |
| Spring House; 54.32903°N 1.70808°W | — | Early 18th century | The house is in sandstone on a boulder plinth, with quoins, and an artificial stone slate roof with stone coping and shaped kneelers. There are two storeys and an attic, three bays, and a single-storey extension to the right. In the centre is a doorway with a chamfered quoined rusticated surround. The windows on the front are casements, and in the left return is a mullioned window and two fixed lights above. |
| Granary east of Low Hall; 54.32475°N 1.70928°W | — | Early to mid 18th century | The granary is in stone, with quoins on the left, and a pantile roof with stone copings and shaped kneelers to the left gable. There are two storeys and three internal bays. In the centre, steps lead up to a doorway, and the granary contains a blocked doorway in the ground floor, and a window. |
| Thornfield House; 54.32919°N 1.70847°W | | Early to mid 18th century | The house is in sandstone, with quoins, and a stone slate roof with stone coping and shaped kneelers on the left. There are two storeys and two bays. In the centre is a doorway with a chamfered quoined surround, and the windows are sashes with chamfered surrounds. |
| Knight; 54.32667°N 1.71277°W | — | 1763 | The house is in sandstone with quoins and a stone slate roof. There are two storeys and three bays, the right bay recessed and lower. In the centre of the main block is a doorway, above which is a chamfered projecting initialled and dated plaque. The windows are sashes, and in the right bay is a garage door. |
| Hunton House, wall and railings 54.32918°N 1.70830°W | | Mid to late 18th century | A pair of houses in sandstone, with a tile roof, stone copings and shaped kneelers. There are three storeys, five bays, and a rear left range. In the centre is a doorway with a gabled porch, and the windows are sashes, those in the top floor horizontally-sliding. At the rear is a round-arched stair window with voussoirs. Enclosing the front garden is a curving retaining wall with stone coping, and railings in wrought iron with cast iron finials, containing a doorway. |
| Rowan House; 54.32680°N 1.71203°W | — | Late 18th century (probable) | The house is in sandstone, with quoins, and a stone slate roof with shaped kneelers and stone coping. There are two storeys and three bays. In the centre is a doorway with a fanlight, to the right is a round-arched doorway converted into a window with a keystone, and the other windows are sashes, some with keystones. |
| Sundial Cottage; 54.32599°N 1.71105°W | — | Late 18th century | The house is in sandstone on a plinth, with quoins and a stone slate roof. There are two storeys and two bays. In the centre is a doorway, above which is a small sundial, and the windows are sashes. |
| The Old Dame School; 54.32681°N 1.71184°W | — | Early 19th century | A house and a former shop, later combined, in sandstone. There are two storeys, a main block with two bays, and a lower single-bay recessed on the right. The main block has quoins, a cellar, and a stone slate roof with stone coping and shaped kneelers. The right bay has quoins, and a pantile roof with stone slates at the eaves. To the left is a porch containing a doorway with an open pediment. The windows in both parts are casements, and at the rear is a round-arched stair window. |
| Railings, South View; 54.32670°N 1.71175°W | — | Early 19th century | The railings enclosing the gardens to the south and east of Rowan House and The Old Dame School are in wrought iron, on a low stone wall with slab coping. At intervals there are stone bollards with ogee caps. |
