= Manor Croft Academy =

Location
- Old Bank Road; Earlsheaton; Dewsbury, West Yorkshire, WF127DW; England; 53°41′38″N 1°36′56″W

Information
- Type: Academy
- Motto: ...Changing Lives
- Established: 2013 (As Manor Croft Academy) 1955 (As Earlsheaton Secondary Modern)
- Local authority: Kirklees Council
- Trust: Delta Academies Trust
- Department for Education URN: 139076 Tables
- Ofsted: Reports
- Chair of Education Advisory Board (Governors): Kath Turner
- Principal: Kion Nikoumaram
- Staff: 63
- Gender: Coeducational
- Age: 11 to 16
- Enrolment: 630
- Capacity: 900
- Colours: Black & Blue
- Ofsted Rating: Good (2017)
- Progress 8 Score: +0.67 (2019)
- Website: manorcroft.org.uk

Manor Croft Academy is a smaller than average coeducational secondary school with academy status, located in the town of Dewsbury, West Yorkshire, England.

The school opened in 1955 as Earlsheaton Secondary Modern. In 2003 the school gained specialist Technology College status, and was renamed Earlsheaton Technology College. The school converted to academy status in September 2013, became part of the Delta Academies Trust and was renamed Manor Croft Academy.

The school mainly draws its pupils from within a 10-mile radius in which there are areas of significant social and economic deprivation. Most pupils start school with lower than average levels of attainment, and a higher than average proportion of students are supported by the Pupil Premium. The number of pupils with learning difficulties and/or disabilities is below average.

In 2018 the school became the most improved school in Kirklees and one of the most improved in the country with a 133% increase in the schools Progress 8 Score VS 2017. The school is currently ranked (2019) as one of the top 10 best schools in Kirklees and is the best in Dewsbury in terms of progress 8, attainment 8 and grade 5 or above in English and Maths GCSEs.

== Ofsted Inspections ==
In 2017 the school was rated good with outstanding leadership by Ofsted. Ofsted commented that; “Achievement across the school has improved significantly over the last year as a result of good teaching." "As a result of improved leadership and teaching, GCSE outcomes in English, mathematics, science and geography have improved." Ofsted also commended the leadership of the school stating; “Outstanding leadership at all levels is at the heart of this school’s recent success." “The headteacher is very ably supported by an extremely strong team of senior leaders."

Principal Andy Barnett said: ‘We are delighted with the outcome of the inspection. It has been a year of transformational change and this is external recognition of all the hard work that goes on day in day out to support our students.”

In January 2016 a Section 8 Monitoring Inspection was carried out by Ofsted and found the school had made "significant improvements" since the Section 5 Ofsted Inspection in 2015.

The School's first ever Section 5 Ofsted Inspection was conducted in 2015 where the school was judged to "require improvement".

== Performance ==
Manor Croft Academy ranks (2019) as the best school in Dewsbury and is in the top 10 of the best schools in Kirklees in terms of progress 8, attainment 8 and grade 5 or above in English and Maths GCSEs.

In 2018, A 133% increase in the schools Progress 8 Score saw the school become the most improved school in Kirklees and one of the most improved in the country in 2018 vs 2017.

=== Progress 8 Score ===
This score shows how much progress pupils at Manor Croft Academy made between the end of key stage 2 and the end of key stage 4, compared to pupils across England who got similar results at the end of key stage 2. This is based on results in up to 8 qualifications, which include English, maths, 3 English Baccalaureate qualifications including sciences, computer science, history, geography and languages, and 3 other additional approved qualifications.

A score above zero means pupils made more progress, on average, than pupils across England who got similar results at the end of key stage 2.

A score below zero means pupils made less progress, on average, than pupils across England who got similar results at the end of key stage 2.

A negative progress score does not mean pupils made no progress, or the school has failed, rather it means pupils in the school made less progress than other pupils across England with similar results at the end of key stage 2.

- 2019 +0.67 (Well Above Average - Achieved by about 15% of schools in England)
- 2018 +0.77 (Well Above Average - Achieved by about 15% of schools in England)
- 2017 +0.33 (Above Average - Achieved by about 18% of schools in England)
- 2016 -0.22 (Below Average - Achieved by about 20% of schools in England)

Current (2019) Rankings

Dewsbury: 1st out of 7 schools Kirklees: 2nd out of 50 schools

=== Attainment 8 Score ===
Schools get a score based on how well pupils have performed in up to 8 qualifications, which include English, maths, 3 English Baccalaureate qualifications including sciences, computer science, history, geography and languages, and 3 other additional approved qualifications.

- 2019 - School 51.9 Points - Local Authority Average 45.1 Points - England Average 46.6 Points
- 2018 - School 52.2 Points - Local Authority Average 45.4 Points - England Average 46.5 Points
- 2017 - School 48.3 Points - Local Authority Average 45 Points - England Average 44.2 Points
- 2016 - School 46 Points - Local Authority Average 48.9 Points - England Average 48.5 Points

Current (2019) Rankings

Dewsbury: 1st out of 7 schools Kirklees: 4th out of 50 schools

=== Grade 5 or above in English & maths GCSEs ===
This tells you the percentage of pupils who achieved grade 5 or above in the reformed English and maths GCSEs. Reformed GCSEs are graded 1 (low) to 9 (high). Grade 5 in the new grading is a similar level of achievement to a high grade C or low grade B in the old grading.

- 2019 - School 52.9% - Local Authority Average 42.4% - England Average 43%
- 2018 - School 64% - Local Authority Average 42.5% - England Average 43.3%
- 2017 - School 49%

Current (2019) Rankings

Dewsbury: 1st out of 7 schools Kirklees: 6th out of 50 schools
