= Yewlands Academy =

Academy in Sheffield, South Yorkshire, England

Location
- Creswick Lane; Sheffield, South Yorkshire, S35 8NN; England
- Coordinates: 53°25′35″N 1°29′14″W

Information
- Type: Academy
- Local authority: Sheffield
- Trust: Brigantia Learning Trust
- Department for Education URN: 145943 Tables
- Ofsted: Reports
- Chair: Mike Vickers
- Head teacher: Kimberly Willmot
- Gender: Mixed
- Age: 11 to 16
- Enrolment: 873 as of January 2017
- Capacity: 900
- Uniform: Black blazer with logo (y11 no logo), white shirt, black trousers, black shoes, tie (y11 have a different tie)
- Website: Yewlands Academy

Yewlands Academy (formerly known as Yewlands Secondary School and Yewlands Technology College) is a secondary school with academy status located in the Grenoside area of Sheffield, South Yorkshire, England. Until March 2018, it was managed by the Wakefield City Academies Trust. Following the collapse of the trust, it was taken over by the Brigantia Learning Trust who manage the nearby schools Hinde House School and Longley Park Sixth Form.

The school was originally located on three sites; Elm, Yew and Willow. The school was rebuilt as part of the Building Schools for the Future programme and reopened in September 2009. The school has under 900 students.

== Notable former pupils ==
- Olympic Long Jumper Sheila Sherwood (née Parkin) who won Silver at the Mexico Games in 1968, and a Commonwealth Gold two years later.
