= Phil Bull =

Professional gambler, racehorse owner and publisher (1910–1989)

Phil Bull (9 April 1910 – 11 June 1989), born in West Yorkshire, England, was a professional gambler, racehorse owner and publisher, who founded the Timeform private handicapping system for British horseracing. Since 1948, Timeform has produced performance ratings for every racehorse in Great Britain and, increasingly, internationally. Timeform ratings have become adopted as the British horseracing industry's unofficial, but authoritative, measure of racehorse performance. It was said of Bull in 1976 that "there is no more familiar figure on English racecourses than the stocky, bearded one of Mr Phil Bull". Many racing aphorisms can be attributed to Bull, such as: "at the racecourse, keep your eyes open and your ears closed".

== Early life ==
Phil Bull was born in Hemsworth, West Yorkshire, the son of a miner and a schoolteacher, and was educated at the local Grammar School. In 1931, he graduated from Leeds University with a degree in mathematics. This mathematical grounding, as well as his interest in horse racing, led him to develop his own technique for time‑based evaluation of racehorse performance, from which the Timeform handicapping system developed. Although his first career after leaving university was as a teacher in London, he quickly gave it up to become a professional gambler.

== Career ==
=== Gambler ===
Bull had started betting as a schoolboy and could recall a winning bet on Caerlon at 25/1 in the 1931 Derby. By the 1940s, Bull was betting in earnest using his self‑devised time ratings, which he also sold under the pseudonym of the Temple Time Test, becoming in the process a well‑known figure on British racecourses. His circle of friends included other significant betting and racing figures of the day, including bookmaker William Hill and celebrities from beyond the world of racing such as Bud Flanagan and the Crazy Gang.

His own betting records show that between 1943 and 1974 his cumulative profit from betting was £295,987 (nearly £5 million in 1995 prices), although other sources put this figure at over £500,000.

=== Timeform ===
Following the end of the Second World War, Phil Bull teamed up with Dick Whitford, who, like Bull, had developed his own handicapping ratings system. The enterprise was christened Timeform because while Bull's ratings methodology focused on the probable speed at which a race would be run, Whitford's approach was more form‑driven. A publishing company called Portway Press was set up, and the first Timeform publication was issued in 1948. This was Racehorses of 1948 and became the first of Timeform's famous Racehorses of ... series. The company would later become famous for its daily racecards, which are still available on racecourses. Bull headed the company until his death.

Timeform is now owned by the online betting exchange Betfair. Today, Timeform ratings are unofficially used to determine the best horses of all time. As of the end of the 2012 flat racing season, the top‑rated all‑time Timeform horses are Frankel on the flat, Night Nurse over hurdles, and Arkle over chase fences.

=== Owner and breeder ===
In 1947, Bull founded the Hollins Stud in Halifax, West Yorkshire, using four mares – Lady Electra, Candida, Orienne, and Anne of Essex. At the stud, he bred Romulus, winner of the Greenham Stakes, Sussex Stakes, Queen Elizabeth II Stakes, and Prix du Moulin, as well as Eudaemon, winner of the Gimcrack Stakes and Champagne Stakes. Among the horses that won in Bull's own colours of cerise with a white circle were Sostenuto, winner of the Ebor Handicap, and Charicles, winner of the Wokingham Handicap. His stud declined through the 1970s, and by the 1980s he rarely owned more than one horse at a time.

=== Racing administration ===
Bull was known for his strident views on the organisation of racing. With reluctance, he took up the chairmanship of the Horseracing Advisory Council in March 1980. He lasted only four months in the role, however, as his autocratic style was said not to be suited to a committee environment.

One of his lasting legacies to racing is the creation of one of the showcase end‑of‑season races. Bull was adamant for a long time that the British flat racing programme lacked a mile race for two‑year‑olds, and at his behest the Timeform Gold Cup was established in 1961 to fill this gap. The race, currently known as the Vertem Futurity Trophy, is now a Group 1 race, and in recent years has been won by future Derby winners including High Chaparral, Authorized, and Camelot.

== Bibliography ==
- Mortimer, Roger; Onslow, Richard; Willett, Peter (1978). Biographical Encyclopaedia of British Racing. London: Macdonald and Jane's. ISBN 0-354-08536-0.
- Nevison, Dave (2008). A Bloody Good Winner. Newbury, Berkshire: Highdown. ISBN 978-1-905156-45-0.
- Wright, Howard (1995). Bull - The Biography. Halifax: Timeform. ISBN 0-900599-76-6.
- Wright, Howard (1986). The Encyclopaedia of Flat Racing. London: Robert Hale. ISBN 0-7090-2639-0.
