= Hull Trinity House Academy =

- Hull Trinity House Academy

Location
- Beverley Road; Kingston upon Hull, East Riding of Yorkshire, HU3 1UP; England; 53.755765°N 0.346649°W

Information
- Type: Academy
- Motto: Spes Super Sydera
- Established: 2 February 1787; 239 years ago
- Local authority: Hull City Council
- Trust: Delta Academies Trust
- Department for Education URN: 138082 Tables
- Ofsted: Reports
- Principal: Daniel Flack
- Gender: Coeducational
- Age: 11 to 16
- Houses: Harrison, Hammond, Johnson, and Morley
- Website: http://www.hthacademy.org.uk/

Hull Trinity House Academy is a co-educational secondary school in Kingston upon Hull, East Riding of Yorkshire, England.

== History ==
The school was established on 2 February 1787 as Hull Trinity House Marine School. Originally a private school, Hull Trinity House later became a state-funded technical school and was renamed Hull Trinity House Engineering School. The school was renamed Hull Trinity House School when it became a comprehensive.

In April 2014, Hull Trinity House School was taken over by Delta Academies Trust, converting to academy status and being renamed Hull Trinity House Academy.

In March 2021, plans were drawn up for the school to relocate from its site in Charlotte Street Mews to the former Endeavour Academy site on Beverley Road. Work to transform the site began in August 2022 with a completion ahead of the move for the start of the academic year in September 2023.

Initially a boys only school, in September 2022 it admitted female students for the first time.

In September 2023, the school was relocated to its new location on Beverley Road, along with possession of the Steve Prescott Sports Centre on Temple Street.
