= Manjaros =

UK restaurant chain

- Industry: Restaurants
- Headquarters: Middlesbrough, North Yorkshire, England
- Number of locations: 15 Restaurants & 3 Express Takeaways (2024)
- Area served: England
- Products: African, Caribbean and English cuisine
- Website: http://manjaros.co.uk/

Manjaros is a restaurant chain operating primarily in Northern England, known for its mix of African, Caribbean, and English cuisine.

== History ==
The first Manjaros was opened in Middlesbrough in 2013. By January 2018, further branches had opened in Leeds, Manchester and Birmingham. In March, came a Newcastle branch with Bradford, Glasgow, Huddersfield and Preston also added by end of that year. The 10th restaurant opened in Ilford in February 2019.

During the English coronavirus lockdown in 2020, Manjaro’s Darlington restaurant opened with a delivery service until lockdown eased when it could open its table service. Post lockdown it took over a bistro, as a third addition to its Tees Valley restaurants and twelfth overall, in Ingleby Barwick. The 13th restaurant opened in Billingham in March 2023.

== Cuisine ==
The chain specialises in African–Caribbean fusion cuisine; its website indicates that its food is halal.

Having originated on Teesside the chain has gained a significant reputation for its parmo, a local dish. Most restaurants also feature a gelato lounge. Manjaros' dishes are prepared to showcase the spices that are commonly used in Africa and the Caribbean islands. The chain's signature sauce, "Manjaros Sauce", is made from natural ingredients and comes in a variety of spicy flavors.

== Incidents ==
- On 24 December 2017, a supplier was stabbed and killed in the kitchen of the Middlesbrough restaurant by a member of staff. In court, it was determined that the deceased had previously reacted violently when his produce was refused on quality grounds; the staff member was acquitted of the charges of murder, manslaughter and two knife offences.
- A mouse was released in the Middlesbrough restaurant, which was voluntarily closed until Food Standard Agency inspectors confirmed there were no issues.
