= It's a Wonderful World =

It's a Wonderful World may refer to:

- It's a Wonderful World (1939 film), a comedy starring Claudette Colbert and James Stewart
- It's a Wonderful World (1956 film), a British musical film
- It's a Wonderful World (album), an album by Mr. Children
- "It's a Wonderful World" (Elvis Presley song)
- The World Ends with You, a 2007 action role-playing game released in Japan as It's a Wonderful World
- "It's a Wonderful World" the final episode of the anime JoJo's Bizarre Adventure: Stone Ocean

== See also ==
- Wonderful World (disambiguation), includes uses of What a Wonderful World
- It's a Wonderful Life (disambiguation)
