= High Leven =

Village in North Yorkshire, England

Coordinates: 54.505°N 1.307°W

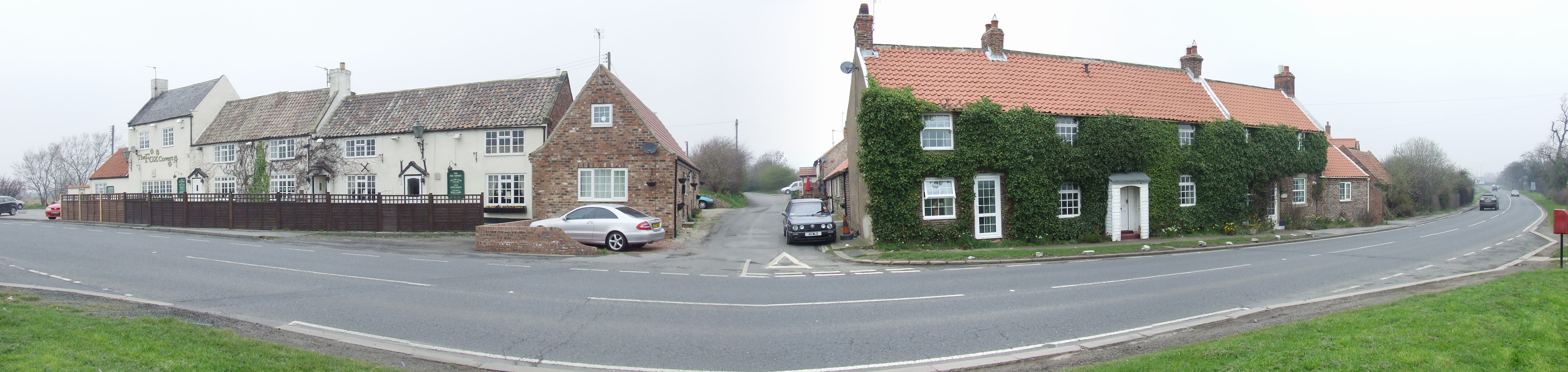
Low Lane looking to Barwick Lane, High Leven

High Leven is a village of Ingleby Barwick in North Yorkshire, England. It is in the borough of Stockton-on-Tees, on top of the River Leven's dell. It has a public house called The Fox Covert (previously Half Moon Inn) and a co-operative food store, open every day 05:00 to 24:00, with an ATM and petrol station.

== Administration ==
Administratively, this village is in the borough of Stockton-on-Tees, made a unitary authority in 1996, before which High Leven was in the county of Cleveland, a creation of the Local Government Act 1972 which abolished the Stokesley Rural District in the North Riding of Yorkshire.

High Leven, which is part of the Ingleby Barwick South ward has three local councilors sitting on Stockton borough council all of whom are members of Ingleby Barwick Independent Society.

== Geography ==
The village is located to the east of Yarm at the top of Leven Bank.

== See also ==
- Low Leven - neighbouring hamlet at the bottom of Leven Bank
