= River Leven, North Yorkshire =

River in North Yorkshire, England

River Leven
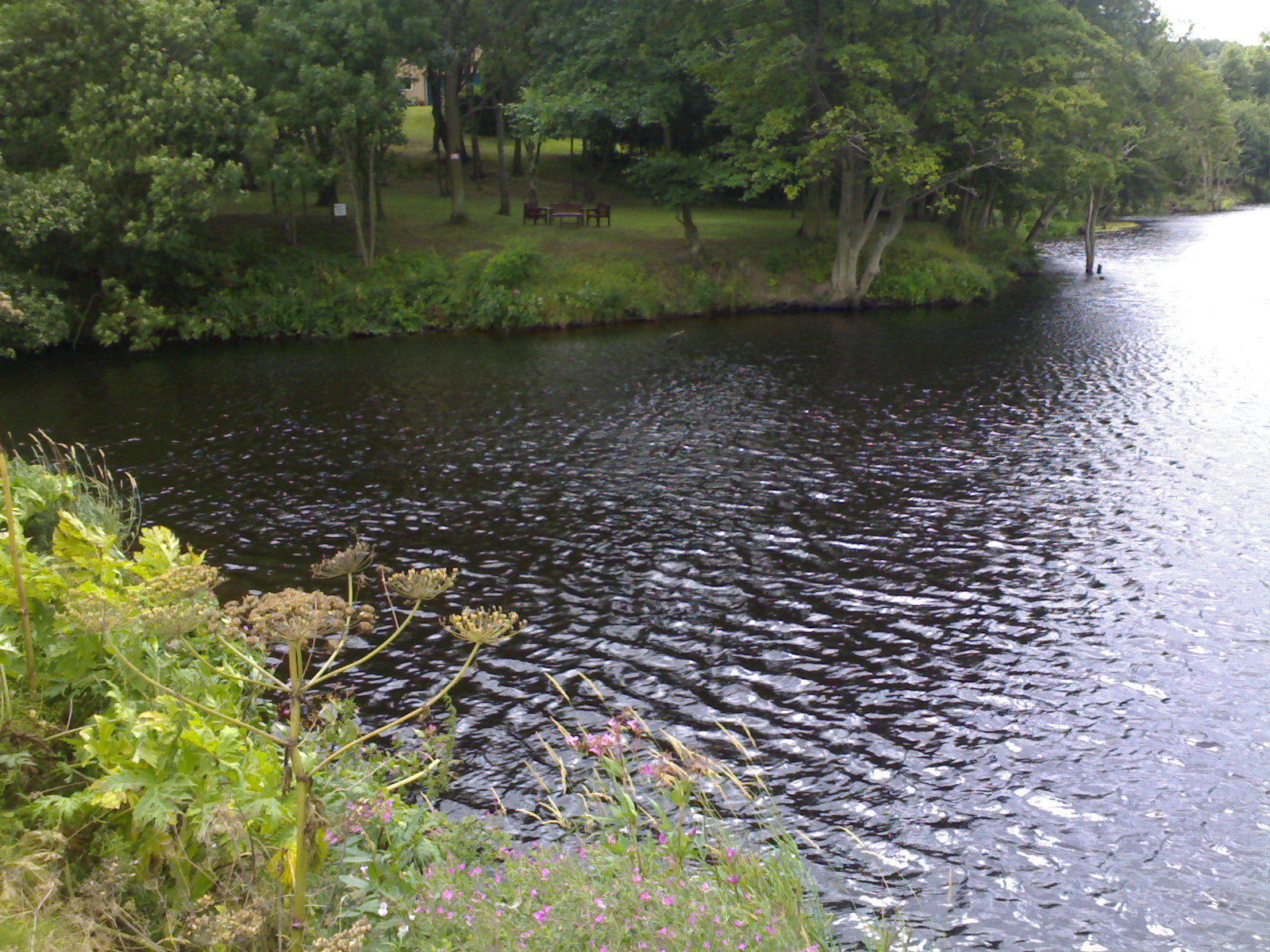
- The mouth of the Leven.

Location
- Country: England

Physical characteristics
- Source
  - location: Kildale Moor, North Yorkshire
  - coordinates: 54°27′50″N 1°2′47″W
  - elevation: 279 metres (915 ft)
- Mouth
  - location: River Tees at Yarm
  - coordinates: 54°30′31″N 1°20′12″W
  - elevation: 16 metres (52 ft)
- Length: 46.2 km (28.7 mi)
- Basin size: 196.3 km^{2} (75.8 sq mi)

The River Leven (pronounced /ˈliːvən/) in North Yorkshire, England is a tributary of the River Tees. It rises on Warren Moor, part of Kildale Moor, in the North York Moors and flows to the north of the moors to join the River Tees at Yarm.

== Course ==
The source of the river is on Warren Moor, part of Kildale Moor, just south of the village of Kildale. The river flows east until it reaches the Whitby to Middlesbrough railway line where it turns around to flow west to Kildale. It then flows south-south-west through woodland to its confluence with Dundale Beck where it turns north-west through Low Easby and Little Ayton, before turning west and then south-west at Great Ayton. It runs parallel to the A173 to Stokesley. The river becomes increasingly meandering as it continues south-west past Skutterskelfe to Hutton Rudby and Rudby, where it turns north-west and then west again over the Slape Stones waterfall. At Crathorne it turns north and then north-east as far as Middleton-on-Leven before passing under the A19 in a north-west direction. The final couple of miles are north and north-west between Ingleby Barwick and Yarm, before the river joins the River Tees.

=== Water levels ===
Monitoring station	Station elevation	Low water level	High water level	Record high level
Easby	101.3 m (332 ft)	0.11 m (0.36 ft)	0.4 m (1.3 ft)	1.25 m (4.1 ft)
Great Ayton	83 m (272 ft)	0.03 m (0.098 ft)	0.5 m (1.6 ft)	1.64 m (5.4 ft)
Stokesley	67 m (220 ft)	0.09 m (0.30 ft)	0.8 m (2.6 ft)	1.62 m (5.3 ft)
Foxton Bridge	56 m (184 ft)	0.21 m (0.69 ft)	1.5 m (4.9 ft)	2.63 m (8.6 ft)

- Low and High Water Levels are an average figure.

In October 2022, a new flood defence project was opened on the river above Stokesley. When river levels are high, a new flood channel diverts the excess water around the town, meeting the Leven again further downstream. The Environment Agency funded the project at a cost of £3.7 million.

== Geology ==
The river drains from the Cleveland Hills across a mixed geology of mostly Permian and Jurassic age bedrock of low permeability. Most of the deposits on top of the bedrock are boulder clay. There is mixed agriculture, with some moorland and forestry near the source.

== Natural history ==
Since a weir on the lower river was built during the Industrial Revolution, migratory and territorial fish and mammals had been missing from the river. In 2007, the Environment Agency built a fish bypass at the weir. In 2011, they announced the return of spawning salmon for the first time in 150 years.

In 2020, it was confirmed that crayfish plague had infected the river after 40 dead white-clawed crayfish were found along a 700-metre (2,300 ft) stretch of river.

== History ==
In Stokesley, the river is crossed by Taylorson's Bridge, a 17th-century packhorse bridge, which was once the only crossing in the town. The Domesday Book records a water mill on the banks of the river in the town. In Hutton Rudby, a plaque on a bridge marks the site of a water mill that, amongst several uses, once made sailcloth.

== Lists ==
=== Tributaries ===
- Lonsdale Beck
- Dundale Beck
- Otter Hills Beck
- Main Stell
- Ings Beck
- Eller Beck
- West Beck
- River Tame
- Grange Beck
- Alum Beck
- Carr Stell
- Coul Beck
- Hundale Gill
- Magpie Gill
- Fanny Bell's Gill
- East Gill

=== Settlements ===
- Kildale
- Low Easby
- Little Ayton
- Great Ayton
- Stokesley
- Skutterskelfe
- Rudby
- Hutton Rudby
- Crathorne
- Middleton-on-Leven
- Low Leven
- High Leven
- Ingleby Barwick
- Levendale (Yarm)

=== Crossings ===
- Petlar's Bridge, near Kildale
- Unnamed road, near Kildale
- Whitby to Middlesbrough Railway Line
- Unnamed road north of Kildale
- Whitby to Middlesbrough Railway Line
- Unnamed road north of Easby
- Cross Lane, Little Ayton
- Holmes bridge, Little Ayton (foot)
- Holly Garth, Great Ayton
- A173, Levenside, Great Ayton
- A172, Stokesley
- B1257, Stokesley Bridge
- Manor Close/Levenside, Stokesley (ford)
- Malvern Drive, Stokesley
- B1365, Bense Bridge, Stokesley
- Hutton Bridge, Hutton Rudby
- Crathorne Mill Bridge, Crathorne
- Foxton bridge near Middleton-on-Leven
- A19 near Middleton-on-Leven
- A1044, Leven Bridge, Low Leven

== Gallery ==
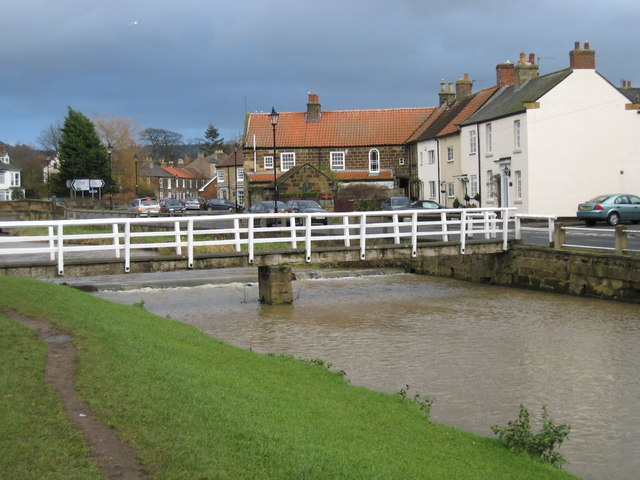
Bridge over the Leven at Great Ayton

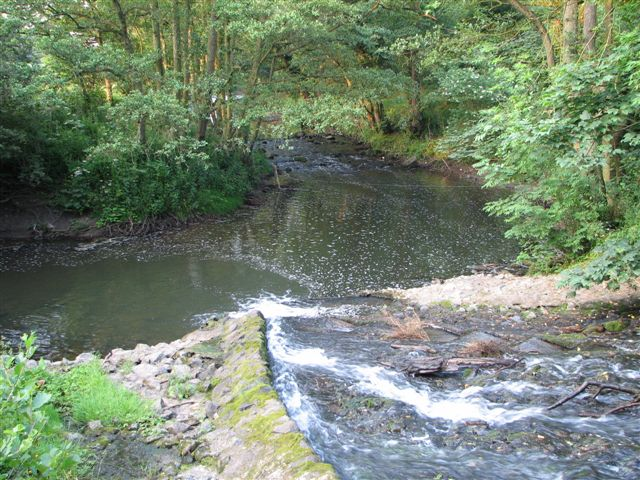
Coul Beck joining the River Leven near Rudby

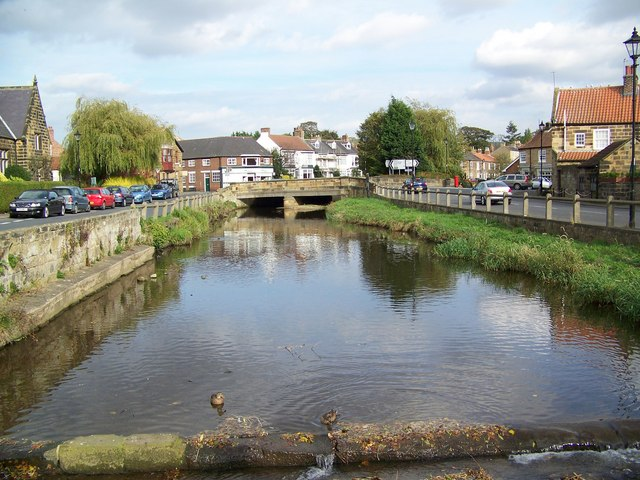
River Leven, Great Ayton

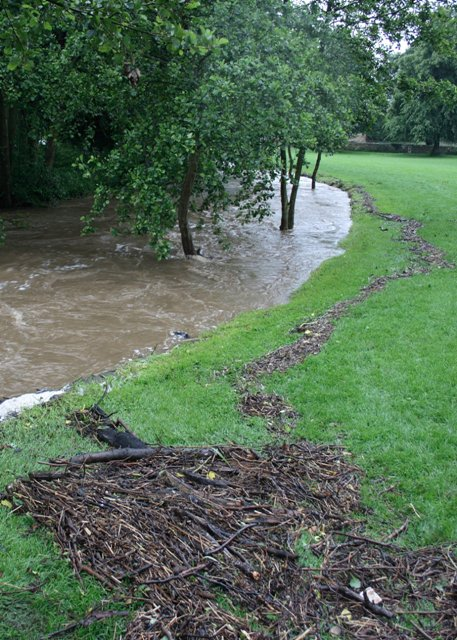
River Leven, Low Green, Great Ayton

== Sources ==
- Ordnance Survey Open Viewer https://www.ordnancesurvey.co.uk/business-government/tools-support/open-data-support
- Google Earth
- National Environment Research Council - Centre for Ecology and Hydrology
- Environment Agency
