= Outwood Academy Hemsworth =

Location
- Wakefield Road; Hemsworth; City of Wakefield, West Yorkshire, WF9 4AB; England
- Coordinates: 53.6154°N 1.3522°W

Information
- Type: Academy
- Motto: Students first
- Established: 1921; 105 years ago
- Local authority: Wakefield
- Department for Education URN: 145938 Tables
- Ofsted: Reports
- Principal: Toby Rutter
- Gender: Mixed
- Age: 11 to 18
- Enrolment: 1,358 as of November 2015
- Publication: Insight Magazine
- Website: hemsworth.outwood.com

Outwood Academy Hemsworth, known previously as Hemsworth Arts and Community Academy and Hemsworth Arts and Community College, is a co-educational secondary school and sixth form located in Hemsworth in the City of Wakefield, West Yorkshire, England.

The school is operated by Outwood Grange Academies Trust, and the principal is Toby Rutter.

== History ==
The school was opened in 1921, set up by the West Riding County Council's Education Committee and was known as Hemsworth Grammar School. (It is not to be confused with Archbishop Holgate's grammar school, founded in Hemsworth in 1546, which moved to Barnsley in 1888.) It was renamed Hemsworth High School when the school became comprehensive. In 2001, the school gained specialist status as an Arts College and was renamed Hemsworth Arts and Community College. The school converted to academy status in August 2014 and was renamed Hemsworth Arts and Community Academy. It was sponsored by the Wakefield City Academies Trust, a multi-academy trust.

Hemsworth Arts and Community Academy offers GCSEs and BTECs as programmes of study for pupils, while students in the sixth form have the option to study from a range of A-levels and further BTECs. The school also offers adult education courses to the local community.

On 1 May 2018, the school became part of Outwood Grange Academies Trust, reopening as Outwood Academy Hemsworth.

== Notable former pupils ==
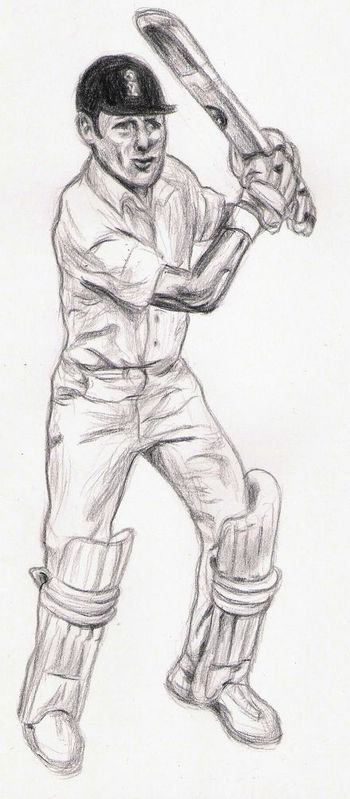
Geoff Boycott

=== Hemsworth High School ===
- David Wainwright, cricketer
- Scott Askham, MMA fighter

=== Hemsworth Grammar School ===
- Derek Birley, educationalist and writer, Vice-Chancellor from 1984 to 1981 of the University of Ulster
- Geoffrey Boycott, legendary Yorkshire and England cricketer (batsman)
- Phil Bull, gambler and publisher, who founded Timeform in Halifax
- Jeffrey Ennis, Labour MP from 1997 to 2010 for Barnsley East and Mexborough
- Leonard Parkin, journalist at ITN in the 1970s and 1980s on the News at Ten and 5.45 News
- Peter Toon, priest and theologian
