= Listed buildings in Sandhutton =

Sandhutton is a civil parish in the county of North Yorkshire, England. It contains five listed buildings that are recorded in the National Heritage List for England. All the listed buildings are designated at Grade II, the lowest of the three grades, which is applied to "buildings of national importance and special interest". The parish contains the village of Sandhutton and the surrounding area. The listed buildings are all in the centre of the village, and consist of three houses, a cottage and a former Methodist chapel.

== Buildings ==
Name and location	Photograph	Date	Notes
Winns Cottage; 54.23285°N 1.41319°W	—	Early 17th century	The cottage has a timber framed core, and there is exposed timber framing at the rear. The rest is in red brick with a pantile roof. There are two storeys and two bays, and additions at the rear. On the front is a doorway and sash windows.
The Hollies; 54.23207°N 1.41538°W	—	Mid-18th century	The house is in rendered brick, with a stepped and dentilled eaves band, and a pantile roof with two courses of stone slate at the eaves, and brick coping. There are two courses and an attic, three bays, and a later incorporated rear cottage. In the centre is a gabled porch, and the inner doorway has a reeded architrave with corner paterae and a cornice. The windows are sashes, and in the attic is a horizontally sliding sash window.
Harker House; 54.23240°N 1.41279°W	—	Late 18th century	The house is in red brick with a pantile roof and two storeys. The gable end faces the street and has one bay, and the side elevation has two bays. On the centre of the side is a doorway in an architrave, and the windows are sashes. The gable end has a band forming a pediment with stone coping, on the ground floor is a canted bay window with a consoled frieze and a cornice, and the upper floor contains a tripartite sash window.
Methodist Chapel; 54.23215°N 1.41444°W		1815	The former chapel is in red brick with stone dressings, and has a hipped Welsh slate roof. The gabled front has two storeys and three bays, a floor band, and paired gutter brackets. In the centre is a full height recessed round arch containing a doorway approached by steps with railings. The doorway has rusticated Doric pilasters, a radial fanlight, a reeded archivolt and a keystone, and above it is a large inscribed and dated panel. The windows are round-headed sashes.
Glenroyd; 54.23271°N 1.41441°W	—	Early to mid-19th century	The house is in red brick with a pantile roof, two storeys and three bays. The central doorway has engaged Doric columns, a frieze and a cornice. It is flanked by canted bay windows with pilasters, friezes and cornices. On the upper floor are sash windows with flat brick arches.
