= Low Leven =

Hamlet in North Yorkshire, England

Coordinates: 54.503°N 1.314°W

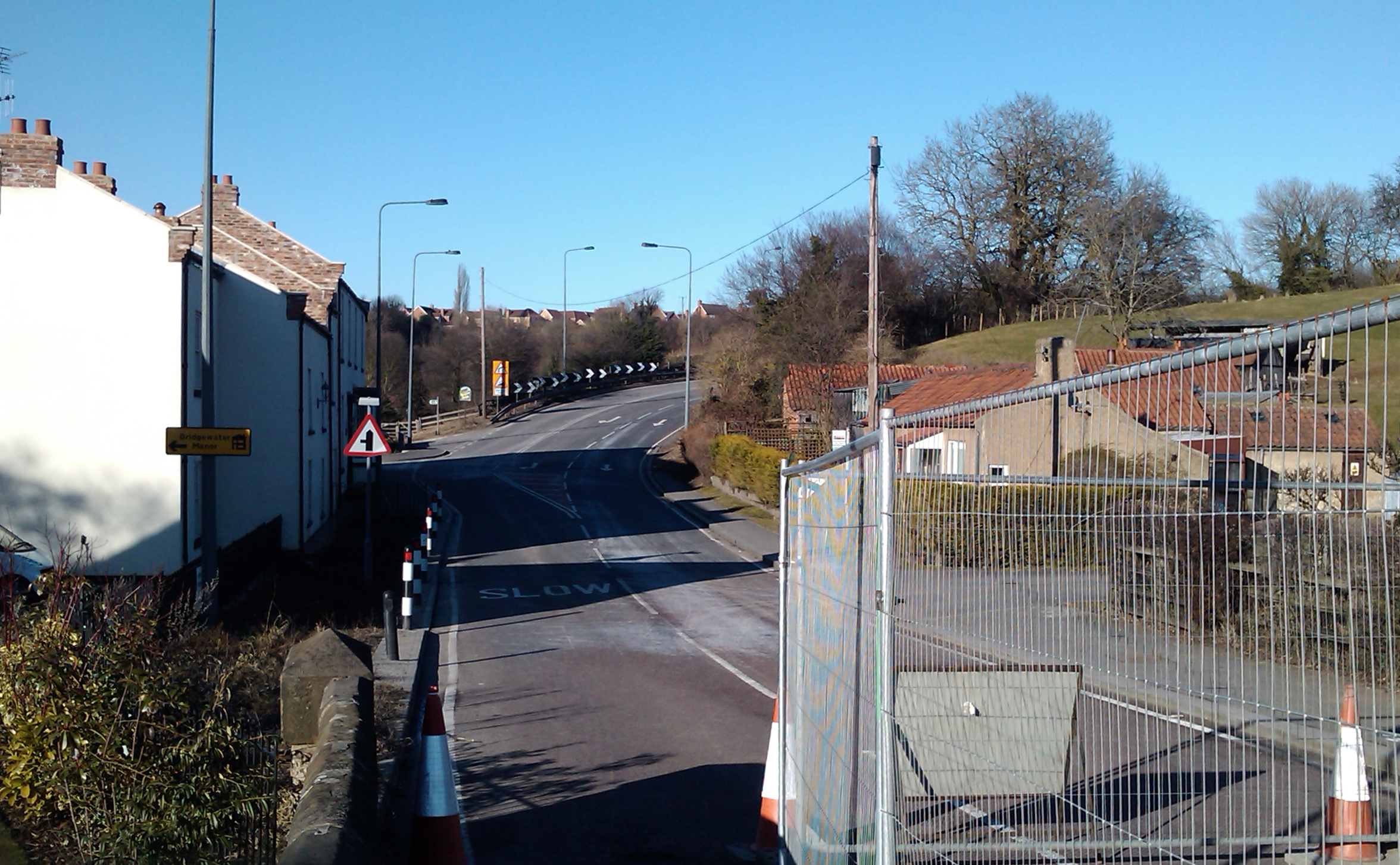
Closed bridge at Low Leven – 7 March 2010

Low Leven is a hamlet of Ingleby Barwick in North Yorkshire, England. It is in the borough of Stockton-on-Tees, in the River Leven's dell on the east bank before the river flows into the River Tees.

Until 2007, Low Leven was dominated by the ruin of the Cross Keys public house and three former dwellings which were abandoned due to persistent flooding. Large parts of these buildings had collapsed. This area has now been restored and redeveloped in to an area of large family dwellings.

== Regeneration ==
Low Leven in January 2009

In mid-February 2007 work was started on the reconstruction of the ruins of the hamlet, and construction of nine 5/6 bedroom houses by Yorvik Homes. Work on the development - called Bridgewater Manor - continued through the summer of 2007 with the demolition of Mill House. Leven House, The Cross Keys, and Mill Cottage were retained and now form a single property called Pool House. As of January 2009, six of the properties were completed as well as the renovation of Pool House. Development of the remaining three properties stalled until late 2010 when they were finally completed.

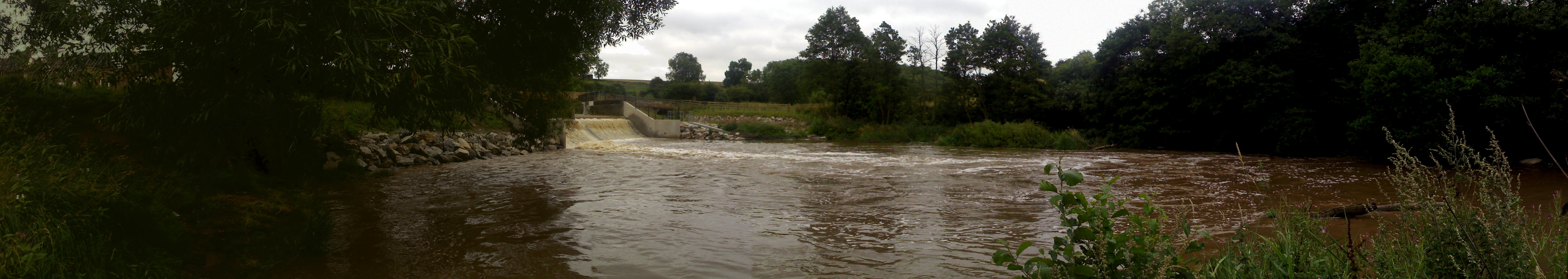
The weir at Low Leven

The new development has been built on an area that the Environment Agency describes in their 2005 national flood risk assessment as having a greater than 1 in 75 risk of flooding.

== Leven Bridge ==
In March 2010 large cracks appeared in the ancient bridge over the River Leven. As a result, the bridge was closed for many months while work was completed to repair the foundations that has washed away. The bridge reopened in July 2010.

== Leven Bridge Mill and Leven Camp ==
On the northern edge of Low Leven was a water mill. This has since been converted into a dwelling house, but still shows evidence of its previous use. The river was diverted through a channel to flow through the mill, but this has since been filled in. To the rear of the mill is Leven Camp. This was originally a Hutment, with numerous primitive chalets that were used as holiday homes in the 1900s. Under the ownership of Mr Boal, from 1961, some caravans were added to the site, and a brick toilet block constructed. The site suffered decline in the late 1900s, and in 2001 the last tenant moved out of what was a disused and overgrown site. By 2011, the area was overgrown with bushes and trees, and only remnants of the old huts remained. On 26 March 2012 diggers moved in to clear the site of all undergrowth, dead and dying trees, along with all materials on leveled sections.

== See also ==
- High Leven - Neighbouring village at the top of Leven Bank.
- Yarm - Neighbouring town at the top of Leven Bank.
