= Scarborough University Technical College =

Location
- 1, Ashburn Road; Scarborough, North Yorkshire, YO11 2JW; England; 54°16′23″N 0°24′54″W

Information
- Type: University Technical College
- Motto: Supportive United Tolerant Community
- Established: 2016
- Local authority: North Yorkshire
- Trust: Delta Academies Trust
- Department for Education URN: 142884 Tables
- Ofsted: Reports
- Principal: Helen Dowds
- Staff: >40
- Gender: Mixed
- Age: 13 to 18
- Enrolment: 270
- Capacity: 600
- Website: http://www.scarboroughutc.co.uk/

Scarborough University Technical College is a mixed University Technical College located in Scarborough, North Yorkshire, England. It opened in 2016 and caters for students aged 13–18 years. It is located on Weaponness Coach Park, in a purpose-built building.

The lead education partner for the UTC is the University of Hull, and it is also supported by businesses such as McCain, Unison Ltd, Alpamare, Castle, Deep Sea Electronics, Firmac, Flamingo Land, GCHQ, Plaxton (ADL), Schneider Electric Ltd, Severfield, SWC Trade Frames and Anglo American, as well as North Yorkshire Council.

In 2025, the Coast and Vale Learning Trust, of which Scarborough UTC was part, merged into the Delta Academies Trust, bringing it under the Delta banner.
