= Breckenbrough School =

Upper school in North Yorkshire, England

Location
- Breckenbrough Hall; Sandhutton, Thirsk, North Yorkshire, YO7 4EN; England; 54.24337°N 1.41115°W

Information
- Type: Private day and boarding
- Motto: "More Than a School"
- Established: 1934
- Founder: Arthur Fitch
- Department for Education URN: 121765 Tables
- Ofsted: Reports
- Headmaster: Simon Bannister
- Gender: Male
- Age: 9 to 19
- Website: http://www.breckenbrough.org.uk/

Breckenbrough School is a private registered charitable trust school in Sandhutton, North Yorkshire, England.

Breckenbrough School was founded in 1934 by Arthur Fitch, a Quaker psychiatrist, at Dunnow Hall, Slaidburn. It moved to Ledston Hall near Castleford in 1948, and has been at Breckenbrough Hall, Sandhutton, since 1958. It is one of seven Quaker schools in England.

A 2013 Ofsted social care inspection report judged the school to be overall Grade 2 (good), and a report in 2021 stated that the school "requires improvement".

== Therapeutic provision ==
The school employs a full-time psychologist who works directly with pupils and parents. She also supports teachers, learning support stuff and social education. This is important for developing strategies and plans for pupils. She is also available to support pupils in their transition away from the school ('After Care').

== See also ==
- List of Friends schools
