= Delta Academies Trust =

Multi-academy trust

- Formation: 23 September 2010; 16 years ago
- Type: Multi-academy trust
- Purpose: Education
- Location: Spawd Bone Lane, Knottingley, WF11 0EP
- Key people: Andy Barnett, CEO
- Website: deltatrust.org.uk
- Formerly called: Schools Partnership Trust Academies

Delta Academies Trust (formerly Schools Partnership Trust Academies) is a multi-academy trust, operating 57 schools. As an academy trust, it is an exempt charity regulated by the Department for Education.

Its current CEO is Andy Barnett.

A critical report from Ofsted in early 2016 prompted reforms at Schools Partnership Trust Academies. A new CEO—Paul Tarn, formerly deputy CEO of Outwood Grange Academies Trust (OGAT)—was appointed; he was joined by a Maths and English Director who transferred to Delta shortly after the CEO took up post. It went on to rebrand as "Delta Academies Trust" as of October 2016.

== Schools ==
=== All through ===
- Serlby Park Academy, Doncaster

Delta operated the former Dawes Lane Academy, a 3–19 free school in Scunthorpe, before its closure in 2015. The school had only opened a year previously, but encountered difficulties with pupil numbers and securing a permanent site.

=== Alternative provision ===
- The Elland Academy, Leeds
- St Wilfrid's Academy, Doncaster

The Grove Academy, Harrogate was a part of the trust until being transferred to Wellspring Academy Trust in 2020.

=== Primary ===
- Craven Primary Academy, Kingston upon Hull
- Crookesbroom Primary Academy, Doncaster
- East Garforth Primary Academy, Leeds
- Eastborough Academy, Dewsbury
- England Lane Academy, Wakefield
- Estcourt Primary Academy, Kingston upon Hull
- Goldthorpe Primary Academy, Barnsley
- Grange Lane Infant Academy, Doncaster
- Green Lane Primary Academy, Leeds
- Greengates Primary Academy, Bradford
- Hatfield Woodhouse Primary School, Doncaster
- Heckmondwike Primary Academy, Heckmondwike
- Highfields Primary Academy, Doncaster
- Kingston Park Academy, Worksop
- Lower Fields Primary Academy, Bradford
- Macaulay Primary Academy, Grimsby
- Mersey Primary Academy, Kingston upon Hull
- Montagu Academy, Doncaster
- Morley Place Academy, Doncaster
- Norbridge Academy, Worksop
- Park View Primary Academy, Leeds
- Pheasant Bank Academy, Doncaster
- Rowena Academy, Doncaster
- Ryecroft Primary Academy, Bradford
- Serlby Park Academy, Doncaster
- Simpson's Lane Academy, Wakefield
- Southmere Primary Academy, Bradford
- Strand Primary Academy, Grimsby
- The Parks Primary Academy, Kingston upon Hull
- The Vale Primary Academy, Wakefield
- Weelsby Academy, Grimsby
- Whetley Academy, Bradford
- Willoughby Road Primary Academy, Scunthorpe
- Willow Green Academy, Wakefield
- Willows Academy, Grimsby
- Worlaby Academy, Brigg
- Wybers Wood Academy, Grimsby

=== Secondary ===
- Ash Hill Academy, Doncaster
- Carlton le Willows Academy, Nottingham
- Darton Academy, Darton
- De Lacy Academy, Wakefield
- De Warenne Academy, Doncaster
- Don Valley Academy, Doncaster
- Garforth Academy, Leeds
- Goole Academy, Goole
- Hanson Academy, Bradford
- Hull Trinity House Academy, Kingston upon Hull
- Ingleby Manor Free School, Maltby
- John Whitgift Academy, Grimsby
- Lincoln Castle Academy, Lincoln
- Manor Croft Academy, Dewsbury
- Melior Community Academy, Scunthorpe
- Rossington All Saints Academy, Doncaster
- The Laurel Academy, Doncaster
- The Vale Academy, Brigg

Doncaster Collegiate Sixth Form, Doncaster was part of the trust until its closure in August 2020.

=== Former Coast and Vale Learning Trust ===
In 2025, the Coast and Vale Learning Trust merged into the Delta Academies Trust, bringing six schools under the Delta banner.

==== Primary ====
- Friarage Community Primary, Scarborough
- Newby and Scalby Primary, Scarborough

==== Secondary ====
- Filey School, Filey
- Lady Lumley's School, Pickering
- Scalby School, Scarborough
- Scarborough UTC, Scarborough
