= Sandhutton =

Village and civil parish in North Yorkshire, England

Coordinates: 54.23271°N 1.41494°W

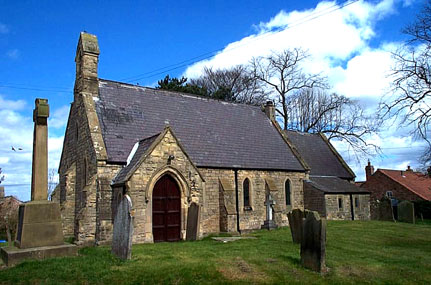
- St Leonard's Church with Sandhutton's War Memorial on the left

- Location within North Yorkshire
- Population: 261 (2011 census)
- OS grid reference: SE382820
- Civil parish: Sandhutton
- Unitary authority: North Yorkshire
- Ceremonial county: North Yorkshire
- Region: Yorkshire and the Humber
- Country: England
- Sovereign state: United Kingdom
- Post town: THIRSK
- Postcode district: YO7
- Police: North Yorkshire
- Fire: North Yorkshire
- Ambulance: Yorkshire
- Website: www.parish-council.com/sandhutton/

Sandhutton is a small village and civil parish in North Yorkshire, England. It lies about 3 miles (5 km) west of Thirsk on the A167. It has been referred to as Hutton, Hutton (Sand), and Sand Hutton. The name derives from Old English sand-hōh-tūn which translates as a sharply projecting piece of sandy ground with an enclosure, farmstead or village upon it.

From 1974 to 2023 it was part of the Hambleton District. It is now administered by the unitary North Yorkshire Council.

East of the village, on the road to Carlton Miniott, is the Sand Hutton Cross, which is now a listed monument. The cross marked the point at which three parishes met and is designated due to the fact that it has survived despite intensive arable farming in the area.

In 2017, a 45-acre (18 ha) solar farm was installed to the east of the village. The scheme involved the placing of 20,000 photovoltaic panels that would generate up to 5 MW and would have a life expectancy of 25 years.

Sandhutton is the location of Breckenbrough School, an independent special school.

== Transport ==
The village lies on the A167 road which has a junction with the A61 road just south of the village at Busby Stoop. The Leeds and Thirsk Railway had a station called Topcliffe which was situated just south of the crossroads at Busby Stoop, however, this closed in 1959 and the nearest railway station is Thirsk, which is just over 2 miles (3 km) away.

== See also ==
- Listed buildings in Sandhutton
