= Hunton, North Yorkshire =

Village and civil parish in North Yorkshire, England

Coordinates: 54.3275°N 1.7155°W

Hunton
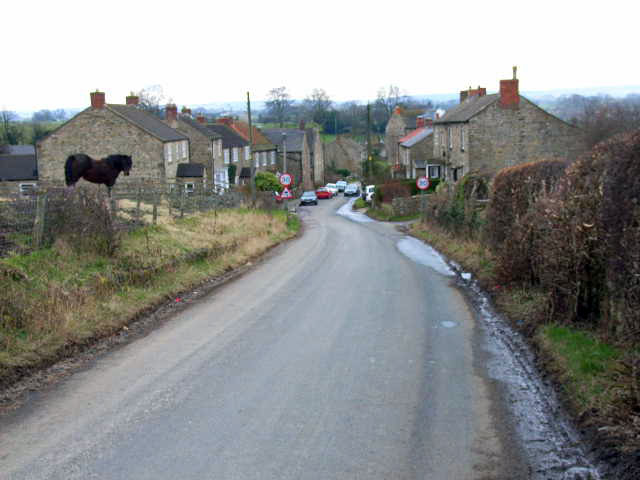
- Top end of Hunton village

- Location within North Yorkshire
- Population: 414
- OS grid reference: SE1892
- Civil parish: Hunton
- Unitary authority: North Yorkshire
- Ceremonial county: North Yorkshire
- Region: Yorkshire and the Humber
- Country: England
- Sovereign state: United Kingdom
- Post town: BEDALE
- Postcode district: DL8
- Dialling code: 01677
- Police: North Yorkshire
- Fire: North Yorkshire
- Ambulance: Yorkshire
- UK Parliament: Richmond and Northallerton

Hunton is a village and civil parish about 3 miles (4.8 km) south of Catterick Garrison and 6 miles (10 km) north west of Bedale, in North Yorkshire, England. At the 2001 census had a population of 420, decreasing to 414 at the 2011 census. The name of the village derives from Old English and means the town of the huntsmen, or where the hunts hounds were kept.

The small village's local amenities include a combined post office/village shop and The Countryman's Inn, a pub, and restaurant. The village also has a primary school, the Hunton and Arrathorne Community Primary School, which has an Ofsted rating of good.

In 1985 the landlord of the pub started a small traction steam engine gala in the village. It has since become a yearly event and has outgrown the original showground in the village. The Hunton Steam Gathering is now a popular annual event.

There used to be a church in the village (St John's), which was rebuilt in 1794, but it is now a private dwelling. To the north of Hunton is the site of a medieval village that is believed to have been left ruinous either because of raids by Scots or because of the Black Death.

From 1974 to 2023 it was part of the district of Richmondshire, it is now administered by the unitary North Yorkshire Council.

== See also ==
- Listed buildings in Hunton, North Yorkshire
