= Filey School =

- School logo

Location
- Muston Road; Filey, North Yorkshire, YO14 0HG; England
- Coordinates: 54.20474°N 0.30294°W

Information
- Type: Academy
- Local authority: North Yorkshire
- Trust: Delta Academies Trust
- Department for Education URN: 149205 Tables
- Ofsted: Reports
- Interim Headteacher: Hayley Pegg
- Gender: Coeducational
- Age: 11 to 16
- Website: https://www.filey.coastandvale.academy/

Filey School (named Ebor Academy Filey for a time) is a secondary school located in Filey, North Yorkshire, England. It is the only secondary school in Filey, and it also covers surrounding villages, with a significant intake from Hunmanby. The school is under the Enhanced Mainstream School (EMS) umbrella created by North Yorkshire County Council, which means the school is specialised in Special Educational Needs students.

== History ==
A 2010 Ofsted report for the school gave a Grade 3 (satisfactory) rating, stating that "This is a satisfactory school. Some areas of its work are good."

The school, until March 2013, had a swimming pool that was open to the residents of Filey, until a shortfall in funding, and inaccurate financial information preventing rescue funding, forced it to close. This was amid claims that North Yorkshire County Council was underfunding the school, a claim it denied.

Another Ofsted inspection in 2013 reduced the school's rating to Grade 4 (inadequate) – the lowest possible grade – citing "achievement of pupils" and "quality of teaching" as inadequate, and "behaviour and safety of pupils" and "leadership and management" as requiring improvement, saying overall that "this is a school that has serious weaknesses".

In September 2014, Filey School fell into special measures, being rated Grade 4 (inadequate) in all four categories.

In July 2015 a whistleblower leaked a report about the serious failings of Filey School. The whistleblower states "The school would be better closed because the level of education the students' are getting at the moment is almost nonexistent", said the anonymous source.

The school converted to academy status in September 2015 and was renamed Ebor Academy Filey. However, due to continued poor performance the school became part of the Coast and Vale Learning Trust in 2022, and adopted its previous name of Filey School.

In 2025, the Coast and Vale Learning Trust merged into the Delta Academies Trust, bringing Filey School under the Delta banner.

== Subjects taught ==
The following Key Stage 4 subjects are taught at the school:

Subject	Qualification
Art	GCSE
Arts Award	Vocational Level 1/2
ASDAN	Vocational Level 1/2
Business Studies	BTEC Level 2
Child Care	Vocational Level 2
Creative & Media	Diploma Level 2
Drama	GCSE
Electronics	GCSE
Engineering	Diploma Level 1 and Vocational Level 1/2
English	GCSE
Fashion & Textiles	GCSE
Food Technology	GCSE
French	GCSE
Geography	GCSE
History	GCSE
ICT	OCR National Level 2
Land Based Science	GCSE
Mathematics	GCSE
Media Studies	BTEC Level 2
Performing Arts	BTEC Level 2
Physical Education	GCSE
Religious Education	GCSE/GCSE Short Course
Resistant Materials	GCSE
Science	GCSE
Social, Health & Development	Diploma Level 2

== Notable former pupils ==
- Andy Crawford, footballer, most notably with Derby County F.C. and Blackburn Rovers F.C.
- Toby Jepson – founding member of, and vocalist in, hard rock band Little Angels
