= Maltby, North Yorkshire =

Village and civil parish in North Yorkshire, England

Coordinates: 54.513°N 1.281°W

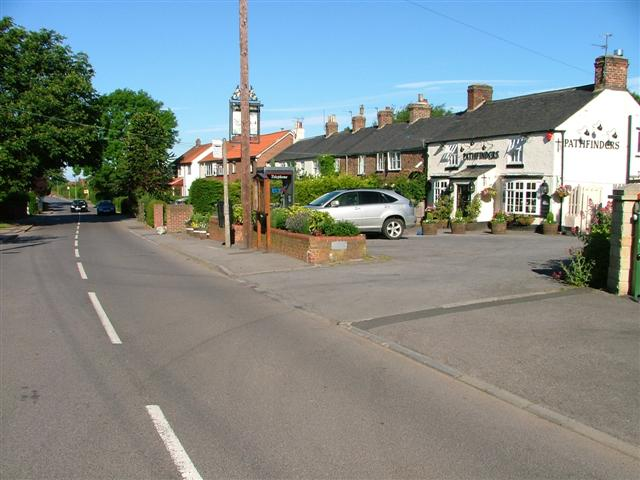
The Pathfinders public house, Maltby

Maltby is a village and civil parish in the borough of Stockton-on-Tees and ceremonial county of North Yorkshire, England. It is located to the east of the A19. The population of the civil parish taken at the 2011 census was 293.

== Amenities ==
Maltby has a number of local amenities serving the village including a small methodist chapel and a cricket club, and 'Chadwicks' a 19th-century public house, which was originally called the Half Moon Inn, and The Pathfinders.

== Ingleby Manor development ==
Since 2015 Maltby has expanded significantly due to the construction of 350 homes on the parish's western edge, adjacent to Maltby cricket ground. The development includes Maltby's secondary school.

== Education ==
=== Ingleby Manor ===
Ingleby Manor Free School is an academy and sixth form operated by Delta Academies Trust. Ingleby Manor Free School was established in 2014, with an initial intake of approximately 80 year 7 pupils. It initially operated from a converted warehouse, before relocating to a new purpose-built site in 2016.

== Administration ==
The village is part of the Stockton South parliamentary constituency, represented since the 2019 general election by Matt Vickers of the Conservative Party. The constituency was previously represented by Labour MP Paul Williams (2017-2019), James Wharton (Conservative, 2010–2017), and before that by Dari Taylor (Labour, 1997–2010).

Locally it has its own parish council, and is represented on Stockton Council as part of the Ingleby Barwick East ward, along with neighbouring Hilton village and its parish.
