= Astrea Academy Woodfields =

Academy in Doncaster, South Yorkshire, England

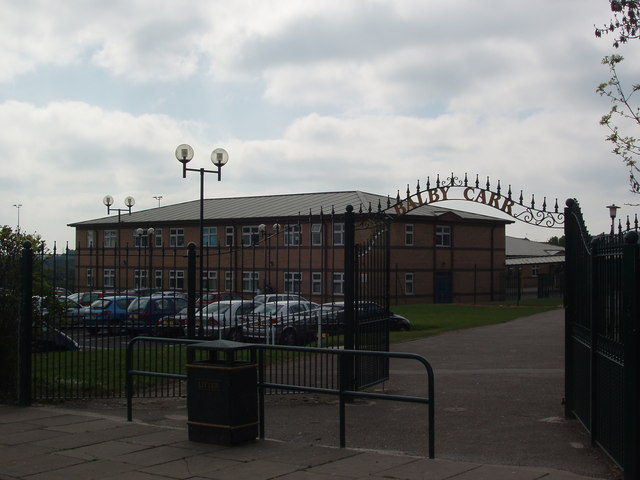
- The school in 2007 (as Balby Carr Sports College)
- Balby; Doncaster, South Yorkshire; England

Information
- Type: Academy
- Department for Education URN: 146370 Tables
- Ofsted: Reports
- Gender: Mixed-sex

Astrea Academy Woodfields is a secondary school and sixth form located in the Balby area of Doncaster in the English county of South Yorkshire.

== History ==
In 2004, a City Learning Centre (CLC) was founded on the Balby Carr campus. Doncaster South CLC (City Learning Centre) was opened to provide students and teachers in the local area with e-learning and technology-based projects. These included local history projects, the production of film and television programmes (using the specialised on-campus TV studio) and nationally award-winning learning content for the teaching of mathematics, science and history. The centre also offered dedicated conference, meeting and training facilities for business and community users. However, in September 2011 it was announced that the Balby CLC would face closure at the end of that year, along with the CLC in Scawthorpe. Doncaster Council attributed the closure to lack of use by Balby Carr school with Mayor Peter Davies declaring, "This is clearly no demand for this type of thing as far as the school are concerned."

In February 2010, it was announced that part of the most southerly block of the school needed to be demolished and replaced. In Winter's white paper, Achieving Success, the work to be done on Balby Carr school was given priority and scheduled to take place in 2011. However, following announcements by the former Secretary of State for Education Michael Gove on 5 July 2010, the improvements - due to be made to the school under the Building Schools for the Future programme - were brought to a halt.

=== Educational standards ===
In 2006, only 19% of students gained 5 or more GCSEs, including maths and English. By 2009, this number had risen to 25%. An Ofsted inspection in November 2005 judged the school to require a "Notice to Improve". A subsequent inspection in January 2007 noted, "...the school no longer requires significant improvement. The school is improving: it is now satisfactory in virtually all aspects of its work and provides satisfactory value for money."

By 2009, the last year for which figures have been published, the CVA score for Balby Carr at Key Stage 2 to 4 had risen to 1002.1. The 2009 Ofsted report stated that "(Balby Carr) is a satisfactory school that is clearly improving. It is well regarded in the local community and parents think well of it. One parent’s view, shared by the inspectors, is that ‘all staff are very friendly, approachable and professional’. As a result of the good care, guidance and support they receive, students feel safe, secure and proud of their school."

The Ofsted Data Dashboard for the school showed that the 2012 results were a slight increase from the previous year with 2% more achieving 5 A*-C grades including maths and English, with a 2% decrease in the number of students achieving English A*-C (58%) leaving the school in the 4th quintile measured against both similar and all schools. In 2012, 56% of students achieved grade C or above in maths, a 2% increase, which still left the school in the lowest quintile or bottom 20% even when measured against similar schools. In science, the school had a 16% decrease in results compared to the previous year.

In January 2013, an Ofsted inspection resulted in the school being put into "Special Measures", citing inadequate leadership and pupil behaviour and attainment.

As of 2026, the school's most recent inspection by Ofsted was in 2024, and resulted in a judgement of Good.

== Additional information ==
The school stages many theatrical productions, including a production of the musical The Little Shop of Horrors (February 2007) and Willy Russell's Our day Out, The Wizard of Oz (September 2008) and Bugsy Malone (February 2010).
