= Wonderful World =

Wonderful World, A Wonderful World, or What a Wonderful World may refer to:

== Music ==
=== Albums ===
- A Wonderful World (Tony Bennett and k.d. lang album)
- A Wonderful World (Susan Boyle album)
- Wonderful World (Eva Cassidy album)
- Wonderful World (Israel Kamakawiwoʻole album)
- Wonderful World! (The Kelly Family album), an album by The Kelly Family
- What a Wonderful World (Anne Murray album)
- What a Wonderful World (Willie Nelson album)
- What a Wonderful World (LeAnn Rimes album)
- What a Wonderful World (Louis Armstrong album), an album by Louis Armstrong
- Wonderful World (Telex album), an album by Telex

=== Songs ===
- "What a Wonderful World", a song by Louis Armstrong
- "Wonderful World" (Sam Cooke song), a song covered by Herman's Hermits
- "Somewhere Over the Rainbow/What a Wonderful World", a medley by Israel Kamakawiwoʻole
- "Wonderful World!!", a song by Kanjani8 from 8 Uppers
- "Wonderful World" (James Morrison song)
- "Wonderful World" (Cliff Richard song), a song also recorded by Elvis Presley
- "Wonderful World", a song by Phil Sawyer performing as Beautiful World from In Existence
- "Wonderful World", a song by Tesla from Bust a Nut
- "Wonderful World", a song by Nine Horses from Snow Borne Sorrow
- "What a Wonderful World", a song by Axwell and Bob Sinclar, featuring Ron Carroll

== Other uses ==
- WWW - What a Wonderful World, a 2006 Moroccan film
- Wonderful World (2009 film), a film starring Matthew Broderick
- Wonderful World (2010 film), a Japanese film
- What a Wonderful World (film), 2014 Moldovan film
- What a Wonderful World!, a manga series by Inio Asano
- A Wonderful World (film), 2006 Mexican film
- A Wonderful World (musical), jukebox stage musical about Louie Armstrong
- Wonderful World (Australian TV series), an Australian television series
- Wonderful World (South Korean TV series), a 2024 South Korean television series
- "What a Wonderful World" (Broad City), a 2014 television episode
- What a Wonderful World, the final chapter of the manga Stone Ocean

== See also ==
- It's a Wonderful World (disambiguation)
- "Wonderful World, Beautiful People", a 1969 song by Jimmy Cliff
