= Melior Community Academy =

Location
- Chandos Road; Scunthorpe, Lincolnshire, DN17 1HA; England
- Coordinates: 53°34′16″N 0°39′53″W

Information
- Type: Academy
- Department for Education URN: 139059 Tables
- Ofsted: Reports
- Principal: Amber Bradley (formerly Graeme Levitt)
- Gender: Coeducational
- Age: 11 to 16
- Website: http://www.melior.org.uk/

Melior Community Academy is a coeducational secondary school with academy status in Scunthorpe, North Lincolnshire, England. The school is sponsored by the School Partnership Trust Academies.
