= Easterside =

Estate in Middlesbrough, North Yorkshire, England

Coordinates: 54.543°N 1.217°W

Easterside is an area in the Ladgate ward of Middlesbrough, North Yorkshire, England. It is bounded to the east by Marton Road (A172) and by B1380 (Ladgate Lane) to the south. It had a population of 2,842 in 2011.

== Ladgate Ward ==
Ladgate ward is named after Ladgate Lane, the road that separates the wards two areas. Easterside has a larger centre than Tollesby, the latter is closer to the original village of Marton than its modern centre. By postcode, Easterside lies in TS4, and Tollesby in TS7 and TS8. The ward had a population of 5,583 in 2011. The Middlesbrough Municipal Golf Course is also in the ward.

== Geography and architecture ==
The area is 2 1/3 miles (3.8 km) south-east of the Middlesbrough town hall. The architectural style is broadly similar to the nearby Beechwood and Saltersgill in the same postcode, TS4, as well as parts of the Pallister Park estate.

Much of its housing stock is post-war, built between the late-1950s early and mid-1960s in an open plan style with few high walls or fences and has large green spaces in common areas.

The area's centre is a small shopping street leading to St Agnes church. The church, built in 1967, has a half pyramid spire and triangle-base pyramid tower.

== Transport ==
Easterside is served by the Arriva service 29, 28, 28A every 60 minutes in Monday-Saturday daytime, and stagecoach services 10 every 30 minutes daytimes every Monday-Saturday 60 minutes on Sunday. It is located next to one of the principal road routes into the centre of the town and, as such, is affected by the infamous 'Marton Crawl' in peak periods. The Marton railway station (better described as a halt) lies about a mile east of the estate, at the eastern edge of Stewart Park and is on the Esk Valley Line that joins Middlesbrough and Whitby. There is also a stop at James Cook University Hospital, bearing the same name.

== Sport ==
There are several playing facilities in the area. On the western edge of the area are the Saltersgill playing fields, the home of Acklam Rugby Club. These facilities are also used and maintained by the University of Teesside. The Middlesbrough Sports Village, a velodrome, skate park and tennis courts are on the other side of Marton Road on the site formerly known as Prissick Base.

== Schools ==
The estate has three schools: Easterside Academy (Easterside Primary School as was), the St Thomas More RC Primary School, and Holmwood School for pupils with special educational needs.

== Churches ==
The estate was served by the Anglican Church of St Agnes, which was built as a result of donation by Agnes Spencer and was opened in 1967. Its architects were Mortimer Partners of Northallerton. The Roman Catholic Church of St Thomas More lies close to the social club on the outskirts of Beechwood. It was demolished in 2023 and only the spike remains.
