= A1085 road =

Road in England

Coordinates: 54.59279°N 1.12692°W

A1085

Route information
- Length: 11.3 mi (18.2 km)

Major junctions
- West end: A172, Middlesbrough
- A172 A171; A66 A1053 A1042 A174
- East end: A174, Marske-by-the-Sea

Location
- Country: United Kingdom
- Constituent country: England

Road network
- Roads in the United Kingdom; Motorways; A and B road zones

The A1085 is a road that runs from Middlesbrough to Marske-by-the-Sea in the former county of Cleveland. There is a long straight part of the road whilst it passes the former ICI Wilton plant towards Redcar, this part of the road is the main road towards Redcar from the west and towards Middlesbrough and the A66 from the east. It is 11.3 miles (18.2 km) long.
