= Saltersgill =

Area of Middlesbrough, North Yorkshire, England

Coordinates: 54.550°N 1.233°W

Saltersgill is an area in the Longlands and Beechwood Ward of Middlesbrough, North Yorkshire, England. In the 2011 census it had a population of 2,679. The area has a TS4 postcode.

== Local amenities ==
The local shops are located along Saltersgill avenue. These include takeaway restaurants, a bakers, a betting shop and convenience stores including a Sainsbury's local. Also located on this road is the local pub The Saltersgill. Between Saltersgill and Easterside the Saltersgill playing fields. These facilities are also used and maintained by the University of Teesside.

== Schools ==
Prince Bishop School – Secondary school that teaches students with emotional, behavioural and social difficulties.

Beverley School – A specialist technology School for pupils with Autism aged 3–19 years.

Trinity Catholic College – Catholic school and college for pupils aged 11–19.

== See also ==
- Easterside
- Grove Hill, Middlesbrough
- Tollesby
