= Grove Hill, Middlesbrough =

Area of Middlesbrough, North Yorkshire, England

Coordinates: 54.5589°N 1.2213°W

Grove Hill
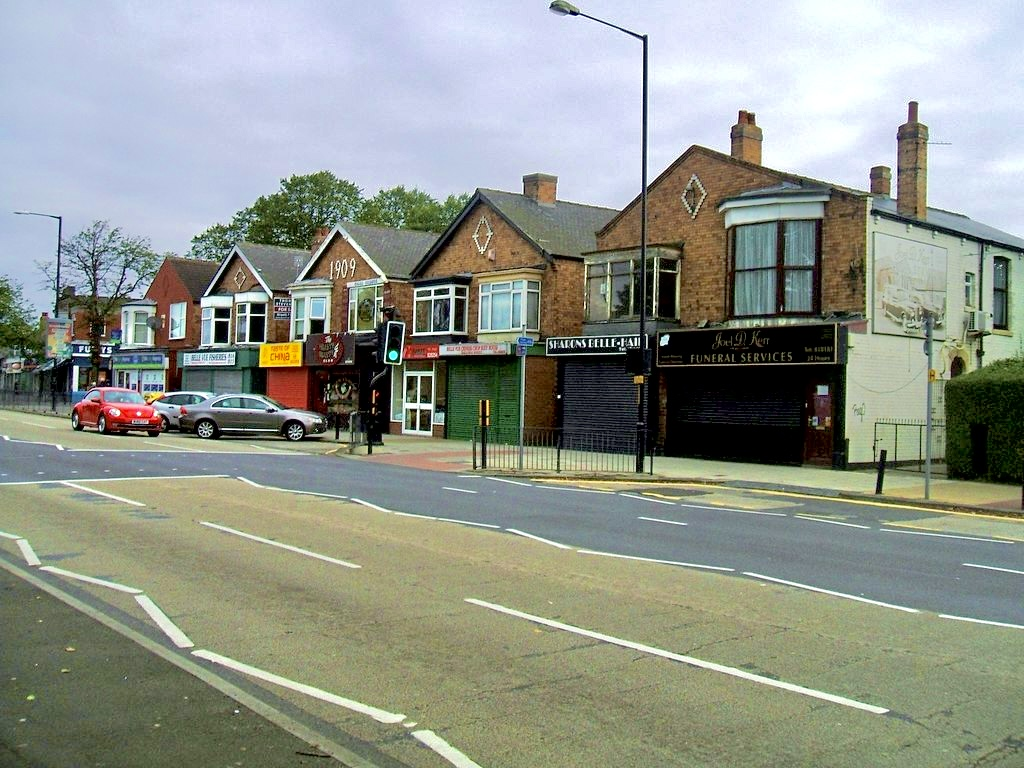
- The local shops

- Location within North Yorkshire
- OS grid reference: NZ504184
- Unitary authority: Middlesbrough
- Ceremonial county: North Yorkshire
- Region: North East
- Country: England
- Sovereign state: United Kingdom
- Post town: MIDDLESBROUGH
- Postcode district: TS4
- Dialling code: 01642
- Police: Cleveland
- Fire: Cleveland
- Ambulance: North East
- UK Parliament: Middlesbrough
- Councillors: Longlands and Beechwood Ward: Peter Gavigan (L); Joan McTigue (independent)

Grove Hill is an area of the Middlesbrough's Longlands and Beechwood ward in the Borough of Middlesbrough, North Yorkshire, England. It is a historic part of the North Riding of Yorkshire. The area's main shopping area is off Marton Road at the junction with Marton Burn Road and Belle Vue.

The majority of the area was within the civil parish of Marton before the area and Marton itself became unparished areas of the town. Marton Grove Primary School served the area for 83 years before its closure in 2011 and demolition in 2012.

They are also shops on the other end of Marton Burn Road, at the roundabout with Eastborne, Valley, Bishopton and York roads. These shops formerly had the Palladium cinema, demolished in 1960.

Since the early 2000s, the area was subject to a regeneration scheme which saw many houses demolished. There was also a proposal to rename the area after anti-social behaviour had left the area with a reputation. The council stated that a "...rebranding would help create a place where people want to live".

== Longlands and Beechwood ==
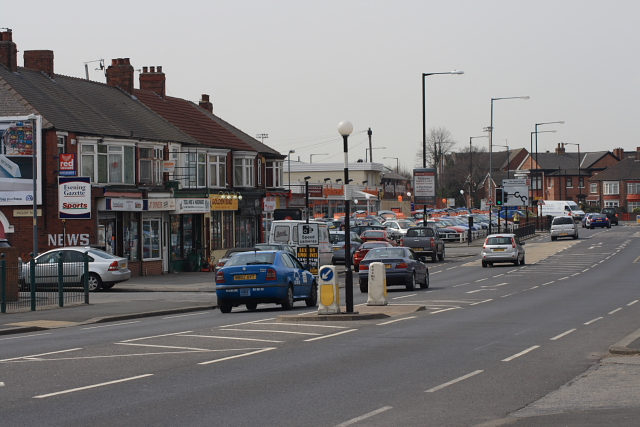
Longlands

Longlands is split by Longlands road between the ward and central ward with shops on said road and Marton Road. Breckon Hill Primary School is also in the area. The northern area was formerly in the Westbourne Ward and became part of the University Ward with Southfield. Beechwood is west of James Cook University Hospital.

== Clairville ==
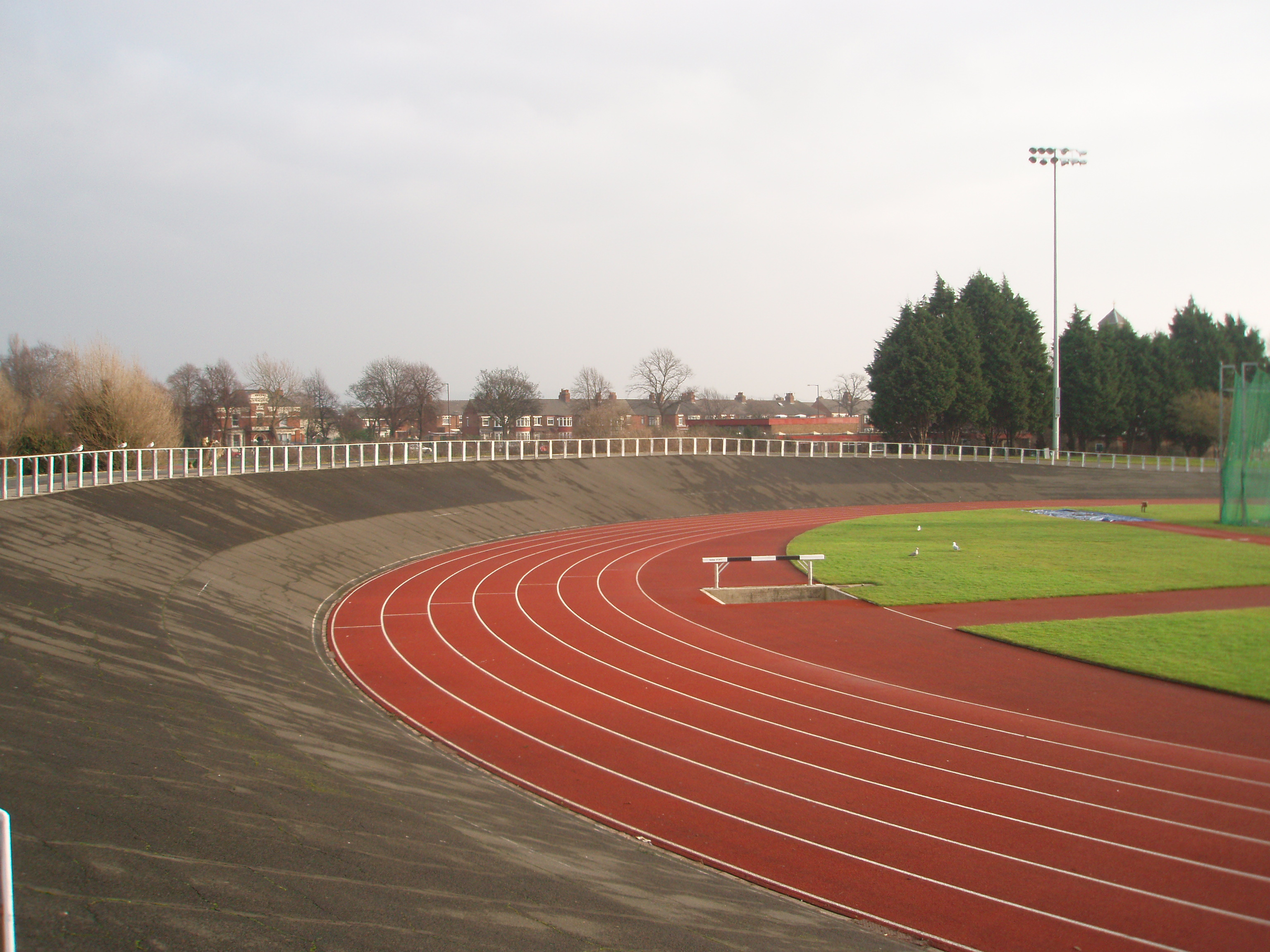
Clairville Stadium in 2010, the site was demolished in 2015

With Clairville Stadium's 26 July 1963 opening in the area (by Prince Philip, Duke of Edinburgh) the area's ward became known as Clairville while the area remained known as Grove Hill.

The Clairville ward had a population of 5,346 in the 2011 census. In May 2015, Beechwood and Clairville merged into the Longlands and Beechwood ward.

== Gallery ==
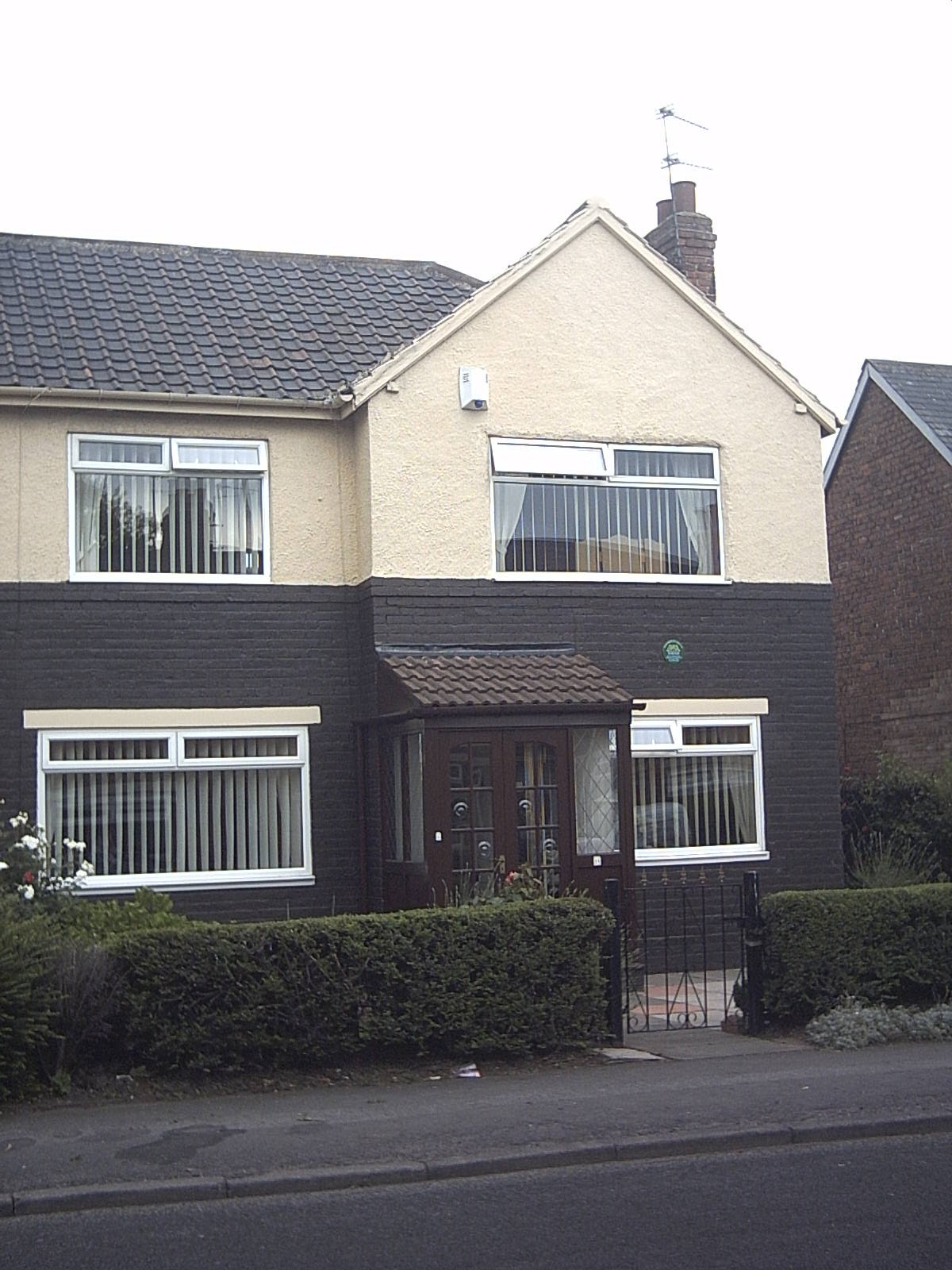
11 Valley Road – Brian Clough's old home

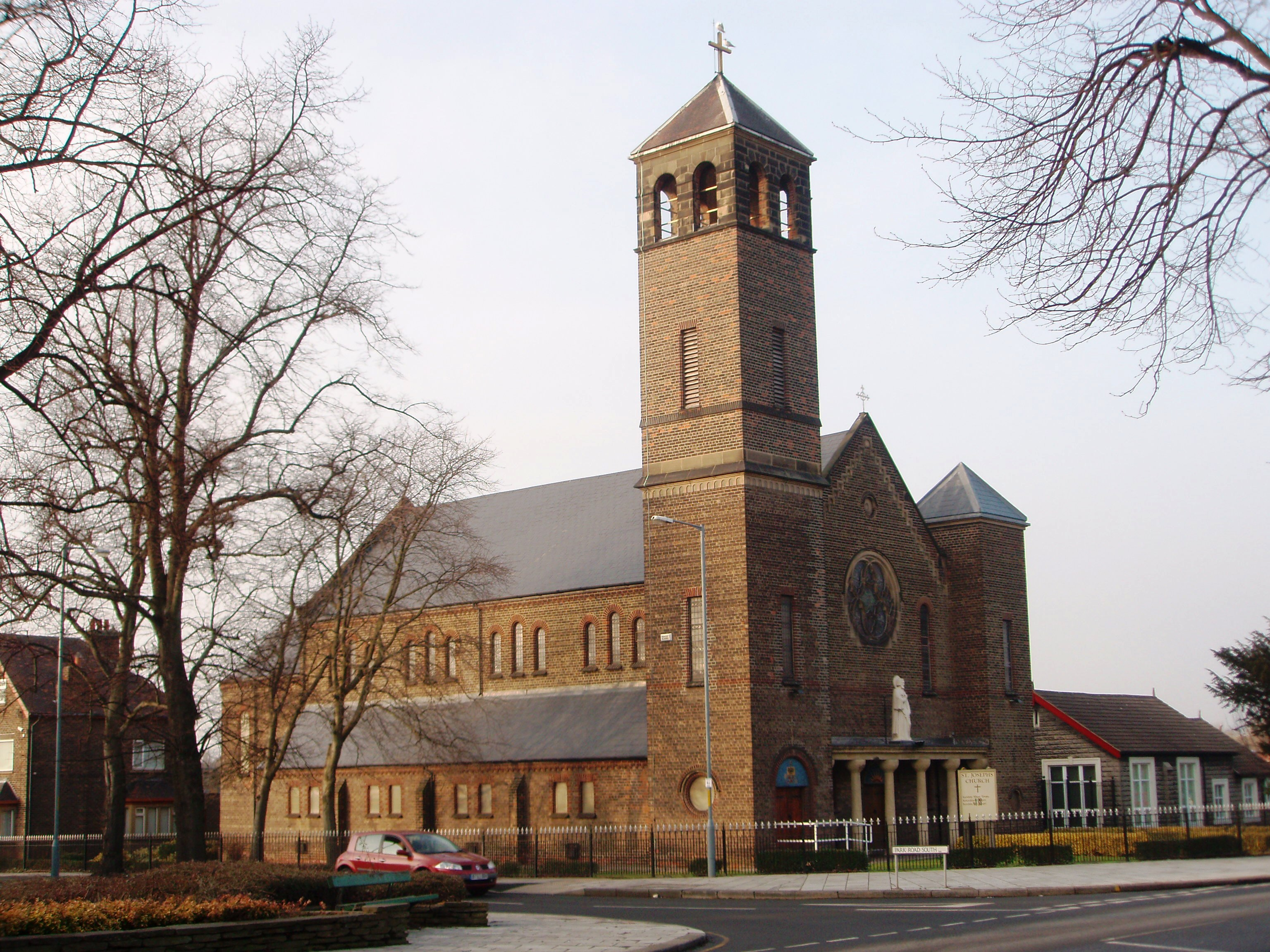
St Joseph's Church, between Grove Hill and Longlands

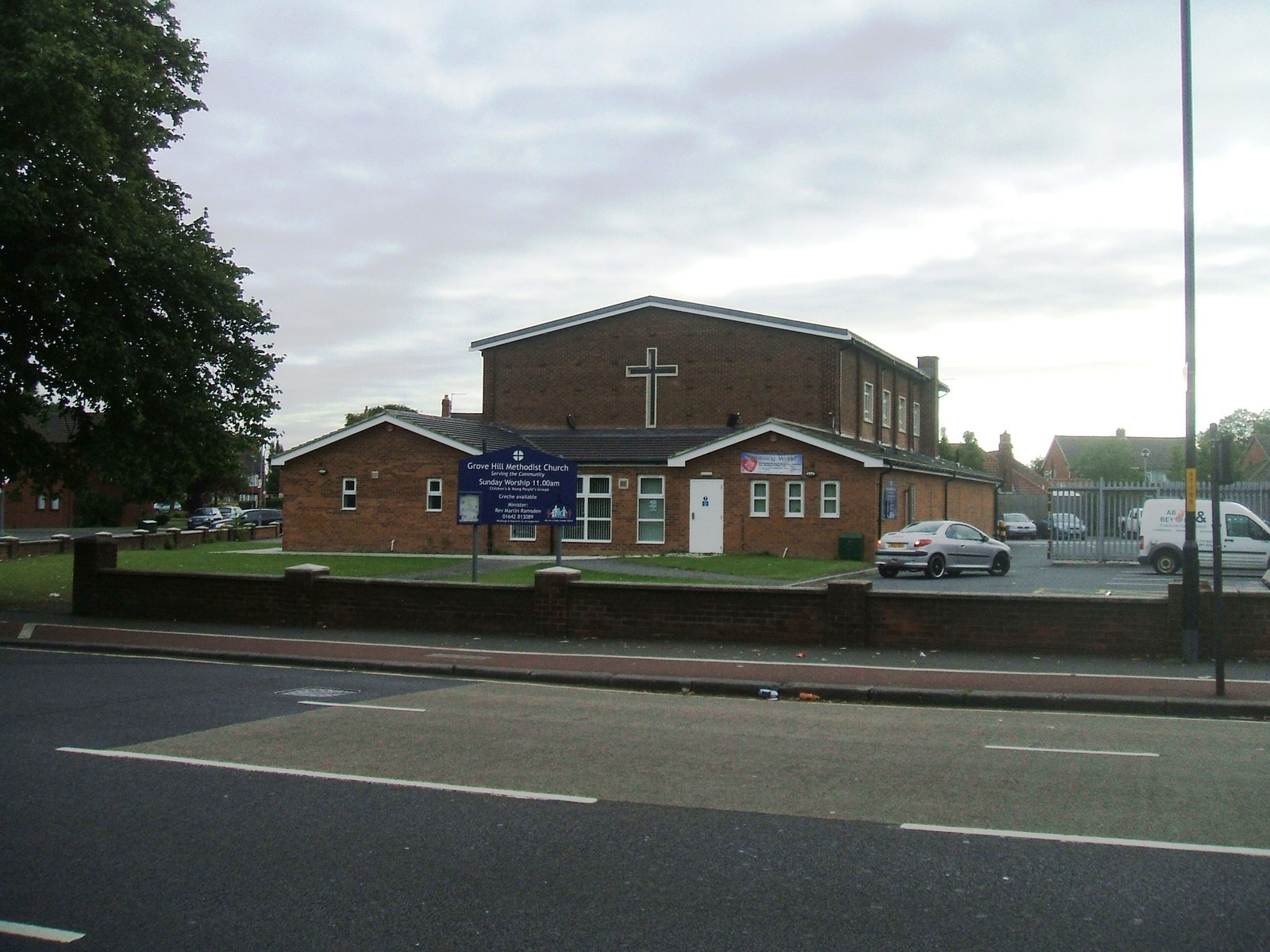
The local Methodist Church

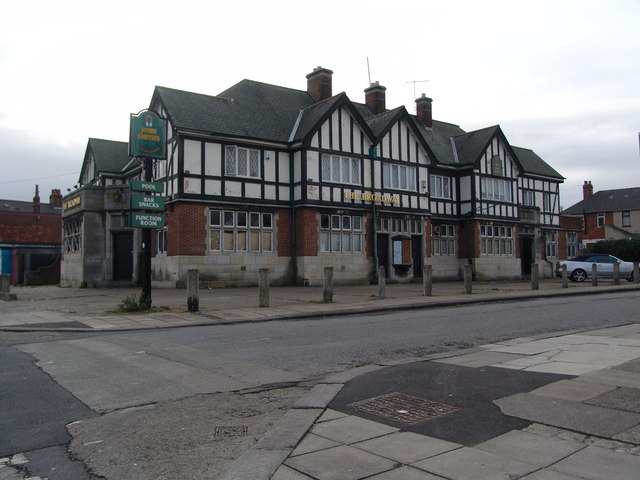
Broadway Pub, Palladium shops

== See also ==
- Brian Clough (1935–2004), footballer and manager
- Saltersgill
