= A172 =

A172, A-172 may refer to:

- A172 road (England), a road connecting Ingleby Arncliffe and Middlesbrough
- A172 road (Malaysia), a road in Perak connecting Pengkalan Hulu and Kampung Baru Tasek
- A-172 (cell line), a human glioblastoma cell line
