= West Hartlepool =

Predecessor of Hartlepool, County Durham, England

Coordinates: 54.68892°N 1.22498°W

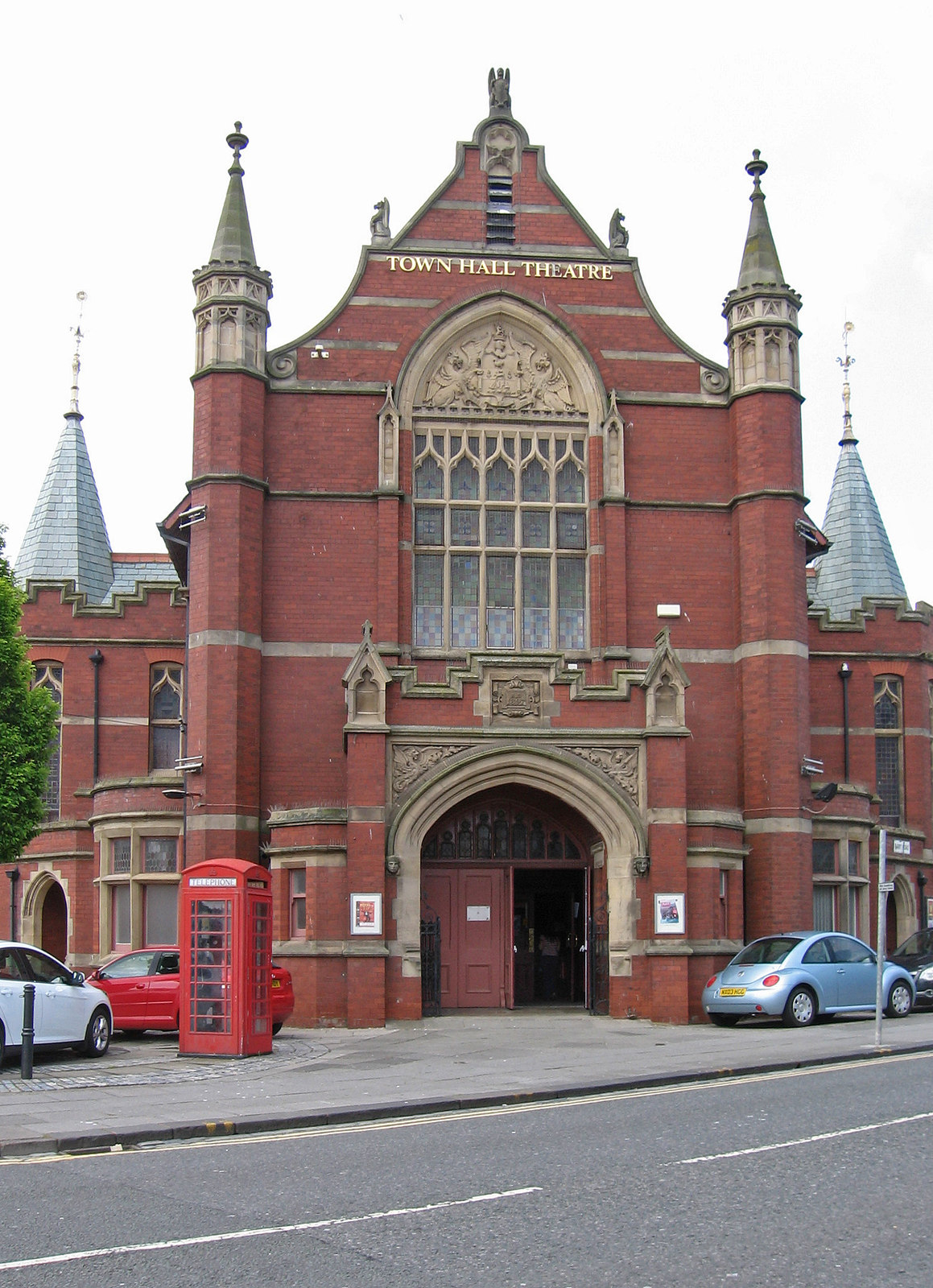
- West Hartlepool Town Hall

- Location within County Durham
- Unitary authority: Hartlepool
- Ceremonial county: Durham
- Region: North East
- Country: England
- Sovereign state: United Kingdom
- Post town: HARTLEPOOL
- Postcode district: TS24
- Dialling code: 01429
- Police: Cleveland
- Fire: Cleveland
- Ambulance: North East

West Hartlepool was a predecessor of Hartlepool, County Durham, England. It developed in the Victorian era and took the name from its western position in the parish of what is now known as the Headland.

The former town was originally formed in 1848 as an accompanying settlement for nearby railway and docks, which brought and exported coal from the area. The rail network grew, connecting to docks in Leeds and other cities. Further developments in the area led to the 1960s formation of Hartlepool as a town.

== History ==
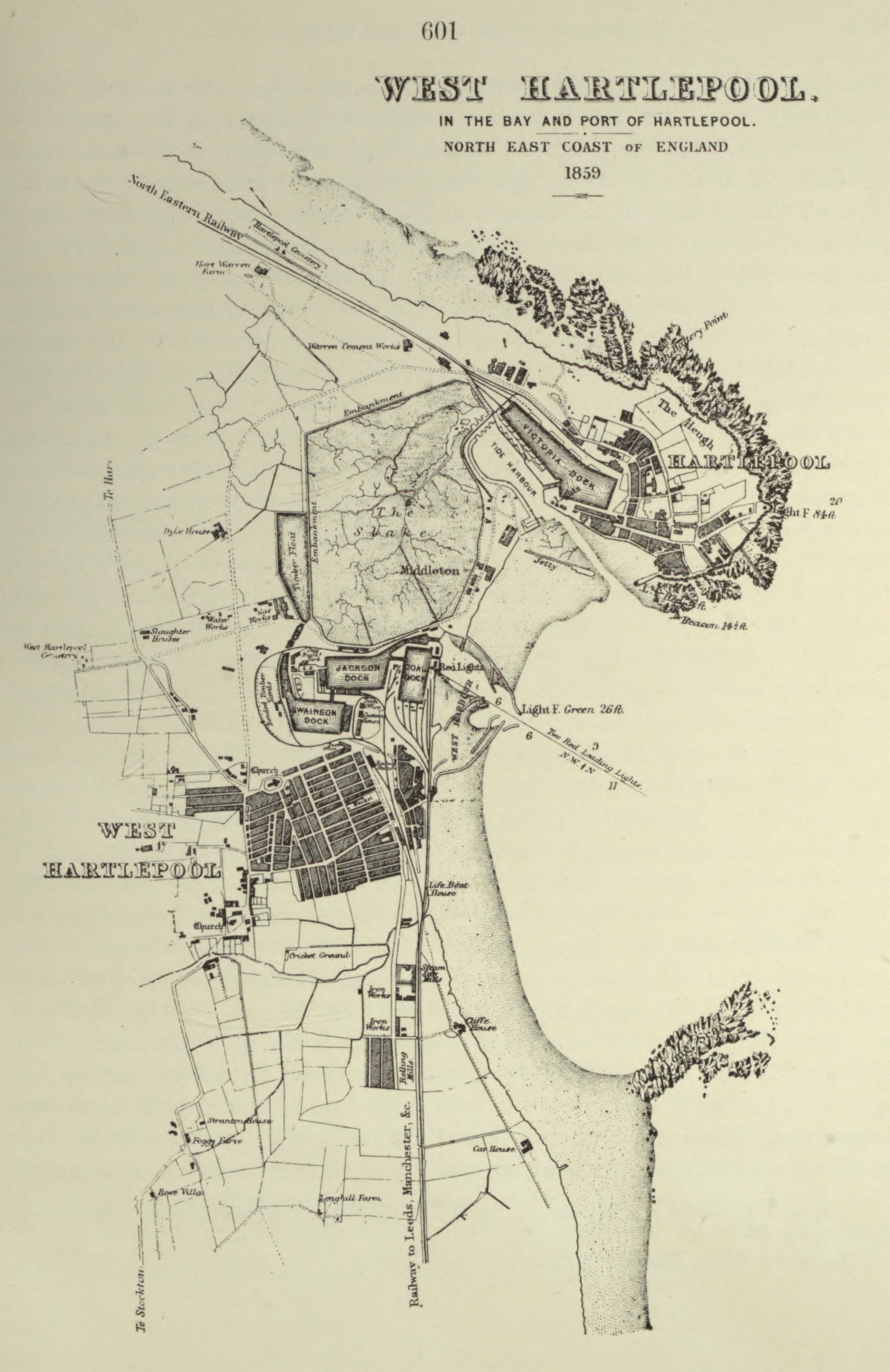
West Hartlepool map, 1859

The town of West Hartlepool was founded by Ralph Ward Jackson who went on to become managing director of the Stockton and Hartlepool Railway in 1848.

The area known as Newburn Raw, part of the ancient village of Stranton, steadily grew into a centre for shipping and railway transport. The West Hartlepool Harbour and Dock (8 acres (0.032 km^{2})) opened on 1 June 1847. Five years later, also on 1 June, the Jackson dock (14 acres (0.057 km^{2})) opened as well as a railway connecting West Hartlepool to Leeds, Manchester and Liverpool. Massive timber trading with Baltic countries began as timber was needed for pitprops in nearby coal mines. The area's population grew quickly as a result. Eight shipbuilding yards were established. Supporting shipbuilding and repair were: a canvas manufacturing firm, Bastow Brothers and W. Taylor iron foundries, block and mast makers and other related machinery.

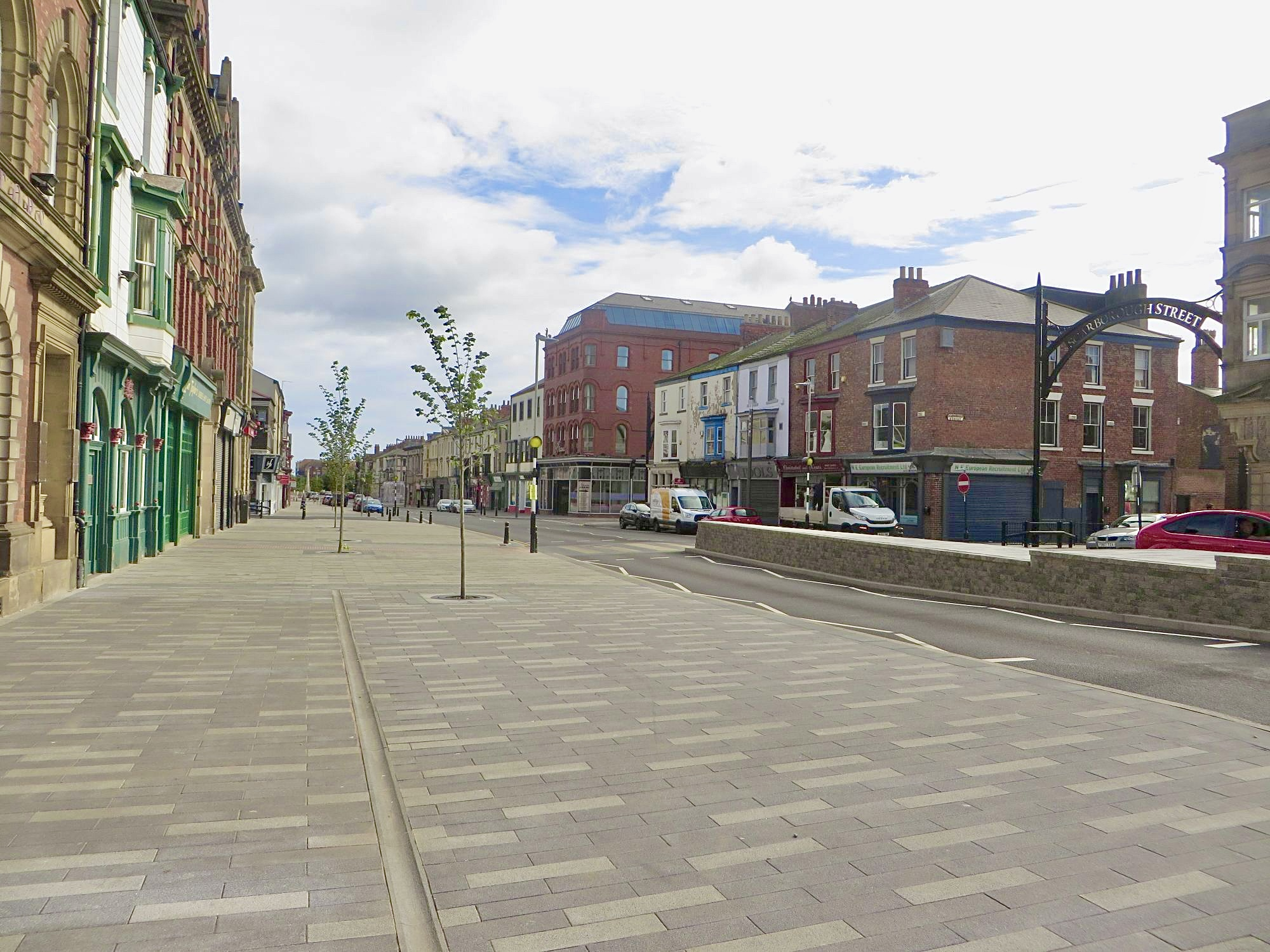
Church Street

Streets were laid out along which shops and brick homes were built. Standard town services followed including paved roads, gas and electricity, sewers, a slaughterhouse, cemetery and more.

Jackson built a large church, Christ Church, from stone excavated from the docks and the parish was consecrated in 1854 by the Bishop of Durham. Swainson Dock opened on 3 June 1856, named after Ward Jackson's father-in-law. In 1878 the William Gray & Company ship yard in West Hartlepool achieved the distinction of launching the largest tonnage of any shipyard in the world, a feat to be repeated on a number of occasions.

West Hartlepool was formerly a chapelry in the parish of Stranton, The municipal borough of West Hartlepool was created in 1887, and, with its headquarters at West Hartlepool Town Hall (built 1897). On 31 December 1894 West Hartlepool became a separate civil parish. The district was promoted to the status of county borough, outside the control of Durham County Council, in 1902. On 1 April 1967, a county borough, called Hartlepool, was established by amalgamating West Hartlepool with old Hartlepool; the parish was also abolished and merged with Hartlepool. In 1961 the parish had a population of 77,035.

== Sport ==
The town's Rugby Union football team was formed in 1881 by men who came to the area to build the railway and dig the docks, and continued until 1908 when the Hartlepool Union's round ball game was in vogue. Until 1968, the football team now known as Hartlepool United was shown in the plural - Hartlepools United - to show its links to both Hartlepool and to West Hartlepool.

== Notable people ==
- Margaret Green, artist, born in West Hartlepool
- Lionel Tertis, viola player who commissioned many new works for the instrument, born in West Hartlepool

== Gallery ==
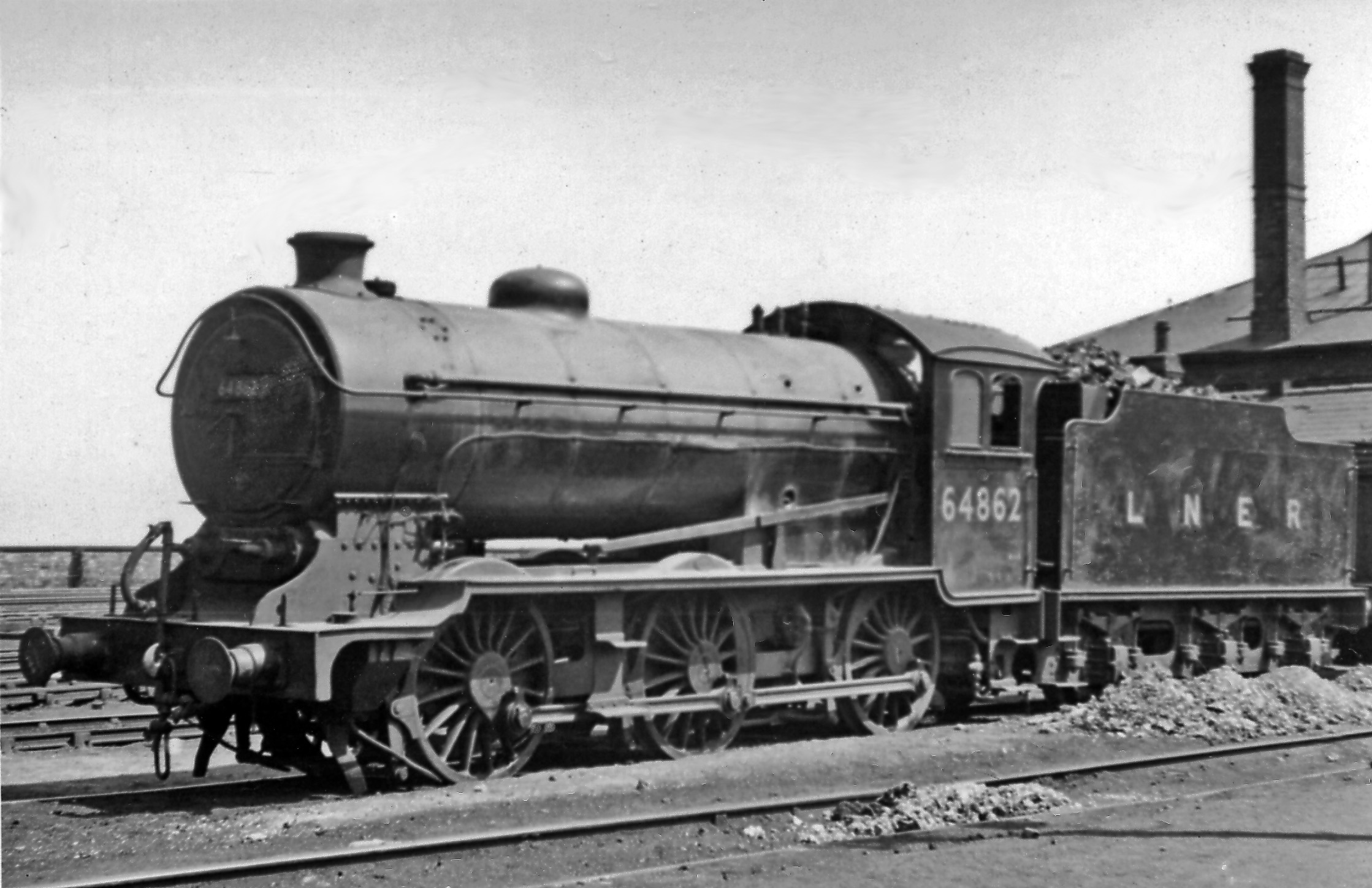
West Hartlepool Locomotive Depot

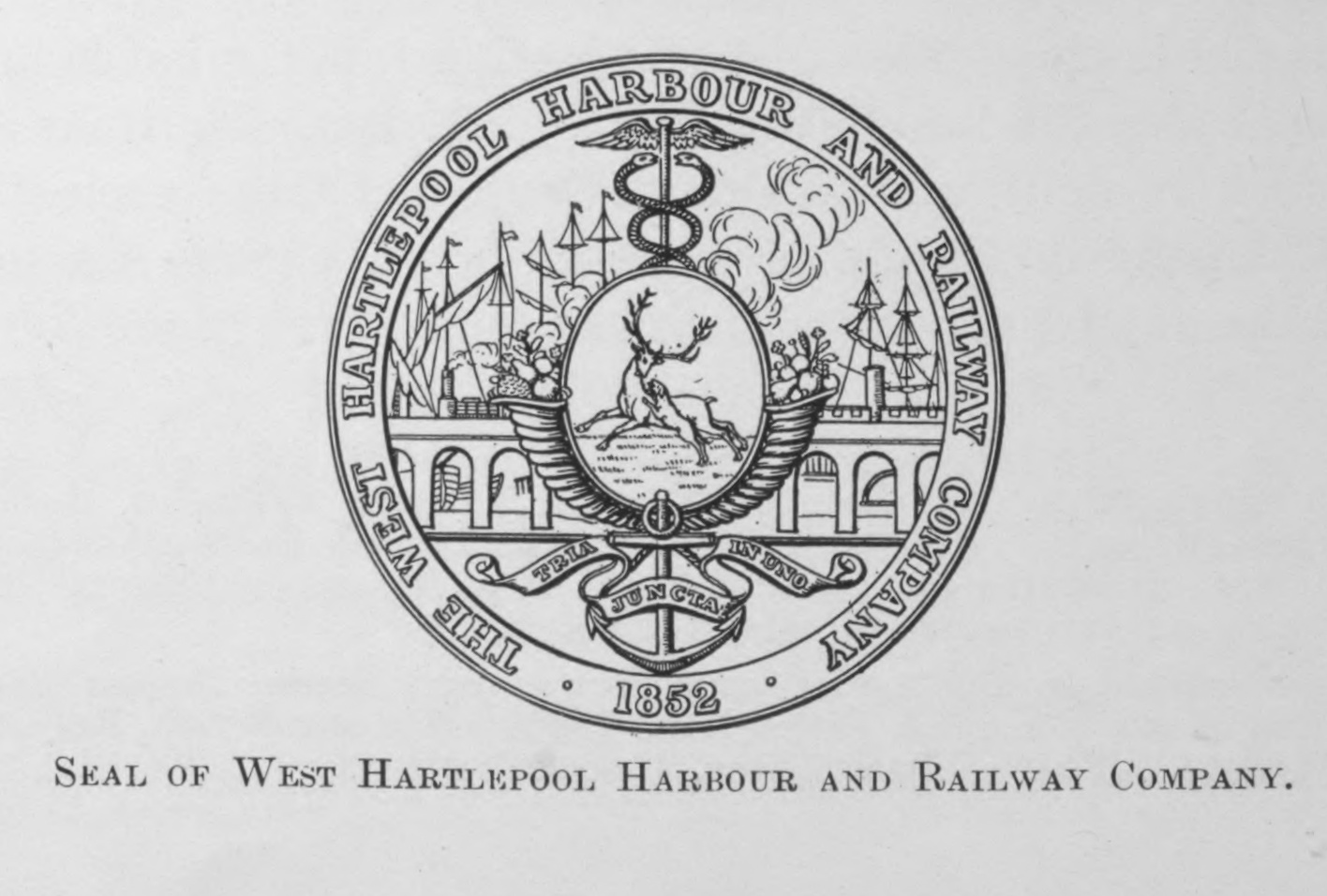
West Hartlepool harbour and railway seal

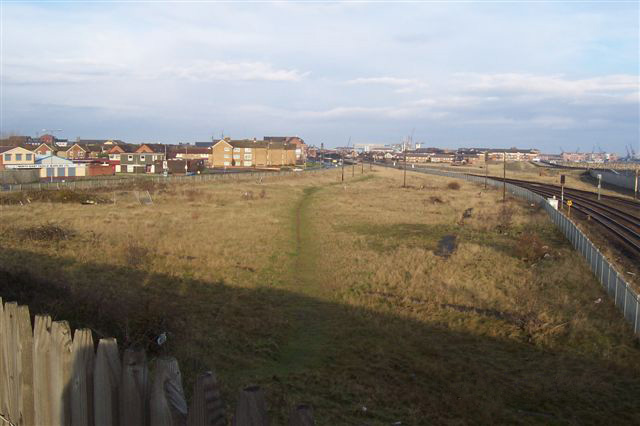
View from Newburn Bridge. This is the site of the old railways sheds in West Hartlepool.

== See also ==
- West Hartlepool War Memorial
