= Hutton Henry =

Village in County Durham, England

Coordinates: 54°43′08″N 1°20′31″W

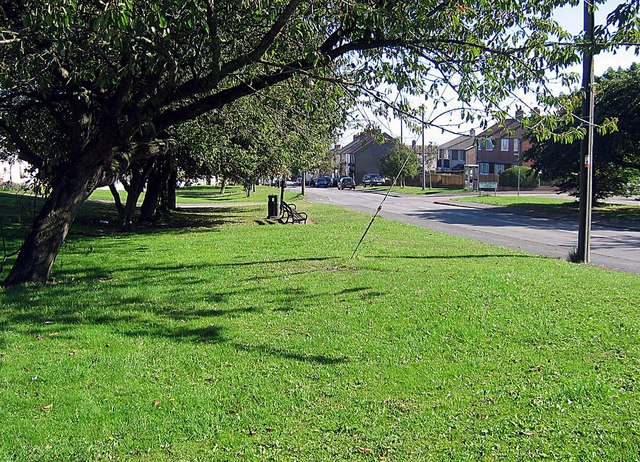
- Village green

- Location within County Durham
- Civil parish: Hutton Henry and Station Town
- Unitary authority: County Durham
- Ceremonial county: County Durham
- Region: North East
- Country: England
- Sovereign state: United Kingdom
- Post town: HARTLEPOOL
- Postcode district: TS27
- Dialling code: 01429

Hutton Henry is a village in the civil parish of Hutton Henry and Station Town , in County Durham, England, near Peterlee, Castle Eden and Wingate. The population of the parish at the 2011 census was 1,565. It is situated to the west of Hartlepool, near the villages of Wingate and Station Town. At the top of hills in Hutton Henry the sea, Blackhall Colliery, Castle Eden, Wingate, Peterlee and Shotton can be seen. On 1 February 2023 the parish was renamed from "Hutton Henry" to "Hutton Henry and Station Town".

In ca. 1050 the village was known as Hoton. Henry de Essh held it in the 14th century, providing the second part of the name. During the 19th century it was a mining village, as were the nearby villages of Wingate and Station Town. Its population increased from 156 in 1801 to 3,151 in 1891 due to the opening of collieries. Hutton Henry colliery was operational between 1876 and 1897 and was owned by Hutton Henry Coal Co. Ltd. In 1894 its average output was about 190,000 tons per annum, and it was said to employ 1,000 men and boys.
