= Captain Cook Birthplace Museum =

Museum in Marton, North Yorkshire, England

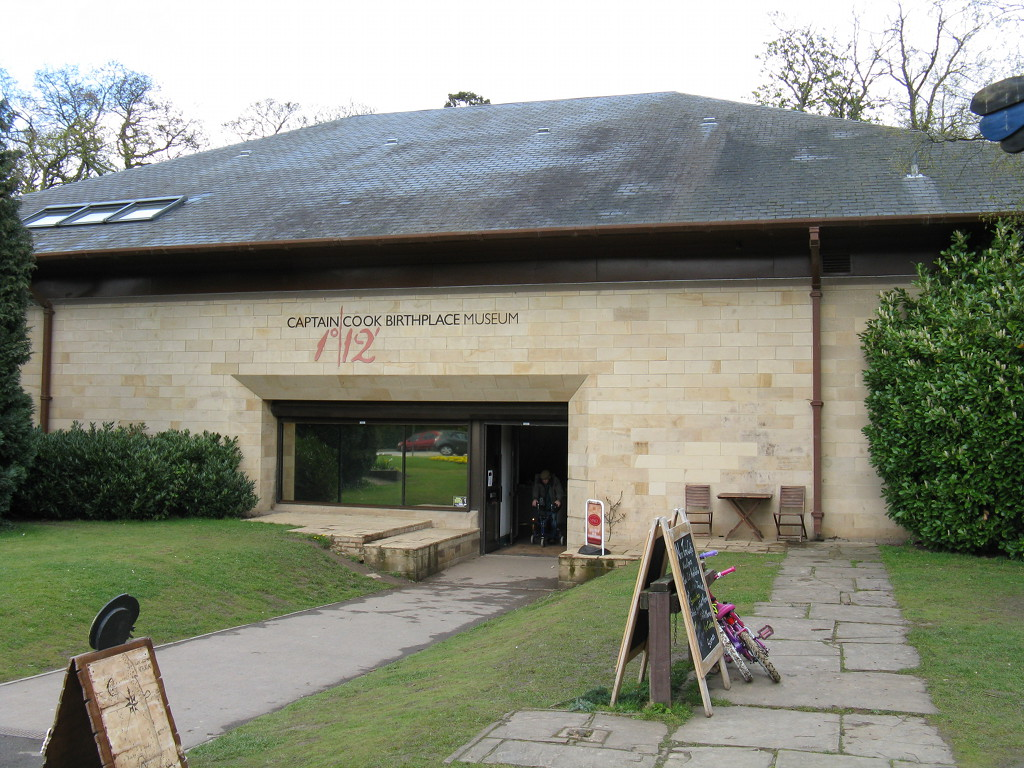
- Established: 28 October 1978
- Location: Stewart Park, Middlesbrough
- Coordinates: 54.53830°N 1.20240°W
- Parking: Use Stewart Park car park
- Website: Captain Cook Birthplace Museum

Captain Cook Birthplace Museum is a public museum located in Stewart Park in Marton, Middlesbrough within the borough of Middlesbrough and the ceremonial county of North Yorkshire, England. It is one of two institutions managed by Middlesbrough Council, along with the Dorman Museum.

The museum opened on 28 October 1978, the 250th anniversary of the birth in the same spot of British naval explorer and circumnavigator Captain James Cook. It is a biographical museum that surveys Cook's life and journeys.

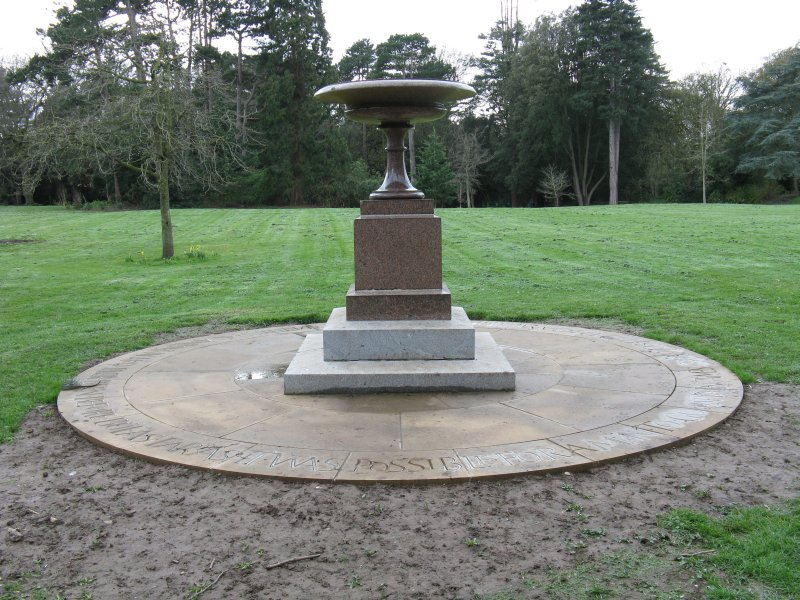
This pink granite urn is inscribed with the text "This granite urn was erected by H. W. F. Bolkow of Marton Hall A.D. 1852 to mark the site of the cottage in which Captain James Cook the world circumnavigator was born Oct 27th 1728" Location on Wikimapia

Prior to the museum's establishment, there was a granite urn in Stewart Park commemorating the grounds of Marton Hall, Cook's residence. The urn was erected in the 1850s by local industrialist and mayor Henry Bolckow. Marton Hall was destroyed by fire in 1960 during demolition, with only a stone loggia surviving.

The museum itself comprises some of the modest Cook-related collections outside of the ownership of the major national and international collections. They include household items and a speculative reconstruction of Cook's birthplace cottage that was swept away amid the landscaping process for the Marton Lodge, home to the Rudd family, which stood here until 1793. There are a series of interactive displays and temporary travelling exhibitions as well as a cafe, gift shop, education suite and resources and archive room.

A second major refurbishment was undertaken in 1998, which included the commission of two modern works of art by Turner Prize nominee Simon Patterson. The museum was reopened to the public by Sir David Attenborough. Outside the museum is an information board in deference to Marton's position as the starting point for the Captain Cook Country Tour, a product of the Cleveland-wide Captain Cook Tourism Association.
