= West Hartlepool Town Hall =

Municipal building in West Hartlepool, County Durham, England

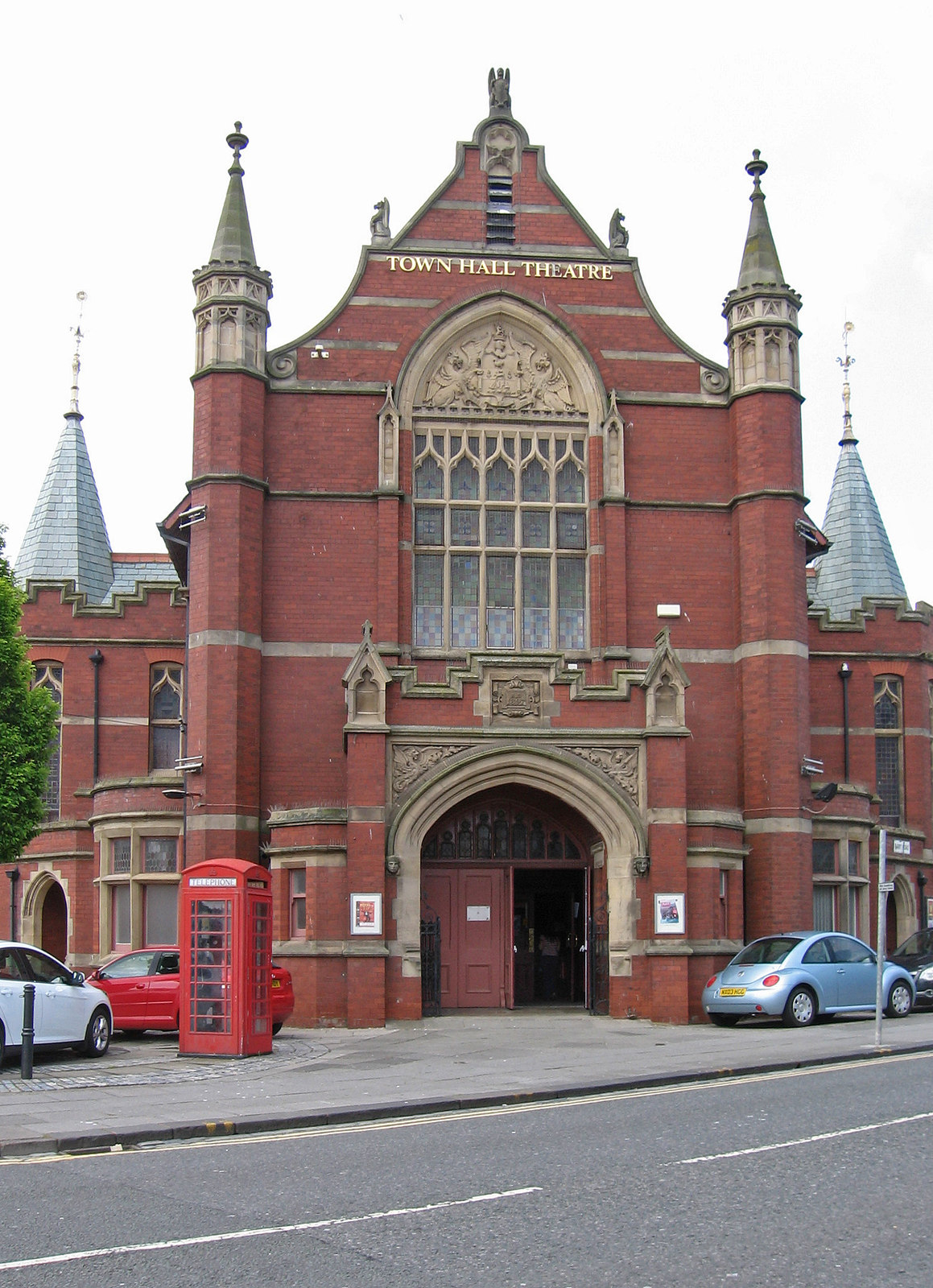
- West Hartlepool Town Hall

- Shown in County Durham
- 54.6863°N 1.2139°W
- Location: Raby Road, Hartlepool

History
- Built: 1897

Site notes
- Architect: Henry Cheers
- Architectural style: English Gothic style

Listed Building – Grade II
- Official name: Town Hall
- Designated: 17 December 1985
- Reference no.: 1250394

West Hartlepool Town Hall is an events venue in Raby Road, Hartlepool, County Durham, England. It is a Grade II listed building.

== History ==
The development of West Hartlepool was an initiative of Ralph Ward Jackson, who founded the West Hartlepool Dock Company and opened the Coal Dock to the south west of Old Hartlepool in 1847. The new town was outside the old borough boundaries of Hartlepool, but rapidly grew to overtake its older neighbour in size; by the 1880s West Hartlepool was twice the size of Old Hartlepool. In 1887 West Hartlepool was made a separate borough. The new borough council built itself offices and a meeting place at the Municipal Buildings on Church Square, which was completed in 1889. The council then decided to procure a separate building suitable for public gatherings, events and entertainments: the site they selected was open land to the west of Hart Lane (subsequently renamed Raby Road).

The foundation stone for the new building was laid by Councillor George Pyman on 18 December 1895. It was designed by Henry Cheers in the English Gothic style, built in red brick with stone dressings and was officially opened as West Hartlepool Town Hall on 1 October 1897. It was built in conjunction with a technical college which was located immediately to the west and was completed about the same time. The design, which followed a long cruciform layout, involved a symmetrical main frontage with a single wide bay, flanked by turrets with spires, facing onto Raby Street; it featured an arched porch which slightly projected forward and was decorated with carved spandrels and battlements. There was a tall five-light window with the town's coat of arms in the tympanum on the first floor and a gable above. Internally, the principal room was the assembly hall which featured a proscenium arch.

The assembly hall was used as a public venue: a pipe organ designed and manufactured by James Jepson Binns was installed in the building in 1926. Concert performers included the contralto singer, Kathleen Ferrier, who sang in Handel's Messiah in the town hall on 15 December 1948. The technical school was demolished and the town hall renovated in 1977 to allow it to be used primarily as a theatre. The theatre had a seating capacity of 404 people. Further refurbishment works were completed in 1994.
