= Thomas Spencer (businessman) =

One of the two co-founders of the retail chain Marks & Spencer

- Born: 7 November 1851; Skipton, Yorkshire, England
- Died: 25 July 1905 (aged 53); Whittington, Staffordshire, England
- Citizenship: British
- Occupations: Retail businessman and company co-founder
- Known for: Co-founder of retail company, Marks & Spencer
- Spouse: Agnes Spencer Whitfield (m. 1892)
- Children: 1 (Thomas Spencer Jr.)

Thomas Spencer (7 November 1851 – 25 July 1905) was an English businessman, known for being the co-founder with Michael Marks of Marks & Spencer, a major British retailer.

== Early life ==
Spencer was born on 7 November 1851 in Skipton, Yorkshire. He moved to Leeds before he was 21 and worked as a book-keeper for a wholesale company started by Isaac Jowitt Dewhirst.

== Marks & Spencer ==
Spencer and Michael Marks met when Dewhirst lent Marks money to run his stalls in Leeds. In 1894, when Marks had opened a permanent store in Leeds market, he invited Spencer to become a partner in what became Marks & Spencer. Spencer decided that the £300 required for a half-share in the business would be a good investment.

The running of the business was split between Spencer, who managed the office and warehouse, and Marks, who continued to run the market stalls. Spencer had developed some important contacts while working for Isaac Dewhirst and these allowed him to get the best prices for goods by dealing directly with the manufacturers.

In 1903, Marks & Spencer became a limited company: Spencer retired later that year.

== Personal life ==
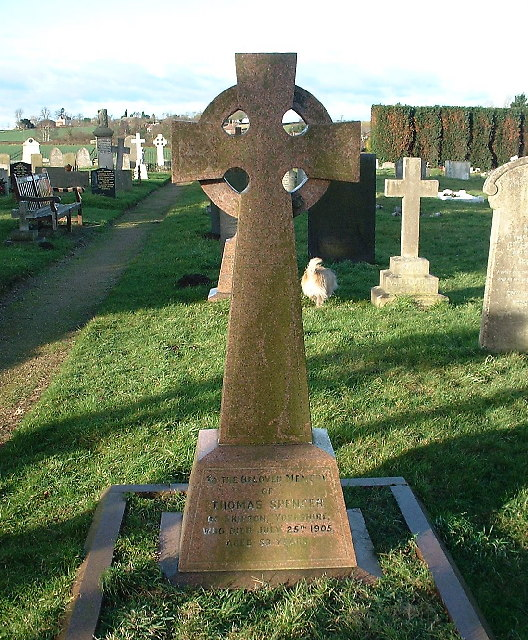
Thomas Spencer's grave in Whittington, Staffordshire

Spencer met and married his wife Agnes (née Whitfield) at St Saviour, Cross Green, Leeds, in 1892. She was born in the village of Marton, now a part of Middlesbrough. Together they had a son named Thomas Spencer Jr.

Spencer died on 25 July 1905, in Whittington, Staffordshire. His wife continued to fund charitable work such as the Church of St Agnes in Easterside, Middlesbrough, after his death, and died in 1959, now buried in the graveyard of St Cuthbert's Parish Church in Marton.
