= A174 road =

Road in North Yorkshire, England

A174

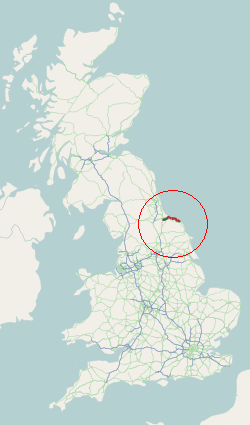

Route information
- Length: 32.9 mi (52.9 km)

Major junctions
- West end: Thornaby-on-Tees; 54.5282°N 1.2989°W
- A1044; A19 A172 A171 A1053 A1042 A1085 A173 A1044 A1032 A171
- East end: Whitby; 54.4807°N 0.6209°W

Location
- Country: United Kingdom
- Primary destinations: Middlesbrough, Redcar, Whitby

Road network
- Roads in the United Kingdom; Motorways; A and B road zones
← A173	→ A176

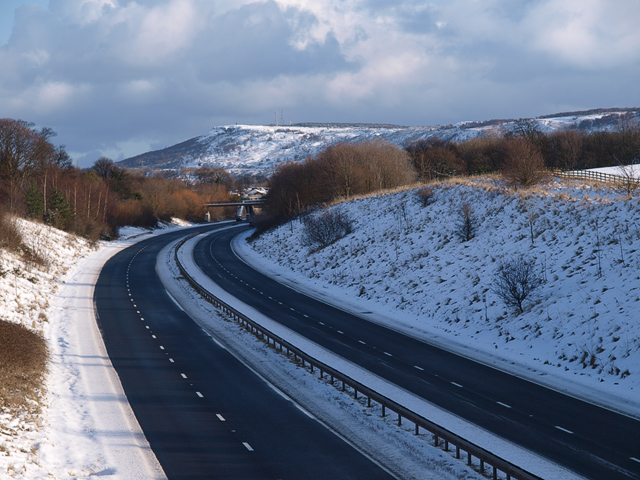
A174 Parkway in the snow

The A174 is a major road in North Yorkshire, England. It runs from the A19 road at Thornaby-on-Tees, across South Teesside and down the Yorkshire Coast to Whitby. The A174 is the coastal route between Teesside and Whitby; the alternative road, the A171, is described as being the moorland route.

== Route description ==
The route starts at Thornaby Road with a junction on the A1044 road going eastwards towards the A19 road. This section was single carriageway, but it was upgraded as part of the long-term plans for the area. After the junction with the A19, the route cuts across South Teesside taking an east/west cut past Normanby, Ormesby and Eston to a junction with the A1053 road to Grangetown. It is here that it loses its Trunk Road status (this carries on up the A1053), but the dual carriageway A174 continues east past Yearby before becoming a single carriageway. The route of A1053 and A174, is the preferred route inwards and outwards to and from the A19 for traffic going to and from Teesport.

The road turns south at New Marske before going in a generally south easterly direction towards Whitby. The road south of Sandsend was opened out providing a wider carriageway by cutting into the cliff on the west side. Spoil from this project was dumped into Rawthwaite Valley just to the north, infilling a large part of the valley. The road at Sandsend was strengthened in 2015 on account of the effect of the sea upon its base. Over £7 million was spent on the road to prevent future erosion issues. The section from Hinderwell through Sandsend along the coast to Whitby is a recommended drive by The Telegraph, which states the road "sweeps down to Whitby".

== Bypasses ==
In February 2001, a 3.5 miles (5.6 km) diversion was opened between Skelton-in-Cleveland and Brotton. The new road cost £14.5 million and work had begun in January 1996 and involved building on a 3,000 year old Iron Age fort. At the same time, the old A174 route through Saltburn-by-the-Sea, was downgraded form 'A' road status and money was spent on traffic calming measures.

The dual carriageway ends east of Yearby at the Grewgrass Lane roundabout.

== Safety ==
The trunk section of road between Thornaby and Lazenby is noted by the Highway Agency as being in the middle zone for casualties and accidents. The roundabout between the A1053 and the A174 is also noted for being an accident blackspot.
