= Marton, Queensland =

Marton Queensland
- Coordinates: 15.4333°S 145.1666°E
- Postcode(s): 4895
- Time zone: AEST (UTC+10:00)
- Location: 9.9 km (6 mi) NW of Cooktown; 335 km (208 mi) N of Cairns; 657 km (408 mi) NNW of Townsville; 2,005 km (1,246 mi) NNW of Brisbane
- LGA(s): Shire of Cook
- State electorate(s): Cook
- Federal division(s): Leichhardt

Marton is a town in the Shire of Cook, Queensland, Australia. The town is within the locality of Cooktown.

== History ==
The town was named after the former Marton railway station on the former Cooktown to Laura railway, which in turn was named after the birthplace of Captain Cook in Marton, Yorkshire, England.
