= A173 road =

Road in North Yorkshire, England

A173

Route information
- Length: 11.7 mi (18.8 km)

Major junctions
- North end: Stokesley; 54.4699°N 1.1814°W
- A172 A171 A174
- South end: Skelton; 54.5604°N 0.9522°W

Location
- Country: United Kingdom

Road network
- Roads in the United Kingdom; Motorways; A and B road zones
← A172	→ A174

The A173 is a major road in North Yorkshire, England. It runs from Stokesley to Skelton.

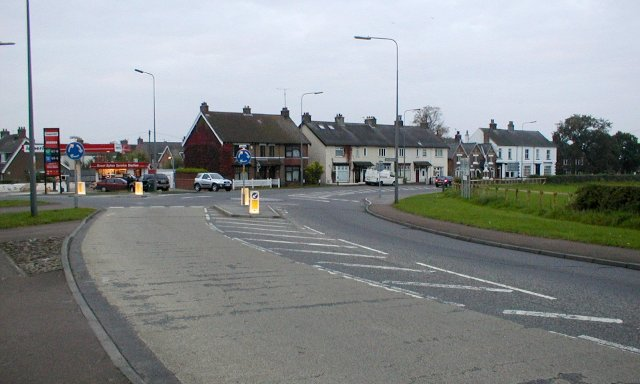
A173 Newton Road
