= Marton, Middlesbrough =

Area of Middlesbrough, North Yorkshire, England

Coordinates: 54.5372°N 1.2047°W

Marton: Marton-in-Cleveland
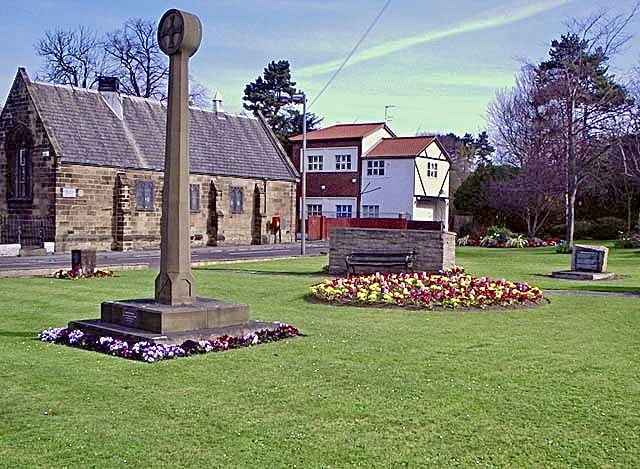
- Village green

- Location within North Yorkshire
- Population: 9,990
- OS grid reference: NZ515160
- Unitary authority: Middlesbrough
- Ceremonial county: North Yorkshire
- Region: North East
- Country: England
- Sovereign state: United Kingdom
- Post town: MIDDLESBROUGH
- Postcode district: TS7 & TS8
- Dialling code: 01642
- Police: Cleveland
- Fire: Cleveland
- Ambulance: North East
- UK Parliament: Middlesbrough South and East Cleveland

Marton or Marton-in-Cleveland is an area of Middlesbrough, North Yorkshire, England. Until the 1950s, it was a small village next to the hamlet of Tollesby in Yorkshire's North Riding.

The Marton parish originally stretched north to the River Tees, however with the expansion of Middlesbrough, the parish became progressively smaller, ultimately becoming a suburb of south Middlesbrough.

Attractions include Stewart Park, a large public park given by a former councillor, Dormund Stewart, to the people of Middlesbrough in 1928.

At the 2011 census, the Marton Ward (Marton East since 2015) had a population of 4,728 while Marton West Ward had a population of 5,305.

== James Cook ==
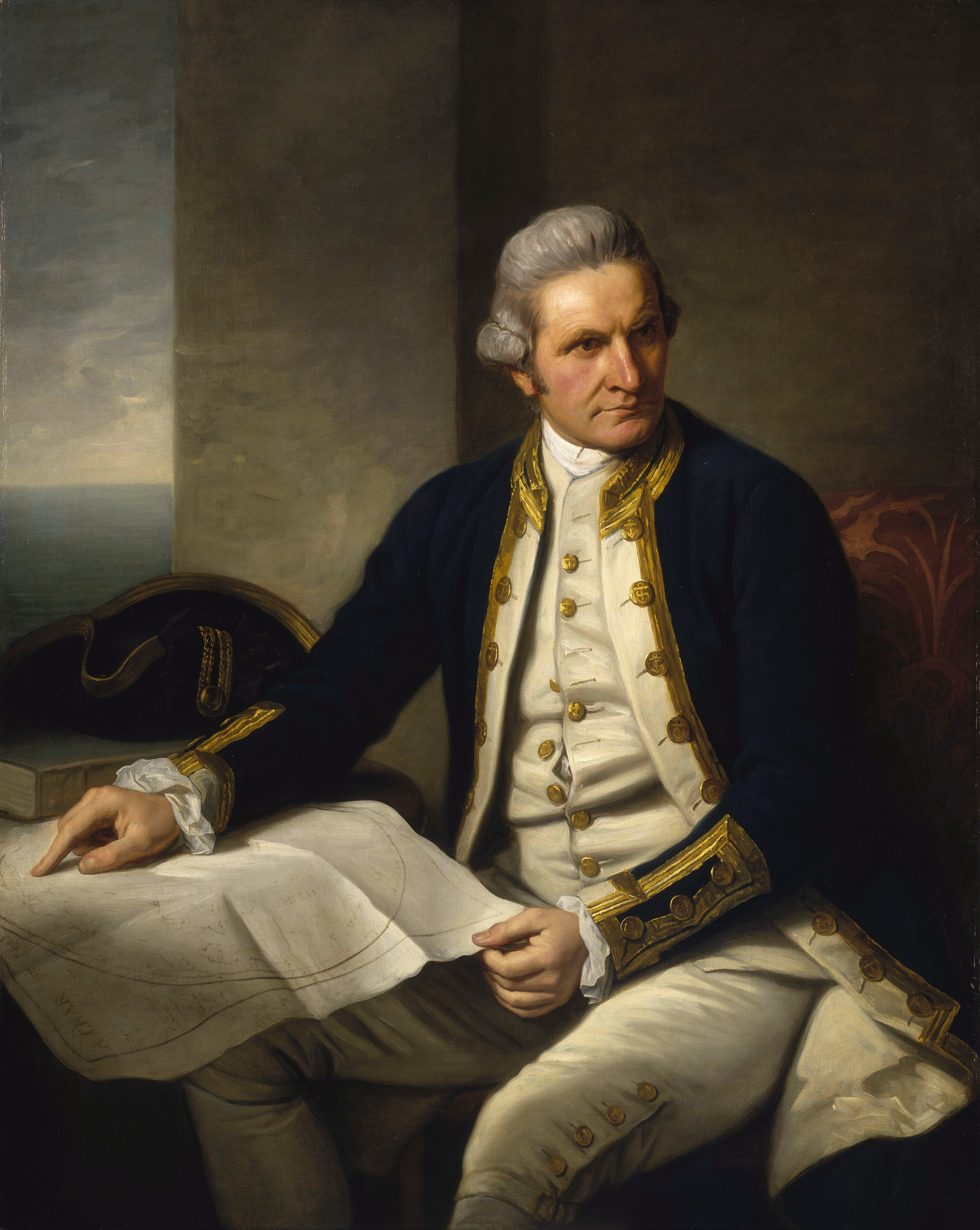
James Cook, portrait by Nathaniel Dance-Holland c. 1775, National Maritime Museum, Greenwich.

The explorer, cartographer and navigator, Captain James Cook was born to James and Grace Cook, in a clay-built cottage in the village of Marton in 1728, and he lived for a short time in the village, until the family moved to Great Ayton. A contemporary drawing of the village by George Cuit has revealed the cottage to have significantly deteriorated by as early as 1788, a precursor to it being levelled by new local landowner, Bartholomew Rudd, in the 1790s. It was very close to where the original manor house Marton Lodge eventually stood, to which Rudd made many alterations. Cook later sailed his ship (HMS Endeavour) from Whitby to discover and name for the western world the antipodean continents and islands as well as many islands in the Pacific Ocean.

== Namesakes ==
The tiny community of Marton, Queensland, Australia, upstream from Cooktown on the banks of the Endeavour River, was named after James Cook's birthplace in remembrance of his 7-week stay in the region in 1770. There is also a town in New Zealand named Marton (renamed thus in 1869 in honour of Cook's birthplace). The name of the Yorkshire village derives from a mixture of Old English and Old Norse (marr-tūn) which means Marsh farm/settlement.

== Stewart Park ==
In 1859, the ruin and the land that is now the park were bought by the Middlesbrough ironmaster H. W. F. Bolckow. He built a new hall, which, after serving for a short period of time as a museum, was destroyed during demolition by fire in 1960, after standing empty for several years. The site is now home to the Captain Cook Birthplace Museum, opened in 1978. In addition to viewing the large collection of Cook-related objects at the museum, visitors can view a grade II listed granite urn erected by Bolckow in 1858 on the site of the demolished Cook cottage.

== St Cuthbert's Church ==
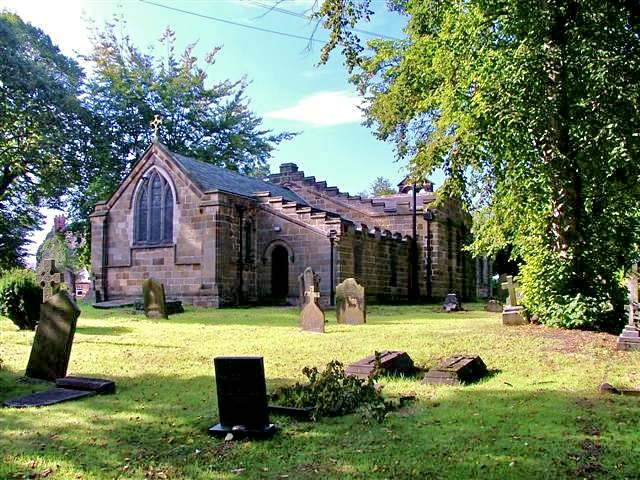
St Cuthbert's

There is no record of the foundation of St Cuthbert's Church, but there is evidence that it dates from the 12th century, in the Norman period. At that time the overlords of Marton were the de Brus family, ancestors of Robert the Bruce of Scotland. They had founded Gisborough Priory in 1119, and succeeding generations of the family bestowed gifts of land and property on this and other religious houses in the area. The church at Marton was one of those gifts to Guisborough, given before 1187.

In 1540 when the priory was dissolved by King Henry VIII, all the property belonging to the priory reverted to the Crown. In 1545 the living of Marton was granted to the Diocese of York, where it remains to this day.

In 1843 and 1847 a major refurbishment took place, mainly financed by J.B. Rudd of Tollesby Hall, the local squire. A later pen portrait in the Parish magazine tells us that the Church was "restored, widened, and lengthened so that it became, from a little whitewashed, flat ceilinged, sash-windowed, dilapidated edifice with only two aisles and one transept, into the present beautiful building".

Captain James Cook was baptised at St Cuthbert's Church. The church is now ornamented with a stained-glass window commemorating Cook.

The graves of Henry Bolckow and John Vaughan, the founding fathers of Bolckow Vaughan — the company which brought the steel industry to Middlesbrough – are in the churchyard. The graves, like the company, had been largely forgotten in the 20th century, but were refurbished in 2009.

== Governance ==
In 1961 the civil parish had a population of 4393. On 1 April 1968 the parish was abolished to form Teesside. Until 1974 it was in the North Riding of Yorkshire, from 1974 to 1996 it was in Cleveland.

=== 2023 local elections results for Marton East Ward ===
In the 2023 local elections, the following members were returned to Middlesbrough Borough Council:

Ward	Councillor	Party
Nunthorpe	Morgan McClintock	Liberal Democrats
Nunthorpe	Mieka Smiles	Conservatives

== Notable people ==
Other notable persons who lived in the parish of Marton include Bolckow's business partner John Vaughan (1799–1868), who lived at Gunnergate Hall until his death; Sir Raylton Dixon (1838–1901), a Middlesbrough shipbuilder; Henry Cochrane, an ironmaster; Agnes Spencer (died 1959), the wife of the founder of Marks and Spencer.

Marton is also the base for a junior football club, Marton F.C., which was founded in 1982 and for which Jonathan Woodgate (born 1980), David Wheater (born 1987) and Stewart Downing (born 1984), subsequent Middlesbrough F.C. professional footballers, once played.

== Education ==
Marton has three primary schools: Lingfield Primary School, Captain Cook Primary School and Marton Manor Primary School. There are no secondary schools in Marton. Most pupils go to nearby Nunthorpe School, the King's Academy, in Coulby Newham or Trinity Catholic College.

== Amenities ==
Marton shops in the evening

Marton Shops, a parade of local supermarkets, eateries, banks, pharmacy and various other outlets is located on the A172 (Stokesley Road). Marton Library & Community Hub is located on Laurel Road, just behind the shops.

Public houses include the Southern Cross and the Rudds Arms (both on the A172); the former is located adjacent to the A172 / Stainton Way crossroads and the latter close to the A172 / A174 interchange. The Marton Hotel and Country Club (closed October 2017) was located almost directly opposite to the Rudds Arms before being severely damaged and subsequently demolished in a large blaze in June 2019.

Marton Cricket Club (founded c.1853), located adjacent to the Rudds Arms, play in the North Yorkshire and South Durham Cricket League (NYSD) league. The club's pavilion includes a function room available for hire for occasions such as wedding receptions, birthdays, anniversaries, christenings and funerals etc.

== Transport ==
Marton is served by bus routes provided by Arriva North East 28, 28a, 29 that connect to Middlesbrough town centre.

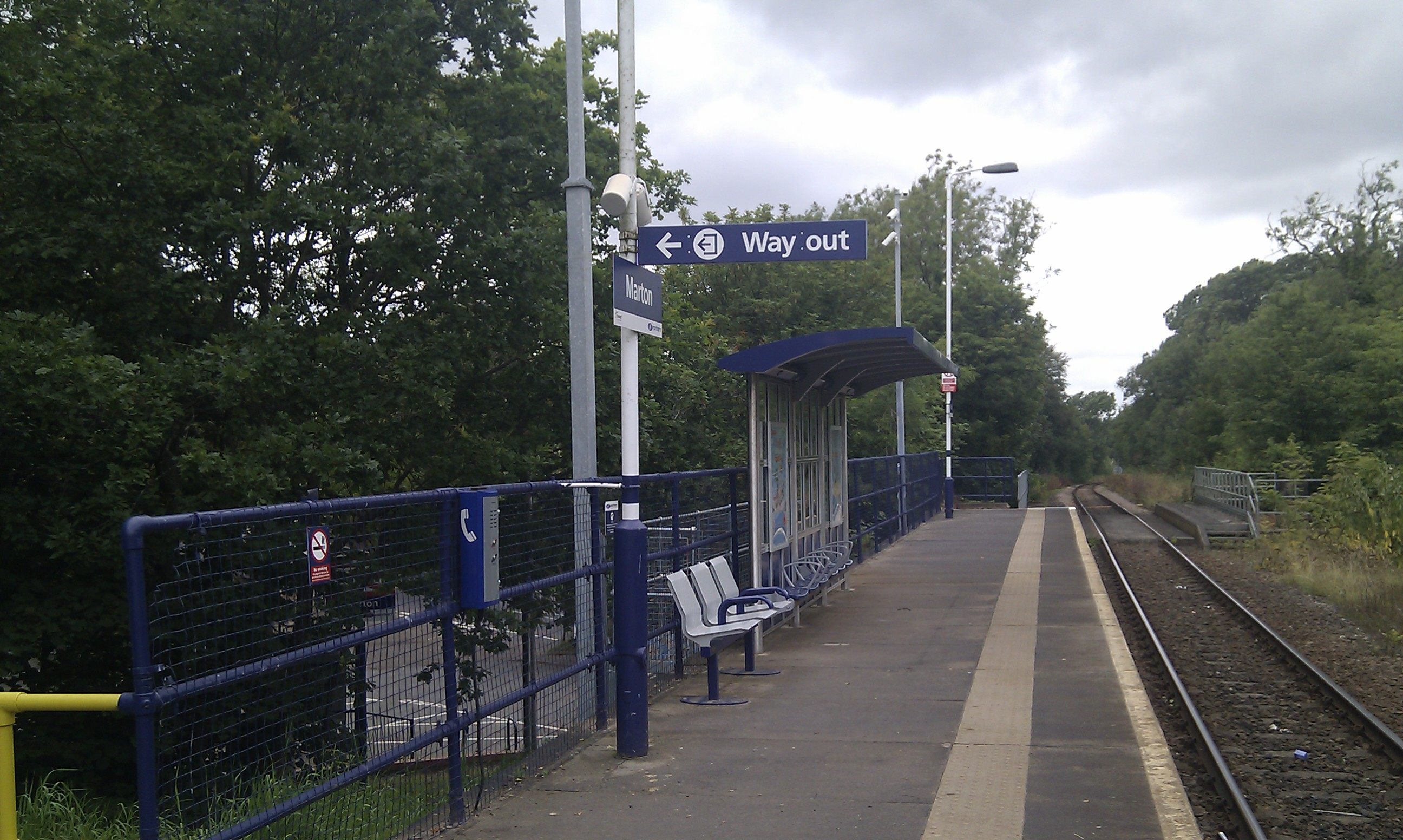
Marton Railway Station

Stations in the area are on the Esk Valley Line. Northern operate all services on the line, improvements to the timetable in 2014 meant up to 17 trains (each way) calling at both Marton and Gypsy Lane railway stations through the week, with a full hourly service being introduced in 2017 including on Sundays. Marton station is located further away to most Marton residents than Gypsy Lane and generally receives less patronage. Marton station is located just off the B1380 (Ladgate Lane), close to the entrance of Ormesby Hall whilst Gypsy Lane station is located approximately halfway along Gypsy Lane, accessed via Stainton Way or Guisborough Road depending on the direction of approach. Gypsy Lane is a no through road at the station.
