= A171 road =

Road in England

A171

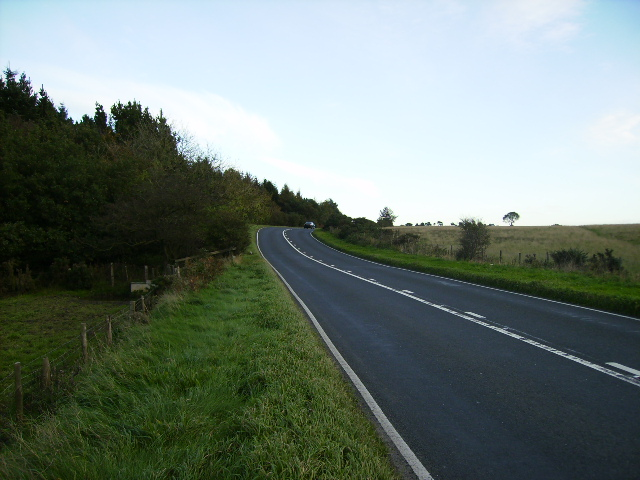

Route information
- Length: 48.1 mi (77.4 km)

Major junctions
- North end: Middlesbrough; 54.5748°N 1.2033°W
- A66 A174 A173 A169 A174 A165 A170; A64
- South end: Scarborough; 54.2804°N 0.4053°W

Location
- Country: United Kingdom
- Primary destinations: Whitby

Road network
- Roads in the United Kingdom; Motorways; A and B road zones
← A170	→ A172

The A171 is a road in England that runs between the North Yorkshire towns of Middlesbrough, and Scarborough, whilst also passing through the town of Whitby along the way. Other destinations which the road passes near to include Guisborough, and Robin Hood's Bay. Locally it is known as The Moor Road. The road is mostly single carriageway but has some sections of dual carriageway. The entire length of the road, from its beginning in Middlesbrough to its end in Scarborough is 48.1 miles (77.5 km).

== Description ==
The road starts on the A66 at Middlesbrough (North Ormesby) and heads south east through Ormesby to Nunthorpe where it turns east as a dual carriageway for 3.5 miles, before becoming a single carriageway again that bypasses Guisborough. Just outside Guisborough it heads into the North York Moors National Park (forming its boundary at first). After passing the village of Charltons, it rises up at a 15% incline through two 90° turns (the first east then the second south) up to Low Moor, this hill is named Birk Brow.

The road then wends its way through the open moorland of the North York Moors park past Scaling Dam and down into Whitby where it heads across Whitby new bridge. The bridge was built in 1980 at a projected cost of £1 million but the final amount was closer to £2 million.

The road then heads mostly in a south easterly direction out of Whitby bisecting Low & High Hawsker and then into open moorland again until it reaches the village of Cloughton where the national park ends. It then heads due south through Burniston and Scalby before finishing in Scarborough at a junction with the A64 on Falsgrave Road.

== Bus services ==
The route is served by Arriva bus service X93/X94. During the summer part of the timetable (which is the end of March to the start of November) the service, for most of the day, is one bus every half hour in each direction.

A Park and Ride facility was opened at the junction with the B1460 outside of Whitby in 2014. The park has space for 450 vehicles and buses run every 15 minutes to and from the town between the hours of 10 am and 7 pm.

== War monument ==
At the roundabout junction with the A169 is a monument to the first German aircraft shot down over England in the Second World War. Three Hawker Hurricane aircraft of 43 Squadron, RAF Acklington shot down a Heinkel He 111 at Bannial Flat Farm just north of what is now the two A roads junction.
