= Station Town =

Village and civil parish in County Durham, England

Coordinates: 54.7178°N 1.3685°W

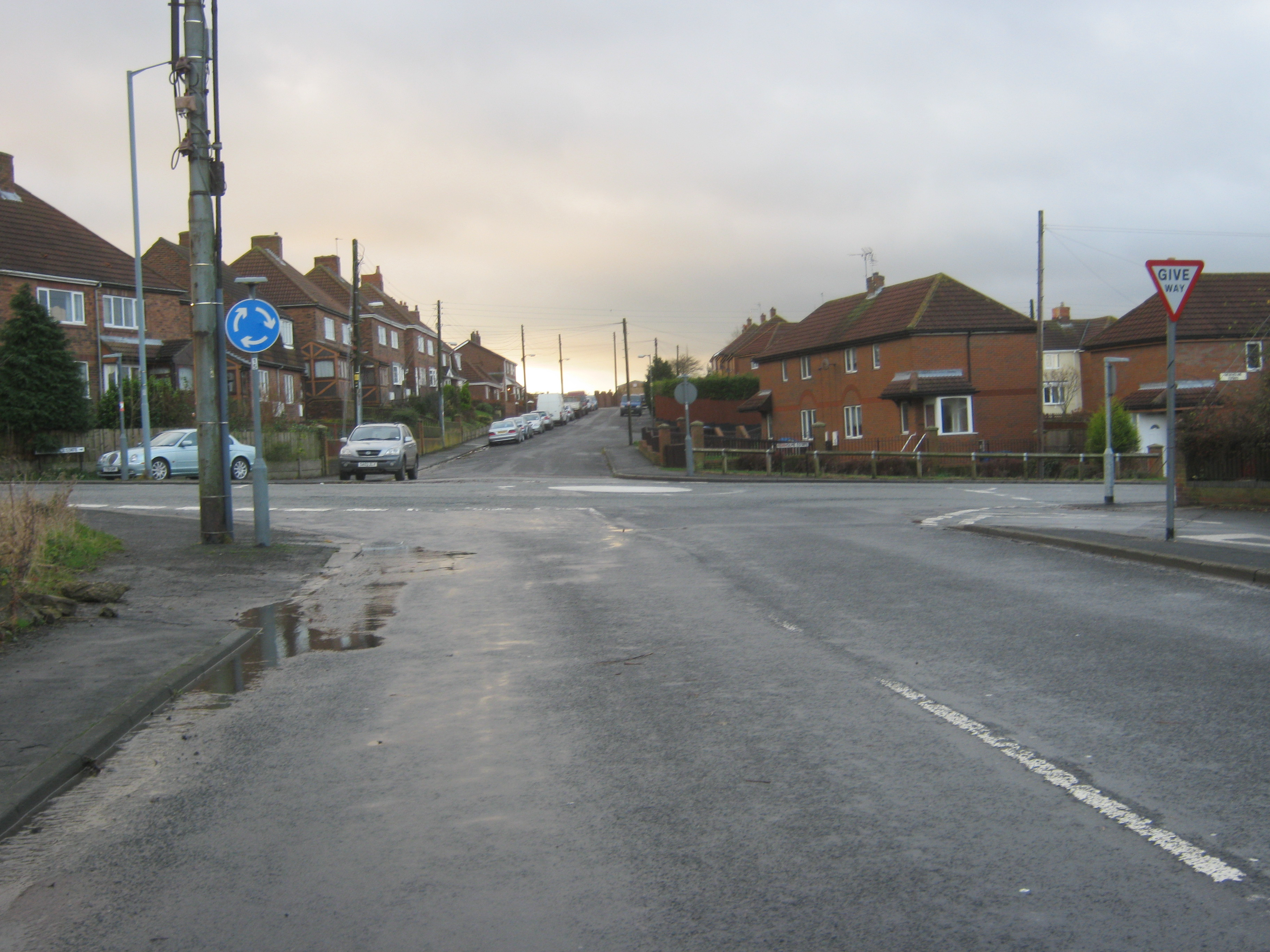

- Location within County Durham
- OS grid reference: NZ4036
- Civil parish: Hutton Henry and Station Town
- Unitary authority: County Durham
- Ceremonial county: County Durham
- Region: North East
- Country: England
- Sovereign state: United Kingdom
- Post town: WINGATE
- Postcode district: TS28
- Dialling code: 01429
- Police: Durham
- Fire: County Durham and Darlington
- Ambulance: North East
- UK Parliament: Easington

Station Town is a village in the civil parish of Hutton Henry and Station Town, in County Durham, England. It is situated to the south of Wingate, west of Hartlepool. Station Town is easily accessible, by road via the A19 and the B1280.

The village was apparently named after the former Wingate railway station, which was located at the north end of the village.
