= TS postcode area =

Postcode area within the United Kingdom

Cleveland
- Postcode area
- Coordinates: 54.585°N 1.222°W
- Country: United Kingdom
- Postcode area: TS
- Postcode area name: Cleveland
- Post towns: 10
- Postcode districts: 30
- Postcode sectors: 103
- Postcodes (live): 17,477
- Postcodes (total): 22,898
- Statistics as at May 2020

The TS postcode area, also known as the Cleveland postcode area, is a group of 29 postcode districts in northern England for ten post towns. These cover north-east North Yorkshire (post towns Middlesbrough, Redcar, Saltburn-by-the-Sea, Guisborough and Yarm) and south-east County Durham (post towns Stockton-on-Tees, Hartlepool, Billingham, Wingate and Trimdon Station).

The letters in the postcode are derived from Teesside, giving rise also to the unofficial label Teesside postcode area.

Mail for the TS postcode area is processed at Tyneside Mail Centre in Gateshead, along with mail for the DH, DL, NE and SR postcode areas.

== Coverage ==
The approximate coverage of the postcode districts:

Postcode district	Post town	Coverage	Local authority area(s)
TS1	MIDDLESBROUGH	Middlesbrough (town centre)	Middlesbrough
TS2	MIDDLESBROUGH	St Hilda's, Port Clarence	Middlesbrough, Stockton-on-Tees
TS3	MIDDLESBROUGH	Middlesbrough's east: Brambles Farm, Thorntree, Park End, North Ormesby, Berwick Hills	Middlesbrough
TS4	MIDDLESBROUGH	Middlesbrough's centre-east: Beechwood, Easterside, Grove Hill, Longlands, Prissick, Saltersgill	Middlesbrough
TS5	MIDDLESBROUGH	Middlesbrough's west: Acklam, Ayresome, Brookfield, Linthorpe, Whinney Banks	Middlesbrough
TS6	MIDDLESBROUGH	Eston, Grangetown, Normanby, Teesville, South Bank	Redcar and Cleveland
TS7	MIDDLESBROUGH	Middlesbrough's south-east: Marton, Nunthorpe, Ormesby	Middlesbrough, Redcar and Cleveland
TS8	MIDDLESBROUGH	Middlesbrough's south-west (Coulby Newham, Marton, Hemlington), Stainton, Thornton & Maltby	Middlesbrough, Stockton-on-Tees
TS9	MIDDLESBROUGH	Great Ayton, Stokesley	North Yorkshire
TS10	REDCAR	Redcar (town centre), Coatham, Dormanstown, Kirkleatham, Warrenby	Redcar and Cleveland
TS11	REDCAR	Marske, New Marske	Redcar and Cleveland
TS12	SALTBURN-BY-THE-SEA	Saltburn, Brotton, Skelton	Redcar and Cleveland
TS13	SALTBURN-BY-THE-SEA	Loftus, Skinningrove, Staithes	Redcar and Cleveland, North Yorkshire
TS14	GUISBOROUGH	Guisborough	Redcar and Cleveland
TS15	YARM	Yarm, Kirklevington, Hutton Rudby	Stockton-on-Tees
TS16	STOCKTON-ON-TEES	Aislaby, Eaglescliffe, Egglescliffe, Preston-on-Tees (village), Urlay Nook	Stockton-on-Tees
TS17	STOCKTON-ON-TEES	Ingleby Barwick, Thornaby	Stockton-on-Tees, Middlesbrough
TS18	STOCKTON-ON-TEES	Stockton's east: town centre, Hartburn, Grangefield, Oxbridge, Portrack	Stockton-on-Tees, County Durham
TS19	STOCKTON-ON-TEES	Stockton's west: Bishopsgarth, Elm Tree Farm, Fairfield, Hardwick, Newtown, Roseworth	Stockton-on-Tees
TS20	STOCKTON-ON-TEES	Norton	Stockton-on-Tees
TS21	STOCKTON-ON-TEES	Bishopton, Carlton, Long Newton, Redmarshall, Stillington, Thorpe Thewles, Sedgefield	Stockton-on-Tees, County Durham
TS22	BILLINGHAM	Billingham (West), Wolviston, Wynyard	Stockton-on-Tees
TS23	BILLINGHAM	Billingham (East)	Stockton-on-Tees
TS24	HARTLEPOOL	Hartlepool (town centre, marina, Stranton), the Headland	Hartlepool
TS25	HARTLEPOOL	Greatham, Owton, Rift House, Seaton Carew,	Hartlepool
TS26	HARTLEPOOL	Throston, West Park	Hartlepool
TS27	HARTLEPOOL	Blackhall Rocks, Blackhall Colliery, Castle Eden, Hesleden, High Hesleden, Hutton Henry	Hartlepool, County Durham
TS28	WINGATE	Wingate, Station Town	County Durham
TS29	TRIMDON STATION	Trimdon	County Durham

== Map ==
TS postcode area map, showing postcode districts in red and post towns in grey text, with links to nearby DH, DL, SR and YO postcode areas.

== See also ==
- Postcode Address File
- List of postcode areas in the United Kingdom
