= A172 road (England) =

Road in North Yorkshire, England

A172

Route information
- Length: 16.7 mi (26.9 km)

Major junctions
- North end: Middlesbrough; 54.5770°N 1.2287°W
- A19 A173 A171; A66 A174
- South end: Ingleby Arncliffe; 54.3859°N 1.3186°W

Location
- Country: United Kingdom
- Constituent country: England

Road network
- Roads in the United Kingdom; Motorways; A and B road zones
← A171	→ A173

The A172 is a major road in North Yorkshire, and the unitary authority of Middlesbrough, England. It runs from Ingleby Arncliffe to Middlesbrough. The road derives its adumbrated number from 1969 when a thoroughfare link connected South Teesside with the Lackenby Docks in Middlesbrough. Since further urban infrastructure development it has been extended into the North Yorkshire Moors, when it transforms into A174.

== Route ==
=== Marton Road ===
Marton Road is that part of the length of the A172 that links Middlesbrough to Ladgate Lane. In 1960 Middlesbrough County Borough Council identified a need for the imposition of a speed limit to control congestion in the city.

Marton Road itself runs from the centre of Middlesbrough, starting at around the site of the old St. John's Church and runs to Marton Crossroads at Ladgate Lane. Along its route the road passes several sites of local interest, including the James Cook University Hospital, and Stewart Park. The road can become congested and is famous locally for the "Marton Crawl" which happens during peak times. The Marton Crawl can take anything up to 20 minutes to get from Middlesbrough town centre to Marton itself. This section of the road has ten speed cameras.

=== Pannierman Lane ===
Pannierman Lane is that part of the road that is part of the Nunthorpe by-pass, and continues to Stokesley.

=== Stokesley Road ===
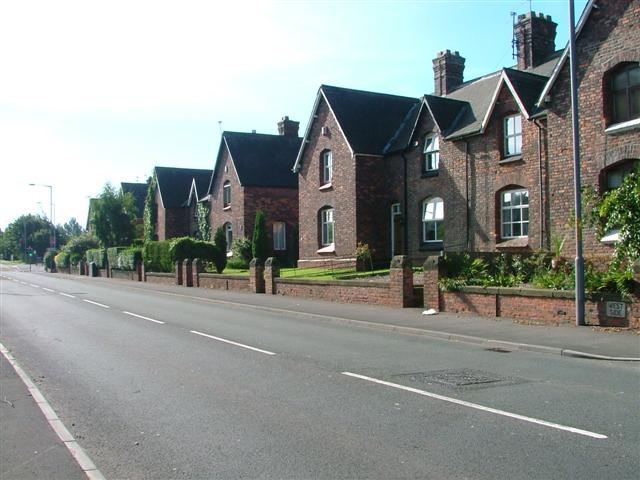
Cottages along the road

On 29 July 1963, The Transport Minister, Ernest Marples announced a new by-pass for the village of Stokesley. This was the origin of the link road. However the edited version of Hansard implies that the new Labour Government re-routed the proposal in 1965 making a Compulsory Purchase Order of the required land. The A172 changes its name to Stokesley Road at Marton Crossroads, passing through Marton-in-Cleveland. The road can be used to join the A19 north to Newcastle and Sunderland and south. The road also joins the A174 (at this point called the Parkway) to the coastal towns of Redcar, Saltburn and Whitby.

There are a number of bus services which operate along part or all of the road. Amongst these are: 27 (Marton-Netherfields), 28 (Saltburn), 29 (Stokesley) and 63 (Redcar), which are operated by Arriva North East.

In May 2016 a section of the road 1.5 miles (2.4 km) long by the Blue Bell Inn was re-surfaced by the Highways Authority at Coulby Newham.

=== Dixons Bank ===
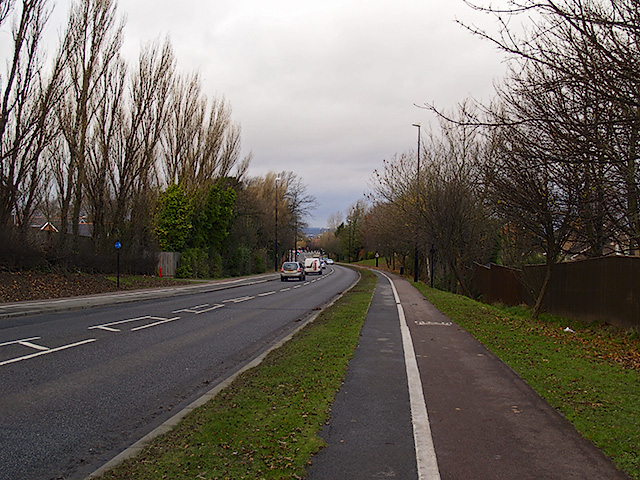
Dixons Bank in Nunthorpe

After the junction with Stainton Way, the name changes to Dixons Bank. As of December 2017 major road improvements are underway at a critical junction, Stainton Way in South Middlesbrough, which will widen access, increase traffic flow, increase highway drainage schemes, and improve street lighting.

The road heads south through the Cleveland Hills and Commondale before it joins the A19.
