= Tollesby =

Area of Middlesbrough, North Yorkshire, England

Coordinates: 54.534070°N 1.212290°W

- Suburb
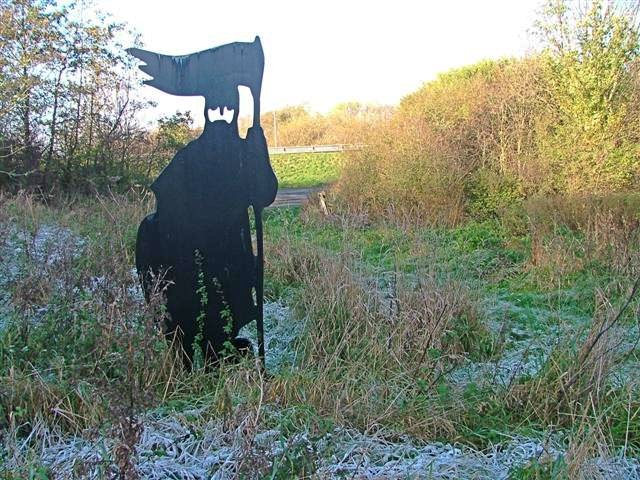
- Footpath near Tollesby with a Viking statue

- Location within North Yorkshire
- OS grid reference: NZ510157
- Unitary authority: Middlesbrough
- Ceremonial county: North Yorkshire
- Region: North East
- Country: England
- Sovereign state: United Kingdom
- Post town: MIDDLESBROUGH
- Postcode district: TS4, 7 & 8
- Police: Cleveland
- Fire: Cleveland
- Ambulance: North East

Tollesby is a residential area 3 miles (5 km) south of Middlesbrough, in the Ladgate Ward, North Yorkshire, England. It is south-east of the Middlesbrough Municipal Golf Course.

The area was previously a separate hamlet near Marton-in-Cleveland before being absorbed with Middlesbrough, with its neighbour. The local schools are Easterside Academy, Holmwood and St Thomas More Primary.

== Gallery ==
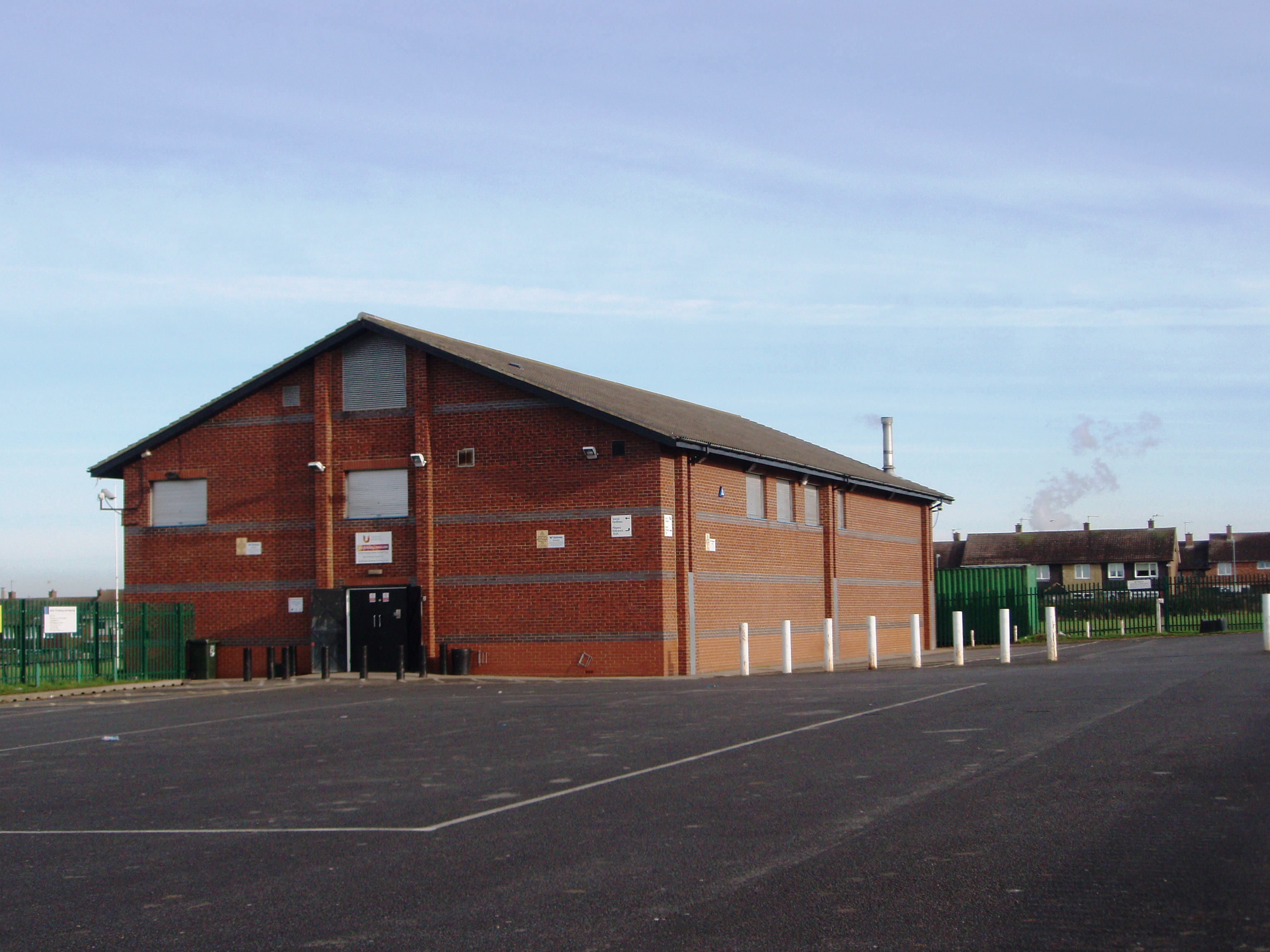
Site of the former Tollesby Farm, the current buildings on site are sport facilities

A sunset in Tollesby

A tree at a sunset in Tollesby

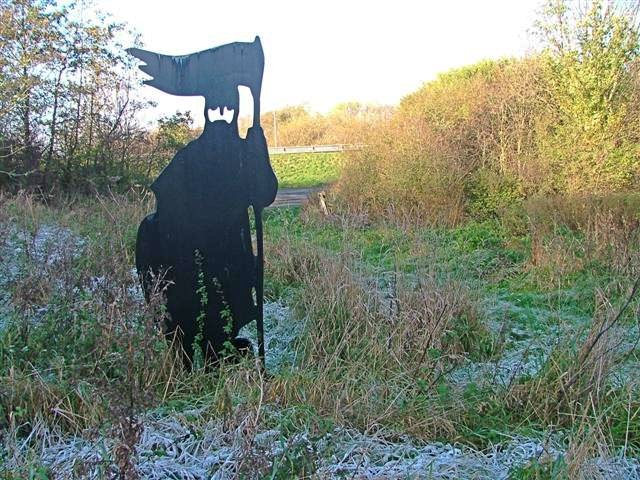
Viking sculpture denoting Tollesby's Viking origin
