= List of schools in Middlesbrough =

This is a list of schools in Middlesbrough, in the English county of North Yorkshire.

== State-funded schools ==
=== Primary schools ===
- Abingdon Primary School
- Acklam Whin Primary School
- Archibald Primary School
- The Avenue Primary School
- Ayresome Primary School
- Beech Grove Primary School
- Berwick Hills Primary School
- Brambles Primary Academy
- Breckon Hill Primary School
- Caldicotes Primary Academy
- Captain Cook Primary School
- Chandlers Ridge Academy
- Corpus Christi RC Primary School
- Easterside Academy
- Green Lane Primary Academy
- Hemlington Hall Academy
- Kader Academy
- Lingfield Primary School
- Linthorpe Community Primary School
- Marton Manor Primary School
- Newham Bridge Primary School
- Newport Primary School
- North Ormesby Primary Academy
- Pallister Park Primary School
- Park End Primary School
- Pennyman Primary Academy
- Rose Wood Academy
- Sacred Heart RC Primary School
- St Alphonsus' RC Primary School
- St Augustine's RC Primary School
- St Bernadette's RC Primary School
- St Clare's RC Primary School
- St Edward's RC Primary School
- St Gerard's RC Primary School
- St Joseph's RC Primary School
- St Puis X RC Primary School
- St Thomas More RC Primary School
- Sunnyside Academy
- Thorntree Academy
- Viewley Hill Academy
- Whinney Banks Primary School

=== Secondary schools ===
- Acklam Grange School
- The King's Academy
- Macmillan Academy
- Outwood Academy Acklam
- Outwood Academy Ormesby
- Outwood Academy Riverside
- Trinity Catholic College
- Unity City Academy

=== Special and alternative schools ===
- Beverley School
- Discovery Special Academy
- Hollis Academy
- Holmwood School
- Priory Woods School
- River Tees High Academy
- River Tees Middle Academy
- River Tees Primary Academy

=== Further education ===
- Middlesbrough College
- The Northern School of Art

== Independent schools ==
=== Special and alternative schools ===
- Hopefields Education CiC
- Keys Tees Valley College
- Reintegreat Education Solutions
