= List of schools in North Lincolnshire =

This is a list of schools in North Lincolnshire, England.

== State-funded schools ==
=== Primary schools ===
- Alkborough Primary School, Alkborough
- Althorpe and Keadby Primary School, Keadby
- Barton St Peter's CE Primary School, Barton-upon-Humber
- Belton All Saints CE Primary School, Belton
- Berkeley Junior School, Scunthorpe
- Bottesford Infant School, Bottesford
- Bottesford Junior School, Bottesford
- Bowmandale Primary School, Barton-upon-Humber
- Brigg Primary School, Brigg
- Broughton Primary School, Broughton
- Burton-upon-Stather Primary School, Burton upon Stather
- Bushfield Road Infant School, Scunthorpe
- Castledyke Primary School, Barton-upon-Humber
- Crosby Primary School, Scunthorpe
- Crowle Primary Academy, Crowle
- East Halton Primary School, East Halton
- Eastoft CE Primary School, Eastoft
- Enderby Road Infant School, Scunthorpe
- Epworth Primary Academy, Epworth
- Frodingham Infant School, Scunthorpe
- Goxhill Primary School, Barrow upon Humber
- The Grange Primary School, Scunthorpe
- Gunness and Burringham CE Primary School, Gunness
- Haxey CE Primary School, Haxey
- Hibaldstow Academy, Hibaldstow
- Holme Valley Primary School, Bottesford
- John Harrison CE Primary School, Barrow upon Humber
- Killingholme Primary School, South Killingholme
- Kirmington CE Primary School, Kirmington
- Kirton Lindsey Primary School, Kirton in Lindsey
- Leys Farm Junior School, Bottesford
- Lincoln Gardens Primary School, Ashby
- Luddington and Garthorpe Primary School, Luddington
- Messingham Primary School, Messingham
- New Holland CE and Methodist Primary School, New Holland
- Oakfield Primary School, Scunthorpe
- Oasis Academy Henderson Avenue, Scunthorpe
- Oasis Academy Parkwood, Scunthorpe
- Outwood Junior Academy Brumby, Scunthorpe
- Priory Lane Community School, Scunthorpe
- St Augustine Webster RC Academy, Scunthorpe
- St Barnabas CE Primary School, Barnetby le Wold
- St Bernadette's RC Primary Academy, Ashby
- St Martin's CE Primary School, Owston Ferry
- St Mary's RC Primary Academy, Brigg
- St Norbert's RC Primary Academy, Crowle
- St Peter and St Paul CE Primary School, Scunthorpe
- Scawby Academy, Scawby
- Scunthorpe CE Primary School, Scunthorpe
- South Ferriby Primary School, South Ferriby
- Ulceby St Nicholas CE Primary School, Ulceby
- West Butterwick CE Primary School, West Butterwick
- Westcliffe Primary School, Scunthorpe
- Westwoodside CE Academy, Westwoodside
- Willoughby Road Primary Academy, Scunthorpe
- Winteringham Primary School, Winteringham
- Winterton CE Infants' School, Winterton
- Winterton Junior School, Winterton
- Wootton St Andrew's CE Primary School, Wootton
- Worlaby Academy, Worlaby
- Wrawby St Mary's CE Primary School, Wrawby
- Wroot Travis CE Primary School, Wroot

=== Secondary schools ===
- The Axholme Academy, Crowle
- Baysgarth School, Barton-upon-Humber
- Engineering UTC Northern Lincolnshire, Scunthorpe
- Frederick Gough School, Bottesford
- Kirton Academy, Kirton in Lindsey
- Melior Community Academy, Scunthorpe
- Outwood Academy Brumby, Scunthorpe
- Outwood Academy Foxhills, Scunthorpe
- St Bede's Catholic Voluntary Academy, Scunthorpe
- St Lawrence Academy, Scunthorpe
- Sir John Nelthorpe School, Brigg
- South Axholme Academy, Epworth
- The Vale Academy, Brigg
- Winterton Community Academy, Winterton

=== Special and alternative schools ===
- Coritani Academy, Scunthorpe
- St Hugh's School, Scunthorpe
- St Luke's Primary School, Scunthorpe

=== Further education ===
- John Leggott College
- North Lindsey College
- Trent View College (SEND)

== Independent schools ==
=== Senior and all-through schools ===
- OneSchool Global UK, Scunthorpe

=== Special and alternative schools ===
- Act Fast NL, Messingham
- Demeter House, Brigg
- Options Barton, Barton-upon-Humber
- Robert Holme Academy, Brigg
- Rowan Education, Scunthorpe
- South Park Enterprise College, Scunthorpe
