= Middlesbrough bus station =

Bus station in North Yorkshire, England

Middlesbrough Bus Station
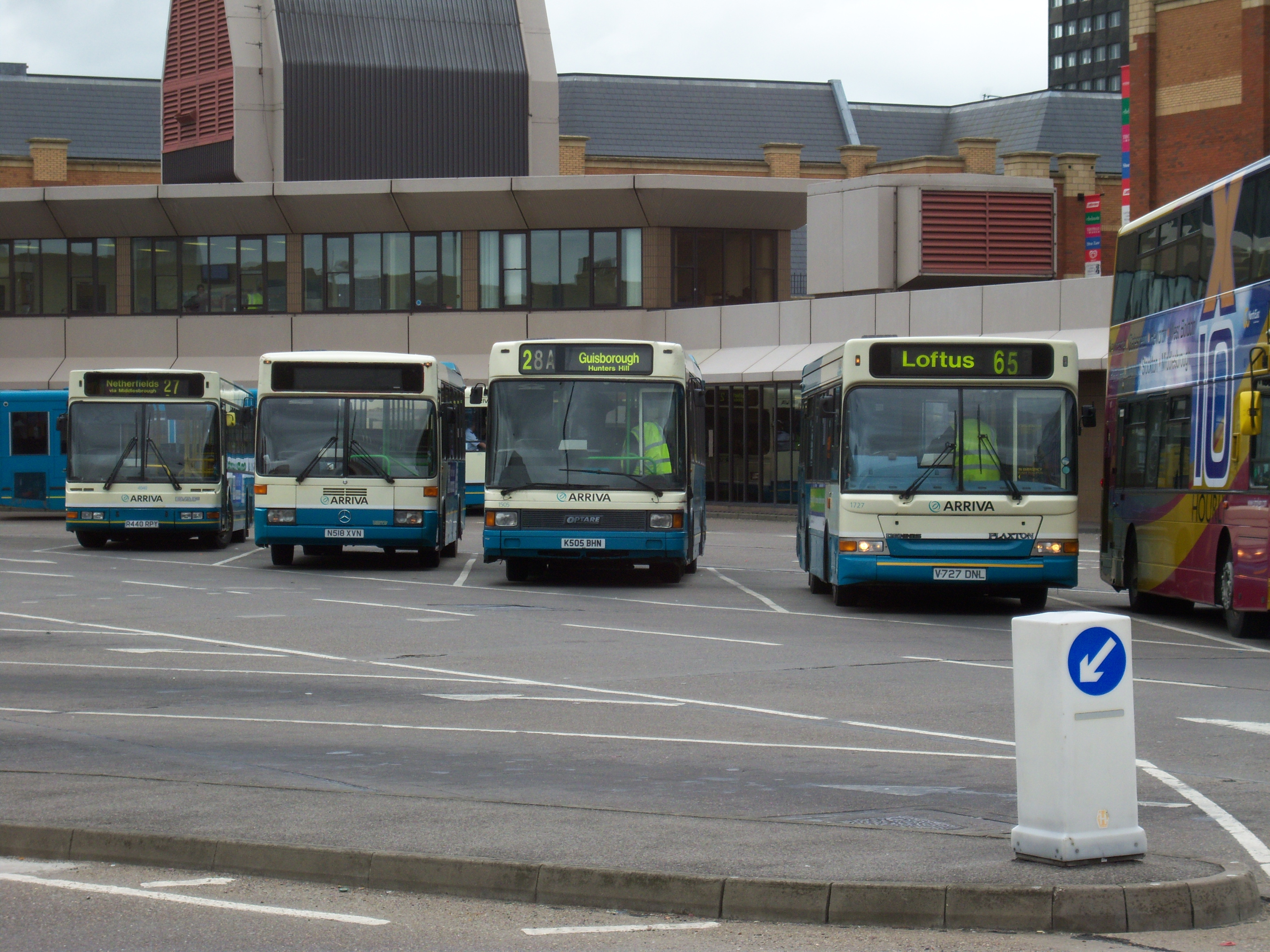
- Arriva buses at the bus station (2009)

General information
- Location: Middlesbrough, Borough of Middlesbrough, England
- Coordinates: 54°34′34″N 1°14′22″W
- Owner: Middlesbrough Borough Council
- Operator: Middlesbrough Borough Council
- Bus stands: 21
- Connections: Middlesbrough

History
- Opened: 1982
Location
- Location within North Yorkshire

Middlesbrough bus station serves the town of Middlesbrough, in North Yorkshire, England. It is located around 1/4 mi (400 m) from the town's railway station.

== History ==
It was opened in 1982, at a cost of £5.3 million, by the actress Pat Phoenix. It stands partly on the site of the previous bus station, which belonged to United Automobile Services.

From mid-July 2012, the bus station was partially closed for around six weeks, to allow for improvement work to take place – at a cost of around £1.5 million. Work was carried out in order to improve accessibility for disabled people, by creating low floor access at the majority of stops. Work was also undertaken to rebuild the main concourse and a partial reconstruction of the ramps.

In January 2024, Tees Valley Combined Authority announced a £15 million investment to refurbish the bus station.

=== Accidents and incidents ===
On 2 February 2015, an Arriva North East vehicle, which was operating service 28, collided with one of the bus station's south stands. There were no injuries, but significant damage was sustained to the building's roof and windows.

On 23 December 2021, an Arriva North East vehicle, which was out of service at the time, was shunted into the bus station's north stands by a Go North East coach. As above, there were no injuries, but damage was sustained to the building, as well as damage to the railings, roof and windows.

== Operators ==
Local services are provided predominantly by Arriva North East, Stagecoach North East and Go North East.

The key areas they serve include:

- Stagecoach services 36, 37 and 38 combine to provide up to six buses per hour to Teesside Park, Thornaby, Stockton-on-Tees and Norton, with an hourly extension to University Hospital of North Tees, and three buses per hour continuing to Billingham, Greatham and Hartlepool. The company also operates frequent services to Acklam, Coulby Newham, James Cook University Hospital, Hemlington and Park End.
- Arriva operates a number of local services, with destinations including Darlington, Guisborough, Ingleby Barwick, Redcar, Nunthorpe, Saltburn and Stokesley. The company also operates regional services X12 to Durham and Newcastle, and X93 to Guisborough, Whitby and Scarborough.
- Go North East operate the X10 express service to Peterlee, Dalton Park and Newcastle, using a fleet of four high-specification double-deck Alexander Dennis Enviro400 MMC vehicles, branded in a gold and purple livery.

== Services ==
The bus station has a total of 21 stands used for local services, with additional stands located on the upper floor for long-distance coach services operated by FlixBus and National Express.

As of September 2024, the stand allocation is:

Stand	Route	Destination
2	39	Park End via North Ormesby and Berwick Hills
3	62	Redcar via North Ormesby, Eston, Grangetown and Dormanstown
3	64	Grangetown via South Bank and Eston
3	64A	Normanby via South Bank and Eston
3	64B	Grangetown via South Bank, Normanby and Eston
3	101	Teesport via Berwick Hills, Ormesby, Normanby, Eston, South Bank and Grangetown
4	X2	New Marske express via Dormanstown, Redcar and Marske
4	X3	Lingdale express via Dormanstown, Redcar, Marske, Saltburn, Skelton and Boosbeck
4	X4	Whitby express via Dormanstown, Redcar, Marske, Saltburn, Brotton, Carlin How, Loftus, Easington, Staithes, Hinderwell, Runswick Bay and Sandsend
4	X4A	Whitby express via Dormanstown, Redcar, Marske, Saltburn, Brotton, Carlin How, Loftus, Easington, Staithes, Hinderwell, Runswick Bay and Sandsend
6	28	Guisborough via James Cook University Hospital, Easterside, Marton Manor, Marton and Nunthorpe
6	28A	Stokesley via James Cook University Hospital, Easterside, Marton Manor, Marton, Nunthorpe and Great Ayton
6	28B	Stokesley via James Cook University Hospital, Easterside, Marton Manor, Marton, Nunthorpe and Great Ayton
6	29	Marton (Note: Evening & Sunday journeys continue to Nunthorpe.) via Linthorpe, Saltersgill, James Cook University Hospital, Easterside and Marton Manor
7	63	Redcar via Linthorpe, James Cook University Hospital, Marton, Ormesby, Normanby and Eston
8	5	Easington via North Ormesby, Ormesby, Nunthorpe, Guisborough, Skelton, New Skelton, North Skelton, Brotton, Carlin How, Liverton Mines (Note: Alternate journeys operate via Liverton Mines.) and Loftus
8	5A	Guisborough via North Ormesby, Ormesby, Nunthorpe and Boosbeck
9	9	Ormesby via North Ormesby, Berwick Hills and Park End
9	X93	Scarborough express via Ormesby, Guisborough, Scaling Dam, Aislaby, Whitby, High Hawsker, Robin Hood's Bay, Fylingthorpe and Cloughton
9	X94	Scarborough express via Ormesby, Guisborough, Scaling Dam, Aislaby, Whitby, High Hawsker, Robin Hood's Bay, Fylingthorpe and Cloughton
10	8	Netherfields via North Ormesby and Berwick Hills
12	16	Ingleby Barwick via Teesside Park and Thornaby
12	17	Ingleby Barwick via Linthorpe, Acklam and Thornaby
12	17A	Stockton-on-Tees via Linthorpe, Acklam and Thornaby
12	17B	Stockton-on-Tees via Linthorpe, Acklam and Thornaby
13	10	Coulby Newham via James Cook University Hospital, Easterside and Marton Manor
13	13	Coulby Newham via Linthorpe, Acklam, Stainton and Hemlington
13	13B	Acklam
13	14	Acklam
14	12	Coulby Newham via Linthorpe, Acklam and Hemlington
15	RP1	Middlesbrough College
16	36	Hartlepool via Teesside Park, Thornaby, Stockton-on-Tees, Norton, Billingham and Greatham
16	36A	Hartlepool via Teesside Park (Note: Some journeys omit Teesside Park.), Thornaby, Stockton-on-Tees, Norton, Billingham, Wynyard and Greatham
16	37	University Hospital of North Tees via Teesside Park, Thornaby, Stockton-on-Tees, Norton and Hardwick
16	38	Norton via Teesside Park, Thornaby and Stockton-on-Tees
17	831	Hawes; DalesBus via Stockton-on-Tees, Darlington, Blackwell, Middleton Tyas, Skeeby, Richmond, Hudswell, Grinton, Reeth, Low Row, Gunnerside and Muker
17	X66	Darlington express via Stockton-on-Tees
17	X67	Darlington express via Stockton-on-Tees
18	X12	Newcastle express via Teesside Park, Stockton-on-Tees, Hardwick, Sedgefield, Coxhoe, Bowburn, Shincliffe, Durham, Framwellgate Moor, Plawsworth, Chester-le-Street, Birtley, Low Fell and Gateshead
18	X22	Peterlee express via Stockton-on-Tees, Hardwick, Segdefield, Fishburn, Trimdon, Deaf Hill, Station Town and Wingate
19	59	University Hospital of North Tees via Thornaby, Stockton-on-Tees and Hardwick
19	X10	Newcastle express via Stockton-on-Tees, Norton, Billingham, Peterlee, Dalton Park, Heworth and Gateshead
20	1	High Throston via Haverton Hill, The Clarences, Seaton Carew and Hartlepool
20	13	Newham Grange via Stockton-on-Tees and Fairfield
21	34	Low Grange via Billingham
