= Outwood Grange Academies Trust =

Multi-academy trust in England

- Formation: April 19, 2009; 17 years ago
- Type: Multi-academy trust
- Purpose: Education
- Headquarters: Wakefield, England, United Kingdom
- Coordinates: 53.70895°N 1.51292°W
- CEO: Lee Wilson
- Website: outwood.com

Outwood Grange Academies Trust (OGAT) is a multi-academy trust (MAT) that operates 41 schools (28 secondary and 13 primary) across northern England and the East Midlands. It is an exempt charity, regulated by the Department for Education. Its chief executive is Lee Wilson.

The trust was founded in 2009, led by Sir Michael Wilkins who was principal of the trust's namesake, Outwood Grange Academy. Its CEO, from 2016 to 2023, was Sir Martyn Oliver, who previously served as a principal of schools within the trust.

The trust operates using an "80:20" principle, where about 80% of how its schools operate is standardised and 20% is open to local innovation.

== Windfall ==
In 2015, the Conservative Education Minister, Nicky Morgan, announced she was giving five multi-academy trusts, including Outwood Grange Academies Trust, a million pounds each for "improving performance for pupils in some of the most challenging and disadvantaged areas of the country". The money was awarded to raise standards in deprived areas in South Yorkshire, Bradford, Greater Manchester, Northumberland and Tees Valley. The Northern Powerhouse minister said, James Wharton said, "'experience, leadership, and the chains' strong track record of success' will mean northern school children can now fulfil their potential." It was pointed out at the time that Sir headteacher Michael Wilkins had been previously criticised for taking £500,000 consultancy fees over and above his salary; then a financial audit by Wakefield Council reportedly uncovered an "excessive rewards culture" with lavish spending on foreign trips. Payments to Wilkins had been investigated by the council in 2011.

== Academic performance ==
In July 2016, a report by the Education Policy Institute found that at the secondary level "Outwood Grange is the best large academy group (10 schools or more)". In the multi-academy trust league tables released January 2017, the trust was ranked in the top 5 nationally for secondary progress, and also for both primary writing and maths progress.

== Discipline ==
The academy trust operates a zero tolerance discipline policy with children internally isolated and sent home for any breach of the uniform code as well as serious offences. In September 2018 The Guardian published an article criticising the use of isolation booths as a form of punishment within schools, describing them as a form of internal exclusion (in this context, exclusion is a policy where pupils are forbidden from attending school for a period of time as punishment).

A report from the Department for Education, highlighted in an August 2018 article in The Guardian, revealed that 45 schools in England had excluded over 20% of their pupils in 2016-2017. Outwood Grange was stated to run nine of them, with Outwood Academy Ormesby in Middlesbrough excluding 41% of pupils in the last academic year. Notes were drawn in the earlier article to the risk of disabled pupils with challenging behaviour being overly at risk of exclusion. The trusts' policy for "consequence rooms", as isolation booths were called, stated pupils must not "tap, chew, swing on their chairs, shout out, sigh, or [engage in] any other unacceptable or disruptive behaviour" and a spokesperson stated "The trust employs all reasonable adjustments for students with special needs within their behaviour policy". However, the banned activities include many self-stimulatory behaviours used by people on the autism spectrum to cope when under stress, and would be considered reasonable adjustments under the Equality Act 2010.

A parent of a child who was placed in a "consequence room" for 35 school days has taken a Yorkshire school to court to challenge the legitimacy of this policy; lawyers have applied for a judicial review. The issues to be judged are to be loss of education, the lack of a review procedure, and the lack of monitoring by the Department of Education which is now responsible as academies are free of Local Authority oversight. The trust has been accused of failure to promote the pupil's welfare and doing so in an "irrational" manner, as well as failure to have regard to the Equality Act 2010, as pupils with special educational needs or poor mental health are being placed in isolation against their best interests. To add, failure to comply with article 8 of the European Convention of Human Rights. The school trust responded saying "other of their schools were outstanding".

In September 2019, the trust launched a new behaviour policy. Schools Week reported that the new policy included "more praise, a further safeguard to pick up – and provide support for – those pupils stuck on the "merry go round" of sanctions, and more teaching for pupils about how to behave."

In 2019 former teachers at Outwood Academy Bishopsgarth reported a practice of intimidating and humiliating assemblies, which the trust denied; other teachers reported that these assemblies were trust policy and took place at other schools in the trust.

On 1 May 2019, the trust announced its intention that pupils will have to repeat a year, and be separated from their peer group, if their behaviour is deemed inadequate. The trust said that this is legal, and that no extra support is being provided for the students in spite of a warning that this type of zero tolerance creates child mental health problems and violence against teachers.

== Schools ==
=== Primary ===
- Outwood Junior Academy Brumby, Scunthorpe
- Outwood Primary Academy Alne, Easingwold
- Outwood Primary Academy Bell Lane, Pontefract
- Outwood Primary Academy Darfield, Barnsley
- Outwood Primary Academy Greenhill, Wakefield
- Outwood Primary Academy Greystone, Ripon
- Outwood Primary Academy Kirkhamgate, Wakefield
- Outwood Primary Academy Ledger Lane, Wakefield
- Outwood Primary Academy Littleworth Grange, Barnsley
- Outwood Primary Academy Lofthouse Gate, Wakefield
- Outwood Primary Academy Newstead Green, Wakefield
- Outwood Primary Academy Park Hill, Wakefield
- Outwood Primary Academy Woodlands, Doncaster

=== Secondary ===
- Outwood Academy Acklam, Middlesbrough
- Outwood Academy Adwick, Doncaster
- Outwood Academy Bishopsgarth, Stockton-on-Tees
- Outwood Academy Brumby, Scunthorpe
- Outwood Academy Bydales, Redcar
- Outwood Academy Carlton, Barnsley
- Outwood Academy City, Sheffield
- Outwood Academy City Fields, Wakefield
- Outwood Academy Danum, Doncaster
- Outwood Academy Easingwold, Easingwold
- Outwood Academy Foxhills, Scunthorpe
- Outwood Academy Freeston, Wakefield
- Outwood Academy Hasland Hall, Chesterfield
- Outwood Academy Haydock, Haydock
- Outwood Academy Hemsworth, Wakefield
- Outwood Academy Hindley, Hindley
- Outwood Academy Kirkby, Kirkby-in-Ashfield
- Outwood Academy Newbold, Chesterfield
- Outwood Academy Normanby, Middlesbrough
- Outwood Academy Ormesby, Middlesbrough
- Outwood Academy Portland, Worksop
- Outwood Academy Redcar, Redcar
- Outwood Academy Ripon, Ripon
- Outwood Academy Riverside, Middlesbrough
- Outwood Academy Shafton, Barnsley
- Outwood Academy Valley, Worksop
- Outwood Alternative Provision Eston, Middlesbrough
- Outwood Grange Academy, Wakefield

== Sources ==
- "Outwood Grange Academies Trust". get-information-schools.service.gov.uk. Department for Education.
