= Mornington High School =

Mornington High School is a former name of:

- Mornington Secondary College, Victoria, Australia
- Outwood Academy Hindley, Greater Manchester, UK
