= Bishopsgarth =

Area of Stockton, County Durham, England

Coordinates: 54.578°N 1.359°W

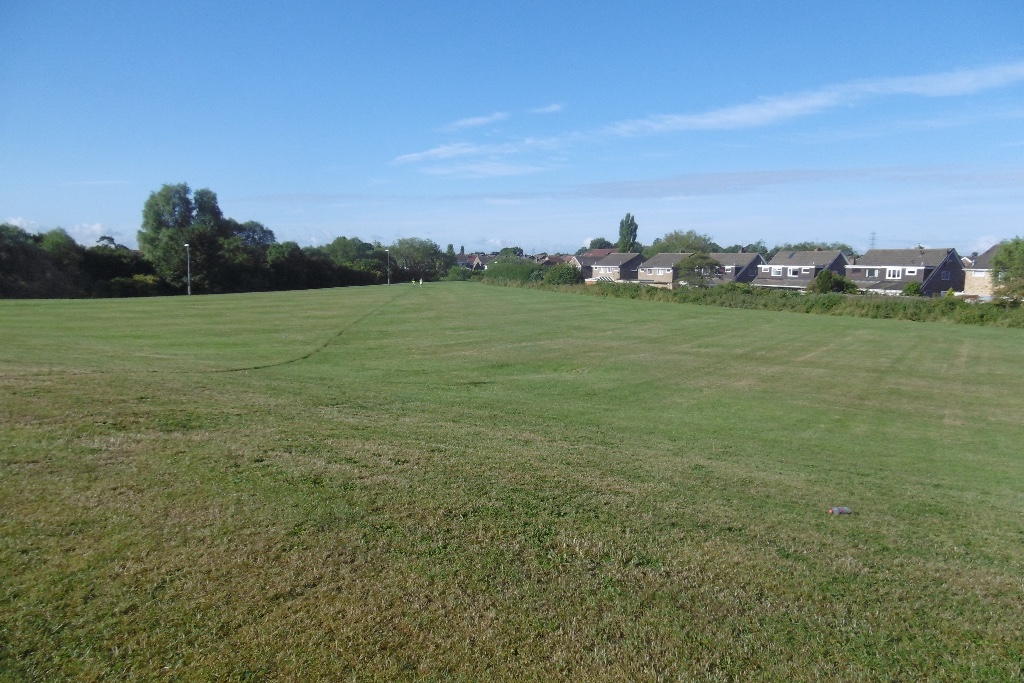
- Bishopsgarth Park

- Location within County Durham
- OS grid reference: NZ415205
- Unitary authority: Stockton-on-Tees
- Ceremonial county: County Durham
- Region: North East
- Country: England
- Sovereign state: United Kingdom
- Post town: STOCKTON-ON-TEES
- Postcode district: TS19
- Police: Cleveland
- Fire: Cleveland
- Ambulance: North East

Bishopsgarth is a west Stockton area in the borough of Stockton-on-Tees, County Durham, England. It is part of Bishopsgarth and Elm Tree Ward, which had a population of 6,689 in the 2011 census. It is near Hardwick and Fairfield. The area has a shopping parade and the Outwood Academy Bishopsgarth.

== See also ==
- Bishop Auckland
- Diocese of Durham
