= Outwood Academy Hasland Hall =

Location
- Broomfield Avenue; Chesterfield, Derbyshire, S41 0LP; England; 53°13′06″N 1°24′23″W

Information
- Type: Academy
- Established: Monday 11 January 1932
- Local authority: Derbyshire
- Trust: Outwood Grange Academies Trust
- Department for Education URN: 148337 Tables
- Ofsted: Reports
- Head of School: Ian Cooper
- Gender: Co-educational
- Age: 11 to 16
- Enrolment: 861
- Website: https://www.haslandhall.outwood.com/

Outwood Academy Hasland Hall (formerly Hasland Hall Community School) is a co-educational secondary school situated in Hasland, a village in Chesterfield, Derbyshire, England.

The school provides education from years 7 to 11 (ages 11–16).

== History ==
The main building was residence to Mr Bernard Lucas J.P. and later of Mr Charles Markham J.P. The building (now the Old Hall) was later converted into a school. The surrounding fields were utilized for all activities.

It was with the sale of Hasland Hall Mansion House with cottages, farm buildings and lands in 1924 that the first steps towards the school were taken. The second step was taken in 1931 when the Hall itself and surrounding gardens and parkland, approximately 12¾ acres (5.2 ha) in all, was sold to the Mayor, Alderman and Burgesses of the Borough of Chesterfield.

In spite of difficulties and delays due to weather, senior boys and girls commenced their studies in the Secondary Modern School at Hasland Hall on Monday 11 January 1932. Mr B. C. Boden moved with the children from the headship of the Church of England School on The Green to be Headmaster of the new school. He was assisted by eight members of staff, these being Mr A. E. Pountain, Mr E. H. Simmons, Misses C. Beach, M. Heath, M. Stanley, P. Wildin, Mr O. J. Tonks and Miss Greenwood (part-time). Each class was limited to 40 scholars, and the practical work classes to 20. The school accommodated for 288, and 280 scholars attended on the first day.

Prior to the school opening, alterations had been carried out on the Hall resulting in classrooms with much of the original building left. The cost of the Hall and site, including the lodge where the caretaker resided was £4,500. The contract price amounted to £5,600.

Over the years the school has undergone many alterations, including a project which was started in 1992. This consisted of several new classrooms, six science laboratories, a sports hall with changing rooms and showers, a reception foyer and two courtyards. It also included a dining hall which was also to cater for the pupils of Hasland Junior School.

In 1992, the school opened a new building with many classrooms. The temporary buildings that surrounded the main hall were demolished. The new block of classrooms became the main Hasland Hall building. It included 12 classrooms, 6 science laboratories, 2 I.C.T. suites, 2 art rooms, a cookery room, a woodwork room, a library, a main entrance and several offices.

Due to more houses being built in Hasland and the surrounding areas, the school still didn't have enough room. Because of this, temporary blocks were built, creating 14 new classrooms.

On 6 September 2006, the block of 5 classrooms were opened. This set of 5 classrooms would be the languages rooms. Four of these rooms (rooms 26, 27, 28 and 30) have interactive whiteboards, and there are some laptops to be used. The laptops arrived in the new block on 23 February 2007, after several weeks of preparation of the laptops for use. The introducing of laptops to the school has also taken place in the English department and Science department. With these pieces of technology, students are able to take part in activities with others, access the internet, and use the internet to learn.

On 3 February 2009, Hasland Hall closed its doors due to snow. It was the first time recorded in the history of the school. Hasland Junior School and Hasland Infant School also closed due to the snow, for the first time. A total of 130 schools in Chesterfield closed due to the snow

Hasland Hall was subject to an Ofsted inspection was September 2015, where it was rated a Good School. Ofsted inspected the school again in October 2019, and the results show the school to be inadequate.

In July 2019 the staff of Hasland Hall went on strike. NASUWT (https://www.nasuwt.org.uk/) stated, 'This action is as a result of the failure of the Employer to respond to the deep concerns of teachers about adverse management practices at the school which are negatively impacting on their wellbeing and working conditions'. Another strike, on 22 October, took place for the failure of these concerns to properly dealt with.

Previously a community school administered by Derbyshire County Council, in March 2021 Hasland Hall Community School converted to academy status and was renamed Outwood Academy Hasland Hall. The school is now sponsored by Outwood Grange Academies Trust.
