= Hardwick, County Durham =

Area of Stockton, County Durham, England

Coordinates: 54.586°N 1.354°W

Hardwick
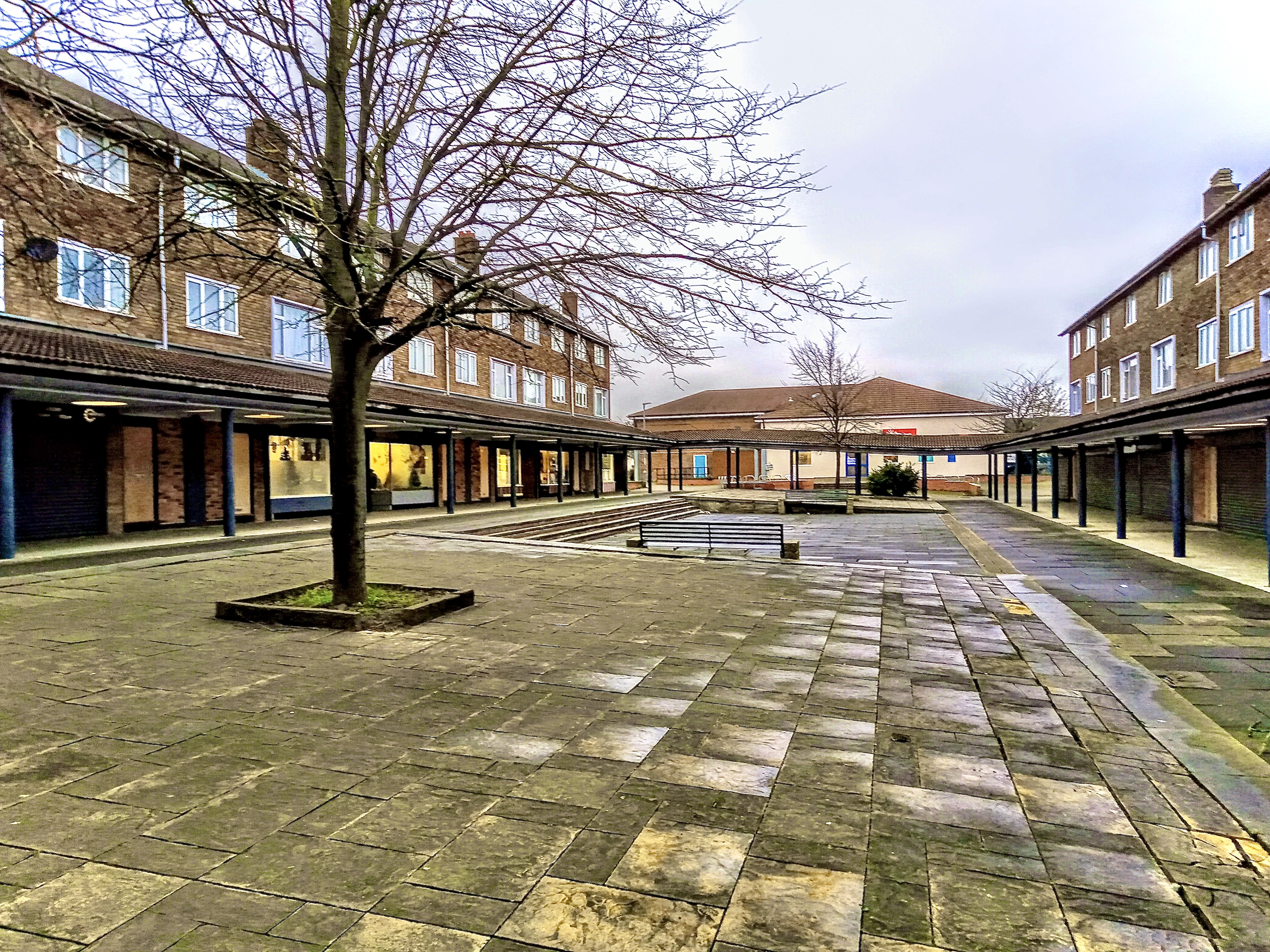
- Hardwick shops

- Location within County Durham
- Population: 7,500 (2011.Ward)
- OS grid reference: NZ418214
- Unitary authority: Stockton-on-Tees
- Ceremonial county: County Durham
- Region: North East
- Country: England
- Sovereign state: United Kingdom
- Post town: STOCKTON-ON-TEES
- Postcode district: TS19
- Police: Cleveland
- Fire: Cleveland
- Ambulance: North East

Hardwick is a west Stockton-on-Tees area in the borough of Stockton-on-Tees, County Durham, northern England. It is where North Tees Hospital is situated. The Hardwick ward had 6,881 population in the 2011 census.

It is bordered by Harrowgate Lane to the north west, Roseworth to the east and Bishopsgarth and Elm Tree Farm the south. The University Hospital of North Tees (formerly North Tees General Hospital) is in the area.

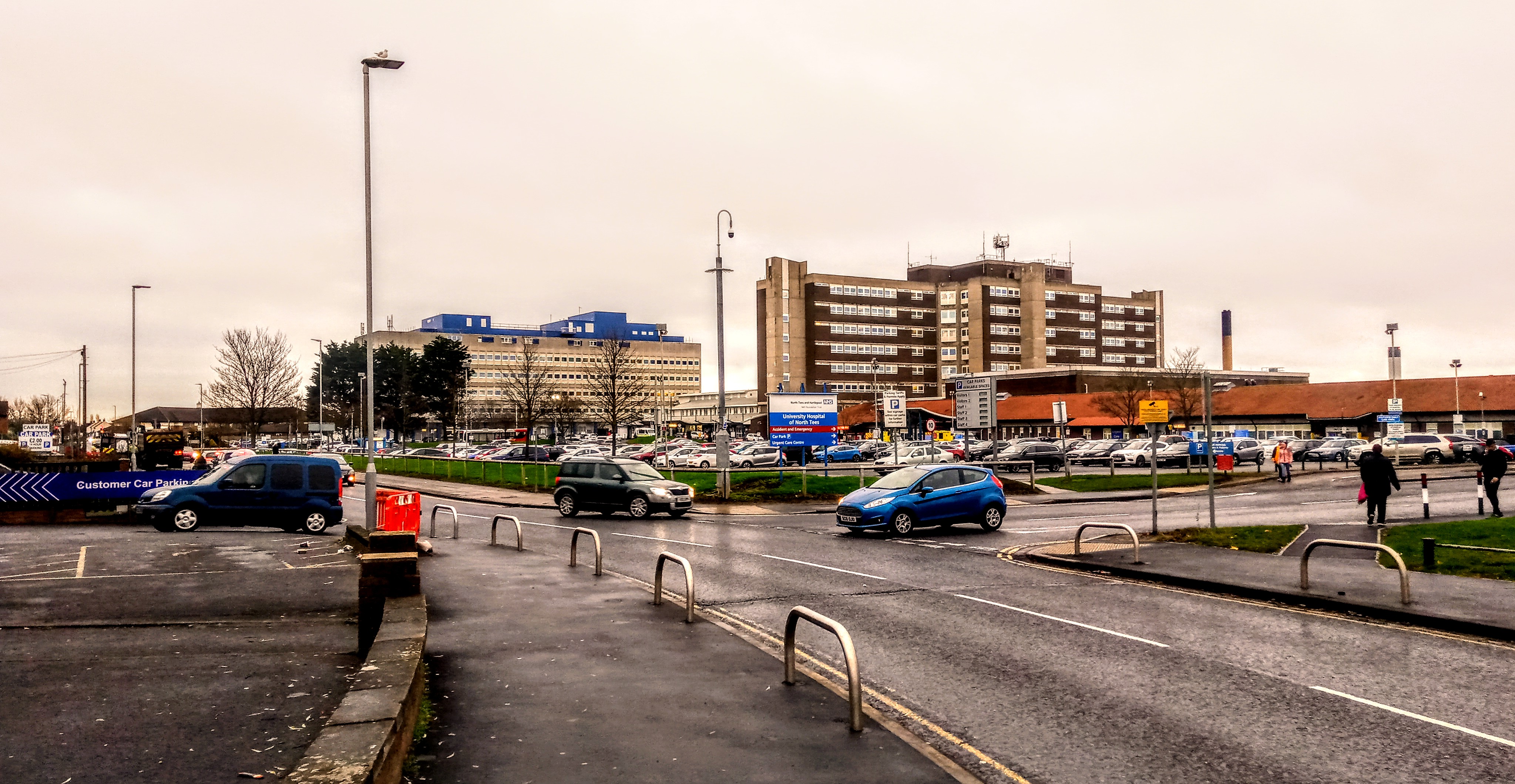
University Hospital of North Tees

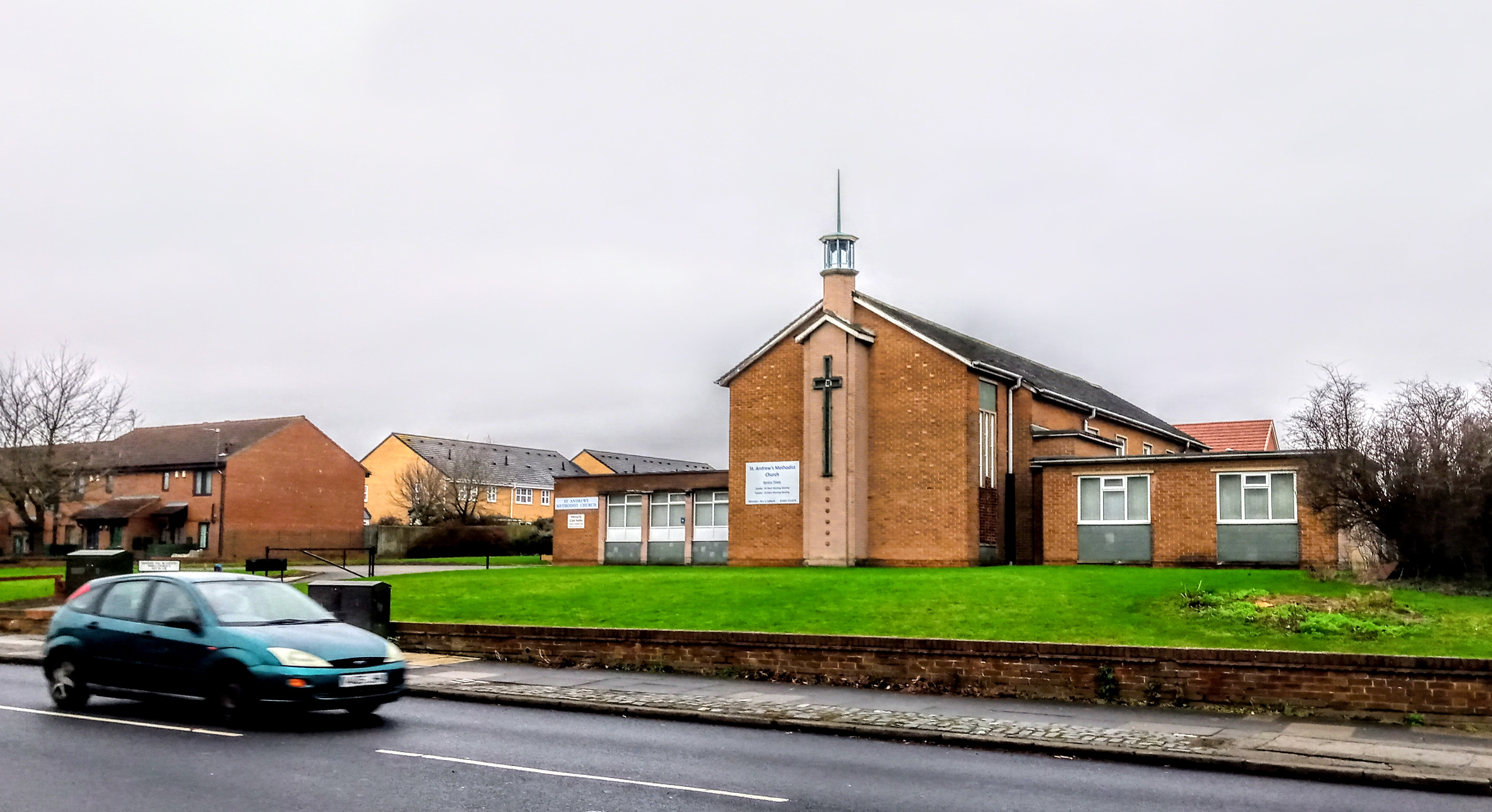
St Andrew's Methodist Church

From 2003–2012, 200 houses in the area were demolished and replaced. There are a number of community based associations including Hardwick in Partnership which will run the community centre from 2014, Phoenix Youth Service and Hardwick Residents association.
