= Outwood Academy Redcar =

Location
- Kirkleatham Lane; Redcar, North Yorkshire, TS10 4AB; England; 54.60551°N 1.08137°W

Information
- Type: Academy
- Motto: Raising Standards and Transforming Lives.
- Established: 1953 (School Debut); 2011 (Academy Status)
- Local authority: Redcar and Cleveland
- Department for Education URN: 145188 Tables
- Ofsted: Reports
- Chair of Governors: Carole Brown
- Principal: Gemma Trattles
- Staff: 120
- Gender: Mixed
- Age: 11 to 16
- Enrolment: 656 as of September 2026
- Capacity: 862
- Houses: Africa, Asia, North America, South America, Oceania
- Colour: none
- Website: redcar.outwood.com

Outwood Academy Redcar (formerly Redcar Academy) is a mixed secondary school with academy status located in Redcar, North Yorkshire. The school had 656 pupils enrolled in September 2026.

The current Associative Executive Principal is Gemma Trattles.

== History ==
Originally Coatham County Modern, the school has also previously been known as Westfields, West Redcar School, and Redcar Community College.

Redcar Community College, initially a community school with a specialism in visual and performing arts, was awarded specialist status for Visual and Performing Arts in 2004. In November 2009 it became a foundation school.

Redcar Academy logo

In December 2012 the school converted to academy status, becoming Redcar Academy. It retained its specialism in visual and performing arts.

In June 2015, an Ofsted inspection found Redcar Academy to "require improvement". In November 2015 the school began receiving support from Outwood Grange Academies Trust (OGAT). The school implemented OGAT's behaviour management policy, style of uniform, and appointed Angela Sweeten—previously of Outwood Academy Ripon—as headteacher. In June 2017, the school announced it would be sponsored by OGAT and reopen as "Outwood Academy Redcar" in September 2017.

In October 2017, the school joined Outwood Grange Academies Trust, and became Outwood Academy Redcar.
