= Outwood Academy Bishopsgarth =

Location
- Harrowgate Lane; Stockton-on-Tees, County Durham, TS19 8TF; England
- Coordinates: 54.5811°N 1.3649°W

Information
- Type: Academy
- Motto: Students First
- Local authority: Stockton-on-Tees
- Trust: Outwood Grange Academies Trust
- Department for Education URN: 143146 Tables
- Ofsted: Reports
- Chair of Governors: Ralph Pickles
- Principal: Sheriden Hutchinson-Jones
- Staff: 3
- Gender: Mixed
- Age: 11 to 16
- Enrolment: 537 as of January 2017
- Capacity: 602
- Houses: Africa, Asia, Americas, Australasia and Europe
- Colours: Purple and gold
- Website: bishopsgarth.outwood.com

Outwood Academy Bishopsgarth (formerly Bishopsgarth School) is a comprehensive secondary school with academy status in the Bishopsgarth area of Stockton on Tees, England. It has a mixed intake of both boys and girls, ages 11–16, and had 537 pupils on roll in January 2017.

The school is operated by Outwood Grange Academies Trust, and the current principal is Sheriden Hutchinson-Jones. Ralph Pickles is the current chair of governors.

== History ==
Bishopsgarth School was a community school operated by the local education authority.

Following an inspection in January 2016, Ofsted rated Bishopsgarth School as "requires improvement" in all areas. In June, the school began working with support from Outwood Grange Academies Trust to tackle low-level disruptive behaviour. On the first day of new "no-nonsense" rules coming into force, 15 pupils received fixed-term exclusions for various misdemeanours.

In November 2016 the school converted to academy status, joining Outwood Grange Academies Trust, and changed its name to Outwood Academy Bishopsgarth.

In January 2019, Ofsted published its first inspection report of the academy since its conversion to Outwood Academy Bishopsgarth.

== Academics ==
The school is rated good by Ofsted. Ofsted noted in the report that it is "being rapidly transformed through the highly effective actions of leaders and the trust".

=== Years 7, 8 ===
During Years 7 and 8, students study a curriculum'which includes English, maths and science as core subjects, with a range of arts subjects, geography, history, a PSRE programme that include religious education, computer science, technology, a modern foreign language and physical education. This fulfills the National Curriculum requirement.

=== Years 9, 10, and 11 ===
Students start studying GCSE or equivalent courses in Year 9. These include English (including English Literature), mathematics and science (which includes physics, chemistry and biology). Students also study physical education and the Life PSRE programme. In addition, students pick optional subjects.

From the three option columns they must choose one subject from History (GCSE), Geography (GCSE), German (GCSE). Then two from WJEC Hospitality and Catering (GCSE), OCR Child Development (Cambridge National), BTEC Tech Award in Business and Enterprise, BTEC Tech Award in Sport, Activity and Fitness.

== Controversies ==
Outwood Academy Bishopsgarth excluded 34% of its pupils on fixed-term exclusions in 2017–2018, the second highest figure in the country, only to be beaten by Outwood Academy Ormesby who excluded 41%.

In 2019 former teachers at the school reported a practice of intimidating 'flattening the grass assemblies', (Note: When a school is rebrokered from a failing trust into Outwood Grange Academies Trust (OGAT), there is a behaviour ethos-setting exercise called “flattening the grass” rolling assemblies. Here the Trust executives visit the school, en masse, to stand around the edge of the assembly hall whilst the local headteacher strongly outlines, to year each group OGAT's expectations of students’ behaviour. It is fixed so individual students are preselected to be singled out to be humiliated in front of their yeargroup; until they break down in tears. If the head of school is not forceful enough, the Trust CEO walks forward and takes over. The students are the “grass” which is “flattened” by the experience.) which the trust denied.

Schoolsweek described what happened at a flattening the grass assembly at Outwood Academy City Fields. They quoted a teacher.

“I’ve never seen anything like it. They were shouting in the faces of any children that were slouching. “Those first assemblies were very, very harsh… The atmosphere was poisonous… The people that were in there were just downright nasty towards the pupils.”

Again the trust denied the accusation.

After being threatened with a court action, the Trust is reviewing its use of consequence rooms and isolation booths in its 31 schools. Here pupils were required to sit in silence in isolation for six hours a day while receiving no teacher input. The Trust had issued 31,000 of these punishment orders to pupils across 14 schools in the trust in the 2017–18 academic year. 1,400 went to children receiving free school meals and 90 to children with education health and care (EHC) plans.
