= Roseworth =

Area of Norton, County Durham, England

Coordinates: 54.589°N 1.342°W

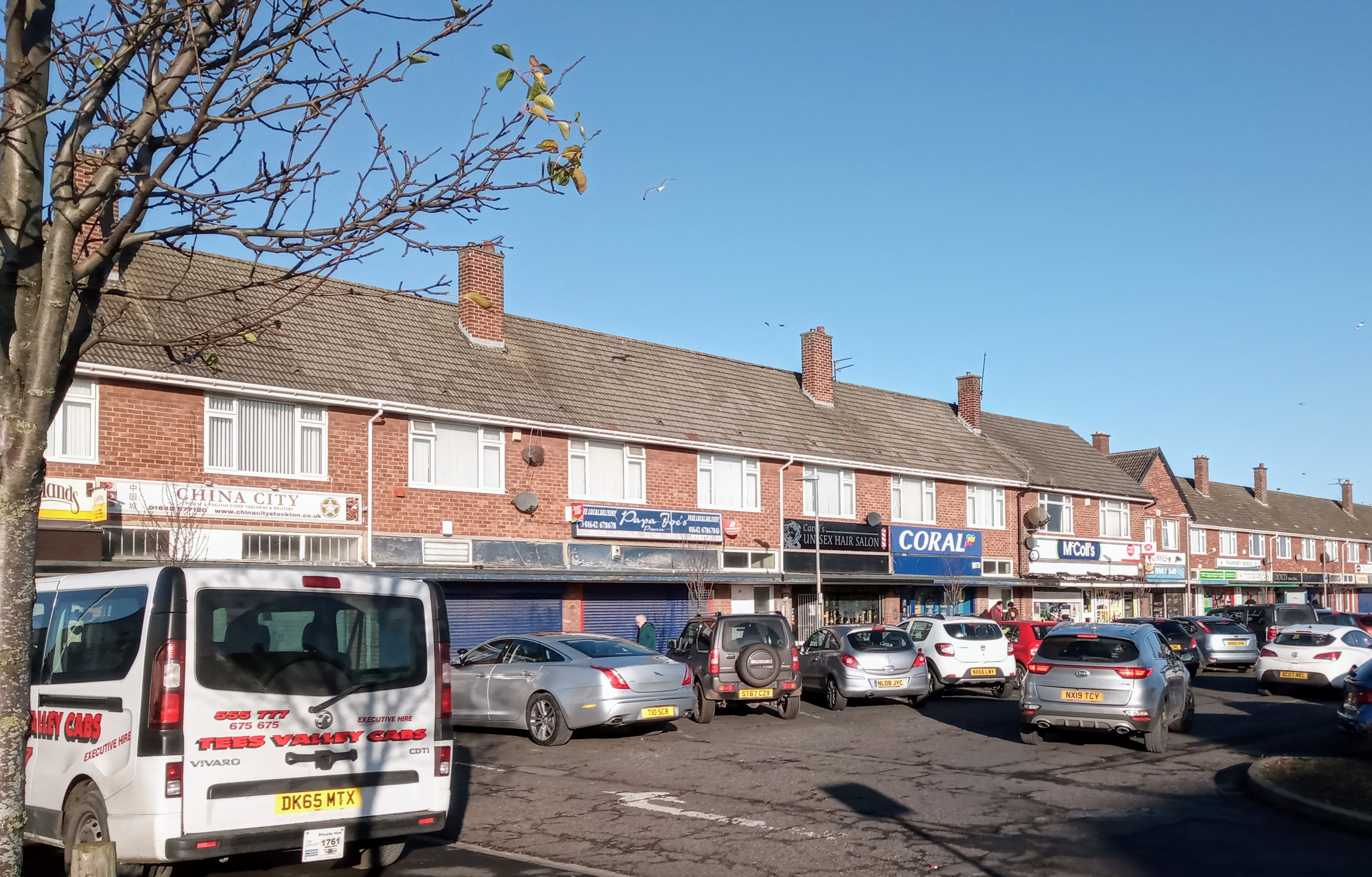
- Roseworth shops

- Location within County Durham
- Population: 7,500 (2011.Ward)
- OS grid reference: NZ426218
- Unitary authority: Stockton-on-Tees
- Ceremonial county: County Durham
- Region: North East
- Country: England
- Sovereign state: United Kingdom
- Post town: STOCKTON-ON-TEES
- Postcode district: TS19
- Police: Cleveland
- Fire: Cleveland
- Ambulance: North East

Roseworth is an area in the Borough of Stockton-on-Tees, County Durham, England.

It borders Hardwick to the south west, Ragworth to the south east (in the same ward) and Norton centre to the east.

The Roseworth housing estate was built in the 1950s, and every street name on the estate begins with "R".

== Gallery ==
Pictures of Roseworth

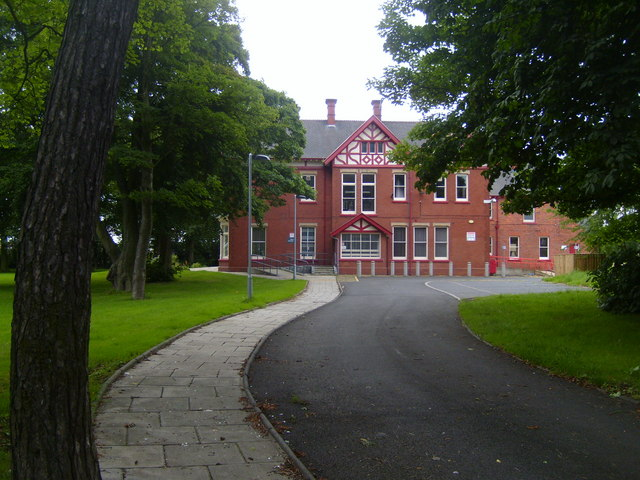

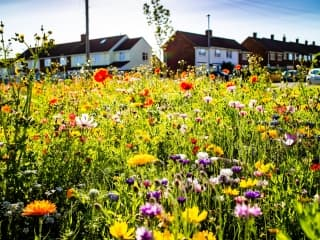

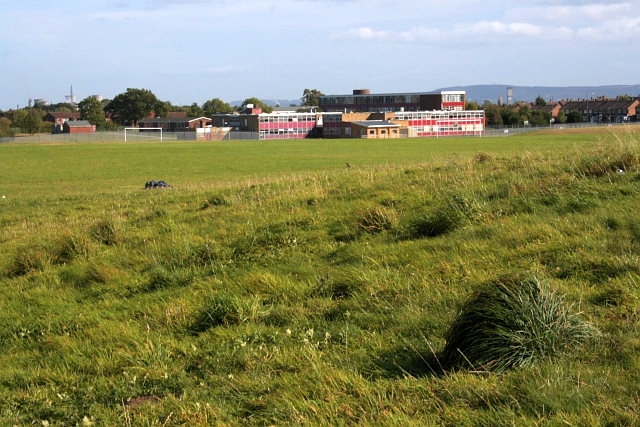

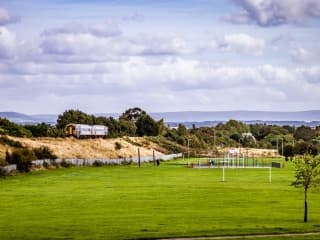

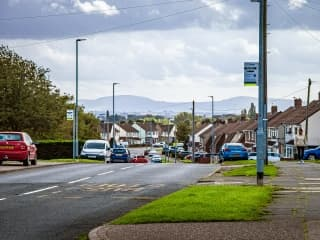

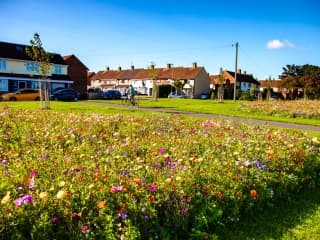

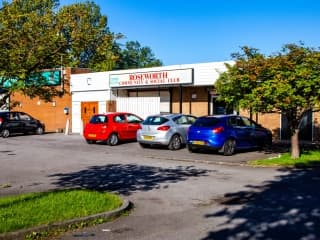

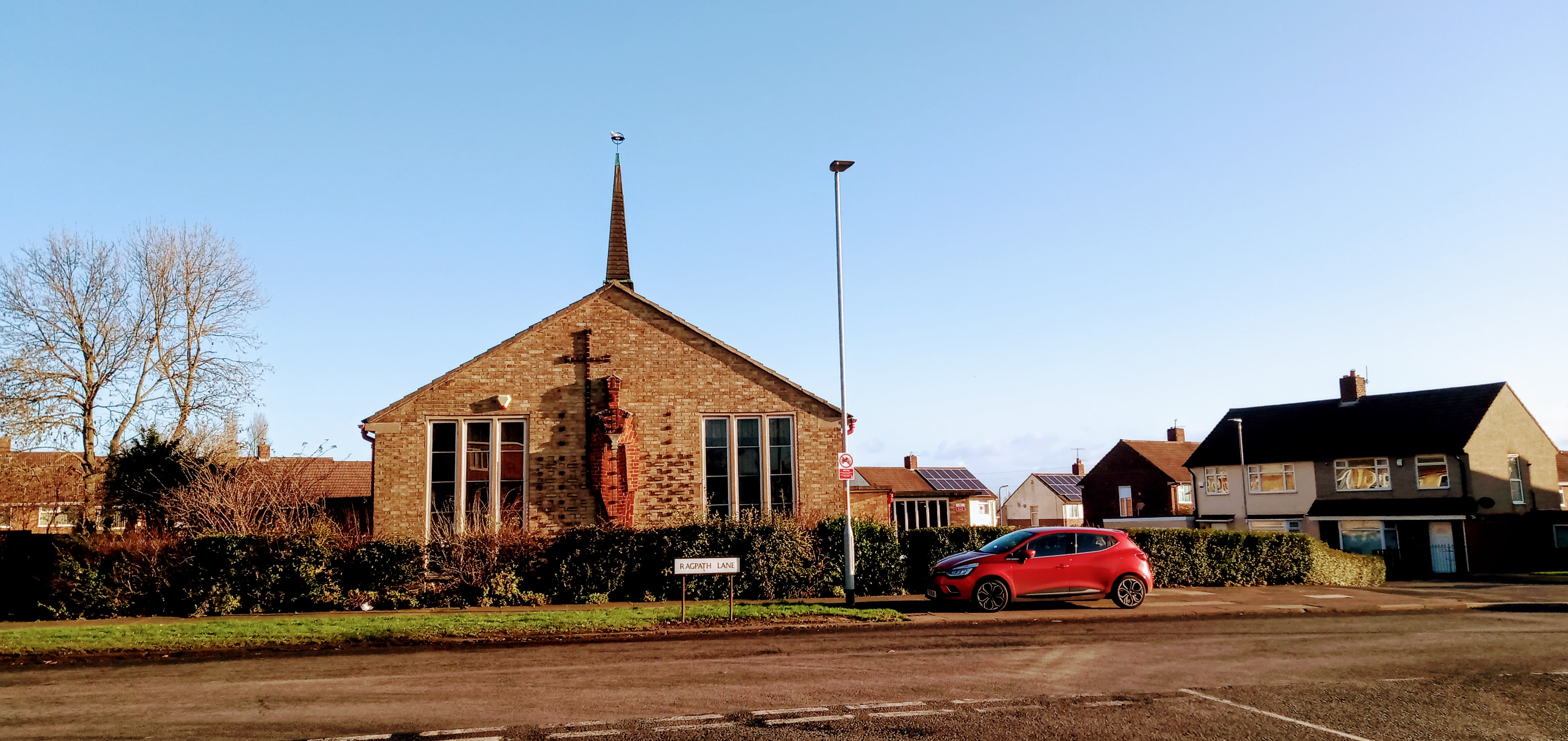
St Chad's Church

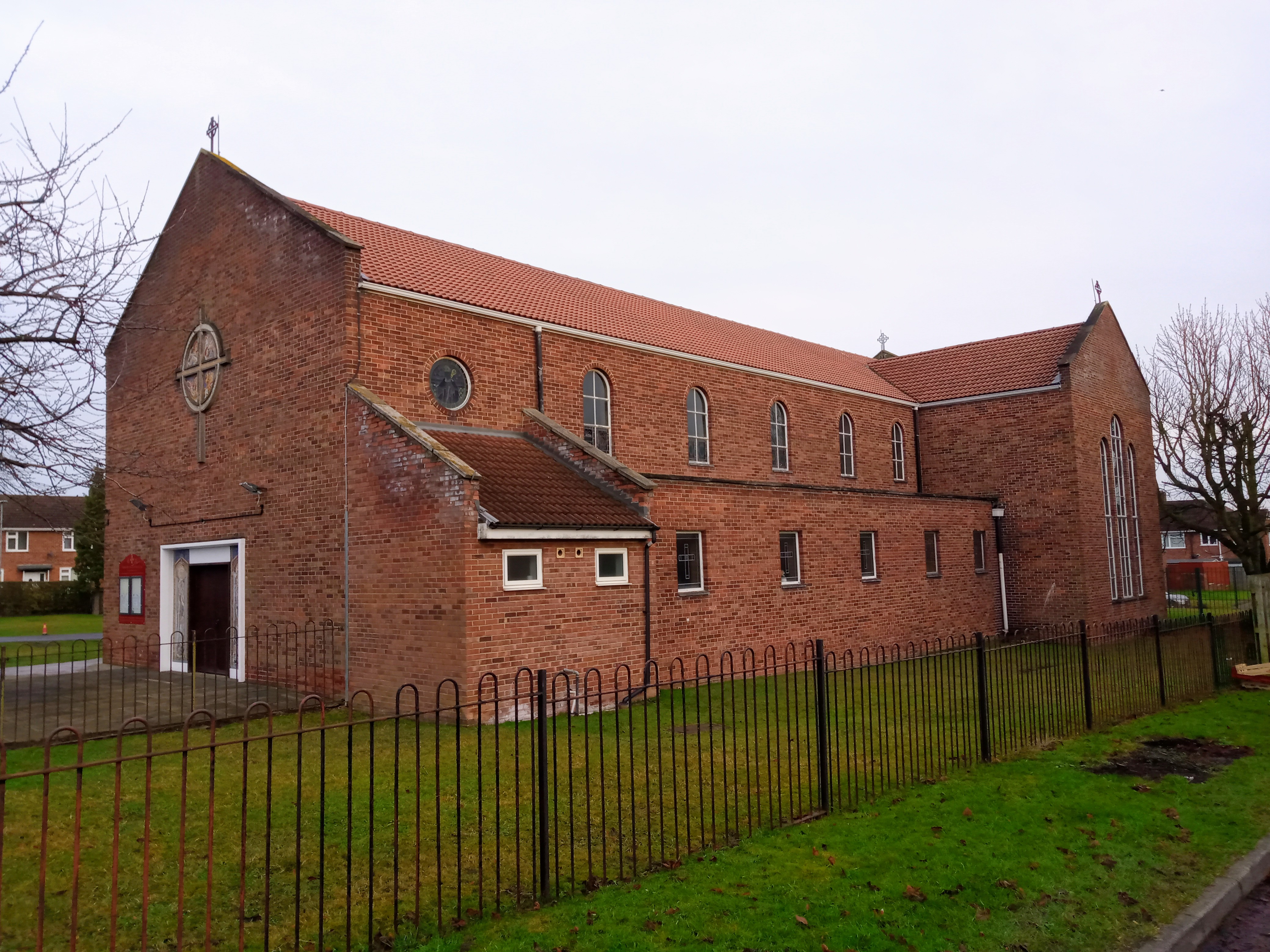
English Martyrs St Peter and St Paul Roman Catholic Church
