= Outwood Academy Brumby =

Location
- Cemetery Road; Scunthorpe, North Lincolnshire, DN16 1NT; England; 53°34′42″N 0°38′42″W

Information
- Type: Academy
- Motto: Students First
- Established: 1928
- Sister school: Outwood Academy Foxhills
- Local authority: North Lincolnshire
- Department for Education URN: 139277 Tables
- Ofsted: Reports
- Chair of Governors: Sue Hague
- Executive Principal: Phil Smith
- Principal: Darren Smith
- Gender: Mixed
- Age: 11 to 16
- Enrolment: 700 pupils as of January 2016
- Capacity: 860
- Houses: Europe, Americas, Asia, Africa
- Colours: Purple and Gold
- Website: brumby.outwood.com

Outwood Academy Brumby (formerly Brumby Comprehensive School and Brumby Engineering College) is a mixed secondary school with academy status, in Scunthorpe (Brumby), North Lincolnshire, England.

The school had an enrolment of 627 pupils in 2016, with a comprehensive admissions policy, having adopted the local authority policy. It is operated by Outwood Grange Academies Trust, and the current principal is Mr. Darren Smith.

== History ==
The school's is currently named after Brumby village, now a suburb of Scunthorpe: the place-name is of Viking origin, derived from the personal name 'Bruni' and the Old Danish word 'by', meaning village or farmstead.

The school was opened in 1929 as Brumby Senior Boys School. In 1930, girls joined the school for one year before moving to Ashby Girls Secondary Modern School. It became Brumby Comprehensive School in 1968, while education in Scunthorpe was being reorganised. It was also in 1968 that girls were admitted permanently to the school with the inclusion of the first woman co-Deputy Head.

In 2002 the school's name was changed to the Brumby School. Since September 2005 it has been a specialist Engineering College. A new engineering centre was opened in 2007.

An Ofsted inspection in December 2011 rated the school as "inadequate" (Grade 4), resulting in it being placed into special measures and receiving external support from Outwood Grange Academies Trust and the local authority in an effort to improve standards. In February 2012 Tom Clark, headteacher at the school for 18 years, announced his retirement. He was succeeded in September 2012 by Pam Buckingham, previously an associate principal of Outwood Academy Adwick.

After receiving a "good" (Grade 2) rating from an Ofsted monitoring visit in March 2013, the school reopened in April 2014 as Outwood Academy Brumby, with academy status and sponsored by Outwood Grange Academies Trust.

Toby Rutter, previously vice principal, became principal when Pam Buckingham retired in September 2015.

== Academic performance ==
Brumby used to score the lowest in GCSEs in North Lincolnshire, below the England average. There are no A-level results because schools in Scunthorpe do not teach to sixth-form level: since the introduction of comprehensive education in Scunthorpe in 1968, sixth-form studies take place at the John Leggott College.

== Headmasters and Principals ==
=== Brumby School ===
- 1994-2005, Tom Clark, Headteacher

=== Brumby Engineering College ===
- 2005-2012, Tom Clark, Headteacher
- 2012-2014, Pam Buckingham, Headteacher

=== Outwood Academy Brumby ===
- 2014–2015, Pam Buckingham, Principal
- 2015–2018, Toby Rutter, Principal
- 2018–2021, Angela Hull, Principal
- 2021, Darren Smith, Principal
- 2022, Amber Bradley, Head of School
- 2024, Donna Fitzgerald, Principal
