= Outwood Academy City Fields =

Location
- Warmfield View; Wakefield, West Yorkshire, WF1 4SF; England
- Coordinates: 53.6885°N 1.4764°W

Information
- Type: Academy
- Local authority: Wakefield
- Trust: Outwood Grange Academies Trust
- Department for Education URN: 136394 Tables
- Ofsted: Reports
- Chair of Governors: Joanne Kendall
- Headteacher: Michelle Colledge-Smith
- Gender: Mixed
- Age: 11 to 16
- Enrolment: 643 as of January 2016
- Capacity: 750
- Website: www.cityfields.outwood.com

Outwood Academy City Fields, formerly Wakefield City Academy, is a mixed secondary school with academy status, located in Wakefield, England. It has over 600 pupils ages 11 to 16 on roll, and its current headteacher is Michelle Colledge-Smith.

== History ==
Wakefield City High School was a foundation school administered by Wakefield Council. In January 2011 the school was renamed Wakefield City Academy when it became an academy and the first school to be sponsored by Wakefield City Academies Trust (WCAT). WCAT came under criticism for executive spending in a leaked government report that also noted Wakefield City Academy's inability to produce records of pupil premium payments. In September 2017, WCAT announced that it was seeking to cease operation and have its schools transferred to alternate sponsor organisations.

In July 2018, the school joined Outwood Grange Academies Trust and was renamed Outwood Academy City Fields. It continues to coordinate with Wakefield Council for admissions.

== Curriculum ==
Wakefield City Academy offers GCSEs, BTECs and City and Guilds courses as programmes of study for pupils.

== Controversy ==
=== Flattening the grass assemblies ===
In 2019 former teachers at, Outwood Academy Bishopsgarth, another trust school reported a practice of intimidating 'flattening the grass assemblies', which the trust denied.

Schoolsweek described what happened at a Flattening the grass assembly at Outwood Academy City Fields. They quoted a teacher.

“I’ve never seen anything like it. They were shouting in the faces of any children that were slouching. “Those first assemblies were very, very harsh… The atmosphere was poisonous… The people that were in there were just downright nasty towards the pupils.”

Again the trust denied the accusation.
