= Outwood Academy Haydock =

Location
- Clipsley Lane; Haydock, Merseyside, WA11 0ER; England; 53.466°N 2.678°W

Information
- Type: Academy
- Established: 1932
- Local authority: St Helens
- Trust: Outwood Grange
- Department for Education URN: 148522 Tables
- Ofsted: Reports
- Gender: Coeducational
- Age: 11 to 16
- Website: haydock.outwood.com

Outwood Academy Haydock (formerly Haydock Secondary Modern School and then Haydock High School) is a coeducational secondary school located in Haydock in the English county of Merseyside.

The school first opened as a secondary modern school in February 1932, and later became a comprehensive.

Previously a community school administered by St Helens Metropolitan Borough Council, in January 2022 Haydock High School converted to academy status and was renamed Outwood Academy Haydock. The school is now sponsored by Outwood Grange Academies Trust.

== Notable former pupils ==
- Martyn Lancaster, former footballer
- Nick McCabe, musician and lead guitarist of The Verve
