= Outwood Academy Ripon =

Location
- Clotherholme Road; Ripon, North Yorkshire, HG4 2DE; England; 54.1368°N 1.5390°W

Information
- Type: Academy
- Motto: "Students First"
- Local authority: North Yorkshire
- Trust: Outwood Grange Academies Trust
- Department for Education URN: 137412 Tables
- Ofsted: Reports
- Principal: Rachel Donohue
- Gender: Mixed
- Age: 11 to 16
- Enrolment: 709 (July 2024)
- Capacity: 750
- Houses: Africa, Americas, Australasia, Europe
- Colours: Purple and gold
- Website: ripon.outwood.com

Outwood Academy Ripon is a small mixed secondary school with academy status situated in the city of Ripon, in North Yorkshire, England. It provides for ages 11 to 18, and has an enrolment of around 700 pupils.

The school is operated by Outwood Grange Academies Trust and the current principal is Rachel Donohue.

It is one of over 11 secondary schools in the local area, including nearby selective Ripon Grammar School, and the more distant Thirsk School and Sixth Form College and Boroughbridge High School.

== History ==
The school originally opened as a secondary modern in the 1930s. It was known as Ripon City School from the mid-1990s until 1999, when it became Ripon College, a community school.

In 2000, teacher James Kelly was a regional winner in the "Most Outstanding New Teacher" category of the Teaching Awards.

In September 2011 Ripon College converted to academy status. It reopened as Outwood Academy Ripon, and became part of Outwood Grange Academies Trust.

On 11 November 2015, approximately 40 pupils at the school simultaneously fell ill during an Armistice Day service. Police said students showed signs of "sickness and feeling faint sometime between 11:00 and 11.30".

As of 2024, the school has "temporarily suspended the sixth form provision".

== Special educational needs provision ==
A specialist team of teaching assistants and special educational needs (SEN) managers work together in 'The Bridge' to ensure that students in need of extra support are getting it. Teachers from the Bridge will mentor students either on site in the Bridge or in the students lessons alongside the main class teacher.
