= Outwood Academy Kirkby =

Location
- Tennyson Street; Kirkby-in-Ashfield, Nottinghamshire, NG17 7DH; England
- Coordinates: 53.09769°N 1.24555°W

Information
- Type: Academy
- Trust: Outwood Grange Academies Trust
- Department for Education URN: 149429 Tables
- Ofsted: Reports
- Principal: Andy Scruby
- Gender: mixed
- Age: 11 to 16
- Website: www.kirkby.outwood.com

Outwood Academy Kirkby is a mixed secondary school located in Kirkby-in-Ashfield town centre, Nottinghamshire, England.

It opened as Kirkby Centre Comprehensive School in 1977 with a single year group of eight form groups each of approximately thirty students. Further year groups consisting of eight to six form groups as needed entered in the six subsequent years until it had a full cohort of five years of education to CSE / O-Level attainment plus two sixth form years mainly studying A-level subjects. It was subsequently named as Kirkby Comprehensive School (not to be confused with the longer established Ashfield Comprehensive School) and then Kirkby College.

The school is largely built on an area previously occupied by the Wharton & Chambers brick works. Completion of its construction continued after opening, with three distinct buildings named as 'lower', 'middle' and 'upper' progressively completed as needed and each sized to accommodate approximately two year groups plus specialist areas for teaching home economics, woodwork, workshop engineering, etc. There was an intent for the school to provide future workers for the skilled machinist industry which supported areas of the local economy such as mining and manufacturing, so the engineering workshops were well equipped with industry specification engineering lathes, milling machines, a simple forge room, etc. In addition there was a large sports building consisting of two areas: a gymnasium hall plus a mixed ball / racquet sports hall with floor markings for various sports. The fixed equipment in each space could be folded away to create open areas for public meetings, examination rooms, etc

Previously a foundation school administered by Nottinghamshire County Council, Kirkby College converted to academy status on 1 August 2012. The school continues to coordinate with Nottinghamshire County Council for admissions.

In September 2022 Kirby College joined the Outwood Grange Academies Trust, and was renamed Outwood Academy Kirkby.
