= Outwood Academy City =

Academy in Sheffield, South Yorkshire, England

Location
- Stradbroke Road; Sheffield, South Yorkshire, S13 8SS; England
- Coordinates: 53°21′32″N 1°23′31″W

Information
- Type: Academy
- Motto: Students First
- Local authority: Sheffield
- Trust: Outwood Grange
- Department for Education URN: 140415 Tables
- Ofsted: Reports
- Executive principal: Phil Smith
- Principal: Emily Rosaman
- Gender: Mixed
- Age: 11 to 16
- Enrolment: 1,109
- Capacity: 1,200
- Colours: Black, Gold and Purple
- Website: city.outwood.com

Outwood Academy City is a co-educational secondary school with academy status located on Stradbroke Road in Sheffield, South Yorkshire, England.. Until 2014 it was known as The City School.

The school is operated by Outwood Grange Academies Trust. The principal is Emily Rosaman.

== History ==
=== Sheffield Pupil Teacher Centre (SPTC) ===
The school was established in the 1890s as Sheffield Pupil Teacher Centre (SPTC)

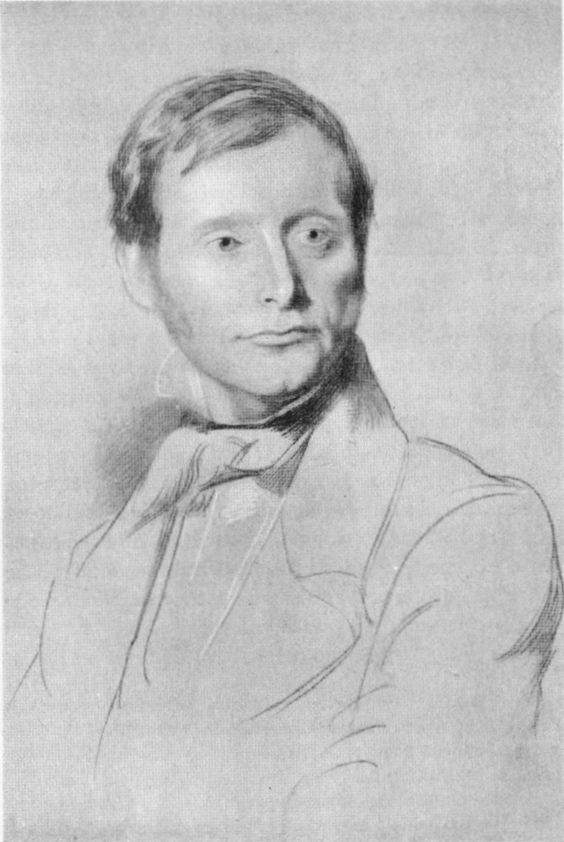
William Edward Forster (Elementary Education Act 1870)

The Elementary Education Act 1870 (33 & 34 Vict. c. 75), commonly known as Forster's Education Act, set the framework for schooling of all children between the ages of 5 and 13 in England and Wales and established local school boards. The main function of these bodies was to use local rates (taxes) to finance the building of schools in cases where the range of existing establishments was inadequate. A driving force behind the Act was a perceived need for Britain to remain competitive in the world by being at the forefront of manufacture and improvement. The only existing formal education until this time had been in church schools and some ragged schools for the poor. Between 1870 and 1880, 3,000–4,000 schools were started or taken over by school boards.

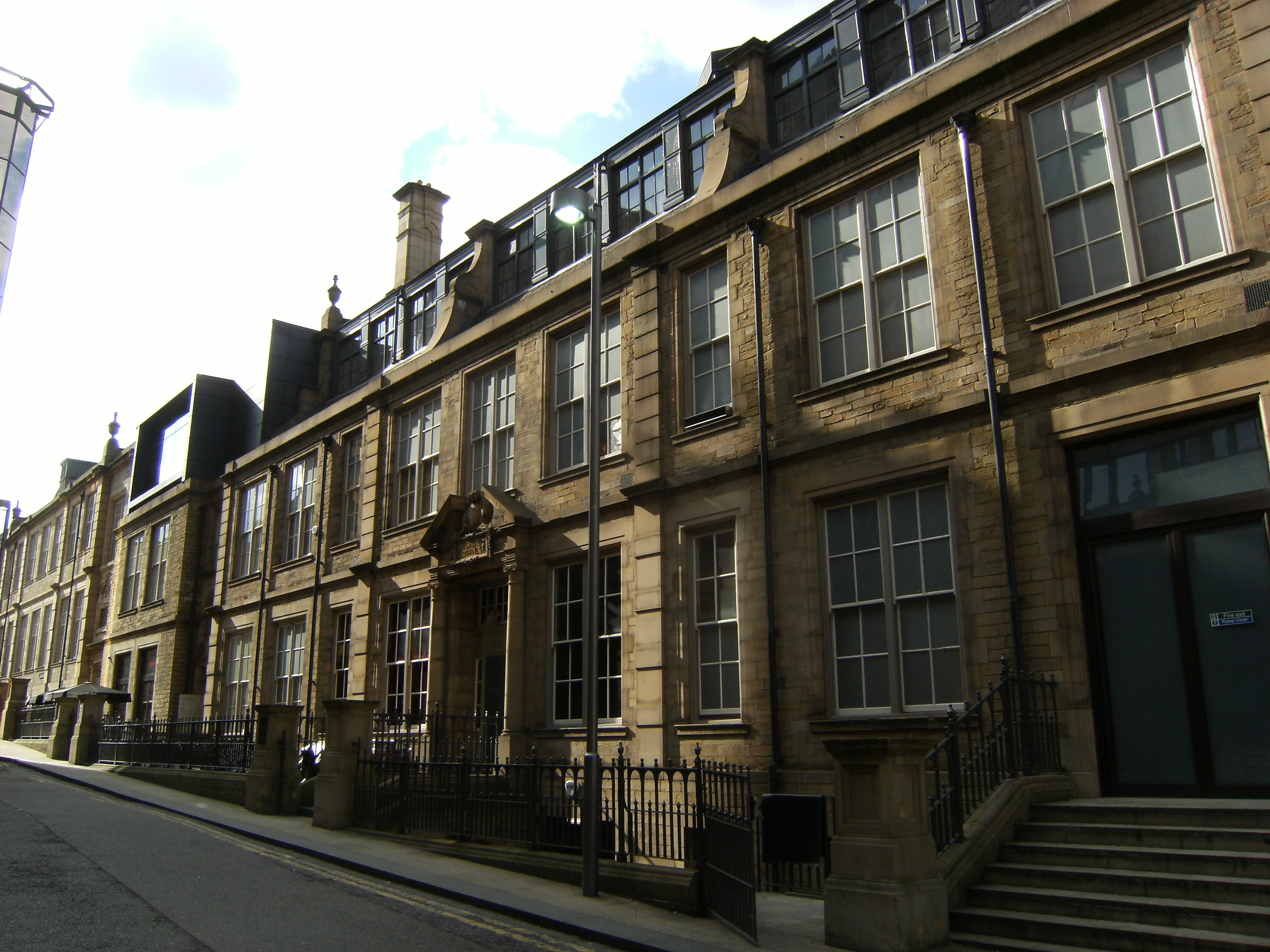
Former buildings along Orchard Lane

The resulting new schools consequently required larger numbers of teachers. Furthermore, higher standards of educational attainment came to be expected in schools, so the quality of the teachers also needed to be raised. It became necessary, therefore, to develop efficient and affordable methods of improving the standards of teacher training. The solution adopted, along the 1870s, 80s and 90s, was the education of "pupil teachers" for a four-year period (14–18 years of age) in specific training centres.

SPTC logo

Pupil numbers declined from 376 in 1906 to 143 in 1912, but subsequent rapid increases in the period 1915 to 1920 led to the necessity to contract thirteen additional members of staff and classes also had to be held at other premises at Carver Street, Townhead Street, Arundel Street (College of Arts and Crafts) and the Central School in addition to the Centre itself. In 1922 the centre implemented an annual admission of four forms of boys and girls who had qualified via the 11-plus, and it effectively became a secondary school.

=== Sheffield City Grammar School ===
In 1941 it was renamed the Sheffield City Grammar School and continued at the city centre site until 1964.

A reporter, writing about the City Grammar School in "Yorkshire Life" magazine, in 1960 commented, "... to me it is one of the city's most interesting schools ... it was co-educational at a time when it was considered revolutionary for the sexes to mingle in class ... there is a solid, down-to-earth atmosphere about it that fits the character of the city, and its pupils have the friendliness and assurance one expects from Sheffield's hard-working, self-respecting citizens ... ".

On 19 February 1964, the first assembly was held for the 760 pupils at the newly completed, £300,000, Stradbroke Road premises. (Sheffield City Council data for 1959/60 had evaluated the cost of the Orchard Lane buildings and furniture, at that time, to be £80,121 14s. 3d.).

=== The City School ===
The City School logo until 2009

In 1969, after becoming a comprehensive, the school was renamed The City School.

In 2007 Ofsted put the school into special measures, but following a June 2008 inspection this decision was rescinded. In 2012 the school was again placed into special measures. David Lack took over as a temporary headteacher.

=== Outwood Academy City ===
In 2014 the school was renamed `Outwood Academy City` and became part of the Outwood Grange Academies Trust.

== Notable former pupils ==
- Joseph Charles Wildsmith, footballer for Sheffield Wednesday
- Jarvis Cocker, musician
- Jamie Reeves (born 3 May 1962), strongman and former winner of the title of World's Strongest Man
- Phil Turner, footballer
- Danny Willett, golfer

=== City Grammar School ===
- Tim Ellis, Bishop of Grantham from 2006–13
- David Ford (footballer)
- Roy Hattersley, Labour politician, MP from 1964-97 of Birmingham Sparkbrook
- Jim Marshall, Labour MP from 1974–83 and 1987-2004 for Leicester South
- Sir Peter E. Middleton GCB - English banker, former Chancellor of the University of Sheffield (1999 - 2015)
- Sir Roger Singleton, Chief Executive from 1984-2006 of Barnardo's
- Mark White (musician), with ABC (band)
