= Elm Tree Farm =

Area of Stockton, County Durham, England

Coordinates: 54.5730°N 1.3500°W

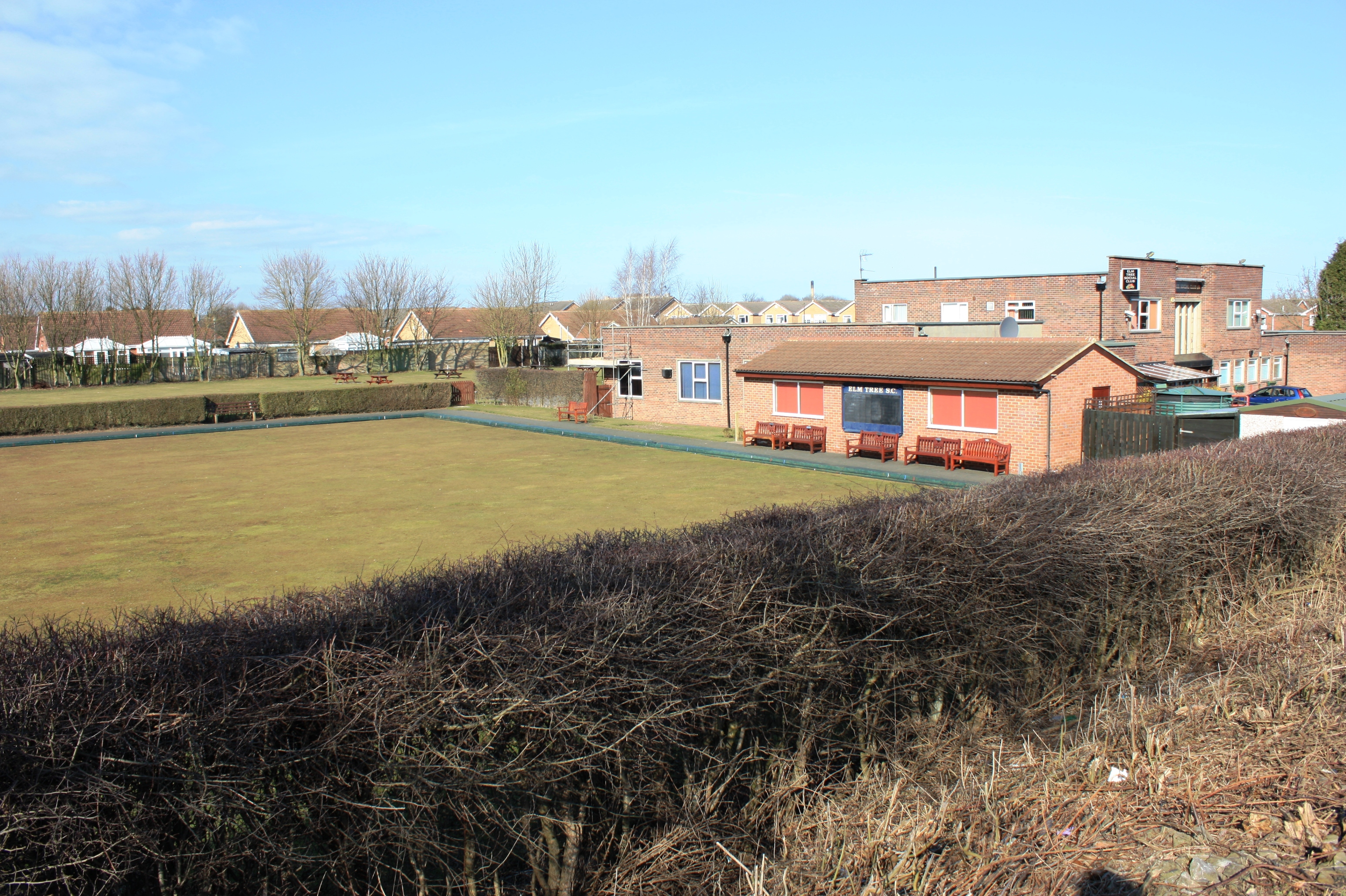
- Bowling Green

- Location within County Durham
- OS grid reference: NZ421199
- Unitary authority: Stockton-on-Tees
- Ceremonial county: County Durham
- Region: North East
- Country: England
- Sovereign state: United Kingdom
- Post town: STOCKTON-ON-TEES
- Postcode district: TS19
- Dialling code: 01642
- Police: Cleveland
- Fire: Cleveland
- Ambulance: North East
- UK Parliament: Stockton South

Elm Tree Farm is a west Stockton area in the borough of Stockton-on-Tees, County Durham, northern England. Whitehouse Primary School is in the area. It is in the same ward as Bishopsgarth and is near Hardwick.
