= Fairfield, County Durham =

Area of Stockton, County Durham, England

Coordinates: 54.5675°N 1.3541°W

Fairfield
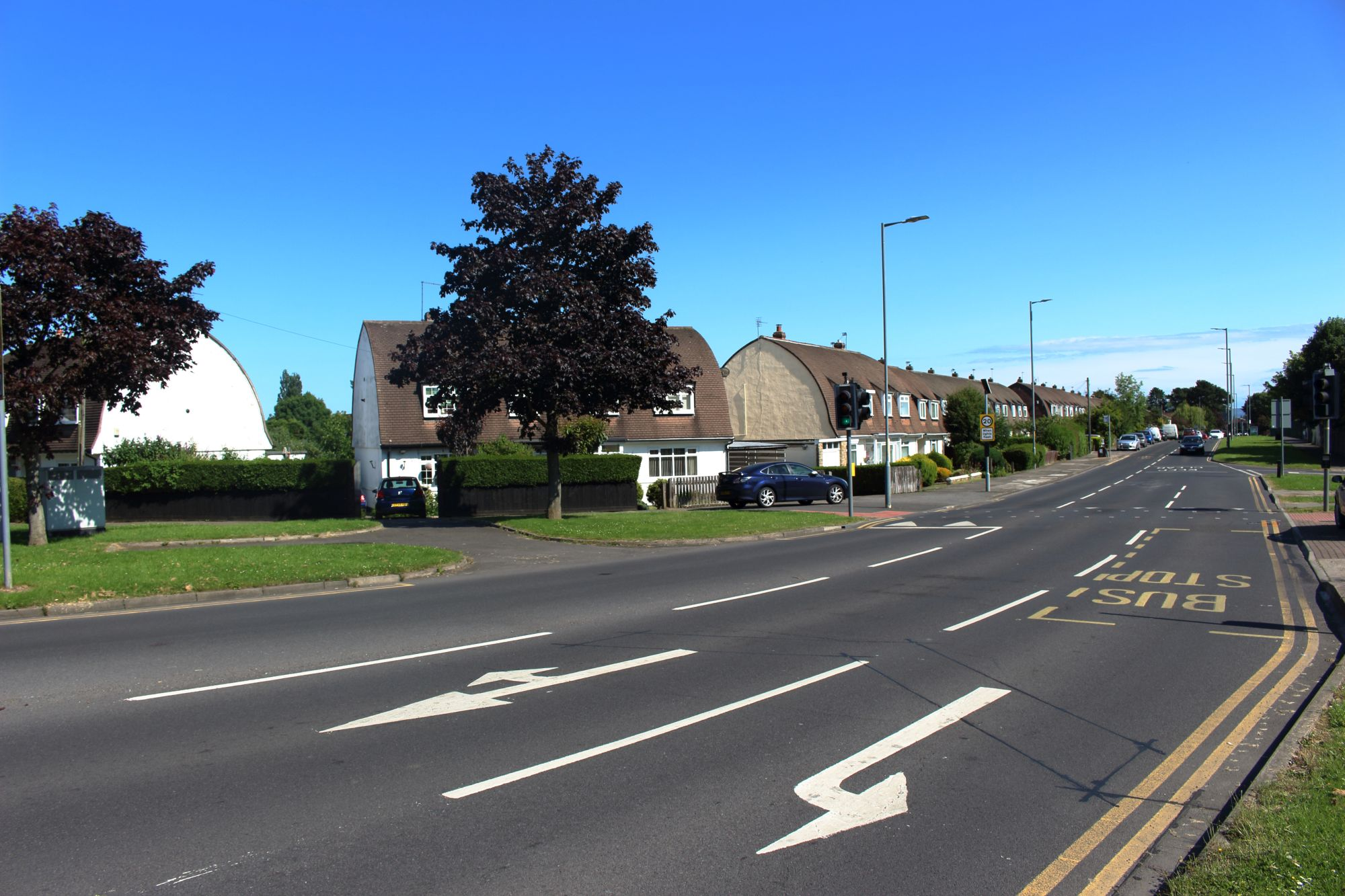
- Fairfield Road

- Location within County Durham
- Population: 5,736 (2011.Ward)
- OS grid reference: NZ417193
- Unitary authority: Stockton-on-Tees
- Ceremonial county: County Durham
- Region: North East
- Country: England
- Sovereign state: United Kingdom
- Post town: STOCKTON-ON-TEES
- Postcode district: TS19
- Dialling code: 01642
- Police: Cleveland
- Fire: Cleveland
- Ambulance: North East
- UK Parliament: Stockton South

Fairfield is in western Stockton in the borough of Stockton-on-Tees, County Durham, England. The area is home to several schools and a small library.

== History ==
Fairfield was originally the site of a field which hosted a fair, hence its name. Some of the oldest housing in the area appears to be around The Avenue. Housing in southern Fairfield, near Hartburn, is older than that in the northern part of the area near Bishopsgarth.

== Geography ==
A green belt divides the suburb from neighbouring Hartburn to the south, while at its western end, Fairfield ends abruptly at the edge of the town.

== Administration ==
Fairfield is administered as a ward in Stockton Borough Council. In June 2021 a proposition that the ward be split in two saw opposition from local councillors.

== Education ==
Fairfield has one infant school (Rosehill), one junior school (Holy Trinity, fed by Rosehill), and three primary schools: Fairfield Primary School, St Mark's CE VA Primary School and St. Patrick's Roman Catholic Primary School. It has two secondary schools: Our Lady and St Bede Catholic Academy, and Ian Ramsey Church of England Academy. It is also home to Stockton Sixth Form College. The Grangefield Academy is technically in the Fairfield ward, but the neighbouring Grangefield estate is in the Newtown ward, not Fairfield.

== Religious Sites ==
Holy Trinity with St Mark is an Anglican church on Bedale Grove. When St Mark's Church closed, its parish merged with that of Holy Trinity Church. St. Patrick's Roman Catholic Church, built in 1973, is on Glenfield Road, adjacent to St. Patrick's Primary School.

== Amenities ==
There are three public houses located in the suburb: The Rimswell, The Fairfield, and The Mitre.

Fairfield Library is next to Ian Ramsey CE Academy.

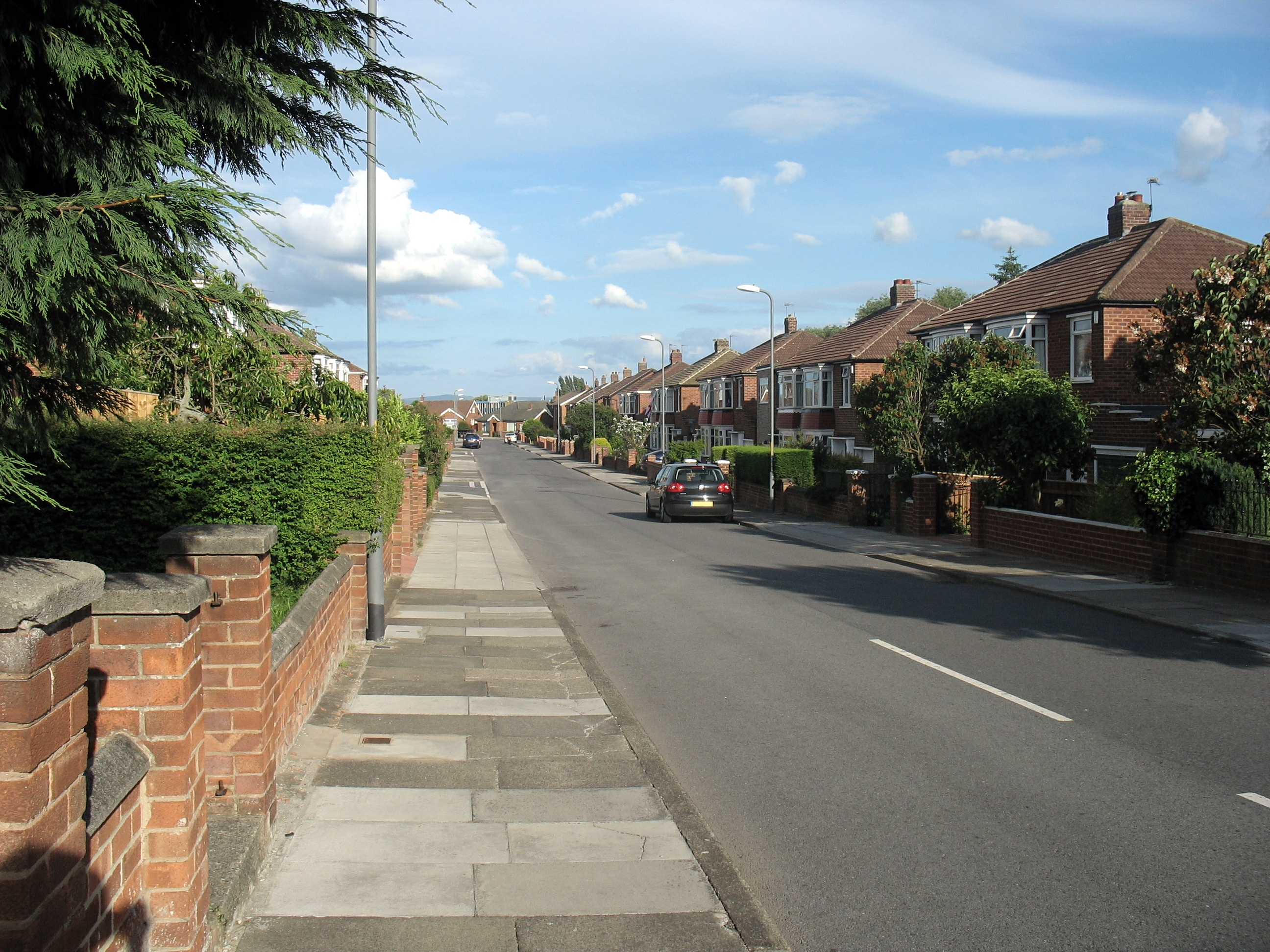
Lealholme Grove - Note Ian Ramsey School in the background.

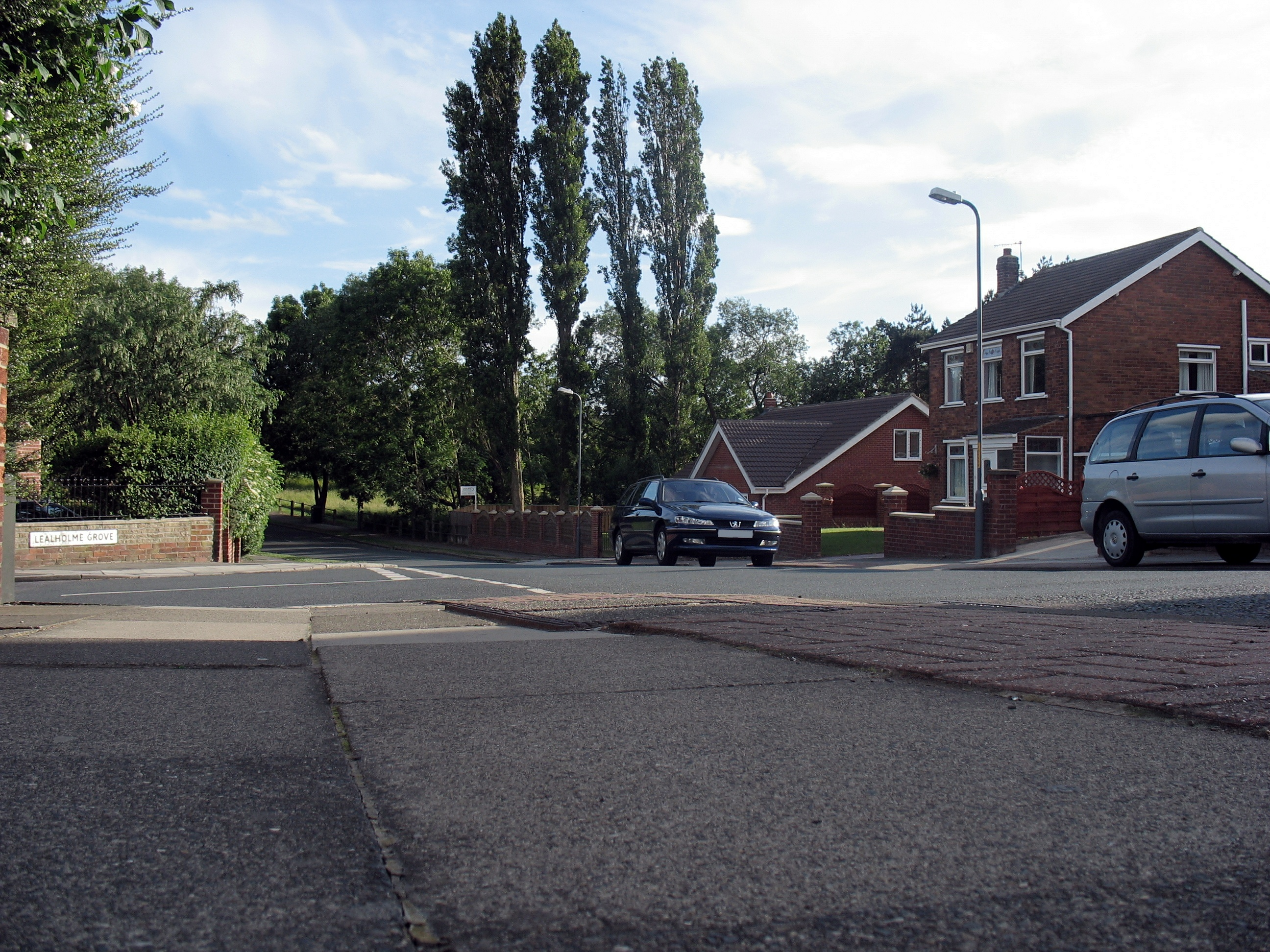
Upsall Grove

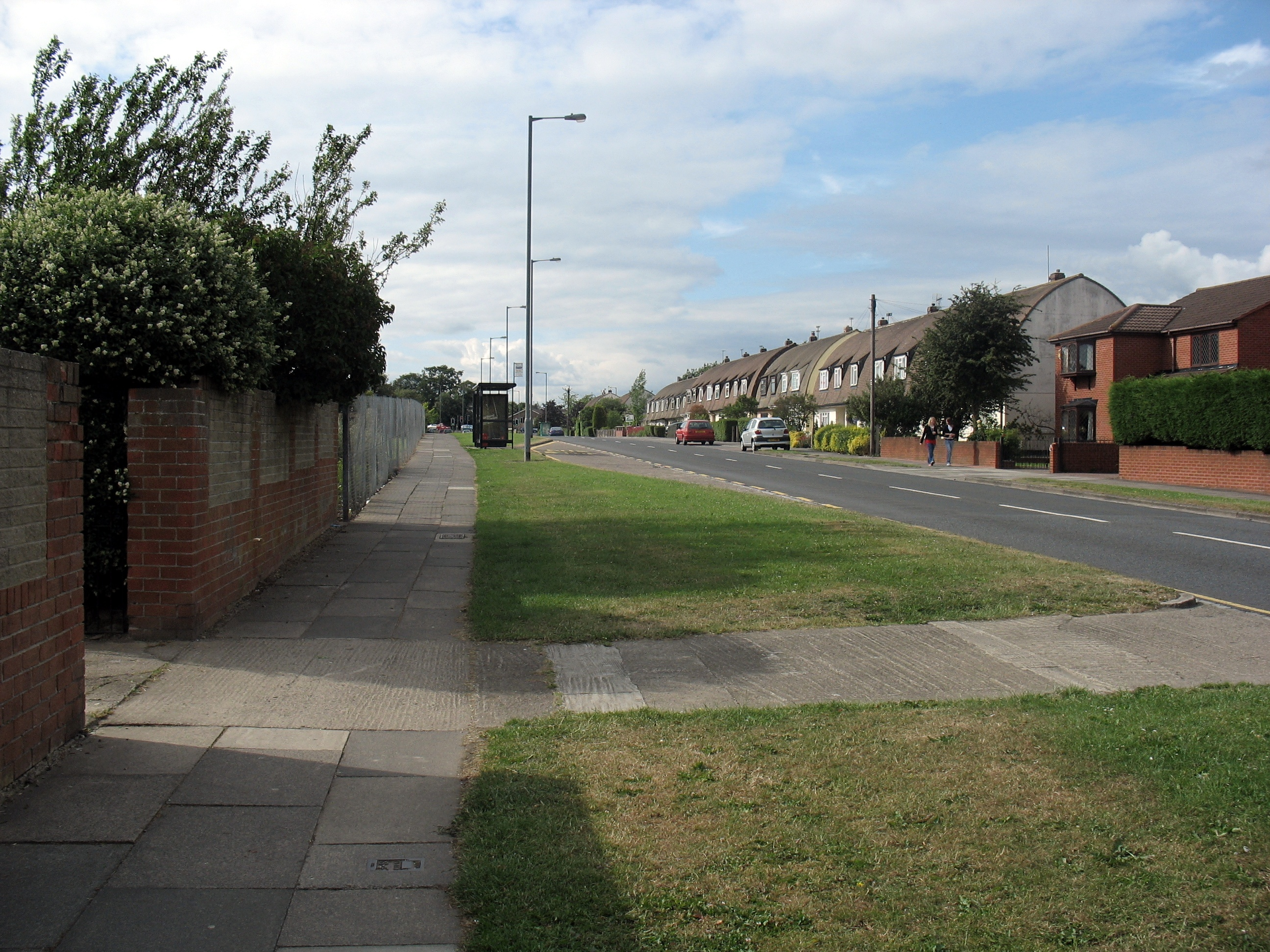
Fairfield Road

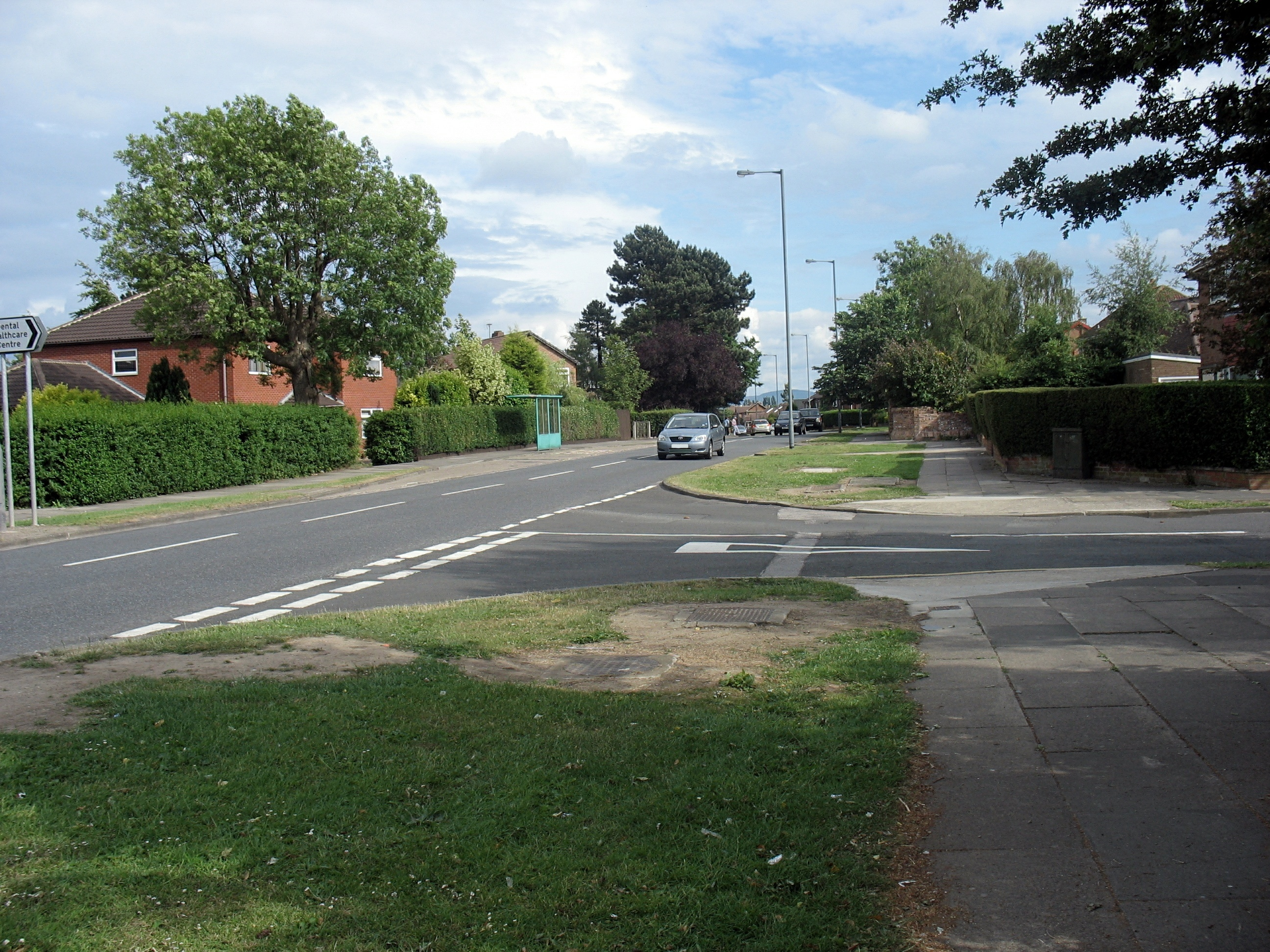
Fairfield Road

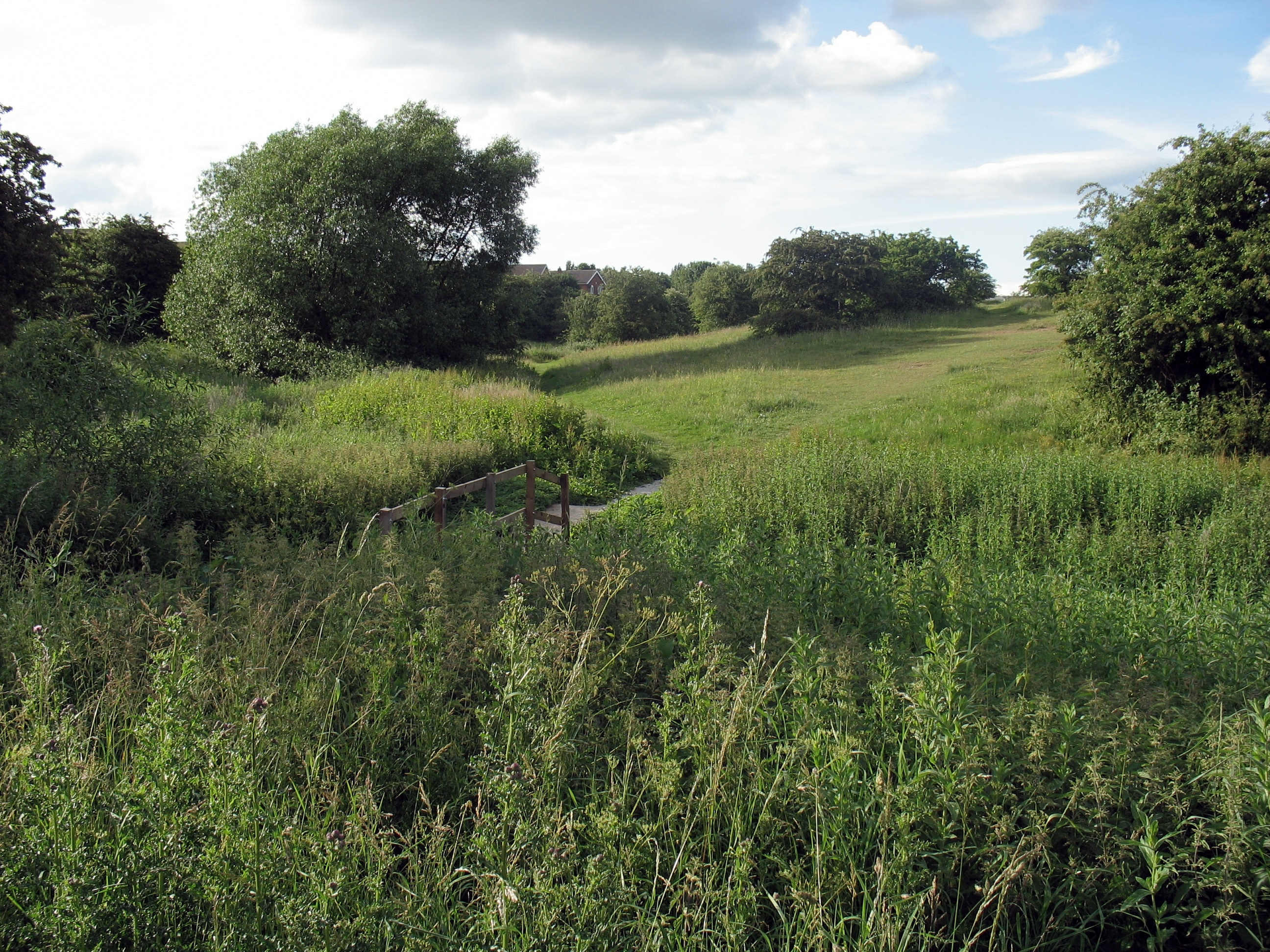
Looking over Green's Beck near Upsall Grove.

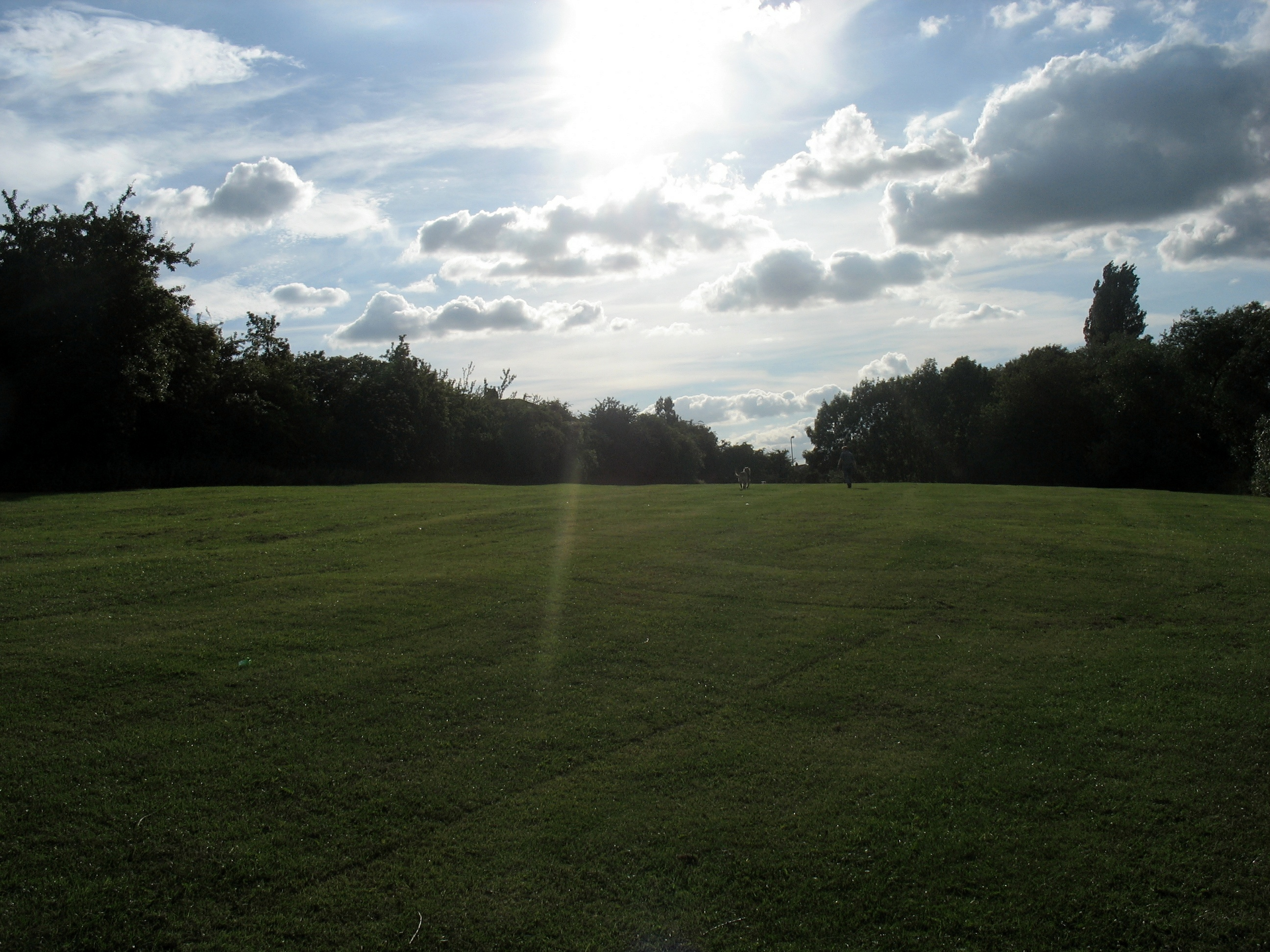
Standing on the Hartburn side of Green's Beck looking towards Ian Ramsey School.
