= Outwood Academy Ormesby =

Location
- Stockwith Close; Netherfields; Middlesbrough, TS3 0RH; England; 54.553997°N 1.173831°W

Information
- Former name: Ormesby School
- Type: Academy
- Motto: "Students First"
- Established: September 1967; 59 years ago
- Local authority: Middlesbrough
- Trust: Outwood Grange Academies Trust
- Department for Education URN: 138711 Tables
- Ofsted: Reports
- Chair of governors: Susan Maidens
- Associate Executive Principal: Gemma Trattles
- Gender: Mixed
- Age: 11 to 16
- Enrolment: 865
- Capacity: 825
- Houses: Africa, Asia, Americas, Australasia and Europe
- Colours: Purple and gold
- Website: ormesby.outwood.com

Outwood Academy Ormesby (formerly Ormesby School) is a mixed secondary school with academy status, located in the Netherfields area of Middlesbrough, England. It has an enrolment of 900 pupils ages 11 to 16, with a comprehensive admissions policy.

The school is operated by Outwood Grange Academies Trust, and the current principal is James Bridge.

== History ==
Ormesby School first opened in September 1967.

As part of the Building Schools for the Future programme the school relocated to new buildings in September 2010.

Ormesby School chose to convert to academy status, with no sponsor organisation, reopening in September 2012 with the new status, but retaining its existing name and uniform. Since the school converted to academy status, Ofsted inspections have rated the school as "Requires Improvement" (2013), "Inadequate" (2015), "Good" (2017), and "Inadequate" (2022).

In September 2014 a new leadership team was appointed, led by Lynn James as headteacher. The school went on to be rated "Inadequate" and placed into special measures by Ofsted in April 2015. The 2015 Ofsted report explains the depth of this Teessides school's problems.

- The school is smaller than the average size secondary school.
- The proportion of students eligible for support through the pupil premium is high. (The pupil premium provides additional funding to support disadvantaged students; including those known to be eligible for free school meals and students looked after by the local authority.)
- The proportion of disabled students and those with special educational needs is high.
- The vast majority of students are of White British heritage. The proportion that has English as an additional language is below average.
- The school did not meet the government's floor standards in 2014. These are the minimum expectations for attainment and progress in English and mathematics at the end of Year 11.
- In September 2014 a new headteacher, deputy headteacher and assistant headteacher were appointed to the school.
- A very high number of students who had been excluded from school for long periods of time in recent years have been reintegrated since the beginning of the school year. From September, the school had created an additional resource centre (ARC) for these students.
- Some students attend alternative provision at Redcar College.
- There has been a high level of staff turnover since September 2014, including many senior leaders leaving the school. By April 2015, approximately half of staff, including a number of senior and middle leaders, will have left the school

The school was rated "Good" in 2017, but returned to "Inadequate" status in 2022.

=== Outwood Grange ===
In September 2015 Ormesby School joined Outwood Grange Academies Trust, and reopened as Outwood Academy Ormesby.

== Controversy ==
=== Exclusions ===
The school excluded 41% of its pupils on fixed-term exclusions in 2017–2018, the highest figure in the country; the second highest was nearby Outwood Academy Bishopsgarth which excluded 34%.

== Notable former pupils ==
=== Ormesby School ===
- Jade Jones, wheelchair racer
