= Outwood Grange Academy =

Academy in Wakefield, West Yorkshire, England

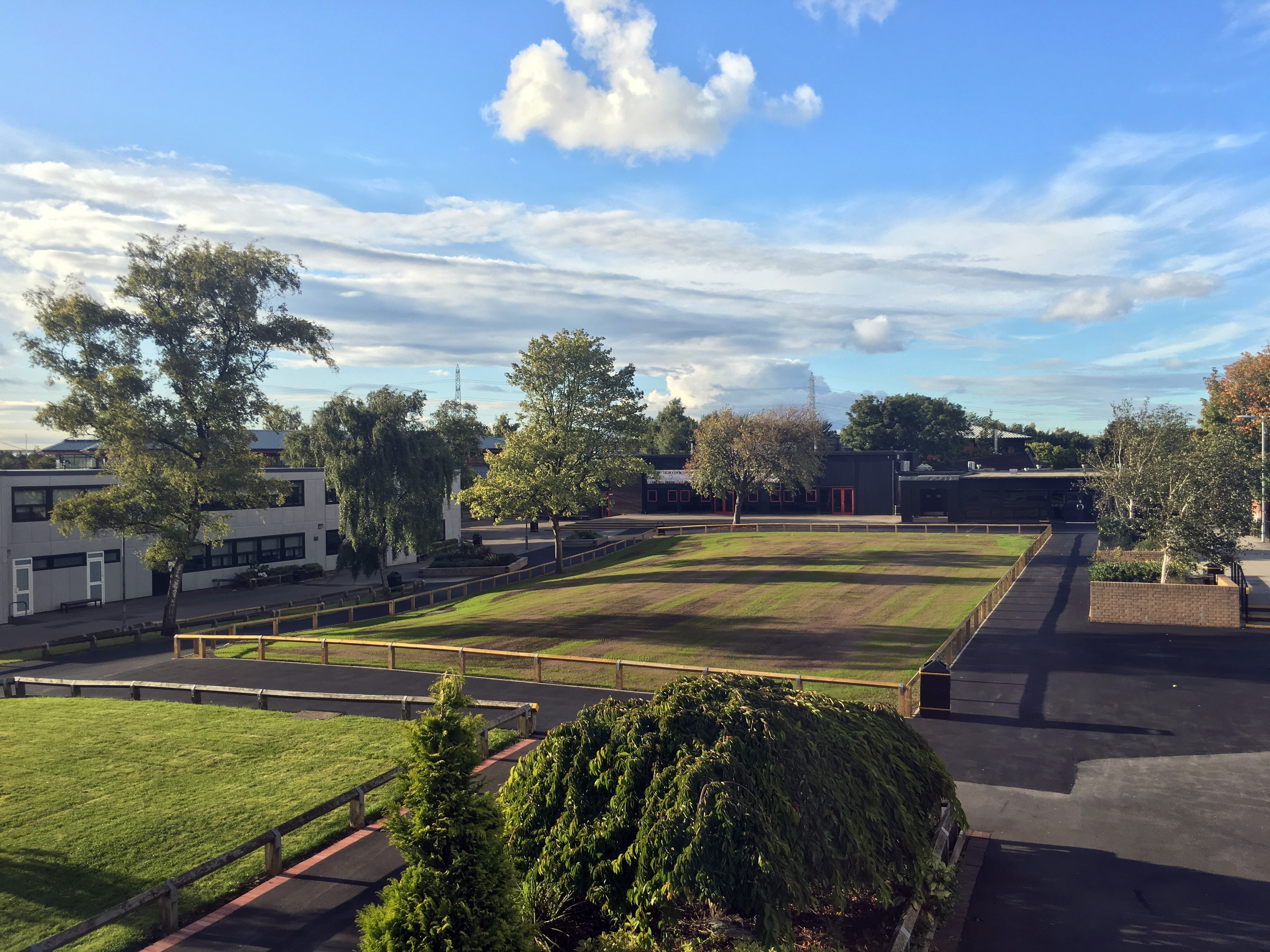

Location
- Potovens Lane; Wakefield, West Yorkshire, WF1 2PF; England; 53.70839°N 1.51352°W

Information
- Type: Academy
- Motto: Students first
- Established: 1972; 54 years ago
- Local authority: Wakefield
- Specialist: Technology
- Department for Education URN: 135961 Tables
- Ofsted: Reports
- Chair of Academy Council: Roland Harden
- Principal: Andrew Downing
- Gender: Mixed
- Age: 11 to 18
- Enrolment: 2,001
- Capacity: 2,200
- Houses: Africa; Asia; Americas; Australasia; Europe
- Colours: Purple and gold
- Publication: Outlook Magazine
- Website: grange.outwood.com

Outwood Grange Academy is a secondary school and sixth form with academy status in Outwood, near Wakefield, England. It has a mixed intake of both boys and girls ages 11–18, and has over 2,100 pupils on roll with a comprehensive admissions policy.

The school is operated by Outwood Grange Academies Trust, and the current principal is Andrew Downing. It publishes a newsletter, Outlook Magazine, on a termly basis.

== History ==
Outwood Grange School was established in 1972 through the merger of Outwood and Stanley secondary schools, with John L Snowdon as its first headteacher.

The Department for Education stated that when Michael Wilkins became headteacher of the school in 2001 it was performing in the bottom 10% of schools. In 2001 BBC secondary school league tables placed Outwood Grange School at 1581st of 3571 secondary schools in England for GCSE results, achieving a 54% pass rate compared to a 50% national average.

In 2002 it became Outwood Grange College after achieving specialist technology college status.

The school subsequently undertook major redevelopment work to improve its grounds, buildings and facilities in general. This included major renovation works to the majority of the Upper College Block, where new ICT suites, a recording studio and improved reception facilities were created. The Lower College Hall also received attention and was equipped with retractable seating and conferencing equipment.

In 2005 a gravel playing field, commonly known as "redgra" after its composition of red gravel, was replaced with an astroturf sports field after many years of fundraising. In the same year a new Business and Training Centre was opened, housing both the Business Department and additional training facilities for rental purposes. The college has used these advanced facilities to aid other schools in the region, and to participate in the launch of national initiatives such as "Make Your Mark Start Talking Ideas", which encourages children and young people to engage themselves with businesses.

In 2008 Outwood Grange College, Horbury School, and Wakefield City High School together formed Aspire Trust, and became trust schools.

In spring 2009 the school was praised in a speech made by Prime Minister Gordon Brown after securing government approval to become England's first "Academy of Excellence". During the transition to academy status the school left Aspire Trust.

=== Outwood Grange Academy ===
In September 2009, Outwood Grange College re-opened as Outwood Grange Academy, operated by the newly formed Outwood Grange Academies Trust. The school's headteacher, Michael Wilkins, became Chief Executive of the trust, which has since gone on to operate other schools across Northern England using Outwood Grange as a model. Mr Wilkins received criticism for overseeing a dramatic increase in pupil exclusions and expulsions. In 2014 Michael Wilkins received a knighthood for services to Education.

The Sir Michael Wilkins Arts Centre opened to pupils in January 2016, after suffering from delays due to the original construction company entering into bankruptcy. The purpose built £6.5 million facility includes art studios, performance spaces, and recording studios.

== Pastoral care ==
In early 2007, the college revealed plans to restructure how tutor groups, the main provision of pastoral care within the college, are organised, moving from the traditional horizontal structure to a vertical one. Although controversial, the plan progressed through consultation and has been put into place from September 2008.

The former structure saw each pupil belonging to a form group of around 30 pupils from their own year-group, which they remain in, together with a teacher acting as a tutor, for their entire school career. The new structure keeps a consistent teacher acting as a tutor to the group, but is mixed-age with pupils from all year groups being included in each mentoring group. This means that each group evolves every year, as older pupils leave and are replaced by younger pupils entering the school. Pupils entering the school are guaranteed, as in the past, to have at least one friend in their mentoring group.

Vertical structuring has been implemented in other secondary schools, the main advantages being seen as the mixing of ages leading to an increased sense of community, allowing for pupils to share experiences, foster understanding and reduce bullying.

Initially this program included members of the 6th form of the academy as part of these vertical mentor groups, or VMGs. However as of 2015 these groups were rearranged. Members of the 6th Form were taken out of the vertical mentor groups and instead placed within mixed guidance groups of year 12s and 13s. This meant the vertical structure was still maintained however it was on a smaller scale of both sides of the academy. As well as separating the secondary school students and 6th form students they also changed the rooms of these groups. This was so that the vertical mentor groups of the same continents were able to be in the same buildings in order to increase coherency within the academy.

Due to COVID-19 and year group bubbles, the VMG program was changed back to the traditional horizontal structure.

== Academic achievements ==
In 2003, the school was achieving a GCSE pass rate with around 46% of pupils achieving five A to C grades. By 2005 that result had risen to 83%. It has been said that much of the increase in 'success' was brought about by using 'GCSE equivalent' qualifications such as GNVQs, which have been criticised as resulting in illusory increases in statistical performance rather than genuine academic improvement.

== Notable former pupils ==
- Matty Wildie, rugby league footballer
- Brad Martin, rugby league footballer
- Yusuf Aydin, rugby league footballer
- Cara Theobold, actress
- Oliver Wood, cyclist
- Mark Applegarth, rugby professional
