= Outwood Academy Riverside =

Address
- 100 Russell Street; Middlehaven; Middlesbrough; England
- Coordinates: 54.5750°N 1.2286°W

Information
- Type: Free school
- Motto: Students first
- Established: 1 September 2020
- Authority: Middlesbrough
- Trust: Outwood Grange Academies Trust
- Department for Education URN: 147848 Tables
- Ofsted: Reports
- Gender: Mixed
- Age: 11 to 16
- Enrollment: 219 (May 2023)
- Colour(s): Purple and gold
- Website: www.riverside.outwood.com

Outwood Academy Riverside is a secondary school in Middlesbrough, England. It has a mixed intake of boys and girls ages 11–16 with a comprehensive admissions policy.

The school opened as a free school in September 2020, operated by Outwood Grange Academies Trust. It initially had 100 year 7 pupils and was based at temporary premises while constructing a dedicated site in Middlehaven. Originally planned to be ready in 2023, construction suffered delays due to the COVID-19 pandemic and contract re-tendering. By the summer of 2023, the school had moved into a second temporary premises. It received a new completion date of 2026 and began seeking a third temporary site capable of accommodating more pupils. Lack of bus transportation and strangers outside the school were concerns.
