= Beverley School, Middlesbrough =

Beverley School

Location
- Saltersgill Avenue; Middlesbrough, North Yorkshire, TS4 3JS; England; 54.5487°N 1.2347°W

Information
- Type: Community special school
- Motto: A specialist school for children and young people with autism
- Established: Mid 1970s
- Local authority: Middlesbrough
- Department for Education URN: 111773 Tables
- Head teacher: Craig M. Platt
- Gender: Co-educational
- Age: 3 to 19
- Enrolment: 139
- Houses: None
- Website: http://www.beverleyschool.co.uk

Beverley School is a community special school in Middlesbrough, England. The school supports children with autism and is based in a campus with another school, Hollis Academy (formally Prince Bishop School).

Originally opened as a special school for hearing-impaired children back in the mid-1970s, the school began to admit children with autism in the 1980s and is now a regional centre of excellence.

Since Easter 2011 Beverley School has shared a campus with Hollis Academy (formerly Prince Bishop School).
