= Netherfields =

Area of Middlesbrough, North Yorkshire, England

Coordinates: 54.55455°N 1.1782°W

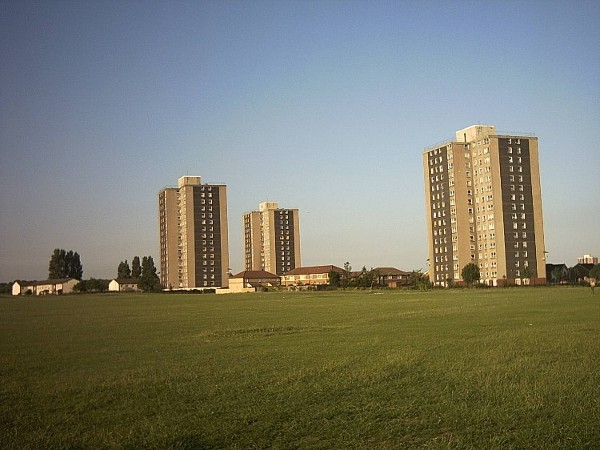
- High-Rise Flats
- OS grid reference: NZ534166
- Unitary authority: Middlesbrough
- Ceremonial county: North Yorkshire
- Region: North East
- Country: England
- Sovereign state: United Kingdom
- Post town: MIDDLESBROUGH
- Postcode district: TS3
- Dialling code: 01642
- Police: Cleveland
- Fire: Cleveland
- Ambulance: North East
- UK Parliament: Middlesbrough

Netherfields is an area in the Park End and Beckfield ward of the Borough of Middlesbrough, North Yorkshire, England. It forms the north-east side of the Ormesby.

The area includes Outwood Academy Ormesby, Priory Woods (School and Arts College), and Pennyman Primary Academy. Fulbeck Road is the main road through the area.

== Housing ==
Erimus Housing is the main housing provider, managing the social housing which in the past was owned by Middlesbrough Council. The housing stock has gone through several stages in the evolution of Netherfields. Most housing is traditional, 1960s terraced houses, but there have also been rows of flats with communal stairways, demolished in the 1980s, and several blocks of high-rise flats.

There is some mostly private housing consisting of semi detached houses around Netherfields Crescent.

In 2009, two of Netherfields' three high-rise blocks of flats were demolished, after a lengthy consultation with Netherfields' residents. The flats, which were built in 1968, each contained 90 flats. Concerns from residents indicated problems within each of the blocks, which experienced high levels of anti-social behaviour and were becoming increasingly difficult to let. The demolition was carried out by the use of explosives, and provided a spectacle for those who came to watch. After the demolition, Erimus Housing made improvements to the remaining block of flats, Welton House, which included new kitchens, bathrooms, rewiring and new double glazed units.

== Education ==
=== Outwood Academy Ormesby ===
Outwood Academy Ormesby (formerly Ormesby School) is an 11–16 co-educational secondary school with academy status, in Netherfields. The school currently has 843 pupils on roll, and is an engineering specialist school. As part of the Building Schools for the Future programme the school relocated to new buildings in September 2010.

=== Pennyman Primary Academy ===
Pennyman Primary Academy (formerly Northlands Primary School) is the primary school in Netherfields. Pennyman is a mainstream primary school which extends the aspect of inclusion by providing children with complex learning needs. The school has 441 students with specialist provision for 55 children with physical and medical needs who are taught inclusively alongside their peers. There is also a 39-place nursery and a special resource nursery.

=== Priory Woods School and Arts College ===
Priory Woods School and Arts College is a special school, which worked closely with, and is located on the same site as, Ormesby School. It provides for the needs of children and young people with a variety of learning needs, whose needs would not be met in either a mainstream, or other special school. The majority of the pupils have complex needs, with 40% of them having profound and multiple special needs. This group of students have their daily therapeutic and medical needs met by access to physiotherapists, speech and language therapists, an occupational therapist and the school nursing team, who work closely with school staff. Priory Woods became a Beacon School in September 2002 and in February 2006 was classed as an ‘outstanding’ school by Ofsted). In September 2007, it became a specialist arts college with a focus on raising achievement in dance, 3D art, and ICT including animation.
