= Outwood Academy Hindley =

Location
- Mornington Road; Hindley; Greater Manchester, WN2 4LG; England
- Coordinates: 53.5321°N 2.56327°W

Information
- Type: Academy
- Established: early 1960s
- Local authority: Wigan Council
- Trust: Outwood Grange
- Department for Education URN: 148526 Tables
- Ofsted: Reports
- Gender: Coeducational
- Age: 11 to 16
- Website: hindley.outwood.com

Outwood Academy Hindley (formerly Mornington High School and then Hindley High School) is a coeducational secondary school located in Hindley in the English county of Greater Manchester.

Mornington High School was established in the early 1960s and became a comprehensive in 1976. The school was renamed Hindley High School in 2006, and was then rated "Good" each year by Ofsted inspectors who praised the improvements made by students during their journey throughout the school. Ratings for the school first changed in 2015, when inspectors concluded that plans by leaders for school improvements did not adequately reflect student progress and for the first time since its renaming inspectors deemed the school "required improvement". The school remained at this stage until 2020, where inspectors deemed the school inadequate; particular attention was drawn to the leadership and management of the school.

Previously a foundation school administered by Wigan Metropolitan Borough Council, in January 2022 Hindley High School converted to academy status and was renamed Outwood Academy Hindley. The school is now sponsored by Outwood Grange Academies Trust.

Outwood Academy Hindley offers GCSEs, BTECs, Cambridge Nationals and ASDAN awards as programmes of study for pupils. The school also offers evening adult education classes to the local community.
