= Outwood Academy Foxhills =

Location
- 2 Foxhills Road; Scunthorpe, Lincolnshire, DN15 8LJ; England; 53.60061°N 0.6666°W

Information
- Type: Academy
- Department for Education URN: 137004 Tables
- Ofsted: Reports
- Principal: Tracy Motson
- Gender: Mixed
- Age: 11 to 16
- Enrolment: 563 as of February 2016
- Website: http://www.foxhills.outwood.com

Outwood Academy Foxhills is a mixed secondary school located in Scunthorpe, North Lincolnshire, England.

== History ==
=== Secondary modern school ===
The school opened as Foxhills Secondary School in January 1951, with room for 400 children, with nine classrooms, two housecraft or domestic science, one craft, one woodwork or metalwork, and science laboratory. It was built with Tudor sand-faced bricks from the Isle of Axholme. The school was officially opened Saturday 19 May 1951 by the Labour minister of education George Tomlinson, and his wife, with the Mayor of Scunthorpe, Fred Gough. The school cost around £110,000.

The next part of the school would cost around £85,000, to provide room for 700 children, with six more classrooms, four art and craft rooms, two gymnasiums, and another science room. The headteacher was Mr Dennis Gilgallon, who had been educated at Brigg Grammar School; he died aged 54 on Thursday 19 November 1964 in S War Memorial Hospital, after being taken ill on Tuesday 17 November 1964. But the next phase, costing £79,000, would have to wait until 1959 for work to start.

Houses were Axholme, Trent, Berkeley and Cliff. The school was overcrowded by 1958, with 600 children in a school designed for 450.

=== Comprehensive ===
The headmaster was Cliff Buck, who retired in July 1985. 37 year old Bob Lennox took over in September 1985, leaving at the end of 1989. He was replaced by Stephen Cook in February 1990.

=== Technology college ===
It was previously known as Foxhills School, it gained specialist status in Technology and was renamed Foxhills Technology College. Foxhills was the town's first specialist school, and then became Scunthorpe's first Performing Arts College in 2007, adding specialisms in Maths and Computing in 2008 following Government designation as Scunthorpe's first High Performing Specialist School.

=== Academy ===
It was previously a community school administered by North Lincolnshire Council, Foxhills converted to academy status on 1 August 2011 and was renamed Invenio Academy. On 1 September 2014 the academy became part of the Outwood Grange Academies Trust and was renamed Outwood Academy Foxhills.

== Curriculum ==
Outwood Academy Foxhills offers GCSEs and BTECs as programmes of study for pupils.

== 1970 accident ==
On Saturday 14 February 1970 Martin Geoffrey Daly fell 409 feet off Swirral Edge on Helvellyn, near White Side, and died. His body was recovered by the Patterdale rescue team. He had been in a team of five boys and three teachers, when he slipped.
