= Pods =

Pods may refer to:

- PODS (company), a moving and storage company based in Clearwater, Florida
- Capsule hotel or hotel pods, small rooms for short stays at a low price
- James Podsiadly (born 1981), Australian footballer
- Orthotube, a door-like security device seen in the BBC television series Spooks
- Palm OS, Developer Suite
- Pipeline Open Data Standard
- Plain old data structure
- Symposium on Principles of Database Systems, an ACM symposium started in 1982
- pods, a Boston-based alternative rock band that included brothers Ben Deily and Jonno Deily
- A common abbreviation in aquarism for copepods, a group of small crustaceans found in the sea and nearly every freshwater habitat
- Personal online data store, a storage system for personal data through Solid (web decentralization project)

== See also ==
- Pod (disambiguation), including POD
- The Pods, a leisure centre in Scunthorpe, England
- "The Pods", an episode of the TV series Adventure Time
