= Pod =

Pod or POD may refer to:

== Biology and medicine ==
- Pod (fruit), a type of fruit of a flowering plant
- Husk or pod of a legume
- Pod of whales or other marine mammals
- "pod", a Greek-derived root meaning 'foot'
  - "-pod", a suffix used in taxonomy
  - POD, abbreviation used in hospitals for podiatry
- Sarco pod, a euthanasia device

== Electronics, computing, and mathematics ==
- Protective Oceanic Device, an electronic shark repellent
- Pseudo open drain, an electronics interface technology
- Point of delivery (networking)
- Personal online data stores, storage of personal data for the web decentralization project Solid
- Pod, the basic scheduling unit in Kubernetes
- Plain Old Documentation, a documentation tool for the computer language Perl
- Plain old data in computing, data distinct from an object
- Proper orthogonal decomposition in the field of numerical simulation
- Proper Orthogonal Decomposition or principal components analysis, in statistics

== Arts and media ==
=== Fictional entities ===
- Podracer, a type of vehicle from the Star Wars universe
- Orthotube or pod, a fictional security device in Spooks
- Pod, the growth medium for the replacements in Invasion of the Body Snatchers
- Pod, a fictional organic gaming console featured in existenz
- Personal Overhaul Device on Snog Marry Avoid?

=== Music ===
- P.O.D., an American metal band from San Diego, California
- Pod (Afro Celt Sound System album) (2004)
- Pod (The Breeders album) (1990)
- The Pod, a 1991 album by Ween
- Pod (amp modeler), a line of guitar amp modelers by Line 6
- "POD" (song), a 2006 song by Tenacious D from The Pick of Destiny
- "10 Ribs & All/Carrot Pod Pod" or "Pod", a 2015 song on the deluxe edition of Presence by Led Zeppelin

=== Other media ===
- Point of divergence of an alternate history from actual history
- Print on demand or publishing on demand
- Pod, a format used by Current TV
- Pod (film), an American horror film
- Pod (sculpture), a sculpture by Pete Beeman
- POD (video game), a 1997 racing game
- Proof of Destruction, a 1987 video game, also known as P.O.D.
- Pod, 2022 novel by Laline Paull

== Transportation ==
- Pod (vehicle), in the proposed Ultra personal rapid transit system
- Engine pod or nacelle, a streamlined aircraft engine enclosure
- Escape pod, a small capsule to escape a vessel in an emergency
- Pod propulsion, ship propulsion method also known as an azimuth thruster

== Other uses ==
- Pod (caste), former name of Indian caste now known as Poundra
- Pod Children's Charity, an English charity
- Peace One Day, a non-profit organisation
- Coffee pod, ground coffee in a filter container
- Pod hotel, cheap accommodation with very small rooms
- Laundry detergent pod
- Proof of delivery of an item
- Probability of detection, a nondestructive testing term
- Gun pod, a detachable weapons pack
- Targeting pod, a target designation tool used by ground-attack aircraft
- POD, Payable on Death, a form of account titling; see Totten trust

== See also ==
- iPod, a portable media player designed by Apple Inc.
- Podcast, a form of digital media
- PODS (disambiguation)
- PPOD (disambiguation)
