= Doncaster College =

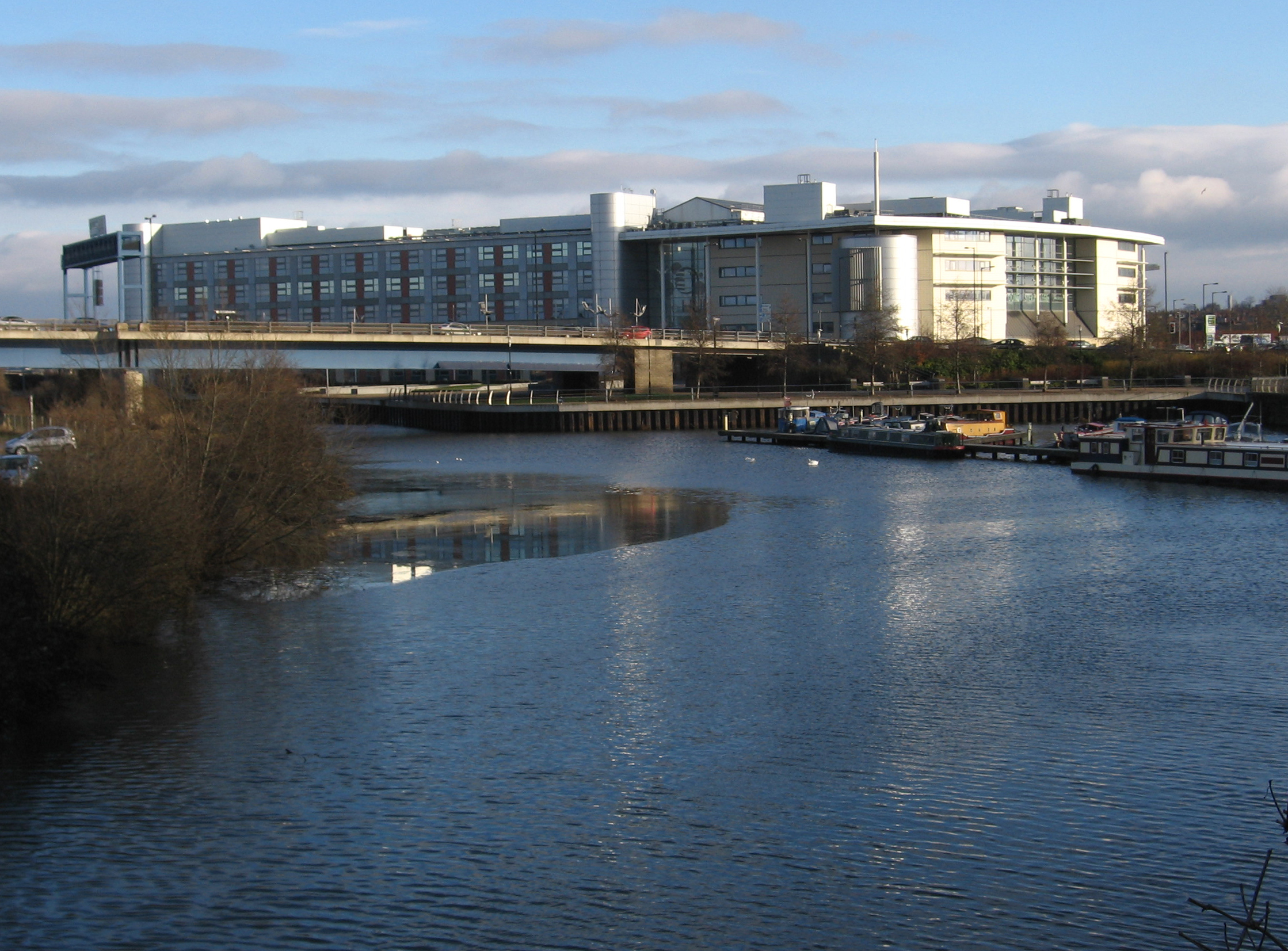
- The Hub Campus

Location
- Chappell Drive; Doncaster, South Yorkshire, DN1 2RF; England
- 53.5280°N 1.1329°W

Information
- Department for Education URN: 130526 Tables
- Ofsted: Reports
- Chair of the DN Colleges Group Board of Governors: Angela Briggs
- Chief Executive Officer of DN Colleges Group: John Rees
- Principal of DN Colleges Group: Danny Fenwick
- Gender: Mixed
- Age: 16+
- Website: www.don.ac.uk

Doncaster College is a further education college based in Doncaster, South Yorkshire, England. The college shares its site with University Campus Doncaster, which provides a range of higher education programmes.

Both Doncaster College and University Campus Doncaster are operating divisions of the DN Colleges Group, alongside North Lindsey College, University Campus North Lincolnshire, and Humber Energy Skills Training Academy.

== History ==
=== Origins ===
The origin and identity of Doncaster College can be traced back to the early history of technical education in the area. From about 1870, further education was delivered at a variety of small locations within the town.

It all started through two evening classes in Great Northern Science and Art, taught by Mr L H Branston, who was a school master by day and artist by night. These classes were held in the St James’ School (or the great Northern Railway School). The first subjects taught were freehand and perspective drawing and machine construction.

The Science and Art department at South Kensington ran the courses until education responsibility was taken over by West Riding County Council in 1887.

=== Doncaster Technical College ===
Following national legislation, changed technical education arrangements culminated in the appointment of the first Principal of Doncaster Technical College, George Grace. At the time he said: "To the man with scientific knowledge and tastes the world grows more beautiful day by day: as his knowledge gets deeper and deeper. Nature offers ever-increasing sources of delight."

Doncaster Technical College began the development of a centre dedicated to Science, Art and Technology, which would open in 1915 as Church View, a building erected next to St George's Minster.

=== Doncaster College of Education ===
In 1947, around 4,850 students were enrolled on 985 classes and the college was running out of room and needed expansion. Church View was expanded yet again but it was obvious more needed to be done.

The house and gardens at High Melton were converted to a Teacher Training Centre, known as Doncaster College of Education. It was founded by the County Borough of Doncaster Education Authority and was a constituent college of the Sheffield University Institute of Education.

It had been the residence of an 18th-century Dean of York, John Fountayne, who is buried in the church there. Much of the building dates from this period, and was owned by the Montagu family. The campus came complete with on-site halls of residence for students and 126 acres of idyllic countryside. Doncaster LEA bought the land for £10,300.

The High Melton campus was officially opened in 1952.

=== Waterdale campus ===
Post-war demands on the college were so great the Church View could no longer cope by itself. Work started on an ambitious development at Waterdale in the centre of town. Some 6,300 students enrolled at various sites.

Waterdale opened and became the headquarters of Doncaster Technical College in 1961. Church View remained as the specialist Arts Centre of the college. The estimated cost of development was £1.3million.

=== Development in the 2000s ===
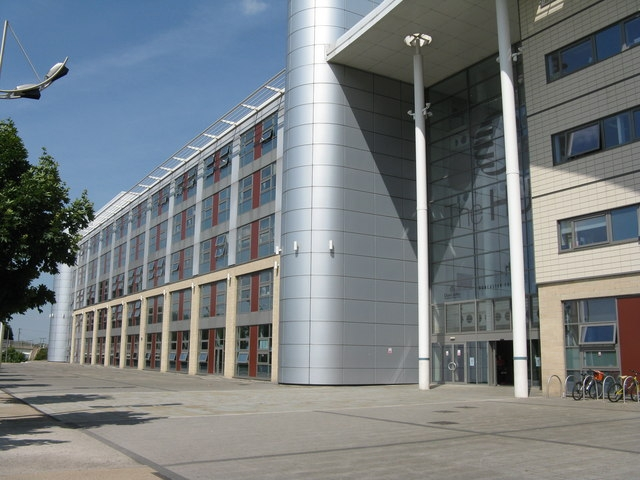
The main Doncaster College building, known as The Hub

In the 2000s, Doncaster College underwent a major development as part of the "Doncaster Education City" project, which had the ultimate ambition of creating "University College, Doncaster" by 2009, followed by a "University of Doncaster" by 2012.

In 2004, as a first stage in this process, Doncaster College designated its High Melton campus as the "University Centre". The purpose of the University Centre was to build on the College's existing record of higher education provision by providing a wider range of qualifications at Level 4 and above in the Regulated Qualifications Framework, with support and accreditation from the University of Hull.

In September 2006, following years of planning and construction work, the College opened a new £65-million campus on the town's waterfront, The Hub. At the same time, the Church View and Waterdale campuses were closed to the public.

In 2017, the closure of the High Melton campus was announced, and the University Centre was relocated to The Hub.

=== DN Colleges Group ===
On 1 November 2017, Doncaster College merged with Scunthorpe-based North Lindsey College, creating the DN Colleges Group.

From 2022, the University Centre, now based on the same site as Doncaster College, was rebranded as the University Campus Doncaster. The College primarily offers Level 1–4 qualifications under the Regulated Qualifications Framework, whereas the University Campus offers a range of Level 4–7 qualifications.

== Academics ==
In the latest Ofsted report, published in April 2016, the college was judged to be "Good" in all judgement aspects.
