= Scunthorpe Civic Centre =

Municipal building in Scunthorpe, Lincolnshire, England

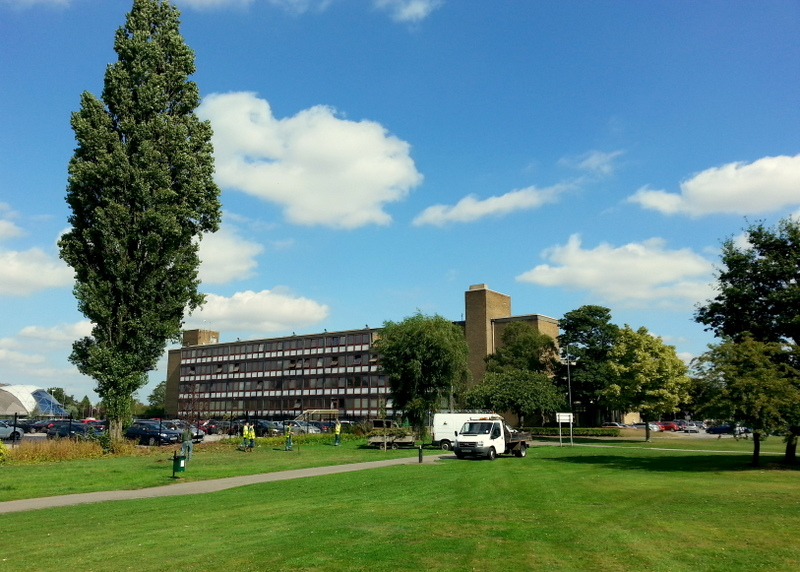
- The building in 2013

- Shown in Lincolnshire
- 53.5811°N 0.6555°W
- Location: Ashby Road, Scunthorpe

History
- Built: 1962

Site notes
- Architect(s): Charles B. Pearson and Partners
- Architectural style: Modernist style

Listed Building – Grade II
- Official name: North Lincolnshire Council Offices formerly Scunthorpe Civic Centre
- Designated: 24 April 1998
- Reference no.: 1323702

Scunthorpe Civic Centre, also known as Pittwood House, is a municipal building in Ashby Road in Scunthorpe, a town in Lincolnshire in England. The building served as the headquarters of Scunthorpe Municipal Borough Council and later of North Lincolnshire Council. Since 2019, the building has been used as a higher education college, University Campus North Lincolnshire. It is a Grade II listed building.

== History ==
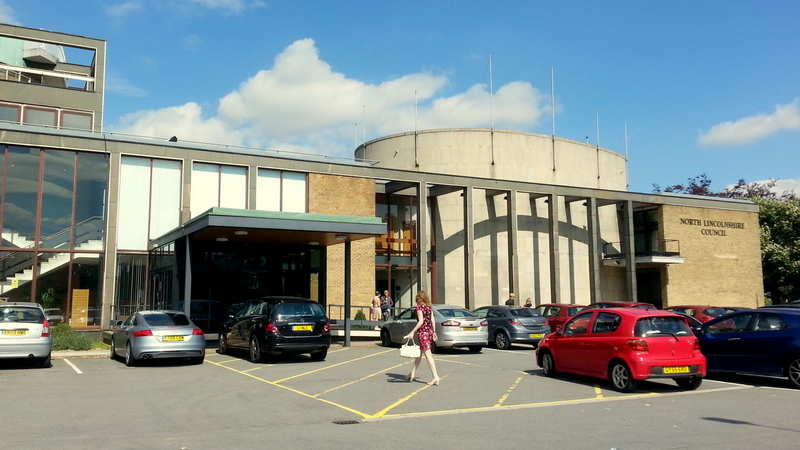
The main entrance in 2013

Following significant population growth in the late 19th century, largely associated with the steel industry, the town appointed a local board of health in 1890. Scunthorpe became an urban district in 1894, and, in this context, civic leaders established council offices, along with a Carnegie library, on Old Station Road (now known as High Street East). However, following amalgamation with Frodingham Urban District in 1919 and advancement to the status of municipal borough in 1936, the council's responsibilities grew and, by the mid-1950s, the existing premises were inadequate.

Civic leaders therefore decided to commission a more substantial building. The site they selected, on Ashby Road, was open land. Construction of the new building started in 1960. It was designed by Charles B. Pearson and Partners in the modernist style, built with a steel frame cased in concrete and with extensive glazing, and was completed in 1962.

The civic centre continued to serve as the headquarters of the borough council for most of the rest of the century and remained the headquarters of the new unitary authority, North Lincolnshire Council, after it was formed in 1996. Civic leaders renamed it "Pittwood House", to commemorate the life of Alderman Edwin Pittwood.

In 2019, the council moved to Church Square House, and the former civic centre was subsequently handed over to the University Campus North Lincolnshire, a joint venture between North Lindsey College and the University of Lincoln. The conversion works, which involved the conversion of the council chamber into a lecture theatre and the conversion of the offices into teaching spaces, was carried out by contractors, Britcon, and completed in summer 2020.

== Architecture ==
The L-shaped building has a four-storey north wing, housing offices, and a two-storey east wing, with the council chamber on the ground floor, and committee rooms above. Between the blocks is a link containing the main entrance, and there is a 1980s restaurant in the angle of the wings. In the entrance hall is a 4th-century Romano-British mosaic of the goddess of agriculture, Ceres, which was excavated from a Roman villa in Winterton in 1959. The council chamber block is built of white stone panels, and the roof is partly covered in copper. The office block has a concrete-covered steel frame, clad in slate, and hardwood windows with steel panels below. The building was grade II listed in 1998.
