= PPOD =

PPOD or P-Pod may refer to:

- pPod, a mobile structure used by the Horse and Bamboo Theatre
- Poly Picosatellite Orbital Deployer
- Plasma polymerized, 1,7-Octadiene
- People's Party of Dominica

== See also ==
- POD (disambiguation)
