= Central Park, Scunthorpe =

Park located in England

Central Park
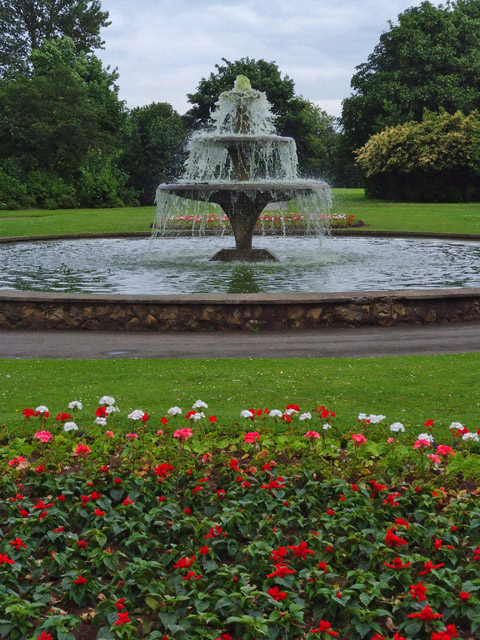
- Interactive map of Central Park
- Type: Urban Park
- Location: Scunthorpe, Lincolnshire, England
- Coordinates: 53.5829°N 0.6682°W
- Open: All year
- Website: North Lincolnshire Council

Central Park is the premier urban park in Scunthorpe, Lincolnshire, England.

== History ==
The park was opened as part of the Festival of Britain to celebrate the end of World War II. The children's play areas used to feature a steam locomotive and there was a paddling pool.

== Location ==
North Lincolnshire Council, the owner, is based in the Civic Centre at the park and North Lindsey College is adjacent.

== Facilities ==
There are formal gardens in front of the Civic Centre and a boulevard that is used by pedestrians and cyclists to cross the park between a leisure centre and North Lindsey College. There is a children's play area, cafe and a splashpad wet play area. The pods leisure centre is based at the park offering indoor sports and swimming pools. Scunthorpe Parkrun takes place in the park every Saturday morning at 9am, the run is 5 km in length and mostly on the park's tarmac footpaths. The park won a Green Flag Award in 2017.

=== Fountain garden ===
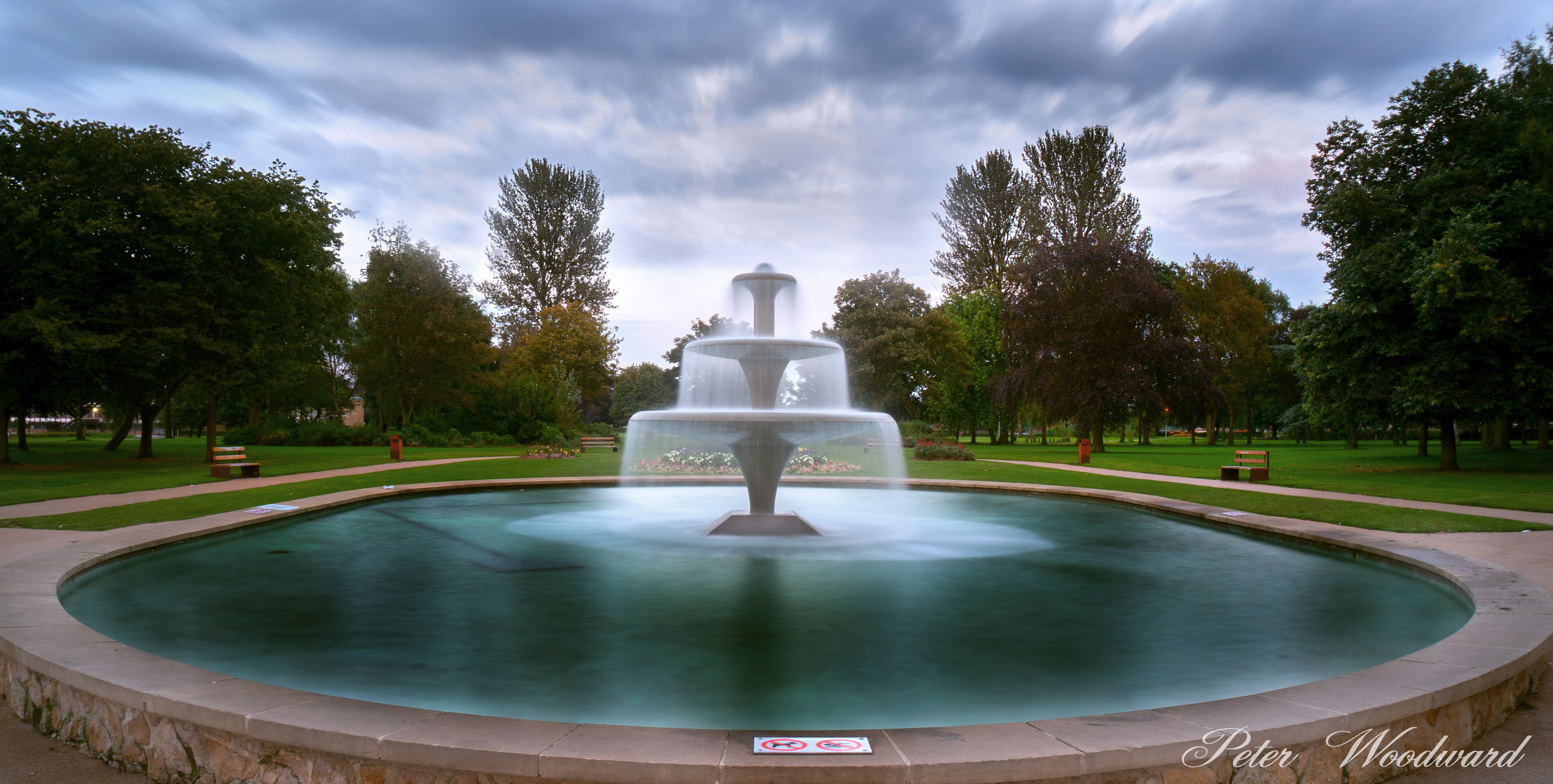
The Fountain at the centre of The Fountain Garden

The centre piece of the park is the fountain garden which is in the middle of a large green open space with footpaths and a variety of specimen trees and flowers.
