= Yaddlethorpe =

Coordinates: 53.553825°N 0.657535°W

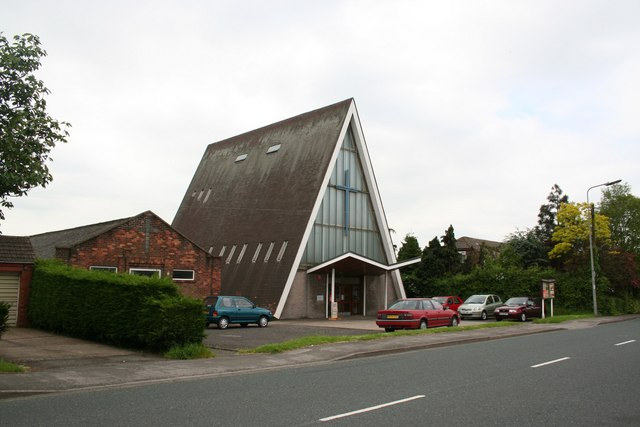
- Yaddlethorpe Methodist Church

- Location within Lincolnshire
- OS grid reference: SE890071
  - London: 145 mi (233 km) S
- Civil parish: Bottesford
- Unitary authority: North Lincolnshire
- Ceremonial county: Lincolnshire
- Region: Yorkshire and the Humber
- Country: England
- Sovereign state: United Kingdom
- Post town: Scunthorpe
- Postcode district: DN17
- Police: Humberside
- Fire: Humberside
- Ambulance: East Midlands
- UK Parliament: Scunthorpe

Yaddlethorpe is a district in the south of Scunthorpe, in the North Lincolnshire district, in the ceremonial county of Lincolnshire, England. It is close to the M180 and next to Bottesford, divided by the A159 road. It is in the civil parish of Bottesford.

== Community ==
The local secondary school is Frederick Gough School on Grange Lane South. Leys Farm Junior School is on Park Avenue. Enderby Road Infants School, despite its name, is on Sunningdale Road.

Local public houses include the Black Beauty on Keddington Road and the Dolphin on Messingham Road.

Local stores are Co-op on Willoughby Road, and Asda on Burringham Road.

== History ==
Yaddlethorpe was formerly a township in the parish of Bottesford, in 1866 Yaddlethorpe became a separate civil parish, on 24 March 1887 the parish was abolished and merged with Bottesford. In 1881 the parish had a population of 168.
