= The Pods =

Recreation centre in Scunthorpe, United Kingdom

Coordinates: 53°34′56″N 0°39′20″W

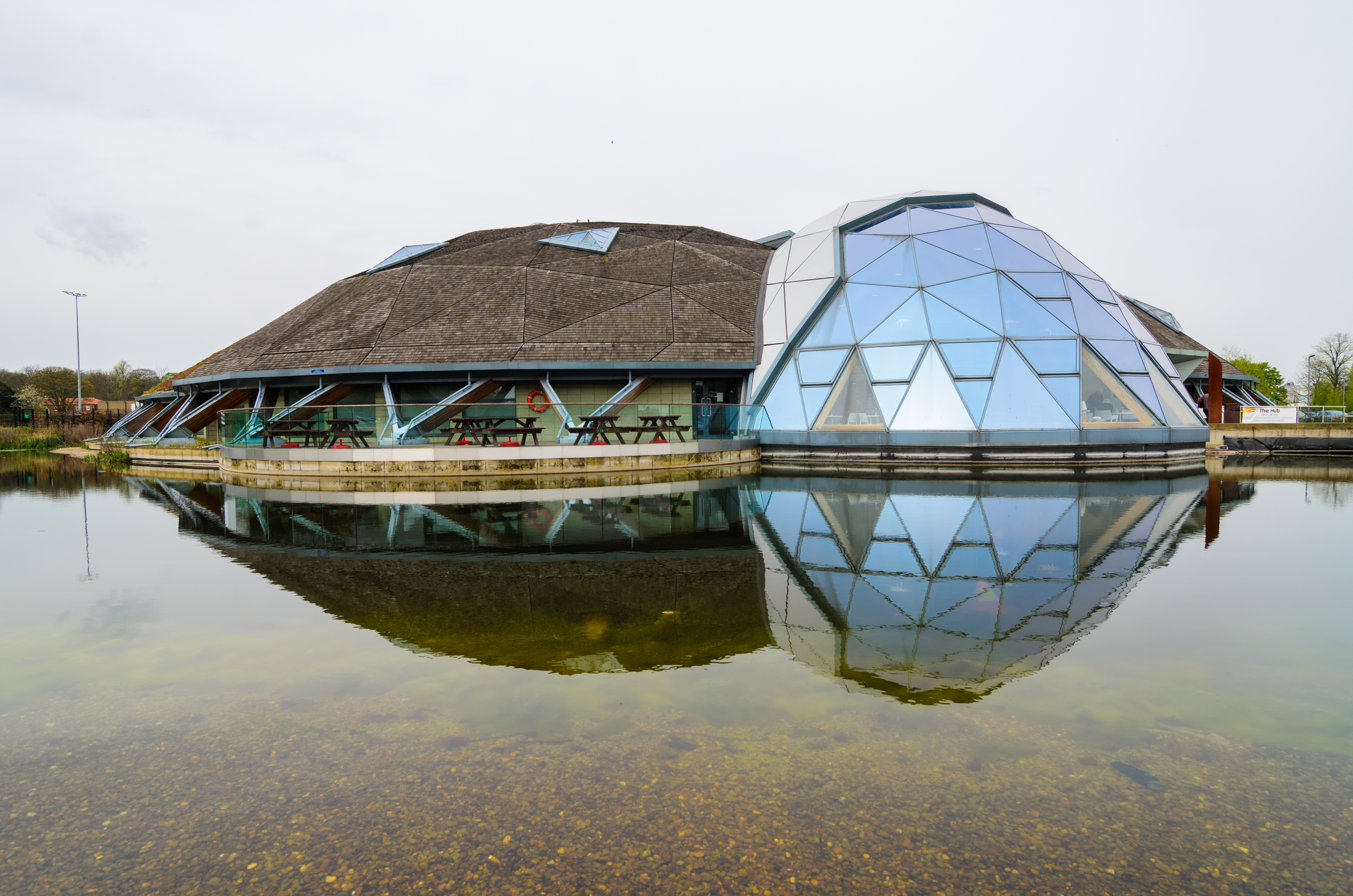
- Interactive map of The Pods
- Location: Scunthorpe, North Lincolnshire, England

Construction
- General contractor: Bowmer and Kirkland

Website
- northlincs.gov.uk/leisure/leisure-centres/the-pods

The Pods is a leisure centre in Scunthorpe, North Lincolnshire, England. The leisure centre offers a wide range of modern facilities, including two swimming pools, a gym, a café and a sports hall. The leisure centre is located in the town's Central Park near Ashby Road.

The Pods is reported to be built the highest environmental standards and is aiming for an 'excellent' BREAAM environmental rating. It has grey water recycling, a bio-mass boiler, and the roof is partly covered with the sedum plants. Hexagonal panels and panes of glass have been used to create the building's dome shaped roofs, which is of a similar style to Cornwall's Eden Project. North Lincolnshire have provided a large pond and car park built next to the leisure centre.

The park and children's play areas around The Pods have also been refurbished in a two million pound restoration, completed in January 2011. Around it there is a park and tennis courts.

== Construction, funding and opening ==
Bowmer and Kirkland won the building contract and started the construction in October 2009. Plans to build the leisure centre were confirmed over two years before the actual start date of construction, but were delayed due to financial issues. Other than the council, the project received funding from Sport England and The National Lottery.

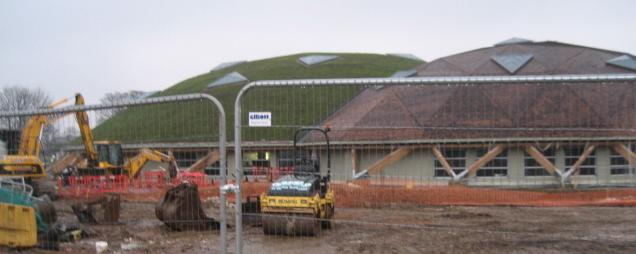
Construction site in February 2011

An accidental explosion in which several contractors working on the site were injured took place on the 17th of June 2011.

The Pods was voted the most sustainable building/development of 2011 at the Property Industry Awards Yorkshire.

== Other ongoing projects to the surrounding area ==
The construction of the leisure centre came with a large wave of other improvements to Scunthorpe. The town's Baths Hall on Doncaster Road underwent a multi-million pound restoration project and the building is capable of holding professional concerts and conferences. The style of the new venue is similar to Grimsby Auditorium.

The town's earlier Leisure Centre in Carlton Road, which was only 27 years old, was demolished before work finished on The Pods. The Carlton road site was sold for commercial development.
