= Andy Shepherd (writer) =

British children's writer

Andy Shepherd is a British writer, known principally for her series of children's novels, The Boy Who Grew Dragons.

== Biography ==
Shepherd grew up on the Essex coast. She studied English and European Thought and Literature at university, subsequently trained as a teacher, then worked for Oxfam before taking up writing (which she had enjoyed as a child) full time. She lives near Cambridge with her family.

== Works ==
=== The Boy Who Grew Dragons series ===
The Boy Who Grew Dragons book cover

The Boy Who Grew Dragons was Shepherd's debut novel. It was short-listed for the Waterstones Children's Book Prize 2019. Shepherd went on to write five other books in the series; all the books are illustrated by Sara Ogilvie. The series follows the adventures of the protagonist, Tomas, and his friends as they deal with the excitement and difficulties of owning dragons that hatch from a dragon-fruit tree in Tomas's grandfather's garden.

- The Boy Who Grew Dragons. London: Piccadilly Press. 14 June 2018. ISBN 978-1-84812-650-3.
- The Boy Who Lived with Dragons. Piccadilly Press. 6 September 2018. ISBN 978-1-84812-681-7.
- The Boy Who Flew with Dragons. Piccadilly Press. 10 January 2019. ISBN 978-1-84812-736-4.
- The Boy Who Dreamed of Dragons. Piccadilly Press. 11 June 2020. ISBN 978-1-84812-926-9.
- The Boy Who Sang with Dragons. Piccadilly Press. 7 January 2021. ISBN 978-1-84812-991-7.
- The Ultimate Guide to Growing Dragons. Piccadilly Press. 15 September 2022. ISBN 978-1-80078-316-4.

The first book in the series was adapted into a song cycle, The Dragon Songs, commissioned by Britten Pears Arts. Scunthorpe Co-operative Junior Choir performed the world premiere of the work in 2022.

=== The Wood Where Magic Grows series ===
In March 2024, The Bookseller reported that Piccadilly Press had commissioned a new series of books from Shepherd, The Wood Where Magic Grows. It will initially comprise two books, with the first planned for publication in July 2025. They will be illustrated by Ellie Snowdon.
