= Scunthorpe Co-operative Junior Choir =

Choir from Scunthorpe, England

- Abbreviation: 'SCJC' or 'Coop Choir'
- Formation: 1923
- Legal status: Registered Charity Number - 1005938
- Region served: Scunthorpe, North Lincolnshire
- Members: 200,000
- Musical Director: Daniel Fields
- Associate Musical Directors: Kathleen Watson & Jenny Trattles
- Accompanists: James Longden, Lynn Robinson & Jean Leong
- Committee Chair: Jacqui Brewster
- Website: www.scunthorpecoopjuniorchoir.org.uk

Scunthorpe Co-operative Junior Choir (SCJC) is a choir from Scunthorpe, England, conducted by Daniel Fields.

Formed almost 100 year ago, the choir is supported by the Co-operative Group. The membership of approximately 200 children is divided into the main choir and two training choirs. All three choirs are open access.

The younger training choir caters for children from 3 – 5 years of age. The choir is led by Jenny Trattles, a former chorister herself. The older training choir welcomes singers from 6 – 9 years of age and is led by former SCJC chorister Kathleen Watson.

The choir has taken part in the Sainsbury's "Choir of the Year" competition on a number of occasions. In 2000, they sang at the opening of the Millennium Dome and travelled to Australia to take part in the 2000 Summer Olympics in Sydney. In 2001, they won the BBC's "Look North" Community Choir competition, and in 2008 featured in the CBBC television programme Take a Bow.

In December 2008 it won BBC Radio 3's "Choir of the Year" competition, against six other finalists. This was under the direction of previous Musical Director Susan Hollingworth who is now ‘Creative Director’ of the choir. As a result, the older members of the main choir were invited to take part in the BBC 2009 Prom series, where they performed Handel's Messiah in Prom 68 along with several other choirs.

In 2011 choristers undertook a tour of Italy, with concerts in Vicolo Porto Bianchi, Sirmione, Piazza Carlotti, and St Mark's Basilica Venice.

In 2012 the choir starred in Cycle Song, a 2012 Cultural Olympiad event, which was awarded the Royal Philharmonic Society Award for Learning and Participation in Spring 2013

In 2018, some members of the main choir travelled to the Black Forest region of Germany. The tour was a great success.

In 2022, Britten Pears Arts invited the organisation to premiere the 2022 Friday Afternoons set of pieces. Composed by Joanna Lee, text by Andy Shepherd, the 12 pieces reflect on the book series, The Boy Who Grew Dragons.
