= Scunthorpe =

Industrial town in Lincolnshire, England

Coordinates: 53.5809°N 0.6502°W

- Town
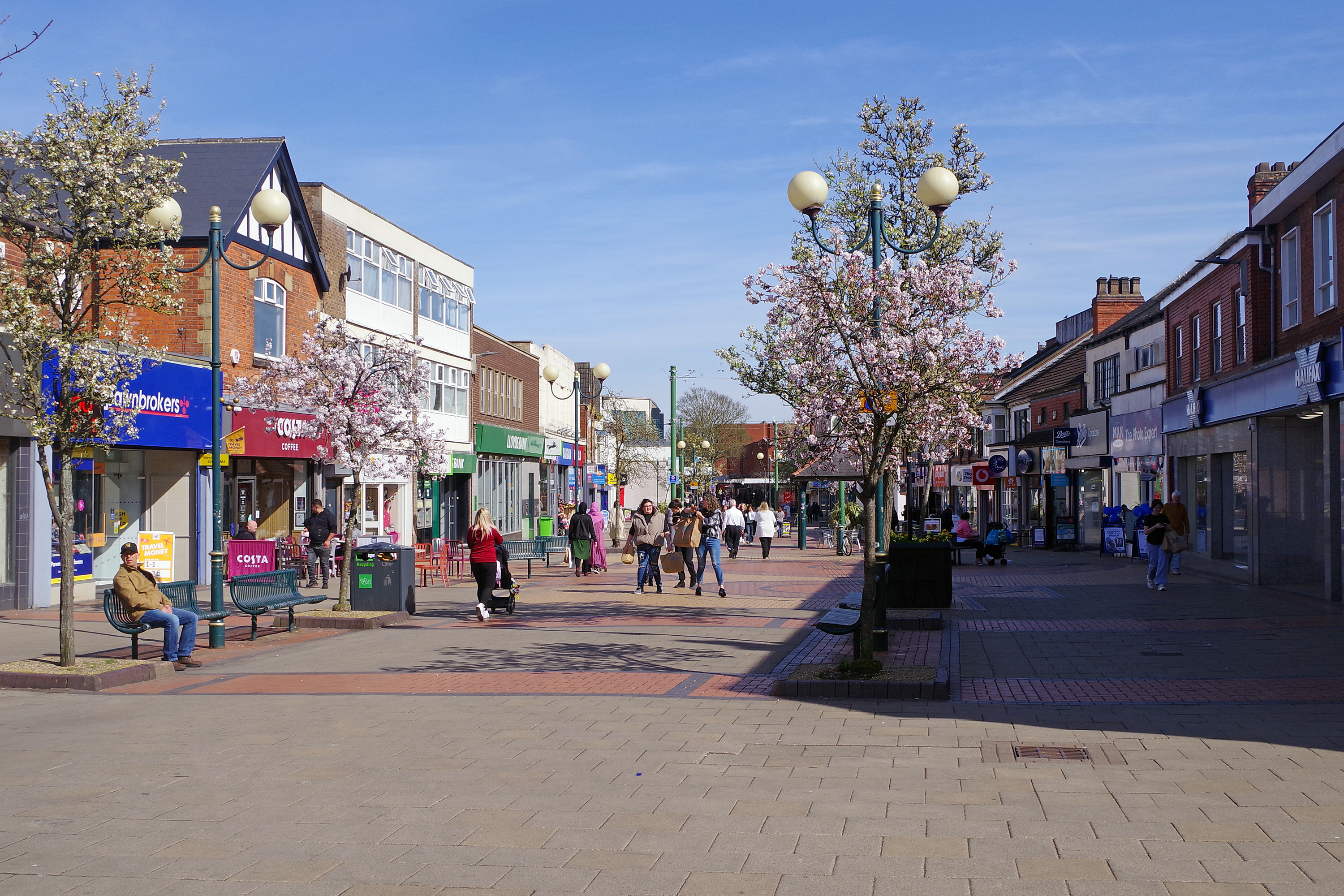
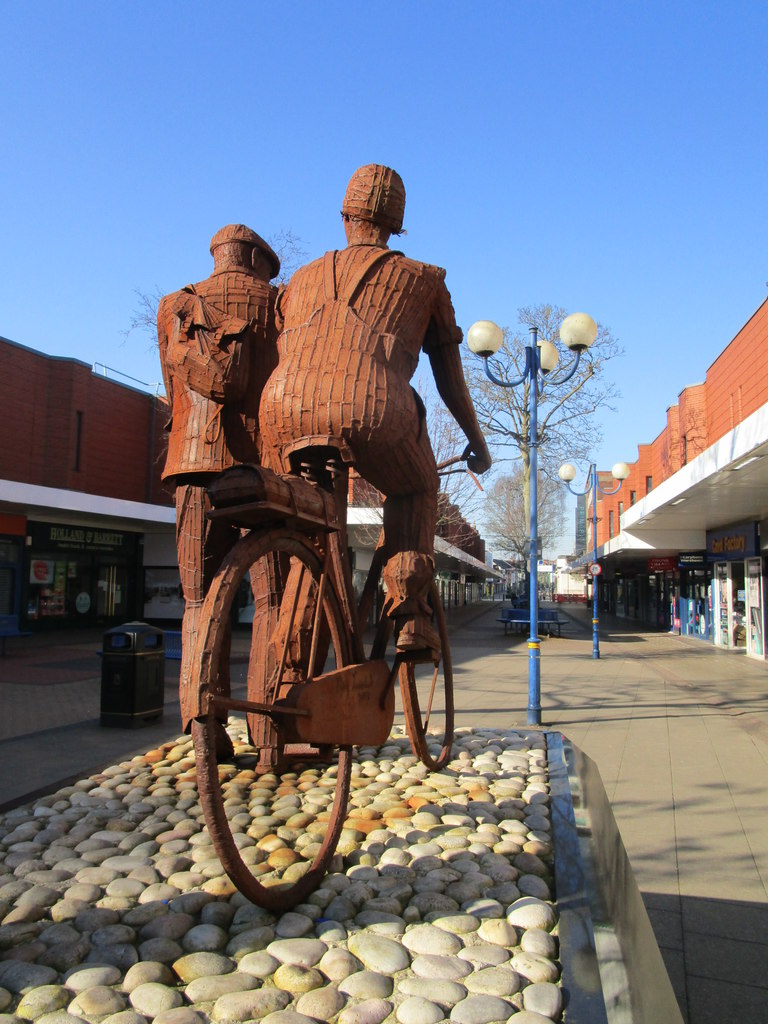
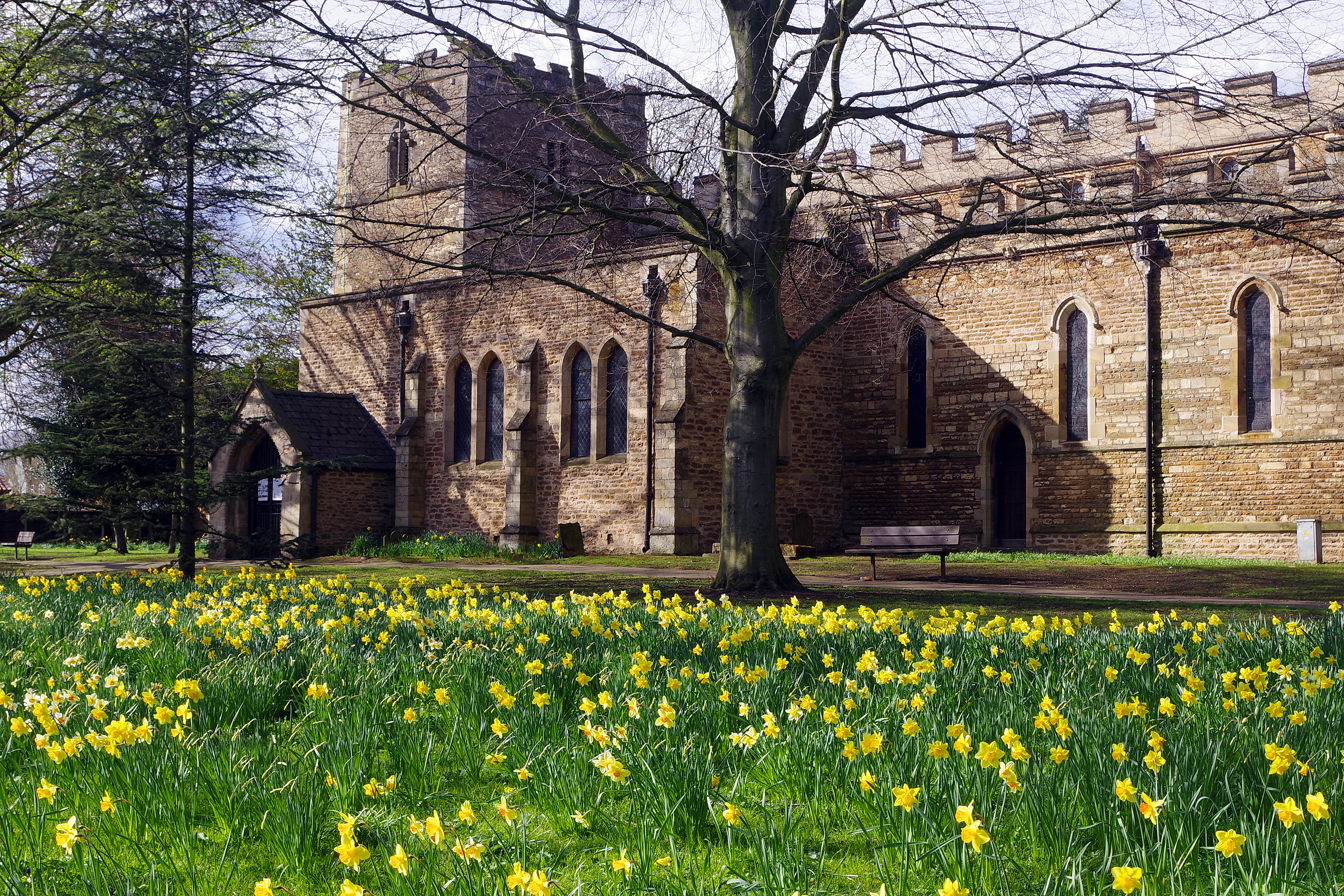
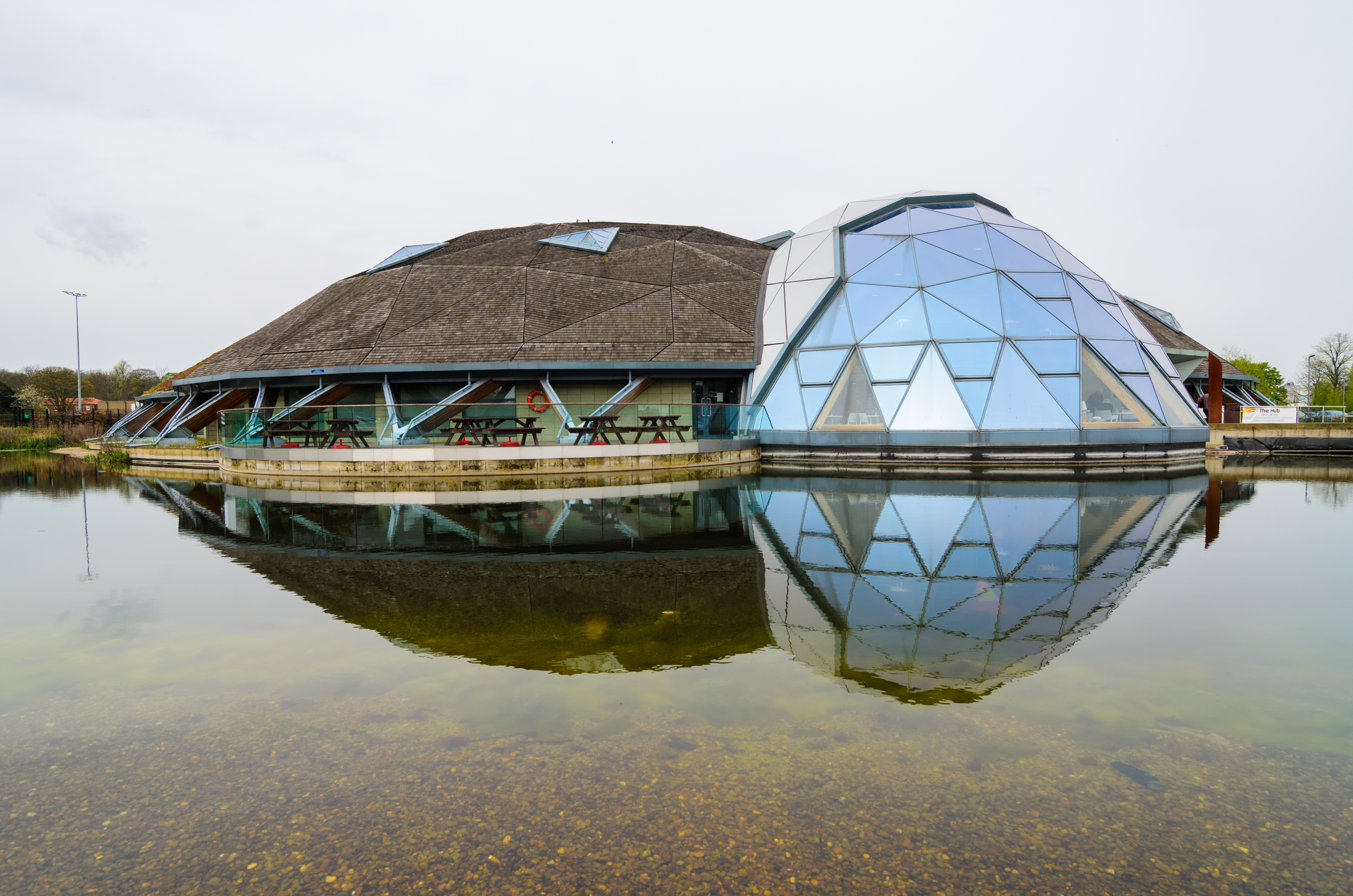
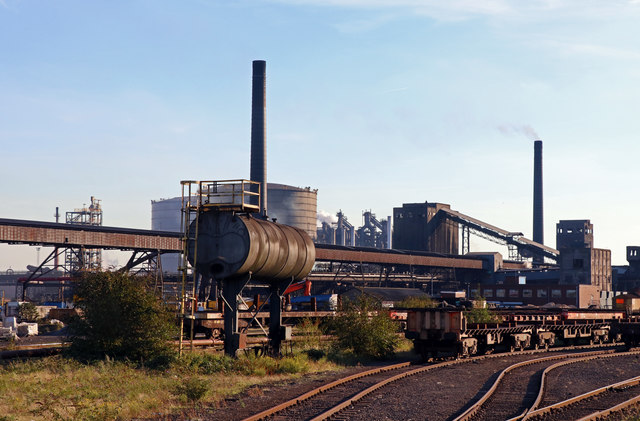
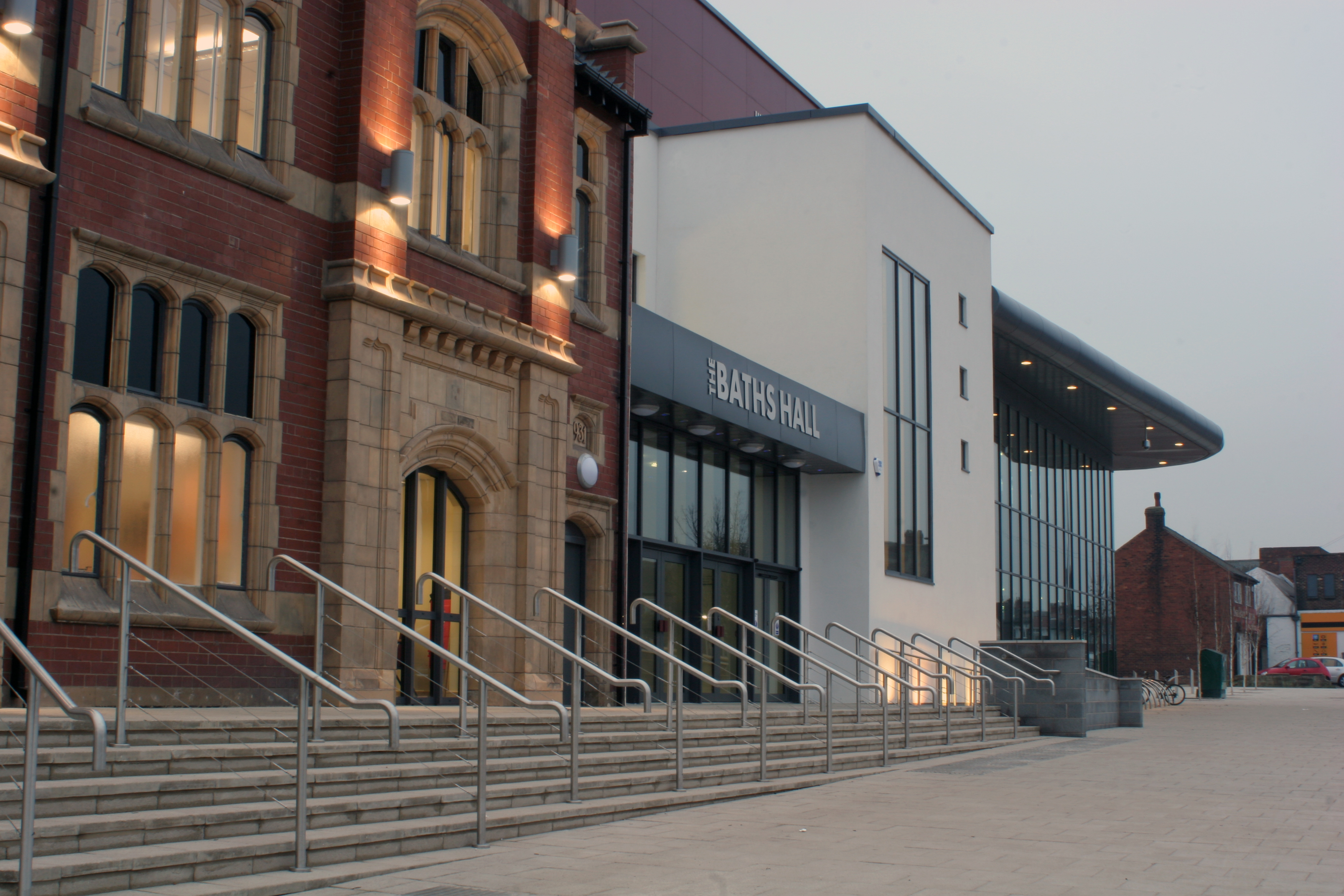
- High Street Sculpture St Lawrence Church The Pods Steelworks Baths Hall

- Location within Lincolnshire
- Population: 81,576 (2021 Census)
- OS grid reference: SE893102
  - London: 145 mi (233 km) S
- Unitary authority: North Lincolnshire
- Ceremonial county: Lincolnshire
- Region: Yorkshire and the Humber
- Country: England
- Sovereign state: United Kingdom
- Areas of the town (2011 census BUASD): List: Ashby; Bottesford (Town); Bottesford Moor; Brumby; Crosby; Dragonby; Frodingham; High Santon; Raventhorpe; Yaddlethorpe
- Post town: SCUNTHORPE
- Postcode district: DN15 – 17
- Dialling code: 01724
- Police: Humberside
- Fire: Humberside
- Ambulance: East Midlands
- UK Parliament: Scunthorpe
- Website: https://www.northlincs.gov.uk/

Scunthorpe (/ˈskʌnθɔːrp/) is an industrial town in Lincolnshire, England, and the county's third most populous settlement after Lincoln and Grimsby, with a population of 81,286 in 2021. It is the administrative centre and largest settlement of the North Lincolnshire district. Scunthorpe lies north of Lincoln and is between Grimsby to the east and Doncaster to the west, while Hull is to the north-east via the Humber Bridge.

== Toponymy ==
The town appears in the Domesday Book of 1086 as Escumesthorpe, which is from the Old Norse Skumasþorp meaning "Skuma's homestead", a site which is believed to be in the town centre, close to Market Hill. Today Skuma’s homestead means "A secondary settlement, a dependent outlying farmstead or hamlet".

== History ==
Scunthorpe as a town came into existence due to the exploitation of the local ironstone which began in 1859; iron production commenced in 1864, steel smelting in 1891.

Scunthorpe's population grew from 1,245 in 1851 to 11,167 in 1901 and 45,840 in 1941. The boundaries of Scunthorpe expanded to include the former villages of Bottesford, Yaddlethorpe, Frodingham, Crosby, Brumby and Ashby. Scunthorpe became an urban district in 1891, merged as 'Scunthorpe, Brumby and Frodingham Urban District' in 1919, and became a municipal borough in 1936. Scunthorpe was originally dominated, socially, politically and culturally, by Rowland Winn, the most significant landowner in the district. By the First World War local working class culture, drawing on trade unions and the Labour Party had emerged to challenge the Conservative Party's hegemony.

== Geology ==
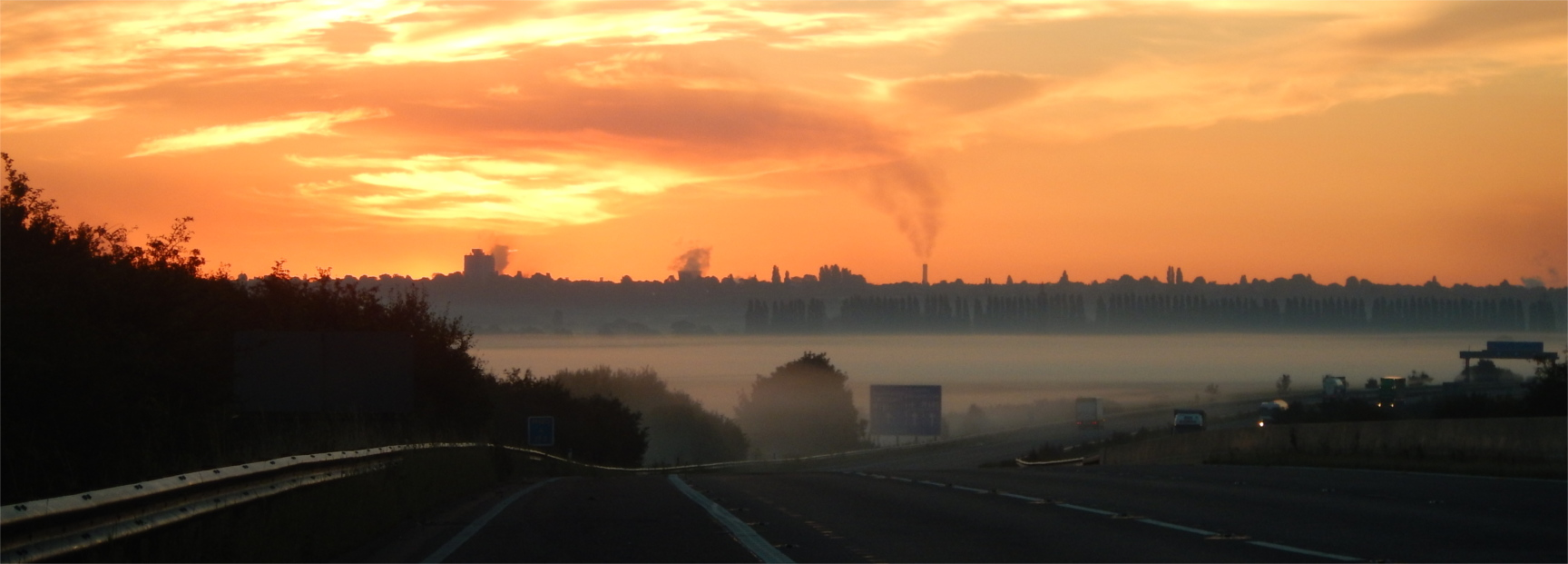
The skyline of Scunthorpe, August 2016

Scunthorpe is located close to an outcrop of high-lime-content ironstone (~25% iron average) from a seam of the Lias Group strata which dates from the Early Jurassic period and runs north–south through Lincolnshire. Ironstone was mined by open cast methods from the 1850s onwards, and by underground mining from the late 1930s. In the 1970s the steel industry in Scunthorpe began to use of ores imported from outside the UK with higher iron content. Underground mining in the area ceased in 1981.

Scunthorpe was close to the epicentre (at Middle Rasen) of the 2008 Market Rasen earthquake, the second largest earthquake experienced in the British Isles, which had a magnitude of 5.2. Significant shocks were felt in Scunthorpe and the North Lincolnshire vicinity. The main 10-second quake, which struck at 00:56 GMT on 27 February 2008, at a depth of 9.6 mi (15.4 km), was second only to a 1984 quake, with a magnitude of 5.4, in North Wales.

== Governance ==
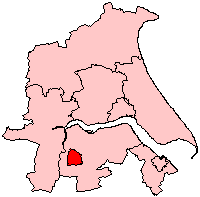
Scunthorpe within Humberside (1974–1996)

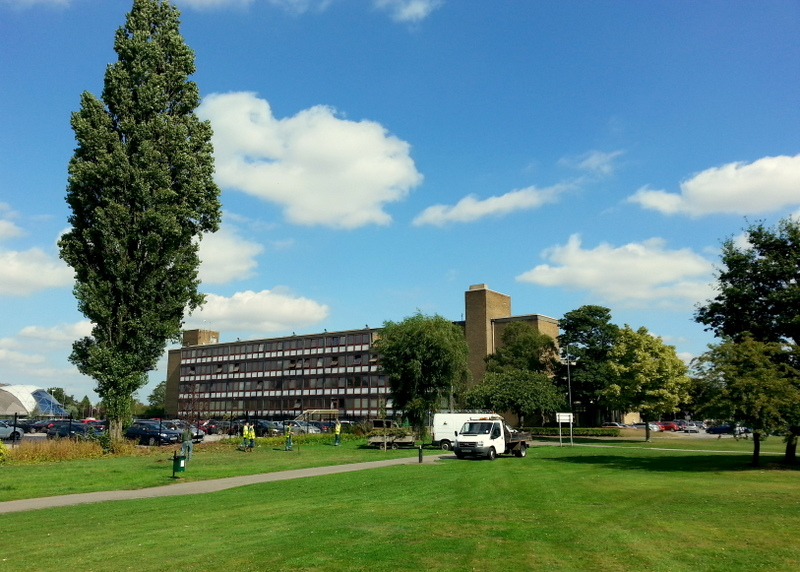
The former Scunthorpe Civic Centre

Scunthorpe forms an unparished area located within the borough and unitary authority of North Lincolnshire. The town forms seven of the borough's nineteen wards, namely Ashby Central, Ashby Lakeside, Brumby, Crosby & Park, Frodingham, Kingsway with Lincoln Gardens and Town. The Scunthorpe wards elect 16 of the borough's 43 councillors. As of 2025, 27 are members of the Conservative party, and 16 are members of the Labour party. The councillors form the charter trustees of the Town of Scunthorpe and they continue to elect a town mayor.

North Lincolnshire Council was based in Scunthorpe Civic Centre off Ashby Road (former A159) next to Festival Gardens. It was designed by Charles B. Pearson, Son and Partners and was completed in 1962. It was the home of Scunthorpe Borough Council until 1996. It was named Pittwood House after Edwin Pittwood, a local Labour politician, who worked in the opencast ironstone workings near Normanby Park.

=== Civic history ===
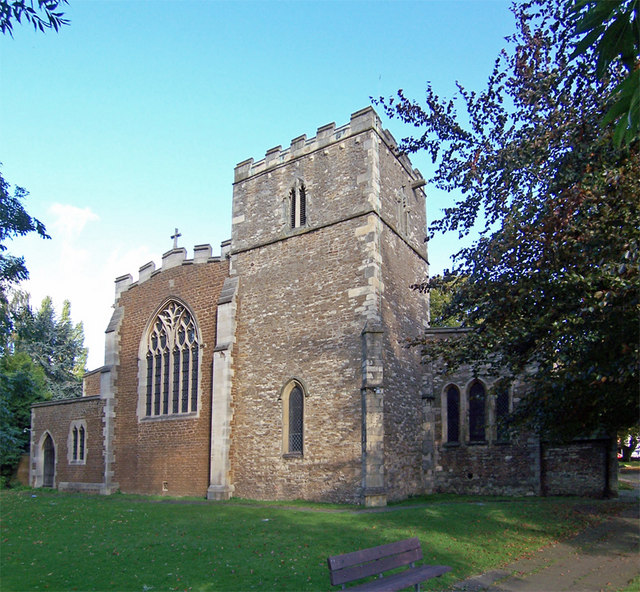
Church of St. Lawrence

In 1889, the area was included in the Lincolnshire, Parts of Lindsey administrative county. Separate local government began in 1890 when the Scunthorpe local board of health was formed. In 1894 the local board was replaced with an urban district council. At the same time the neighbouring townships of Brumby and Frodingham were also constituted an urban district. The two urban districts were amalgamated, along with the parishes of Crosby and Ashby in 1919 to form an enlarged Scunthorpe urban district. Scunthorpe received a charter incorporating the town as a municipal borough in 1936.

Local authority boundary changes brought the town into the new county of Humberside in 1974, and a new non-metropolitan district, the Borough of Scunthorpe was formed with the same boundaries as the old municipal borough. The opening of the Humber Bridge on 24 June 1981 provided a permanent link between North and South Humberside but did not secure Humberside's future. To the relief of its many detractors, the county of Humberside (and Humberside County Council) was abolished on 1 April 1996 and succeeded by four unitary authorities.

The previous Humberside districts of Glanford and Scunthorpe, and that part of Boothferry district south of the northern boundaries of the parishes of Crowle, Eastoft, Luddington, Haldenby and Amcotts, now compose the unitary authority of North Lincolnshire. On amalgamation charter trustees were formed for Scunthorpe, and they continue to elect a town mayor.

Arms of former municipal borough of Scunthorpe

=== Coat of arms ===
When Scunthorpe was incorporated as a borough in 1936, it also received a grant of a coat of arms from the College of Arms. These arms were transferred to the new borough council formed in 1974, and are now used by the town's charter trustees.

The green shield and golden wheatsheaf recall that the area was until recently agricultural in nature. Across the centre of the shield is a length of chain. This refers to the five villages of Crosby, Scunthorpe, Frodingham, Brumby & Ashby linking together as one. At the top of the shield are two fossils of the species Gryphaea incurva. These remains of oysters, known as the "devil's toenails", were found in the rock strata from which ironstone was quarried. The crest, on top of the helm, shows a blast furnace. This is also referred to in the Latin motto: Refulget labores nostros coelum or The heavens reflect our labours popularly attributed to the glow observed in the night sky from the steelmaking activities.

== Geography ==
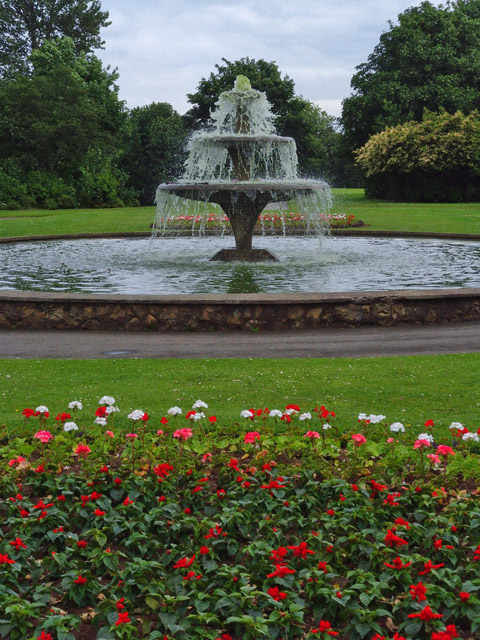
Central Park

Scunthorpe lies on an escarpment of ridged land (the Lincoln Cliff) which slopes down towards the Trent. The surrounding environs are largely low-lying hills and plains. Although the town itself is heavily industrial it is surrounded by fertile farmland and wooded areas. In terms of general location it lies a mile east of the River Trent, 8 miles (13 km) south of the Humber Estuary, 15 miles (24 km) west of the Lincolnshire Wolds and 25 miles (40 km) north of Lincoln. The town is situated at the terminus of the M181, 42 miles (68 km) from Sheffield. Nearby towns and cities are Hull (18 miles northeast), Doncaster (20 miles west), Grimsby (22 miles east) and York (46 miles northwest). Scunthorpe is approximately 10 miles (16 km) east of South Yorkshire and 8 miles (13 km) south by south west to the East Riding of Yorkshire.

=== Climate ===
Like most of the United Kingdom, Scunthorpe has an oceanic climate (Köppen: Cfb).

Average temperatures are around 20 °C (68 °F) in the summer, and can be as low as −2 °C (28 °F) in the winter.

=== Suburban areas ===
Notable suburban areas of Scunthorpe are Ashby, Crosby, Frodingham and Yaddlethorpe. The town of Bottesford forms part of the built-up area.

== Economy ==
=== Steel industry ===
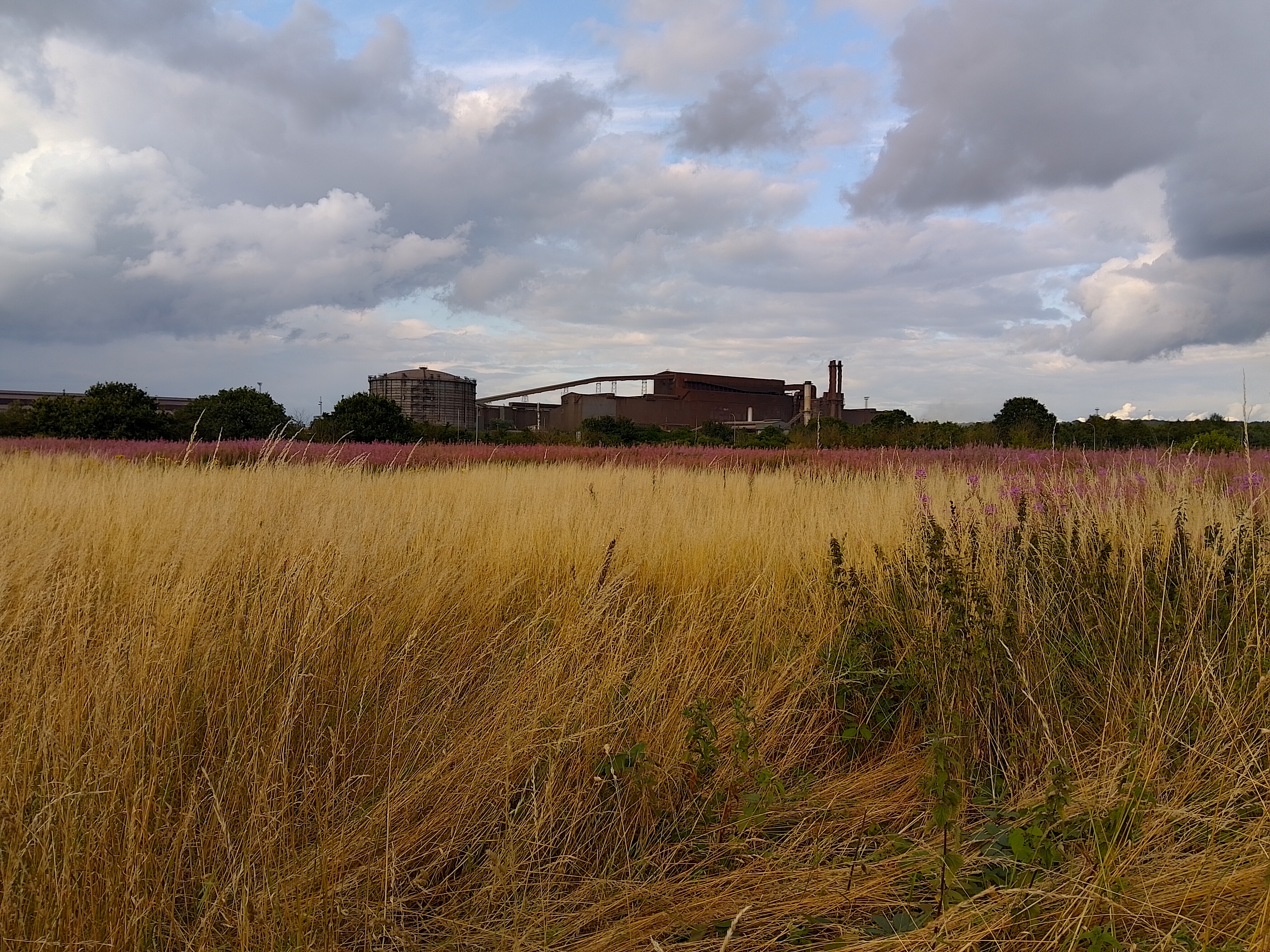
Scunthorpe steelworks

The Iron industry in Scunthorpe was established in the mid 19th century, following the discovery and exploitation of middle Lias ironstone east of Scunthorpe. Initially iron ore was exported to iron producers in South Yorkshire. Later, after the construction of the Trent, Ancholme and Grimsby Railway (1860s) gave rail access to the area iron production in the area rapidly expanded using local ironstone and imported coal or coke. Rapid industrial expansion in the area led directly to the development of the town of Scunthorpe, eventually incorporating several other former hamlets and villages, in a formerly sparsely populated entirely agricultural area.

From the early 1910s to the 1930s the industry consolidated, with three main ownership concerns formed – the Appleby-Frodingham Steel Company, part of the United Steel Companies; the Redbourn Iron Works, part of Richard Thomas and Company of South Wales (later Richard Thomas and Baldwins); and John Lysaght's Normanby Iron Works, part of Guest, Keen and Nettlefolds.

In 1967 all three works became part of the nationalised British Steel Corporation (BSC), leading to a period of further consolidation – from the 1970s the use of local or regional ironstone diminished, being replaced by imported ore via the Immingham Bulk Terminal. Conversion to the Linz-Donawitz process (or "basic oxygen" process) of steel making from the open hearth process took place from the late 1960s onwards and was complete by the 1990s. Both the Normanby Park and the Redbourn works closed in the early 1980s.

Following privatisation in 1988 the company, together with the rest of BSC, became part of Corus (1999), later Tata Steel Europe (2007). In 2016 the long products division of Tata Steel Europe was sold to Greybull Capital with Scunthorpe as the primary steel production site.

In May 2019, after a drop in future orders, and a breakdown in rescue talks between the government and the company's owner, Greybull, British Steel Limited entered insolvency.

Industries associated with the steelworks include metal engineering as well as a BOC plant.

=== Other industries ===
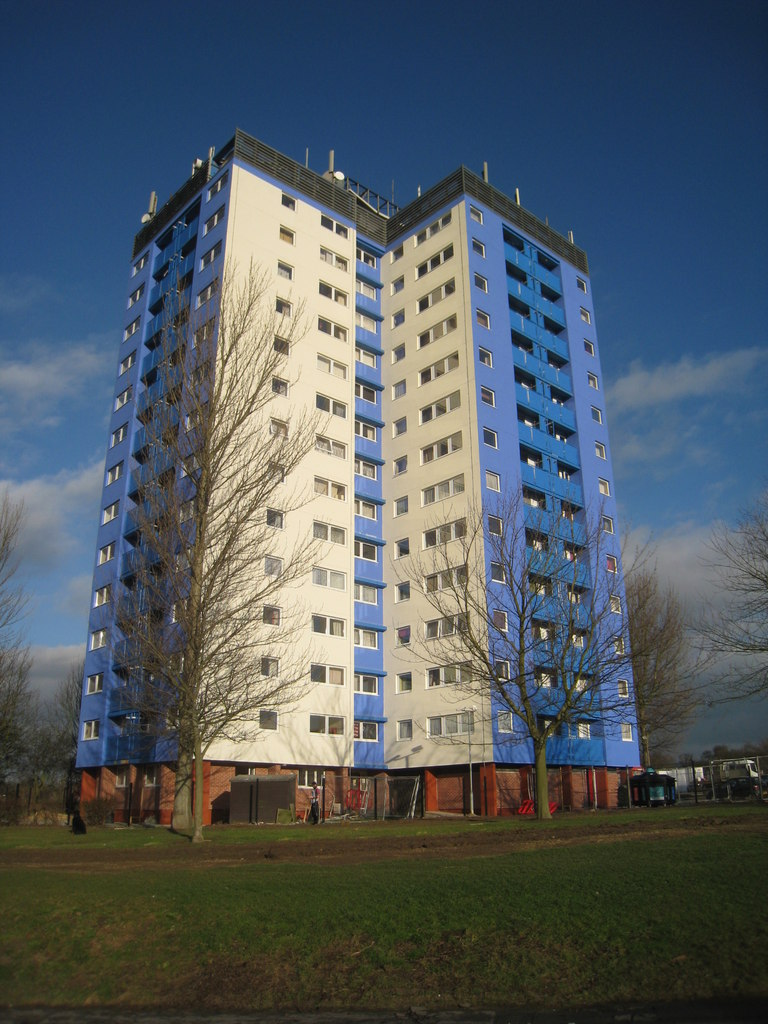
Trent View House Flats

Although the historical predominance of the steel industry made Scunthorpe a virtual monotown, there are other industries in the town. These include food production, distribution and retailing. North of the town next a waste management firm, Bell Waste Control, which services the majority of industry in Scunthorpe and the surrounding areas. On the Foxhills Industrial Park, north of the A1077 northern bypass, are many distribution companies, notably a large building owned by the Nisa co-operative type mutual organisation which has its UK headquarters there. Also on the Foxhills Industrial Park is a 500,000 square foot factory occupied by Wren Kitchens, employing 350 full-time workers.

2 Sisters Food Group have a large chicken processing plant in the town. Key Country Foods produces meat products on an industrial scale. The Sauce Company produces sauces, soups and other foodstuffs for the catering and supermarket sectors. In 1947, Riley's Crisps was created in the town, moving to Colin Road before becoming Sooner Snacks in 1981. The factory is still operational manufacturing Golden Wonder crisps. Ericsson Mobile Platforms produces printed circuit boards for the telecommunications industry. There are a number of other firms, mostly involved in manufacturing and light engineering.

In the 2001 census 19.3% of the working age population were economically inactive.

=== Retail ===
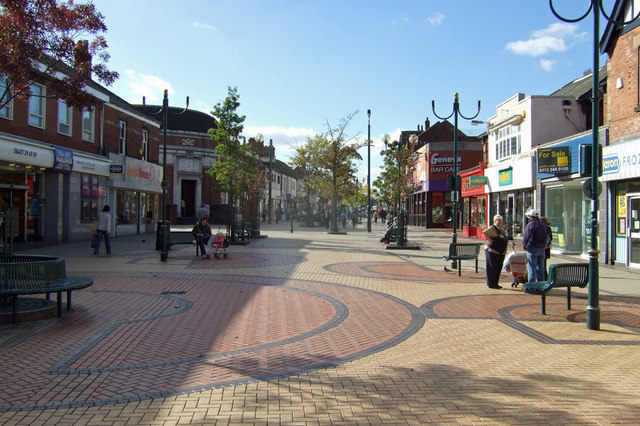
High Street

Scunthorpe has two major shopping centres, effectively a single site: the Foundry Shopping Centre and the Parishes Centre. The former was constructed in the late 1960s/early 1970s during a wholesale reconstruction of the old town; the latter was constructed in the early part of the 2000s decade on the site of the town's old bus station. There are also many well known retailers on High Street. On 6 January 2011 Marks and Spencer closed their High Street store after 80 years of trading, but a new Marks and Spencer store opened near the football ground in 2014.

However the size of the remaining retail units reflects the size of the area's population and with larger shopping facilities within reasonable travelling distance in Grimsby, Hull, Doncaster, Lincoln, Leeds and at Meadowhall, Sheffield.

The once-thriving market, mostly under cover in market halls just to the north of the Central Library, at the eastern end of the High Street, had shrunk noticeably in the last ten years, and has now moved to the new St John's Market, close to the Bus Station. The opening date was 22 March 2019.

All of the big food retailers are represented in the area. There is a Tesco Extra, and an Aldi (in the former Toys R Us unit) opposite the football ground, while Sainsbury's (formerly a Safeway) have their store on the site of the old Scunthorpe United stadium, The Old Show Ground. Morrisons have a store at the bottom of Mortal Ash Hill (known locally as "Motlash") (A18 road) at the Lakeside Retail Park, on the eastern entrance to the town, while Asda have a store on Burringham Road. In 2011 Asda opened another store in the former Netto, on Carlton Street.

The Middletons Music Store on Oswald Road closed in November 1998, formerly owned by Roy Havercroft of Messingham. Conversion began in January 1999 to become a Wetherspoons, to cost £1.1m. It was opened on Wednesday 18 August 1999 by Tim Martin.

== Transport ==
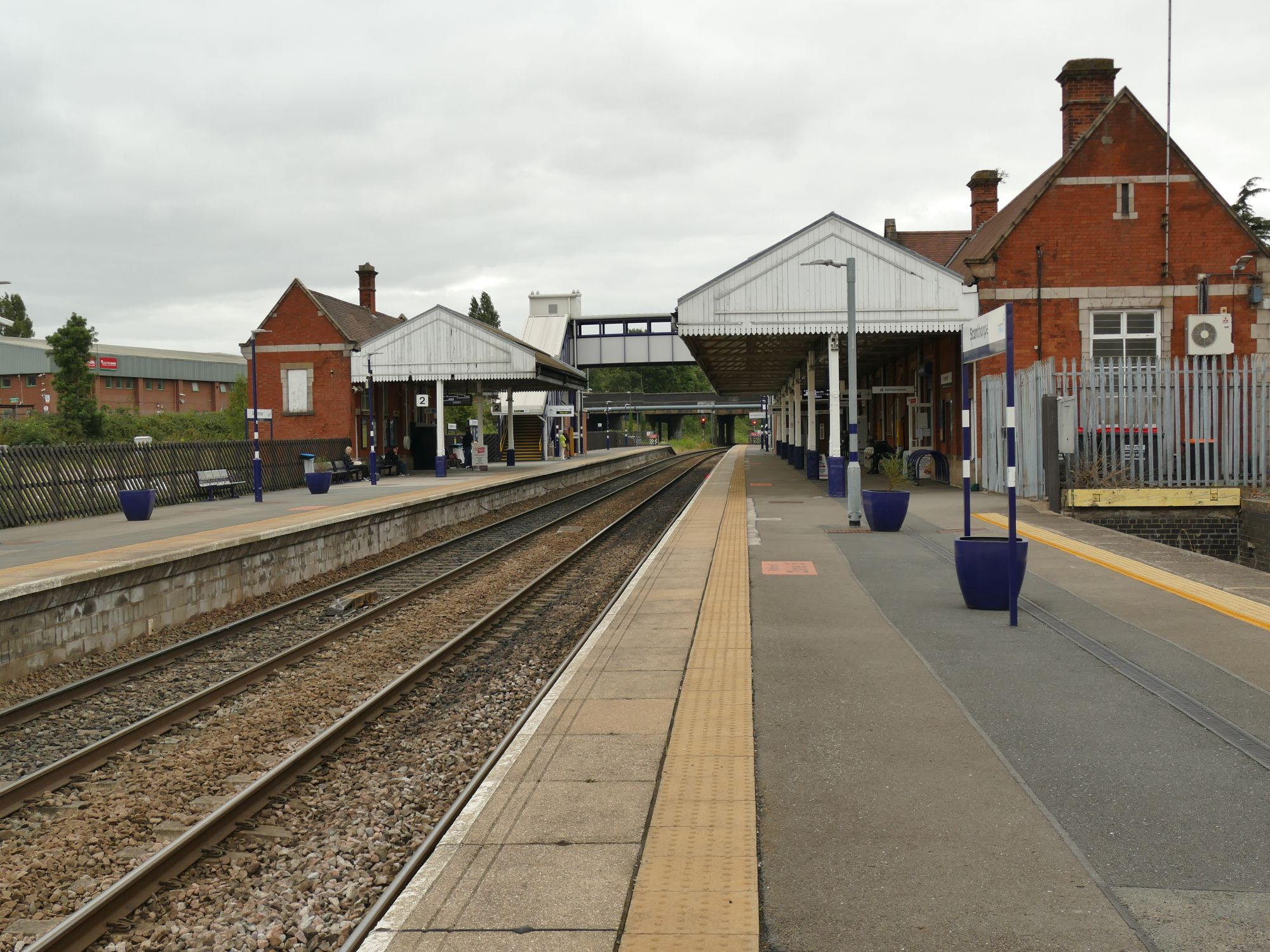
Scunthorpe Railway station

Scunthorpe railway station is on the South TransPennine Line and has two platforms serviced by the train companies, TransPennine Express and Northern Trains. TransPennine Express eastbound trains to Cleethorpes call at platform 1, whilst TransPennine Express westbound services to Liverpool Lime Street and the Northern westbound stopping service to Doncaster use platform 2.

The M180 passes four miles (6.4 km) south of Scunthorpe and connects to the town via the M181 and the A1077M. Before the M180 was opened in 1979, all east–west traffic took the A18 over Keadby Bridge. Humberside Airport is a short drive to the east along the M180. The town's bus station off Fenton Street is predominantly used by Stagecoach in Lincolnshire which operates services within and out of the town along with Hornsby Travel. East Yorkshire operate services to Hull and Goole.

== Demographics ==
According to the 2021 Census, Scunthorpe had a population of 81,286, while the urban area, which extends to the nearby village of Messingham to the south of the town, had a population of 84,665.

At the 2021 Census, the local population was recorded as being 90.4% White British, with 6% British Asian, 1.4% Mixed-race British, 1.2% Other ethnic minorities and 0.8% Black British, making the town roughly 90% White and 10% BAME. According to the census, the town's religious composition was 51% Christian, followed by 42.1% who were non-religious and 5% following Islam. Other religions and not stated respondents were recorded at 2.9%.

Scunthorpe is also home to the largest British Asian community in the county of Lincolnshire, followed by both Lincoln and Grimsby.

== Culture ==
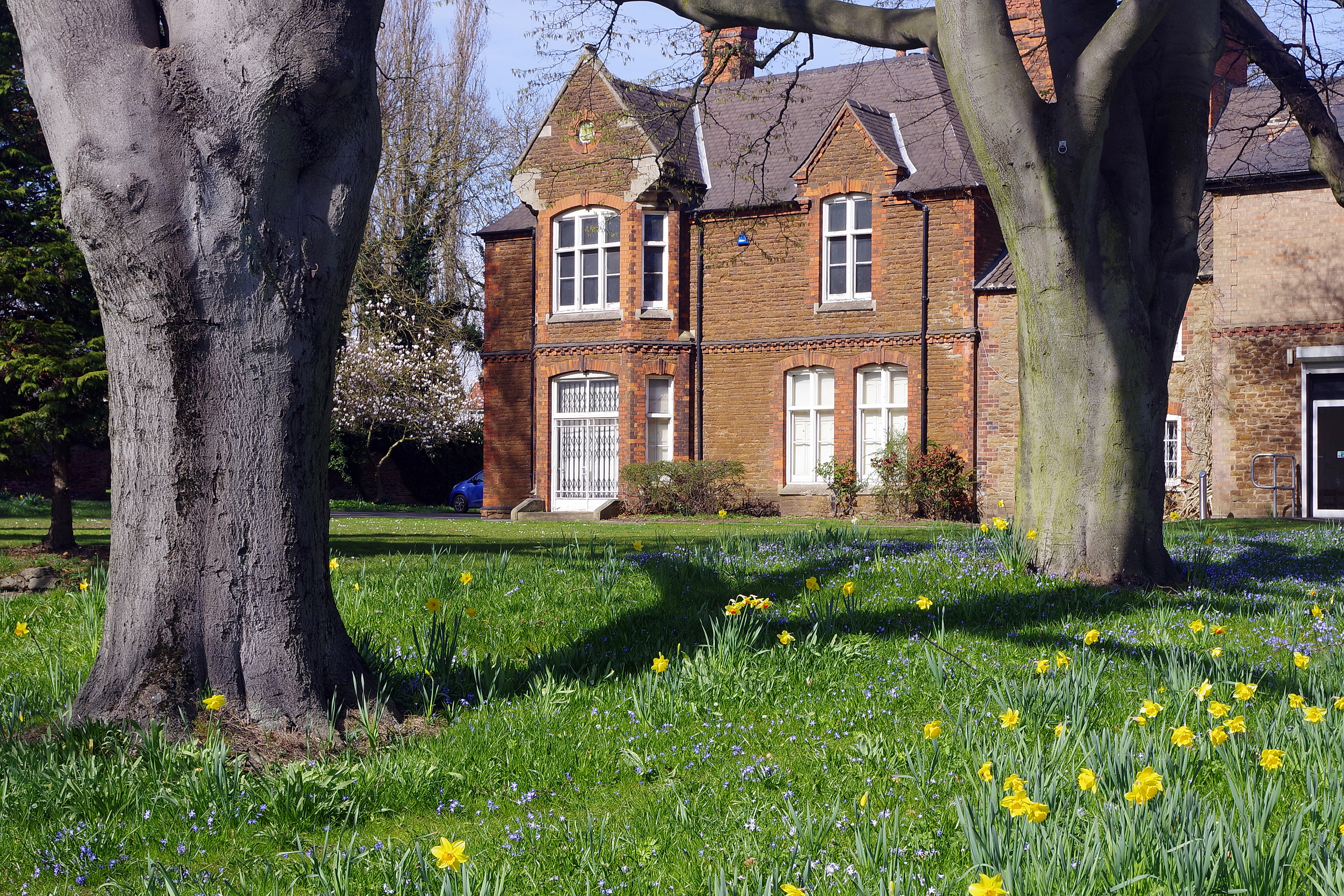
The North Lincolnshire Museum

The North Lincolnshire Museum is on Oswald Road, near the railway station. The former church of St John the Evangelist is now the 20–21 Visual Arts Centre. The Plowright Theatre, named after Joan Plowright, is on Laneham Street (off the west end of High Street and also near the railway station). It was built in 1958 as Scunthorpe Civic Theatre. The Baths Hall, reopened in 2011, a 1,700 capacity venue also hosts visiting musical and theatrical events.

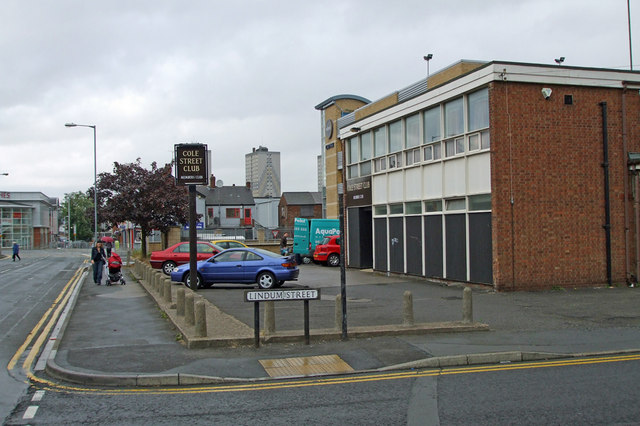
The Cole Street Club

The Scunthorpe Co-operative Junior Choir from Scunthorpe won the title of BBC Radio 3 Choir of the Year 2008 at the Grand Finals on 7 December 2008 at the Royal Festival Hall, London. The main choir is made up of 90 members aged between 9 and 19 years whilst also having two training choirs taking children as young as 3 years old. They have made several CDs, performed numerous concerts in the area and further afield, have been subject of documentaries and are internationally renowned as having travelled the world.

Scunthorpe was the setting of a 2012 Cultural Olympiad community opera called Cycle Song, about past steel-worker and Olympic cyclist Lal White. It was composed by Tim Sutton and the librettist was Ian McMillan. The Scunthorpe Co-operative Junior Choir, Proper Job Theatre Company and over a thousand locals participated.

== Media and entertainment ==
=== Television ===
- BBC Look North broadcast by the BBC from Queen's Gardens in Kingston upon Hull covering the East Riding of Yorkshire and most of Lincolnshire
- Calendar, broadcast by ITV Yorkshire from Leeds, West Yorkshire with a crew in Grimsby covering the local area.

=== Radio ===
- BBC Radio Humberside is broadcast on 95.9 FM from Hull, with its coverage given to the old county of Humberside, now including the East Riding of Yorkshire and all of North and North East Lincolnshire as well as Lincolnshire at certain times. Coverage often includes broadcasts of local football team Scunthorpe United.
- Greatest Hits Radio Lincolnshire broadcasts on 102.2 FM from Lincoln, covering the whole of Lincolnshire including the Scunthorpe area.
- Hits Radio East Yorkshire & North Lincolnshire broadcasts on 96.9 FM from Hull, having some of its coverage given to North Lincolnshire, which includes Scunthorpe.

=== Print ===
The local newspaper is the Scunthorpe Telegraph (formerly the Scunthorpe Evening Telegraph) with an online version at www.scunthorpetelegraph.co.uk.

=== Venues ===
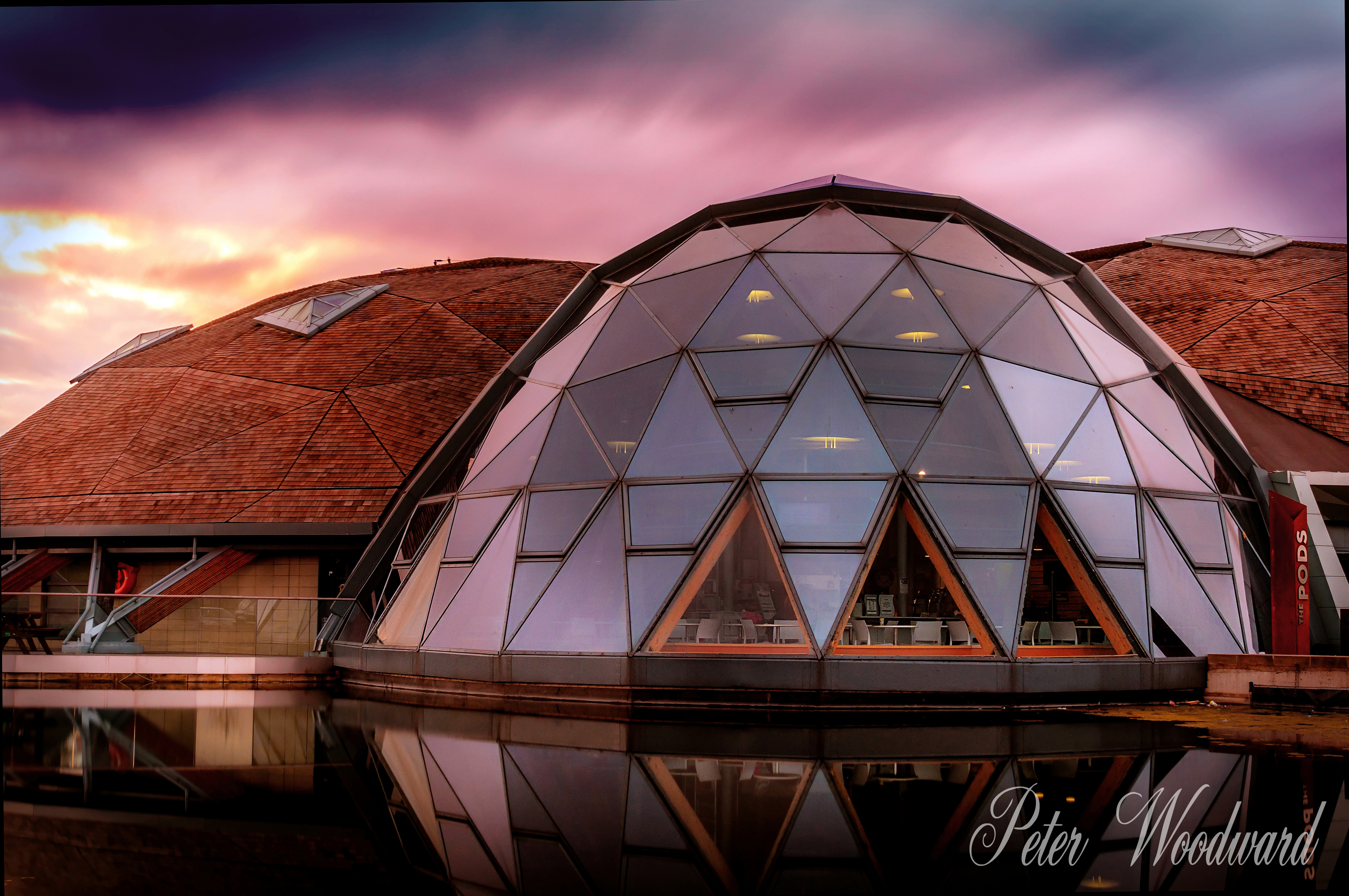
The Pods

Scunthorpe has a leisure centre (The Pods) next to Pittwood House, museum, galleries, craft centres, several clubs, pubs and bars, a Vue multiplex cinema adjacent to the bus station. The Baths Hall in Doncaster Road was a popular music venue, before it was closed because of the costs of bringing the building up to scratch, and dealing with industrial contamination on site. The Labour Council prevented the Baths from being demolished in 2007 and commenced a major rebuild of the venue, which has involved demolishing all but the facade of the building. The building re-opened in November 2011.

== Education ==
=== Primary schools ===
Primary schools include: Frodingham Infant School; Scunthorpe CofE Primary School; Oasis Academy Henderson Avenue; Bushfield Road Infant School; Crosby Primary School; Saint Augustine Webster Catholic Voluntary Academy; Berkeley Primary School; Oasis Academy Parkwood; Lincoln Gardens Primary School; Priory Lane Community School; St. Bernadette's Catholic Primary Voluntary Academy; Westcliffe Primary School; The Grange Primary School; Oakfield Primary School; Willoughby Road Primary Academy; Enderby Road Infant School; Leys Farm Junior School; St Peter and St Paul CofE Primary School; and Holme Valley Primary School.

=== Secondary schools ===
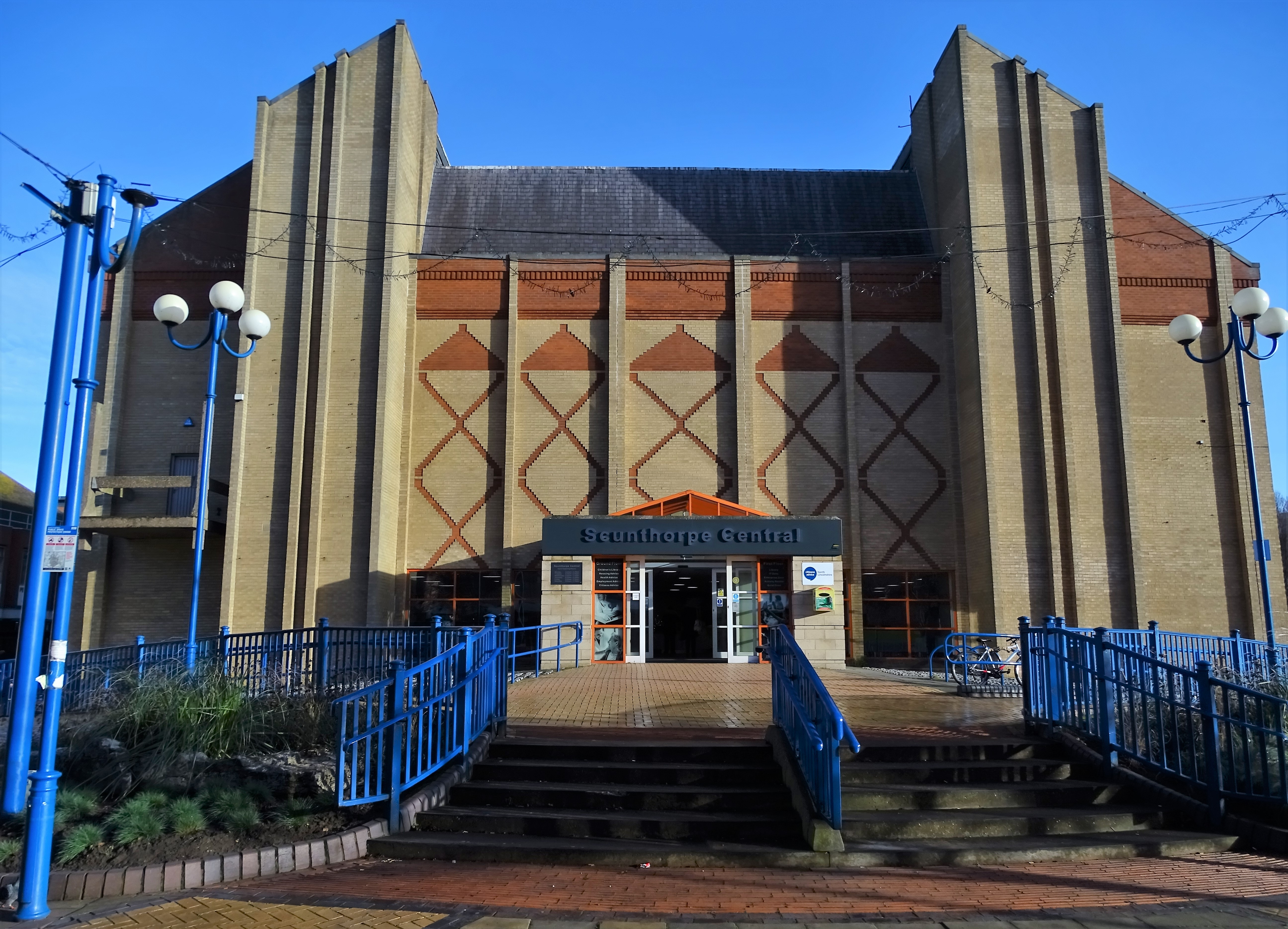
North Lincolnshire Central Library

Secondary schools within Scunthorpe include: The St Lawrence Academy; Engineering UTC Northern Lincolnshire; Outwood Academy Brumby; Outwood Academy Foxhills; Melior Community Academy; St Bede's Catholic Voluntary Academy; and Frederick Gough School.

=== Further education ===
John Leggott Sixth-Form College (JLC) is on West Common Lane and North Lindsey College is close by on Kingsway (A18). The University Campus North Lincolnshire, located in the former Scunthorpe Civic Centre, offers undergraduate courses to approximately 1,500 students.

=== SEN Schools ===
There are three schools within this category: St Luke's Primary School; St Hugh's Special School; and Trent View College.

== Law and order ==
The area is served by Humberside Police. According to Home Office data the area has crime rates higher than the national average, especially in the categories of violence against the person, sexual offences, burglary and theft of motor vehicles.

== Sport ==
=== Football ===
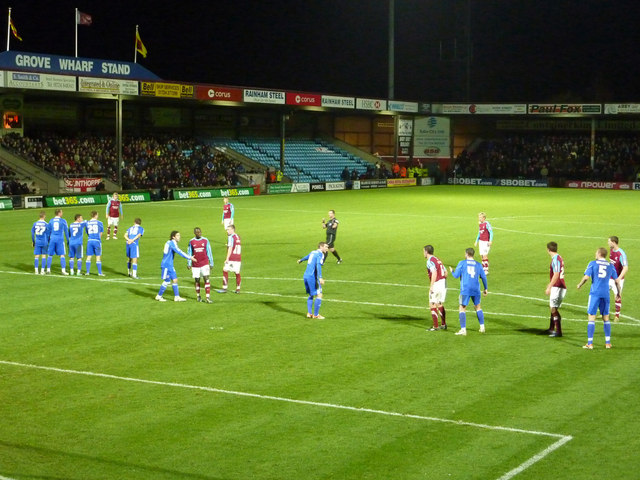
Glanford Park

The town has a former Football League club, Scunthorpe United (nicknamed "The Iron") who play at Glanford Park. For most of its existence in the professional game (since only 1950) it has been in the lower leagues of the English Football League. At the end of the 2006–07 season they won promotion to the Football League Championship as champions of League One, with 3 games to spare, when they defeated Huddersfield Town at home. They amassed a total of 91 points, and never trailed from January on, despite being outsiders earlier in the season. The last time they had played in the second division was for 44 years previously. The club were relegated on 12 April 2008, with three games to spare, away to Crystal Palace. However, they returned to the Championship after one season, winning the League One playoffs in May 2009. At the end of the 2021–22 season, Scunthorpe for the first time got relegated from the Football League. A further relegation in the 2022–23 season consigned Scunthorpe United to the National League North.

England stars Kevin Keegan and Ray Clemence both played for Scunthorpe United in the early 1970s before signing for Liverpool, where they made their names. Former England cricket captain Ian Botham played a number of games for the club, being a resident of nearby Epworth at that time and in an attempt to keep fit during the winter months. The team mascot is called the "Scunny Bunny".

Semi-professional sides within the Town or greater town boundaries include Appleby Frodingham and Bottesford Town. Local teams play in the Scunthorpe & District Football League.

=== Rugby ===
Scunthorpe Rugby Club play in the National League 2 North, the fourth tier of the English rugby union system. Their home ground is at Heslam Park, close to Brumby on Ashby Road. Scunthorpe Barbarians play rugby league also at Heslam Park.

=== Motorsports ===
Scunthorpe also has a speedway team known as the Scunthorpe Scorpions who compete in the British Premier League, the sport's second tier in Britain.

The speedway team has been running since 2005 and won a grand slam of the Conference League trophies in both 2006 and 2007 before claiming the Premier League title in 2012, alongside this Speedway world champion Tai Woffinden was born in Scunthorpe, riding for the Scunthorpe Scorpions in his youth. It runs at the Eddie Wright Raceway, which is a mile north of the town on Normanby Road (B1430).

The Eddie Wright Raceway is also host to the sport of stock car racing, the town has featured stock car racing at two other venues in its past, 2009 saw a return to the town of the oval racing sport

- Scunthorpe Scorpions – Premier League team
- Scunthorpe Saints – National League (formerly Conference League) team

=== Athletics ===
The Appleby-Frodingham Athletic Club uses the 34-acre (140,000 m^{2}) site near the Civic Centre for many types of sport. They have a clubhouse and also use Brumby Hall next-door. The site includes a 3G football pitch and an artificial Astro hockey pitch, along with several grass football pitches and an area for cricket. There is also the Scunthorpe and District Athletics Club. They train at Quibell Park Stadium, Scunthorpe's athletic track on Brumby Wood Lane named after David Quibell, the town's former Labour MP. Around the running track is a cycle track used by Polytechnic Cycle Club.

The leisure centre was on Carlton Street opposite the bus station via a footbridge. After The Pods opened this was demolished. The Scunthorpe Anchor swimming club are based at the Riddings Pool on Enderby Road next to South Leys School.

The Pods, a leisure centre near Central Park, opened in 2011 costing an estimated £21 million. Facilities include an 8 lane 25m pool and a separate shallow pool, a state of the art gym, a dance studio, a large sports hall with climbing wall, a creche and a cafe.

As part of the project, Central Park is being improved. These expensive improvements are also in their final stage. North Lincolnshire Council's website regularly show photographs and videos of how the work is progressing.

Scunthorpe has two parkruns. One in Central Park and another at Normanby Hall

=== American football ===
The Scunthorpe Alphas who were formed in 2018 play their home games at Quibell Park Stadium and for 2021 will complete in the BAFA National Leagues Division One. The town's previous American football side was the Scunthorpe Steelers who folded in 1990.

== Internet obscenity filters ==
In 1996, there was a controversy when AOL's obscenity filter (among others) refused to accept the name of the town due to its embedded word 'cunt', which became known as the Scunthorpe problem.

== Notable people ==
- Roy Axe, car designer for Chrysler and Rover was born in Scunthorpe
- Darren Bett, television weather presenter
- Nina Nannar, journalist and ITN news reporter, was born and raised in the town
- Ryan J. Brown, screenwriter
- Jack Burnell, Olympic open water swimmer
- James Cobban, English educator and headmaster, as well as a prominent lay leader in the Church of England
- Richard G. Compton, Oxford professor, was born in Scunthorpe
- Neil Cox Manager of Scunthorpe United FC
- Howard Devoto, singer with the Buzzcocks and Magazine
- Kevin Doyle, actor who has appeared in Coronation Street and Downton Abbey
- Stephen Fretwell, singer-songwriter
- Jeff Hall, English footballer who played as a right back for Birmingham City and England
- Tony Jacklin, golfer, was born in Scunthorpe
- Reece Mastin, singer and winner of 2011 X-Factor Australia, was born in Scunthorpe
- Iain Matthews, singer with Fairport Convention
- Rob McElnea, 500cc grand prix rider, team manager of the Virgin Mobile Yamaha team
- Ross McLaren, actor, was born in Scunthorpe
- Sheffield born Alfie Moore, comedian who was formerly a Police Officer based in Scunthorpe.
- Graham Oates, is an English former professional footballer. He played as a midfielder.
- John Osborne, writer. Creator of Sky 1 sitcom After Hours as well as six half-hour Radio 4 storytelling shows.
- Dame Joan Plowright, award-winning actress, born in nearby Brigg, attended Scunthorpe Grammar School
- David Plowright, television executive and producer
- Jake Quickenden, former contestant on The X Factor, I'm a Celebrity...Get Me Out of Here! and Dancing on Ice
- Ruen Brothers (Rupert and Henry Stansall), hail from Scunthorpe
- Martin Simpson, guitarist and singer-songwriter, was born in Scunthorpe
- Sam Slocombe, professional football player for Notts County F.C. and formerly of local side Scunthorpe United, was born in the town
- Liz Smith, actress
- Andy Stevenson, footballer
- Graham Taylor, former England manager grew up in the town.
- Brian Tierney, published historian and medievalist
- Alan Walker, musicologist and biographer of Franz Liszt, was born in Scunthorpe
- Stephen Westaby heart surgeon
- Albert 'Lal' White, Olympic cycling silver medallist at the 1920 Antwerp games. He was the subject of the opera Cycle Song.
- Tai Woffinden, speedway world champion

== International relations ==
- Clamart, France
- Lüneburg, Germany
- Ostrowiec Świętokrzyski, Poland

== See also ==
- Queen Bess, Scunthorpe, Grade-II listed public house

== Bibliography ==
General history

- Ambler, R. W. (ed.), Workers and Community: The People of Scunthorpe in the 1870s: A Study Based on the 1871 Census Returns (Scunthorpe: Scunthorpe Museum Society, 1980).
- Armstrong, M. Elizabeth (ed.), An Industrial Island: A History of Scunthorpe (Scunthorpe: Scunthorpe Borough Museum and Art Gallery, 1981).
- Cooke, Reg, and Kathleen Cooke, Scunthorpe, Images of England series (Stroud: Chalford Publishing, 1997).
- Creed, Rupert, and Averil Coult, Steeltown: The Real Life Drama of the Men and Women Who Built an Industry (Beverley: Hutton Press, 1990).
- Dudley, H. E., History and Antiquities of the Scunthorpe and Frodingham District (Scunthorpe: W. H. & C. H. Caldicott, 1931).
- Ellis, Stephen, and Dave R. Crowther (eds.), Humber Perspectives: A Region Through the Ages (Kingston-upon-Hull: Hull University Press, 1990).
- Holm, Stuart (ed.), The Heavens Reflect Our Labours (Scunthorpe: Scunthorpe Museum and Art Gallery, 1974).
- Knell, Simon J., The Natural History of the Frodingham Ironstone (Scunthorpe: Scunthorpe Museum and Art Gallery, 1988).
- Lewis, Peter, and Philip N. Jones, Industrial Britain: The Humberside Region (Newton Abbot: David & Charles, 1970).
- McEntee-Taylor, Carole, A History of Women's Lives in Scunthorpe (Barnsley: Pen & Sword, 2019).
- Pocock, D. C. D., "Iron and steel at Scunthorpe", East Midlands Geographer, no. 19 (vol. 3, part 3) (1963), pp. 124–138.
- Pocock, D. C. D., "Stages in the development of the Frodingham ironstone field", Transactions and Papers of the Institute of British Geographers, no. 35 (1964), pp. 105–118.
- Pocock, D. C. D., "Specialised industrial towns as service centres: a comparison of Scunthorpe and Corby", Transactions of the Institute of British Geographers, no. 40 (1966), pp. 97–109.
- Pocock, D. C. D., "Landownership and urban growth in Scunthorpe", East Midland Geographer, vol. 5 (1970), 52–61.
- Tonks, Eric S., The Ironstone Quarries of the Midlands: History, Operation and Railways, Part VIII, South Lincolnshire (Cheltenham: Runpast, 1991).
- Walshaw, G. R., and C. A. J. Behrendt, The History of Appleby-Frodingham (London: Appleby-Frodingham Steel Co., 1950).
- Wheeler, P. T., "Ironstone working between Melton Mowbray and Grantham", East Midland Geographer, vol. 4, no. 4 (1967), pp. 239–250.
- Wright, Neil R., Lincolnshire Towns and Industry, 1700–1914, History of Lincolnshire Series, no. 11 (Lincoln: History of Lincolnshire Committee of the Society for Lincolnshire History and Archaeology, 1982).
- Wright, Neil R. "The varied fortunes of heavy and manufacturing industry 1914–1987", in Dennis Mills (ed.), Twentieth Century Lincolnshire, History of Lincolnshire, no. 12 (Lincoln: History of Lincolnshire Committee of the Society for Lincolnshire History and Archaeology, 1989), pp. 74–102.
- Wright, Neil R., Lincolnshire's Industrial Heritage: A Guide (Lincoln: Society for Lincolnshire History and Archaeology, 2004).

Other

- Ginns, Arthur, Jubilee History of the Scunthorpe Mutual Co-Operative and Industrial Society (Manchester: Co-operative Printing Society Ltd, 1924).
- Hutchison, I. M., Superstores: The Impact on Shopping Patterns within the Scunthorpe Area (Scunthorpe: Scunthorpe Borough Council, n.d.).
- Staff, John, From Nuts to Iron: The Official History of Scunthorpe United F.C., 1899–2012 (Harefield: Yore Publications, 2012).
