= North Lindsey College =

Location
- Kingsway; Scunthorpe, North Lincolnshire, DN17 1AJ; England; 53.5786°N 0.6667°W

Information
- Type: Further education college
- Established: 1 October 1953
- Local authority: North Lincolnshire
- Department for Education URN: 130587 Tables
- Ofsted: Reports
- Head teacher: John Rees
- Age: 16+
- Website: http://www.northlindsey.ac.uk

North Lindsey College is a further education college in Scunthorpe, North Lincolnshire, England, situated on the A18.

The college is an operating division of the DN Colleges Group, alongside Doncaster College, University Campus Doncaster, University Campus North Lincolnshire, and Humber Energy Skills Training Academy.

== History ==
=== North Lindsey Technical College ===
Construction started on Tuesday 27 March 1951, with 23 acres. The college was established on Thursday 1 October 1953 as North Lindsey Technical College. Its first Principal was Mr F. C. Jones, B.Sc. (Eng.), who had already been appointed in 1946.

Its main building opened in 1964.

=== North Lindsey College of Technology ===
In 1971 the college became the North Lindsey College of Technology – at that time it was run by Lindsey Education Committee (based in Lincoln). Humberside Education Committee in Beverley took over the administration of the college in 1974.

At that stage it had five departments:

- Business and Management Studies
- Construction
- Engineering
- General Studies
- Science and Metallurgy
- Mathematics and Computing

A college library was built in 1978, and a refectory in 1980. An art and design department opened in 1987.

=== North Lindsey College ===
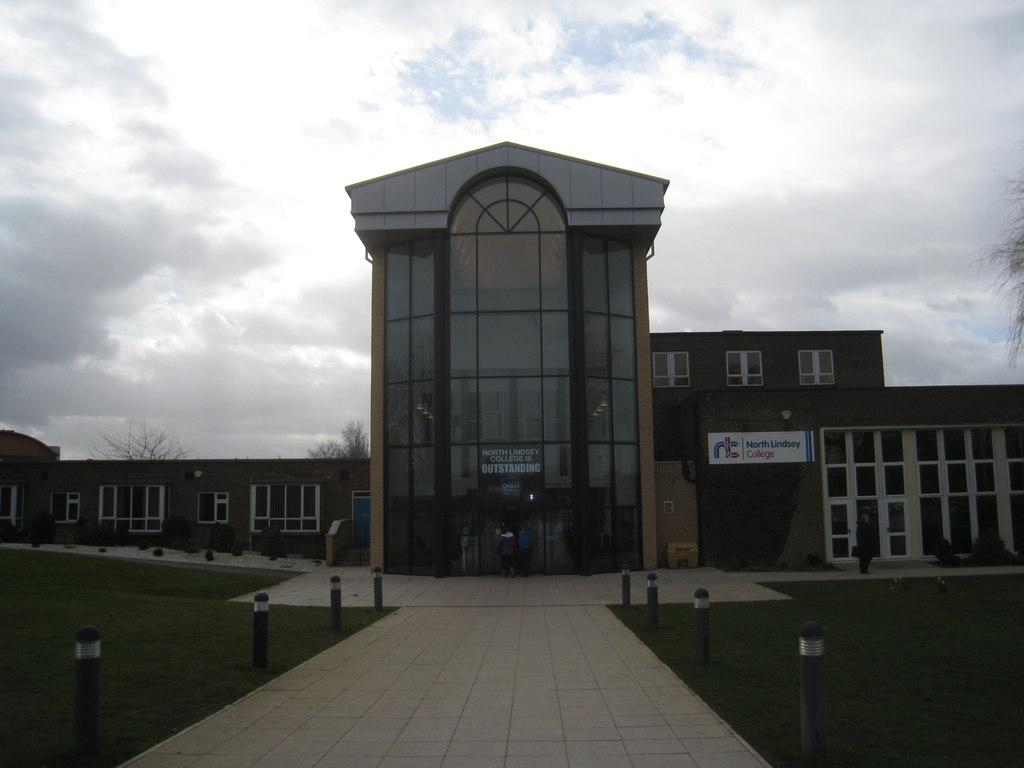
The main building in 2012, with the 2010 atrium visible. This building was demolished in 2026.

In 1989 the institution became North Lindsey College. The college logo was designed by local graphic designer and tutor in the art and design department Carole Van Hoffelen and featured a framed 'S' made from 5 parallel lines, symbolic of the local steelworks.

In May 2010, an atrium was constructed at the front of the main entrance of the main building, and was opened in September 2010.

During August 2010, the oldest building on the college campus was demolished.

=== DN Colleges Group ===
On 1 November 2017, North Lindsey College merged with Doncaster College, creating the DN Colleges Group.

In November 2018, it was announced that the University Campus North Lincolnshire would open in the nearby Scunthorpe Civic Centre, and that the existing higher education programmes of North Lindsey College would move to the new campus. The new campus opened in September 2019.

In 2024–2026, the North Lindsey College site underwent a major redevelopment, involving the construction of a new main college building on the location previously occupied by the Design Centre and Children's Centre, followed by the demolition of the existing main college building. The new main building was ceremonially opened on 16 October 2025.
