= Pod (sculpture) =

Sculpture in Portland, Oregon

- The sculpture at the corner of Southwest 10th Avenue and West Burnside Street
- Artist: Pete Beeman
- Year: 2002
- Type: Sculpture
- Medium: Stainless steel; galvanized steel; bronze; titanium; lead; plastic; rubber
- Dimensions: 9.1 m (30 ft); 4.6 m diameter (15 ft)
- Location: Portland, Oregon; 45.522868°N 122.681301°W
- Owner: City of Portland and Multnomah County Public Art Collection courtesy of the Regional Arts & Culture Council

Pod is a 2002 modern sculpture by American artist Pete Beeman, currently installed at Southwest 10th Avenue and West Burnside Street in downtown Portland, Oregon. The 30-foot (9.1 m) sculpture, intended to represent the "infrastructure, energy, and vibrancy of Portland", is supported by its static tripod base with a 15-foot (4.6 m) diameter. It is constructed from stainless steel, galvanized steel, bronze, titanium, lead and other materials. Pod was fabricated by Beeman and David Bermudez, and engineered by Beeman and Peterson Structural Engineers. It is considered interactive and kinetic, with a central, vertical pendulum that swings back and forth when pushed. The sculpture cost as much as $50,000 and was funded by the Portland Streetcar Project. Pod is part of the City of Portland and Multnomah County Public Art Collection courtesy of the Regional Arts & Culture Council.

== Description ==
Pod was designed by native Portland resident Pete Beeman as a public art project for the Portland Streetcar. According to Beeman and the Regional Arts & Culture Council, the modern sculpture is designed to represent the "infrastructure, energy, and vibrancy of Portland". Of the work's design, Beeman said:

I was thinking about how Portland is designed and planned and built, and how the planning and infrastructure of Portland is really important in what makes Portland great. I was thinking of the static tripod as the infrastructure. The moving part was the vibrancy and life. ... The most interesting part of the sculpture will be watching people try to move it.

Pod is constructed from stainless steel, galvanized steel, bronze, titanium, lead, plastic and rubber. The 30-foot (9.1 m) sculpture is supported by its static tripod base with a 14- to 15-foot diameter. Each of the three "legs", cut to size by BBC Steel, stand 14 feet (4.3 m) tall and are grounded by two cubic yards (1.5 m^{3}) of concrete. The central pendulum structure consists of 73 titanium rods; each of these connects to a "star fruit"–shaped bronze bulb at the base of the pendulum.

Pod was fabricated by Beeman and David Bermudez, and engineered by Beeman and Peterson Structural Engineers. The work is considered interactive and kinetic; the central, vertical pendulum swings back and forth when pushed. The upper and lower parts of the pendulum "swing and flex in different rhythms, affecting each other" until returning to a resting position. Pod cost $40,000–50,000 and was funded by the Portland Streetcar Project.

== History ==
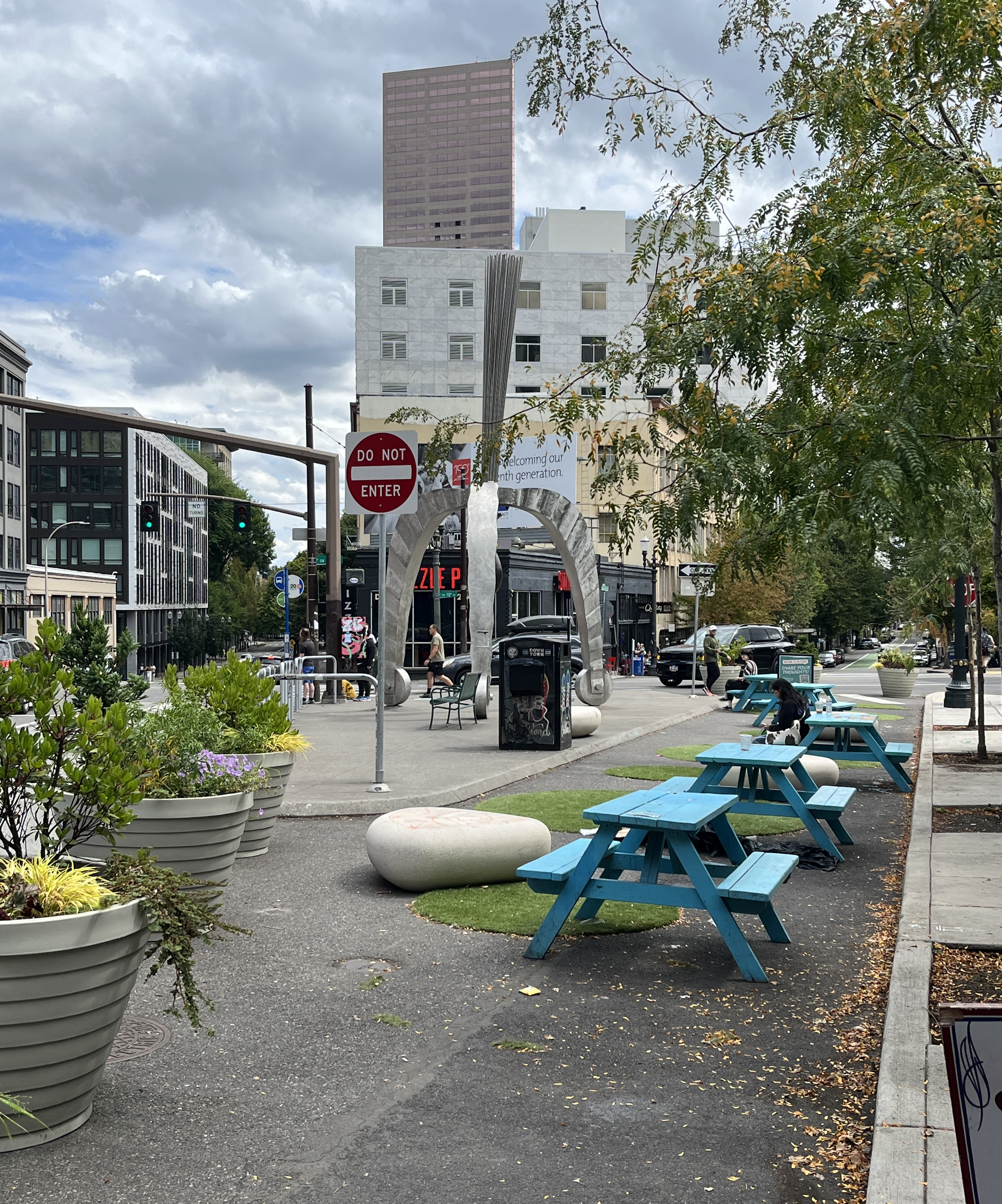
The sculpture in 2025

The sculpture was installed at a triangular traffic island at a busy street intersection (Southwest 10th Avenue and West Burnside Street) in downtown Portland in November 2002. In 2003, Pod was included in a walking tour by the Americans for the Arts Public Art Conference. It was cleaned and underwent maintenance for approximately two weeks in August 2010.

Dual Pendulum (2000), Beeman's kinetic prototype of Pod, was installed at Oregon State University for Da Vinci Days in 2007.

== Reception ==
In 2002, D. K. Row of The Oregonian called Pod a "complex, funny piece," comparing it to a "mechanical spider with an unlikely spine sticking in the air". Row said the sculpture evoked the curves of sculptor Richard Serra and design style of architect Frank Gehry. Michael Powell, owner of Powell's City of Books (located across the street from Pod), called the sculpture "wonderful". Pod has been compared to a scrotum and has even been referred to as the "Ass tickler of God", "Satan's Testicle" and "The Nutsack".

== See also ==
- 2002 in art
