= Orthotube =

Capsule-like high security interlocking door

Orthotubes at the Australian Security Intelligence Organisation Central Office in Canberra, Australia.

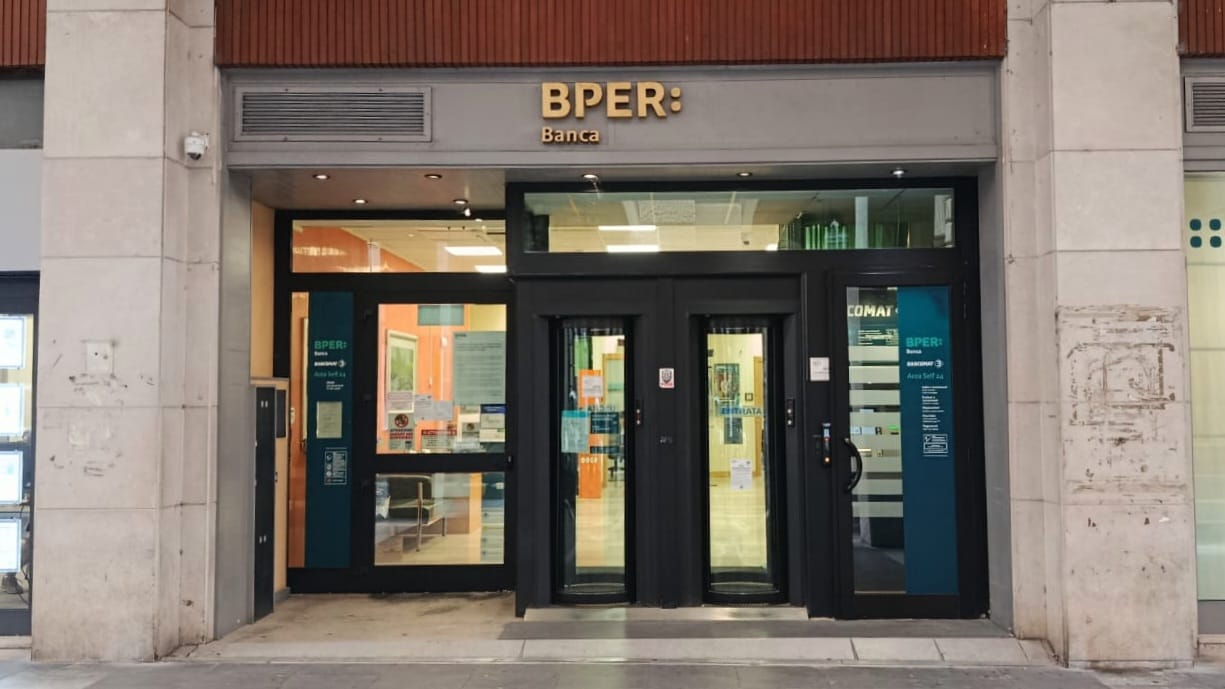
Orthotubes at a bank branch in Chieti, Italy.

An orthotube is a capsule-like high security interlocking door allowing entry to a building or office by one authorised person at a time. Orthotubes are typically used by security and intelligence agencies, such as the Australian Security Intelligence Organisation and the United Kingdom Security Service to control access to buildings housing sensitive information.

Orthotubes are manufactured by Boon Edam B.V. of the Netherlands and marketed as Circlelock.

== In popular culture ==
The devices appear in the BBC spy drama Spooks, in which they are referred to as pods.
