= Middlesbrough =

Town in North Yorkshire, England

- Town
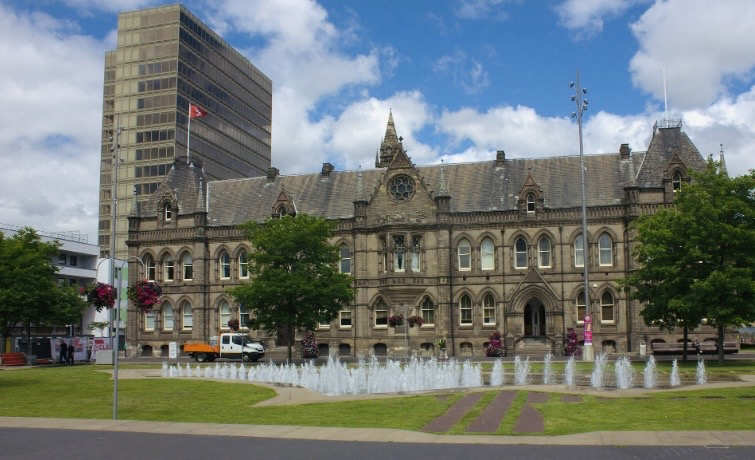
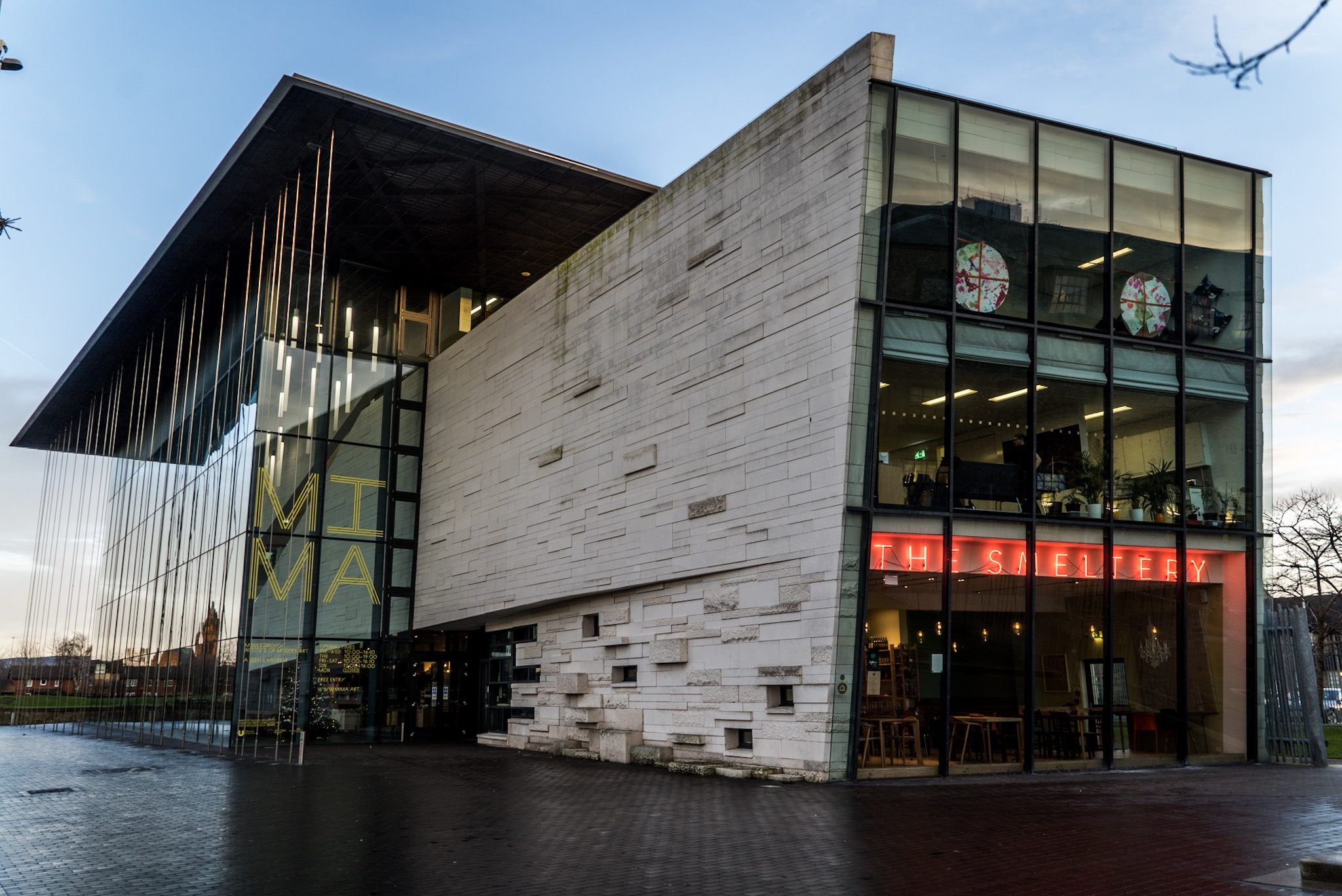
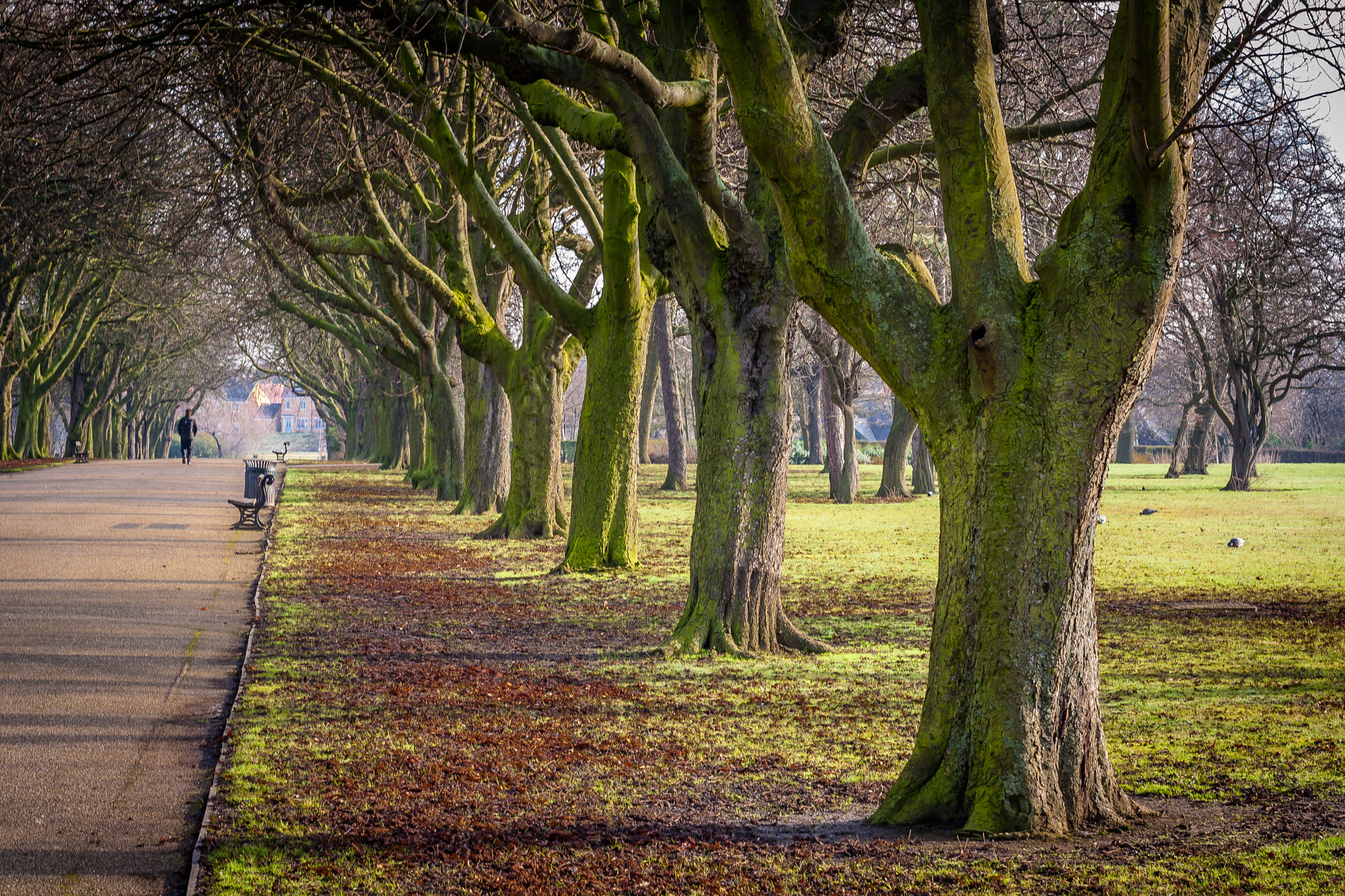
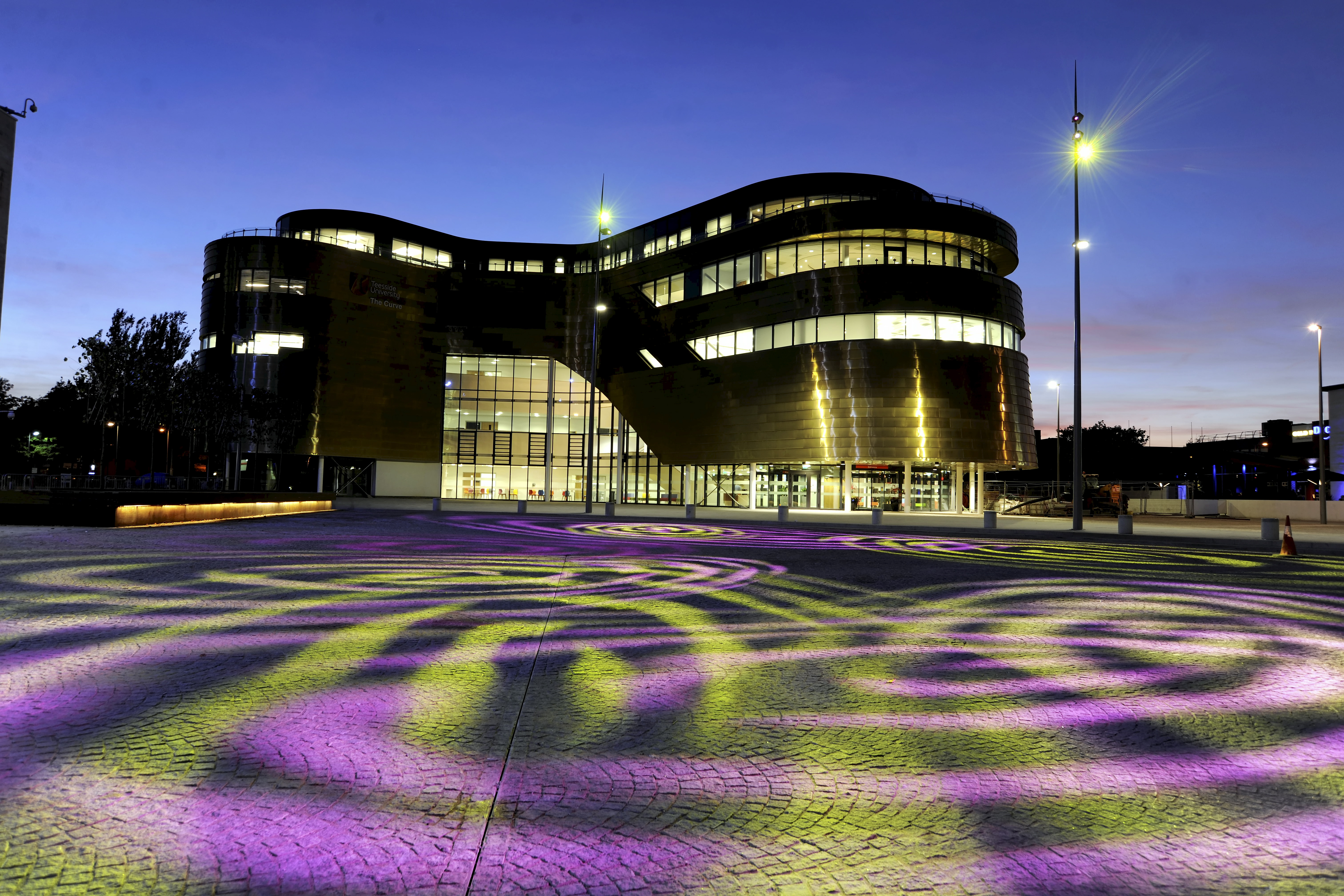
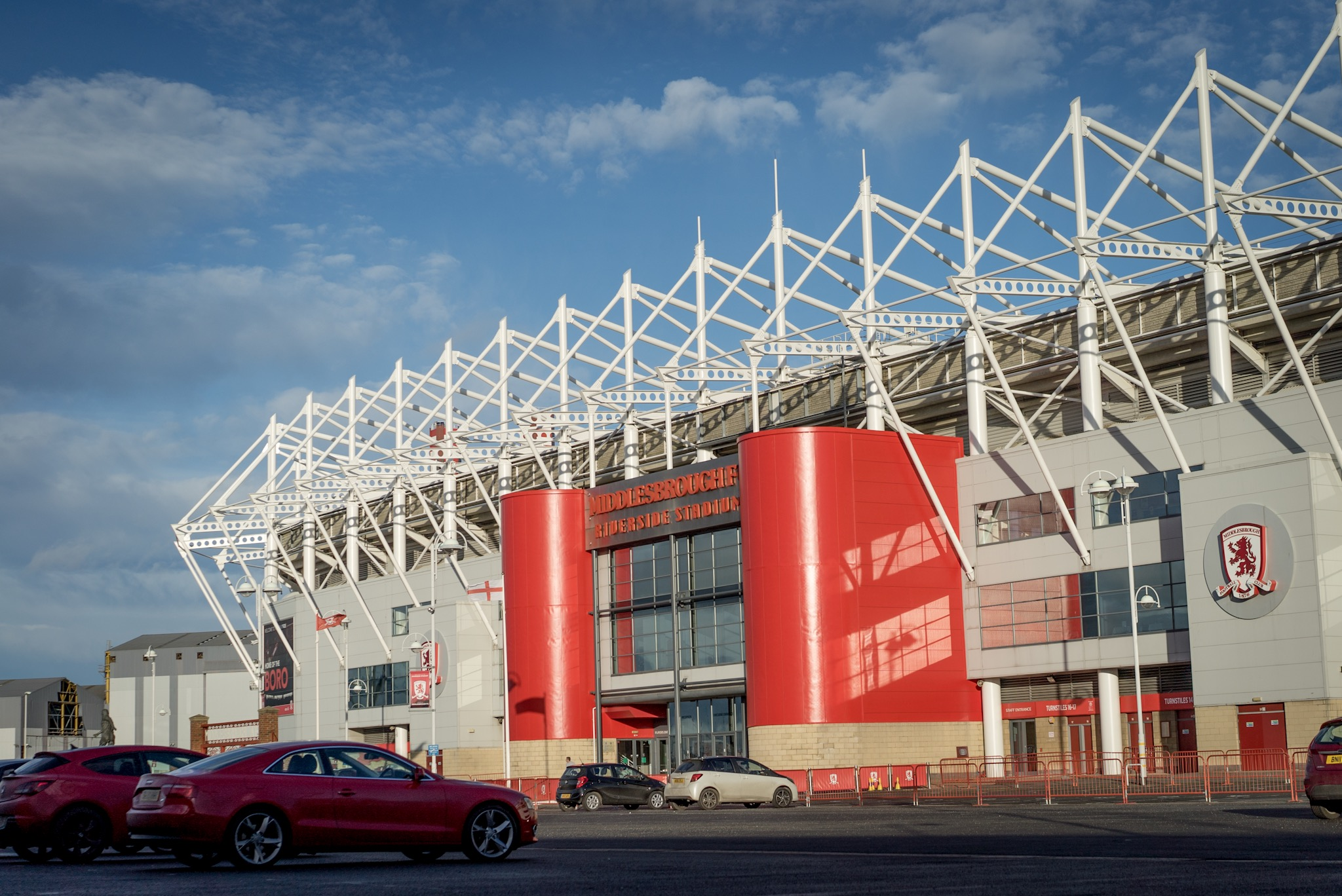
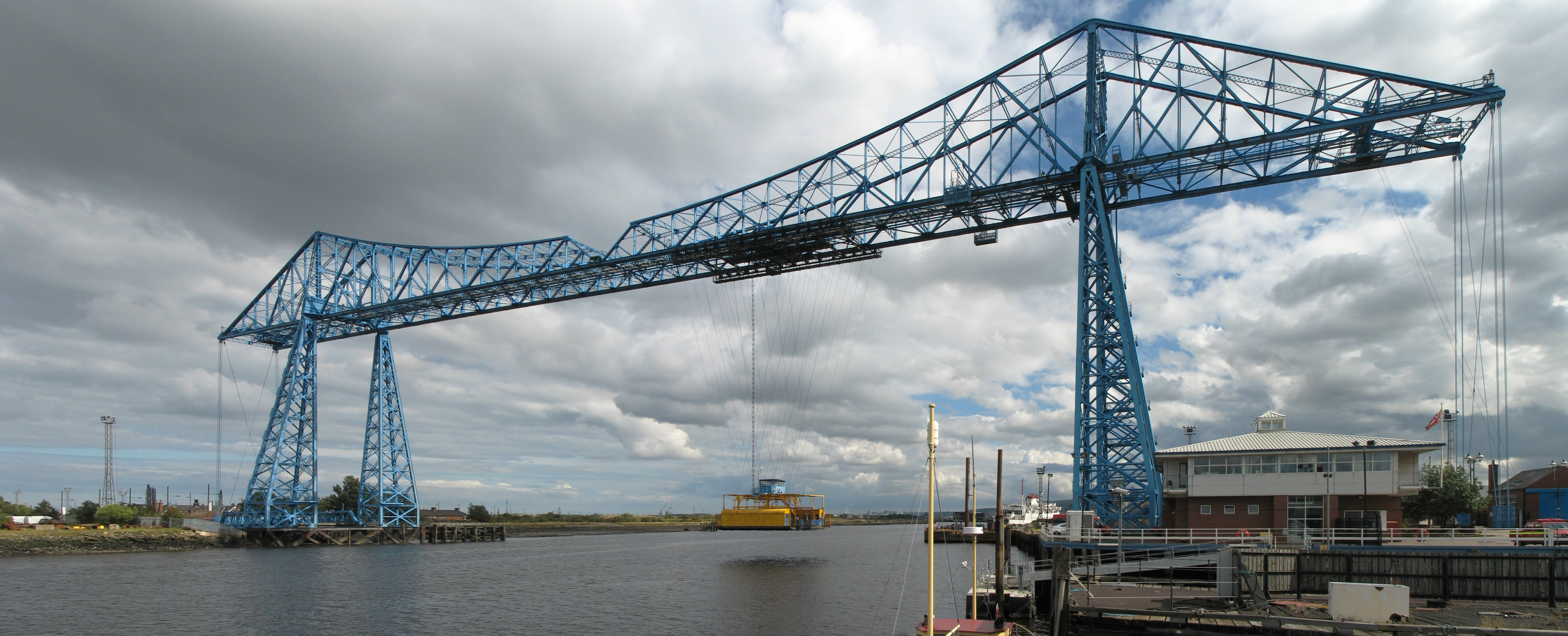
- Town Hall MIMA Albert Park Teesside University Riverside Stadium Transporter Bridge

- Coat of arms

- Location within the United Kingdom Location within North Yorkshire
- Population
  - Built-up area (2021): 148,215
  - Borough (2025): 152,795
- Demonym: Middlesbroughian, Smoggie (colloquial)
- OS grid reference: NZ495204
  - London: 217 mi (349 km) S
- Unitary authority: Middlesbrough
- Ceremonial county: North Yorkshire
- Region: North East
- Country: England
- Sovereign state: United Kingdom
- Areas of the town: List: Acklam; Ayresome; Berwick Hills; Brambles Farm; Coulby Newham; Easterside; Grove Hill; Hemlington; Linthorpe; Marton; Middlehaven; North Ormesby; Nunthorpe (parished); Pallister; Stainton (parished); Saltersgill; Thornton (parished); Thorntree; Tollesby; Whinney Banks
- Post town: MIDDLESBROUGH
- Postcode district: TS1–TS9
- Dialling code: 01642
- Police: Cleveland
- Fire: Cleveland
- Ambulance: North East
- UK Parliament: Middlesbrough and Thornaby East, Middlesbrough South and East Cleveland
- Website: https://www.middlesbrough.gov.uk/

Middlesbrough (/ˈmɪdəlzbrə/ MID-əlz-brə), colloquially known as Boro, is a port town and unitary authority of North Yorkshire, located in North East England. Situated on the southern bank of the River Tees, Middlesbrough forms part of the Borough of Middlesbrough, the Teesside built-up area and the Tees Valley. The town is governed by the Middlesbrough Council unitary authority, which is divided into twenty wards, as part of the Tees Valley Combined Authority along with Darlington, Hartlepool, Redcar and Cleveland, and Stockton-on-Tees. In 2021, it had a population of 148,215.

There was a priory at the site from 686 until 1537, but no urban settlement until Joseph Pease selected it as the site for the Stockton and Darlington Railway in 1829. After this, it rapidly grew into a major centre of iron production. By the mid-1870s, it produced one third of the United Kingdom's pig iron output and was known as Ironopolis. Steel production, ship building, and the chemical industry were also major industries. Since World War II, these industries have declined in major fashion, but Teesport and the Wilton International industrial site remain major employers.

== History ==
=== Medieval period ===
Middlesbrough started as a Benedictine priory on the south bank of the river Tees; its name was possibly derived from it being midway between the holy sites of Durham and Whitby. The earliest recorded form of Middlesbrough's name is "Mydilsburgh". Some believe the name means 'middle fortress', since it was midway between the two religious houses of Durham and Whitby; others state that it is an Old English personal name (Midele or Myhailf) combined with burgh, meaning town.

In 686, a monastic cell was consecrated by St Cuthbert at the request of St Hilda, Abbess of Whitby. The cell evolved into Middlesbrough Priory. The manor of Middlesburgh belonged to Whitby Abbey and Gisborough Priory. Robert Bruce, Lord of Cleveland and Annandale, granted and confirmed, in 1119, the church of St. Hilda of Middleburg to Whitby. Up until its closure on the Dissolution of the Monasteries by Henry VIII in 1537, the church was maintained by 12 Benedictine monks, many of whom became vicars, or rectors, of various places in Cleveland.

After settlement by the Angles, the area became home to Viking settlers. Names of Viking origin (with the suffix by, meaning village) are abundant; for example, Ormesby, Stainsby and Tollesby. These were once separate villages named after Vikings called Orm, Steinn and Toll; they are now areas of Middlesbrough that were recorded in Domesday Book, of 1086.

=== Port development ===
In 1801, Middlesbrough was a small farming township with a population of just 25. From 1829 onwards, it experienced rapid growth. In 1828, the influential Quaker banker, coal-mine owner and Stockton and Darlington Railway shareholder Joseph Pease sailed up the River Tees to find a suitable new site downriver of Stockton on which to place new coal staithes. As a result, in 1829, he and a group of Quaker businessmen bought the Middlesbrough farmstead and associated estate, some 527 acres (213 ha) of land and established the Middlesbrough Estate Company.

Through the company, the investors set about a new coal port development (designed by John Harris) on the southern banks of the Tees. The first coal shipping staithes at the port (known as "Port Darlington") were constructed with a settlement to the east established on the site of Middlesbrough farm as labour for the port, taking on the farm's name as it developed into a village.

The port was linked to the S&DR on 27 December 1830 via a branch that extended to an area just north of the current Middlesbrough railway station.

The success of the port meant it soon became overwhelmed by the volume of imports and exports; in 1839, work started on a dock to the east of Middlesbrough. The first water for the dock was let in on 19 March 1842, while the formal opening took place on 12 May 1842.

=== Victorian era ===
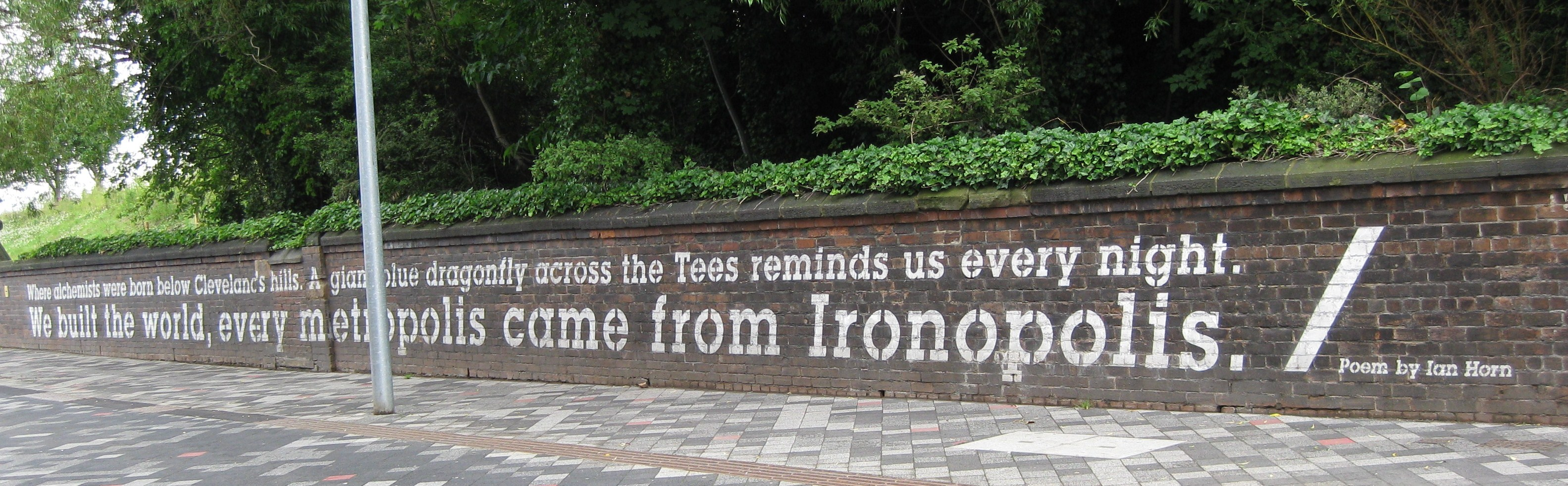
A poem by Ian Horn: "Where alchemists were born below Cleveland's Hills. A giant blue dragonfly across the Tees reminds us every night. We built the world, every metropolis came from the Ironopolis."

Iron dominated the Tees area since 1841, when Henry Bolckow in partnership with John Vaughan, founded the Vulcan iron foundry and rolling mill. Vaughan introduced the new 'Bell Hopper' system of closed blast furnaces developed at the Ebbw Vale works. The new system and nearby abundant supply of Ironstone in the Eston Hills in 1850, made the works a success with the area becoming known as the "Iron-smelting centre of the world" and Bolckow, Vaughan & Co., Ltd the largest company in existence at the time.

Middlesbrough's population grew quickly from 40 people in 1829 to 7,600 by 1851. Pig iron production rose tenfold between 1851 and 1856 and, by the mid-1870s, Middlesbrough was producing one third of the nation's pig iron output. During this time, the town earned the nickname Ironopolis.

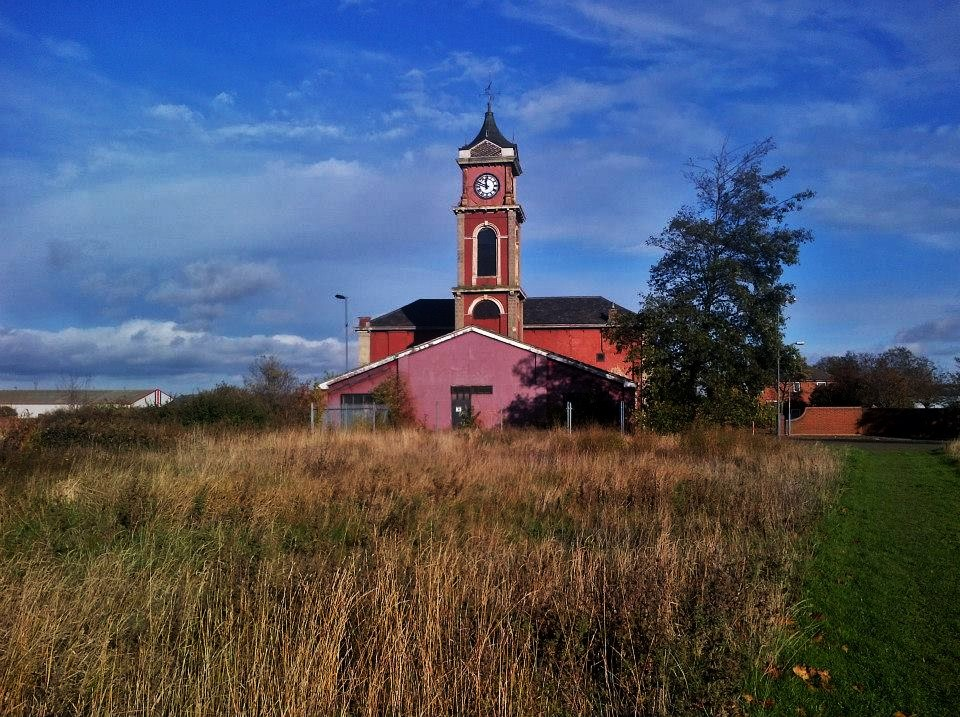
The Old Town Hall in 2013

On 21 January 1853, Middlesbrough received its Royal Charter of Incorporation, giving the town the right to have a mayor, aldermen and councillors. Henry Bolckow became mayor, in 1853.

In the latter half of the 19th century, Old Middlesbrough was starting to decline and was overshadowed by developments built around the new town hall, south of the original town hall.

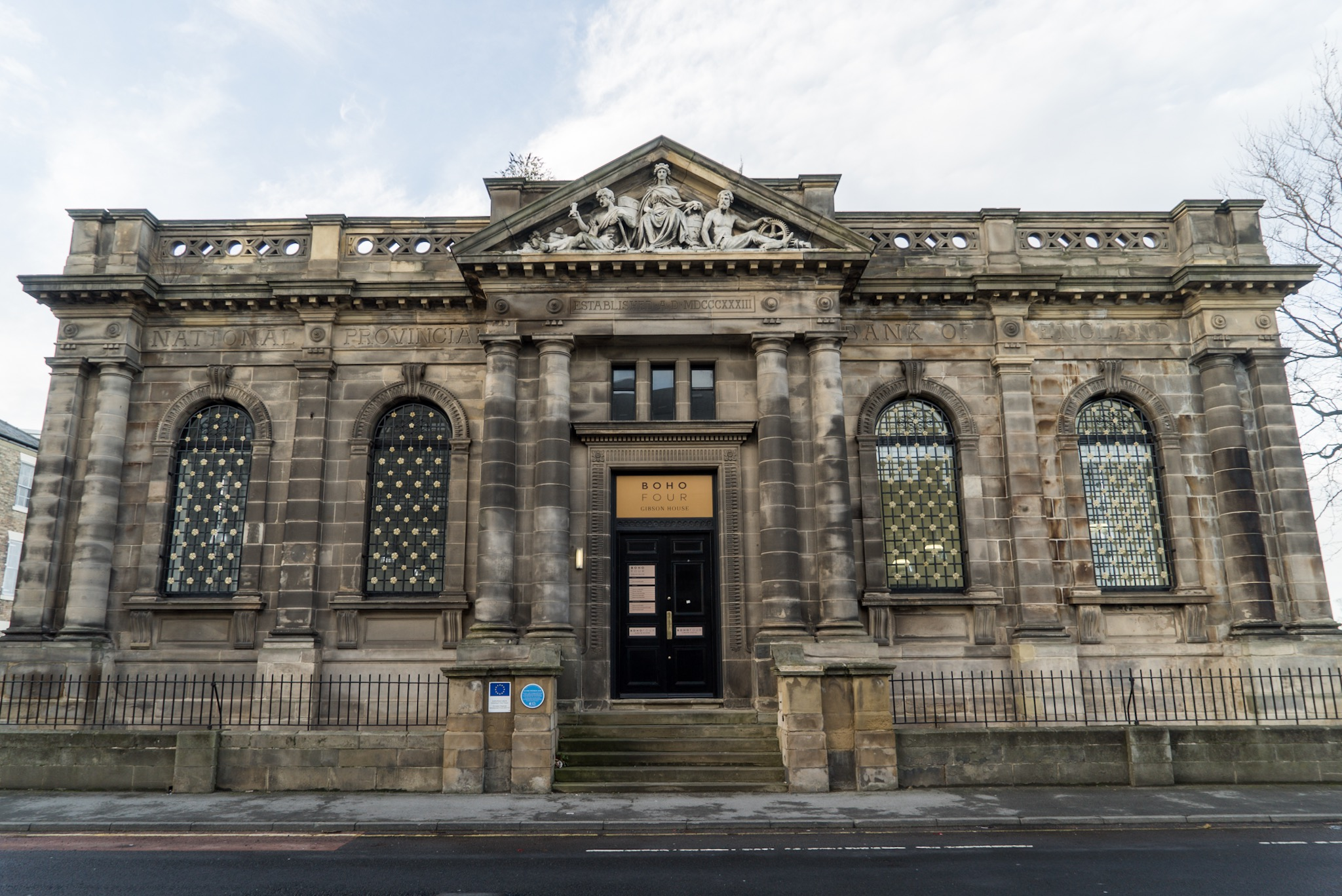
Gibson House (Boho Four)

On 15 August 1867, a Reform Bill was passed, making Middlesbrough a new parliamentary borough; Bolckow was elected member for Middlesbrough the following year.

The town's rapid expansion continued throughout the second half of the 19th century, fuelled by the iron and steel industry, and the population reached 90,000 by the dawn of the 20th century.

=== Second World War ===
Middlesbrough was the first major British town and industrial target to be bombed during the Second World War, although the official date of the Blitz is a few months later. The steel-making capacity and railways for carrying steel products were obvious targets. The Luftwaffe first bombed the town on 25 May 1940, when a lone bomber dropped 13 bombs between South Bank Road and the South Steel plant. More bombing occurred throughout the course of the war, with the railway station put out of action for two weeks in 1942.

By the end of the war, more than 200 buildings had been damaged or destroyed in the Middlesbrough area. Areas of early- and mid-Victorian housing were demolished and much of central Middlesbrough was redeveloped. Heavy industry was relocated to areas of land better suited to the needs of modern technology. Middlesbrough itself began to take on a completely different look.

=== Post-war development ===
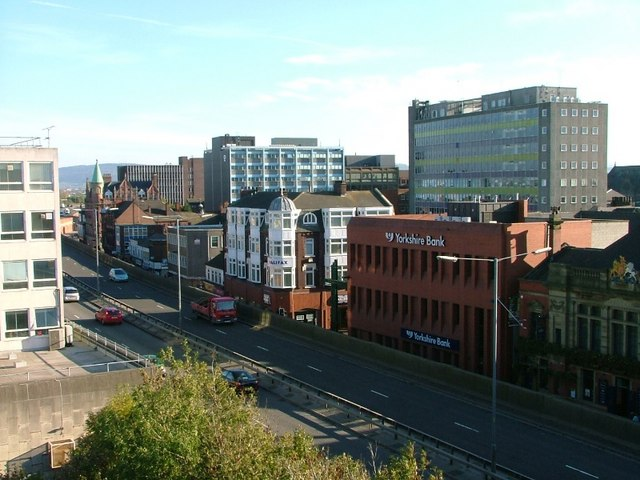
The A66 from a multi-storey car park; the road is raised, with Wilson Street running alongside it (2006)

The transition from post-war industrial to modern non-industrial Middlesbrough changed the town; many buildings were replaced and roads built. The A66 road was built through the town in the 1980s and the Royal Exchange was demolished to make way for it.

Middlesbrough F.C.'s modern Riverside Stadium opened on 26 August 1995, next to Middlesbrough Dock. The club moved from Ayresome Park, which had been its home for 92 years.

The original St Hilda's area of Middlesbrough, after decades of decline and clearance, was given the new name of Middlehaven, in 1986, on investment proposals to build on the land. Middlehaven has since had new buildings built there including Middlesbrough College and the Riverside Stadium amongst others. Also situated at Middlehaven is the Boho zone, offering office space to the area's business, to attract new companies and also Bohouse housing. Some of the street names from the original grid-iron street plan of the town still exist in the area today.

The expansion of Middlesbrough southwards, eastwards and westwards continued throughout the 20th century, absorbing villages such as Linthorpe, Acklam, Ormesby, Marton and Nunthorpe; it continues to the present day.

== Governance ==
=== National representation ===
Middlesbrough is represented in the UK Parliament by two MPs from the following constituencies:

- Middlesbrough and Thornaby East by Andy McDonald for Labour. He was elected in a by-election held on 29 November 2012, following the death of Sir Stuart Bell, who had been the MP since 1983
- Middlesbrough South and East Cleveland by Luke Myer (Labour), who replaced Simon Clarke of the Conservative party in 2024.

General Election 2024: Middlesbrough and Thornaby East
Party	Candidate	Votes	%	±%
Labour	Andy McDonald	21,138	49.2	−1.8
Reform	Patrick Seargeant	7,046	20.5	+14.3
Conservative	Kiran Fothergill	6,174	17.9	−6.4
Workers Party	Mehmoona Ameen	2,007	5.8	N/A
Green	Matthew Harris	1,522	4.4	+2.9
Liberal Democrats	Mo Waqas	1,037	3.0	+0.4
Independent	Mark Baxtrem	383	1.1	N/A
Majority		9,192	26.7	
Turnout		34,407	45.8	
Labour hold		Swing		

General Election 2024: Middlesbrough South and East Cleveland
Party	Candidate	Votes	%	±%
Labour	Luke Myer	16,468	43.3	+8.3
Conservative	Simon Clarke	16,254	42.7	−15.2
Liberal Democrats	Jemma Joy	2,032	5.3	+1.3
SDP	Rod Liddle	1,835	4.8	N/A
Green	Rowan McLaughlin	1,446	3.8	+1.6
Majority		214	0.6	
Turnout		38,035	54.1	
Labour gain from Conservative		Swing	+11.7	

=== Local government ===
The local authority is Middlesbrough Council, a unitary authority. Middlesbrough also forms part of the Tees Valley Combined Authority.

The council has been under Labour majority control since the 2023 election.

Political control of the council since it was re-established in 1974 has been as follows:

Non-metropolitan district

Party in control	Years
Labour	1974–1996

Unitary authority

Party in control	Years
Labour	1996–2019
No overall control	2019–2023
Labour	2023–present

Since 2002, political leadership on the council has been provided by the directly elected Mayor of Middlesbrough. Prior to 2002, the council was led by a leader of the council and the mayor had a more ceremonial role. The leaders from 1981 to 2002 were:

Councillor	Party	From	To
Walter Ferrier	Labour	1981	1983
Michael Carr	Labour	1983	1995
Ken Walker	Labour	1995	5 May 2002

The directly elected mayors since 2002 have been:

Mayor	Party	From	To
Ray Mallon	Independent	6 May 2002	10 May 2015
Dave Budd	Labour	11 May 2015	5 May 2019
Andy Preston	Independent	6 May 2019	7 May 2023
Chris Cooke	Labour	8 May 2023	

=== Administrative history ===
Middlesbrough was historically a township in the civil parish of West Acklam, in the Langbaurgh Wapentake of Yorkshire. Despite having no church building, a perpetual curacy of Middlesbrough was created in 1744, also covering the neighbouring township of Linthorpe; the curacy of Middlesbrough gradually came to be treated as a civil parish.

After construction of the modern town began in 1830, there was a need for more urban forms of local government. In 1841, a body of improvement commissioners was set up covering the township of Middlesbrough and part of the township of Linthorpe. The commissioners were superseded in 1853, when the same area was made a municipal borough. The borough boundaries were extended in 1858, 1866 and 1887. When elected county councils were created in 1889 under the Local Government Act 1888, Middlesbrough became a county borough. It was then independent from the new North Riding County Council, whilst remaining part of the North Riding of Yorkshire for ceremonial purposes.

By this time, the borough covered the civil parish of Middlesbrough and parts of the parishes of Linthorpe (where the old township had been made a separate parish in 1866), Marton and West Acklam. The Local Government Act 1894 said that parishes could no longer straddle borough boundaries and so the parish of Middlesbrough was enlarged to cover the whole borough.

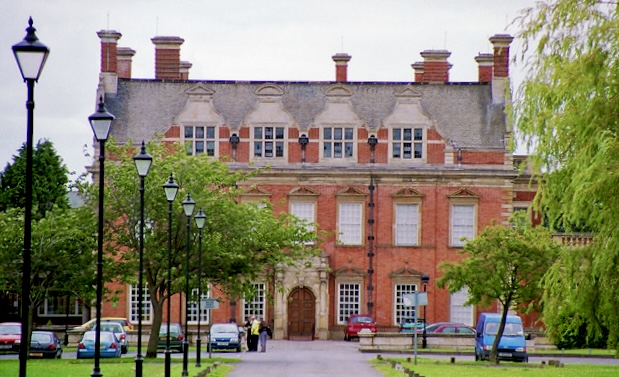
Acklam Hall, built 1680s: a manor house in the parish of West Acklam, which historically included Middlesbrough. The parish was absorbed into Middlesbrough in 1932

The borough was further enlarged in 1913, taking in the rest of Linthorpe and the North Ormesby area from the parish of Ormesby. In 1932, it gained West Acklam and smaller parts from other parishes when the Middlesbrough Rural District was abolished.

In the latter half of the 20th century, Middlesbrough was affected by three reforms in:

- 1968, Middlesbrough became part of the Teesside County Borough
- 1974, it became the county town of the Cleveland non-metropolitan county until its abolition
- 1996, the Borough of Middlesbrough became a unitary authority of North Yorkshire.

In 2011, a local enterprise partnership was formed from the former Cleveland boroughs and the Borough of Darlington called Tees Valley. In 2016, the area appointed a combined authority mayor.

== Geography ==
=== Areas ===
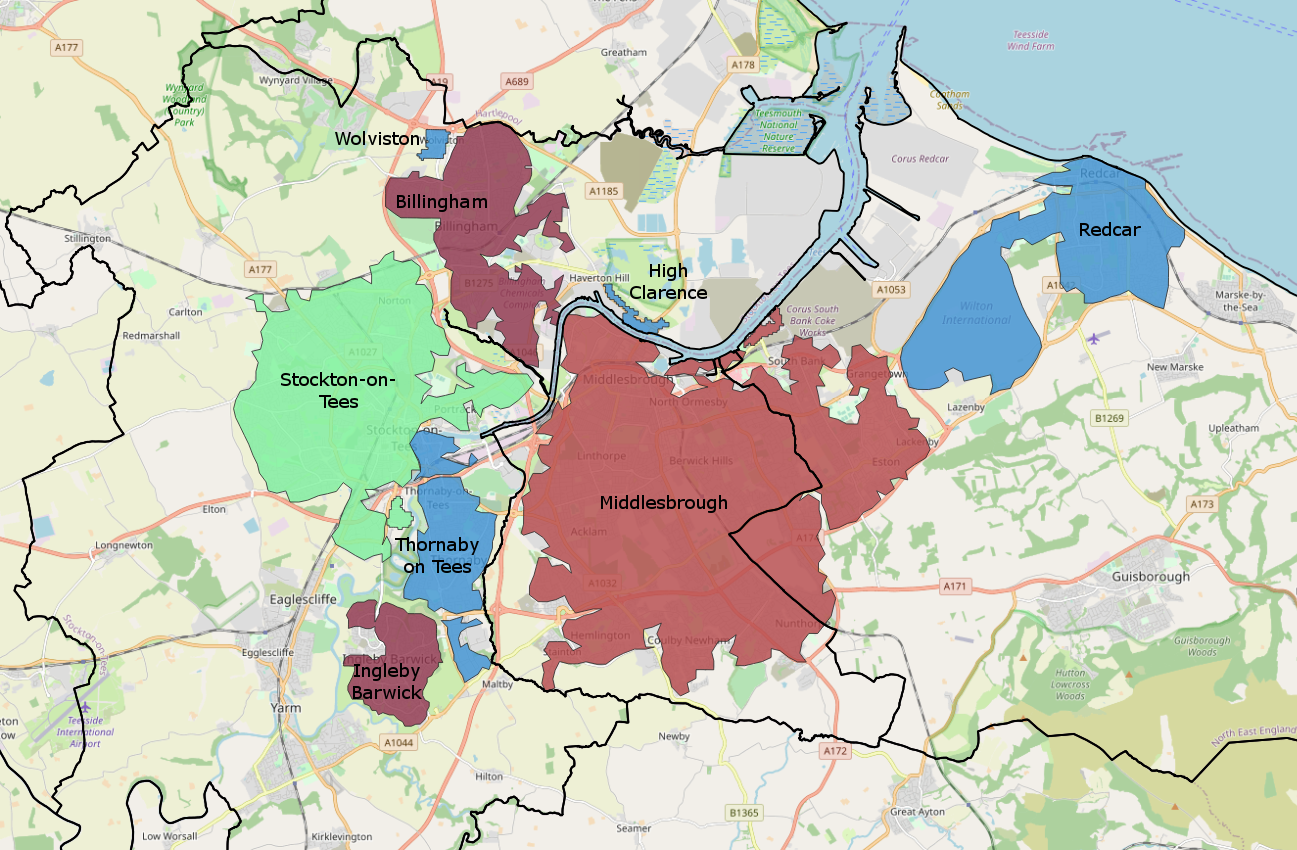
The 2011 Teesside Built-up Area with subdivisions and local authority boundaries; Middlesbrough is light red

The following 20 wards comprise the Middlesbrough built-up area:

- Acklam
- Ayresome (also includes Whinney Banks)
- Berwick Hills and Pallister
- Brambles and Thorntree
- Central
- Coulby Newham
- Hemlington
- Kader
- Ladgate (Easterside, Saltersgill and Tollesby)
- Linthorpe
- Longlands and Beechwood
- Marton East
- Marton West
- Newport
- North Ormesby
- Nunthorpe
- Park (includes Albert Park)
- Park End and Beckfield (includes Netherfields)
- Stainton and Thornton
- Trimdon.

=== Climate ===
Middlesbrough has an oceanic climate typical for the United Kingdom. Being sheltered from prevailing south-westerly winds by the Lake District and Pennines to the west, and the Cleveland Hills to the south, it is in one of the relatively dry parts of the country, receiving on average 596 millimetres (23.5 inches) of rain per year. Temperatures range from mild summer highs in July and August typically around 21 °C (70 °F), to winter lows in December and January falling to around 1 °C (34 °F).

Seasonal variations are small and both the mild summers and cool winters are far removed from the average climates of the latitude (54.5°N). This is mainly due to the British Isles being a relatively small land mass surrounded by water, the mild south-westerly Gulf Stream air that dominates the British Isles, and the propensity for cloud cover to limit temperature extremes. In nearby Scandinavia, more than ten degrees further north, there are coastal Bothnian climates with warmer summers than Middlesbrough; winters in Middlesbrough can be less cold than those at lower latitudes in mainland Europe.

Climate data for Middlesbrough, England (1991–2010, Stockton-on-Tees climate station)
Month	Jan	Feb	Mar	Apr	May	Jun	Jul	Aug	Sep	Oct	Nov	Dec	Year
Mean daily maximum °C (°F)	7.0 (44.6)	7.9 (46.2)	10.0 (50.0)	12.8 (55.0)	15.5 (59.9)	18.2 (64.8)	20.6 (69.1)	20.4 (68.7)	17.7 (63.9)	13.9 (57.0)	9.9 (49.8)	7.3 (45.1)	13.5 (56.3)
Daily mean °C (°F)	4.1 (39.4)	4.6 (40.3)	6.1 (43.0)	8.4 (47.1)	10.8 (51.4)	13.6 (56.5)	15.8 (60.4)	15.7 (60.3)	13.3 (55.9)	10.2 (50.4)	6.7 (44.1)	4.2 (39.6)	9.5 (49.0)
Mean daily minimum °C (°F)	1.1 (34.0)	1.2 (34.2)	2.1 (35.8)	3.9 (39.0)	6.1 (43.0)	8.9 (48.0)	10.9 (51.6)	10.9 (51.6)	8.8 (47.8)	6.5 (43.7)	3.5 (38.3)	1.0 (33.8)	5.4 (41.7)
Average precipitation mm (inches)	40.2 (1.58)	36.1 (1.42)	34.0 (1.34)	39.2 (1.54)	42.0 (1.65)	55.7 (2.19)	59.1 (2.33)	63.3 (2.49)	52.3 (2.06)	59.3 (2.33)	62.8 (2.47)	52.2 (2.06)	596.2 (23.46)
Mean monthly sunshine hours	56.1	76.2	109.6	138.9	180.7	171.2	174.3	161.4	125.9	91.1	59.5	50.4	1,395.3
Source: UK Met Office

== Industry ==
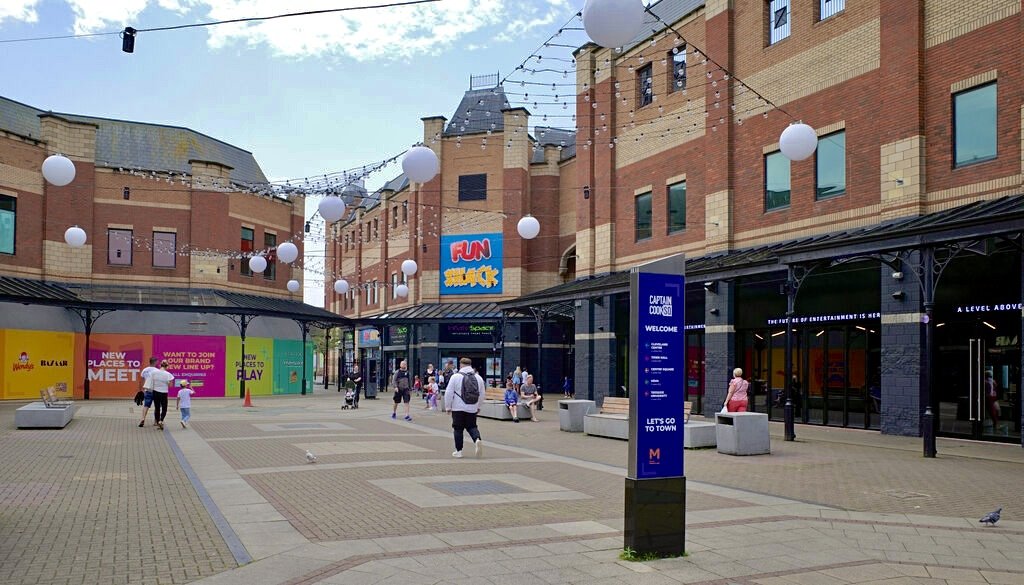
Captain Cook Square

Industry in the town was once dominated by steelmaking, shipbuilding and chemical industries. Since the late 20th century and into the 21st century, the demise of much of the heavy industry in the area, newer technologies, such as the digital sector, have emerged.

=== Engineering ===
Middlesbrough remains a stronghold for engineering-based manufacturing and engineering contract service businesses. To help support this, the TeesAMP (Advanced Manufacturing Park) is designed to accommodate businesses associated with advanced manufacturing and emerging technologies.

=== Port ===
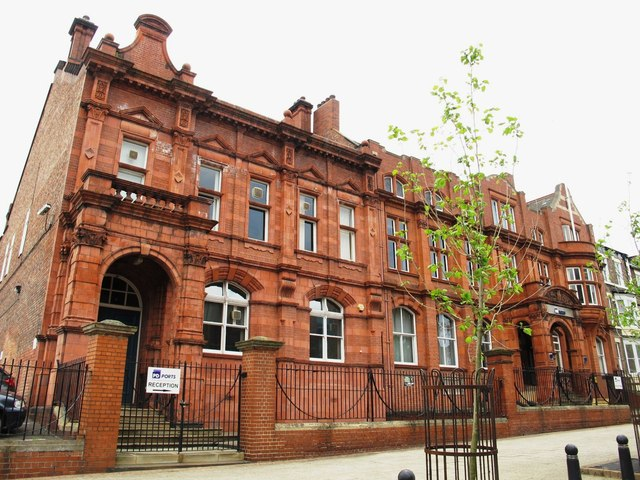
PD Ports' offices on Queen's Square

Teesport, owned by PD Ports, is a major contributor to the economy of Middlesbrough and the port owners have their offices in the town. The port is 1 mile (1.6 km) from the North Sea and 4 miles (6.4 km) east of Middlesbrough, on the Tees. In 2019, it handled over 4,350 vessels each year and around 27 million tonnes of cargo, with the estate covering approximately 779 acres. Steel, petrochemical, agribulks, manufacturing, engineering and high street commerce operations are all supported through Teesport, in addition to the renewable energy sector, in both production and assembly facilities.

=== Industrial history ===
In 1875, Bolckow, Vaughan & Co opened the Cleveland Steelworks in Middlesbrough, beginning the transition from iron production to steel and, by the turn of the century, the area had become one of the major steel centres in the country and possibly the world. In 1900, Bolckow, Vaughan & Co had become the largest producer of steel in Great Britain. In 1914, Dorman Long, another major steel producer from Middlesbrough, became the largest company in Britain, employing a workforce of over 20,000 and, by 1929, it was the dominant steel producer on Teesside after taking over Bolckow, Vaughan & Co and acquiring its assets. It was possibly the largest steel producer in Britain at the time.

The steel components of the Sydney Harbour Bridge (1932) were engineered and fabricated by Dorman Long of Middlesbrough. The company was also responsible for the New Tyne Bridge in Newcastle-upon-Tyne.

Several large shipyards also lined the Tees, including the Sir Raylton Dixon & Company, which produced hundreds of steam freighters including the infamous SS Mont-Blanc, the steamship which caused the 1917 Halifax Explosion in Canada.

The area is still home to the nearby large Wilton International industrial site which, until 1995, was largely owned by Imperial Chemical Industries (ICI). The fragmentation of that company led to smaller manufacturing units being owned by multinational organisations. The last part of ICI itself completely left the area in 2006 and the remaining companies are now members of the North East of England Process Industry Cluster (NEPIC).

=== Video games ===
Several video game companies have been based in Middlesbrough in the 21st century, including Double Eleven, SockMonkey Studios and Atomic Planet.

== Public services ==
=== Healthcare ===
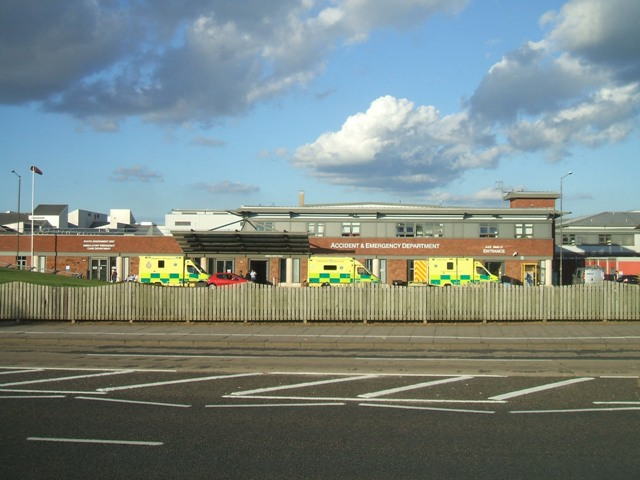
James Cook University Hospital

The South Tees Hospitals NHS Foundation Trust has the James Cook University Hospital in the town. It adds to the economy through innovative projects, such as South Tees bio-incubator which acts as a launch-pad for research, innovation and collaboration between health, technology and science. It is a facility used by GlycoSeLect (UK) Ltd. as a client of the trust in strategic partnership with The Northern Health Science Alliance which has contributed £10.8 billion to the UK economy.

Roseberry Park Hospital, operated by Tees, Esk and Wear Valleys NHS Foundation Trust (TEWV), is north of James Cook Hospital. The hospital is psychiatric orientated and replaced St Luke's Hospital. Acklam Road Hospital is operated by Cumbria, Northumberland, Tyne and Wear NHS Foundation Trust, which took over from TEWV. During the transition, it was renamed from West Lane to its current name.

There is also the Middlesbrough One Life Medical Centre and North Ormesby Health Village in the town. Ramsey Health operate the private Tees Valley Hospital in Acklam.

=== Police ===
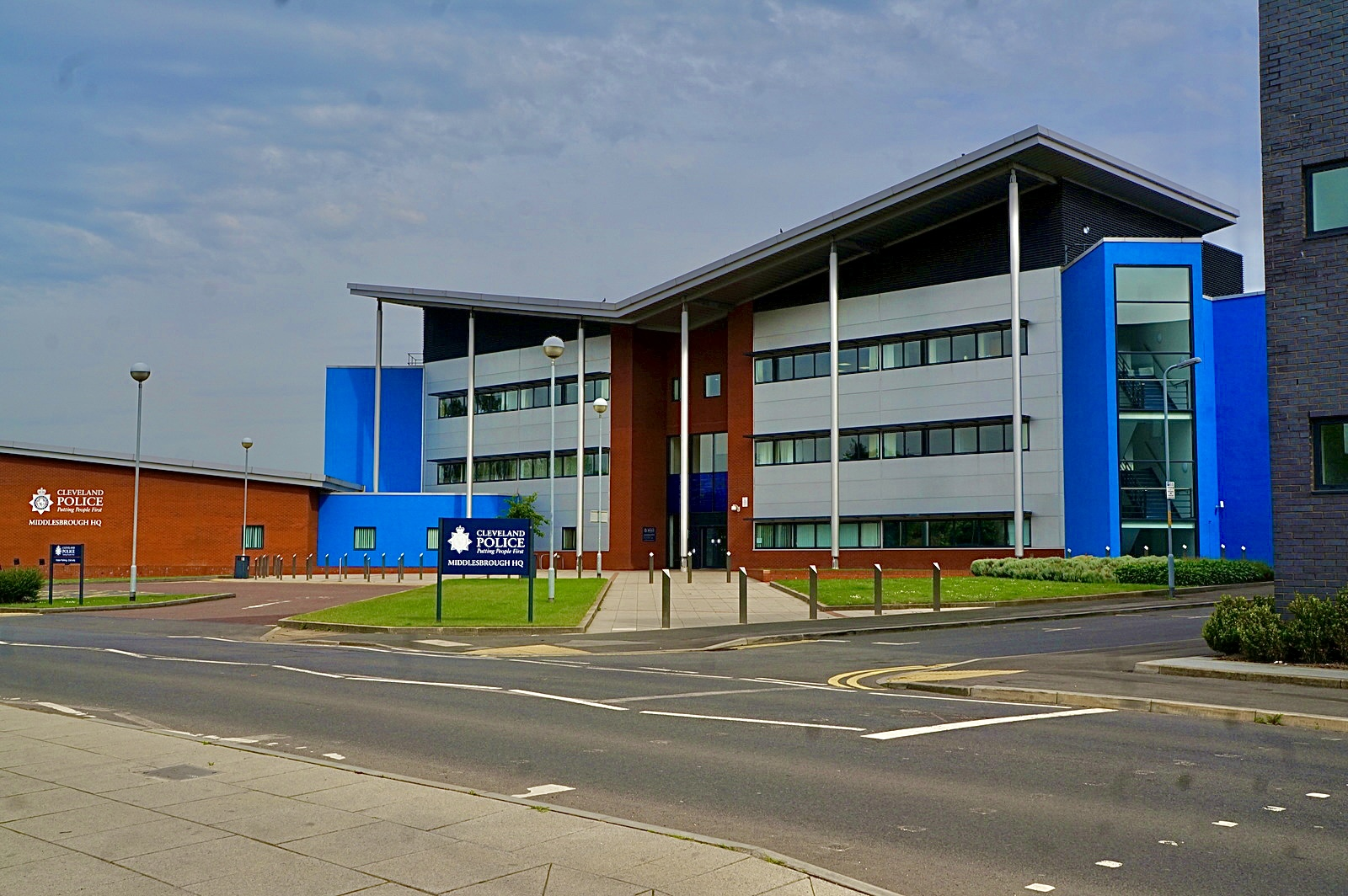
Cleveland Police Middlesbrough Headquarters

Cleveland Police serves the town and the surrounding area from their Middlesbrough headquarters on Bridge Street West, Coulby Newham police station and a number of community safety hubs.

The British Transport Police maintains a presence at Middlesbrough railway station.

== Amenities ==
=== Parks ===
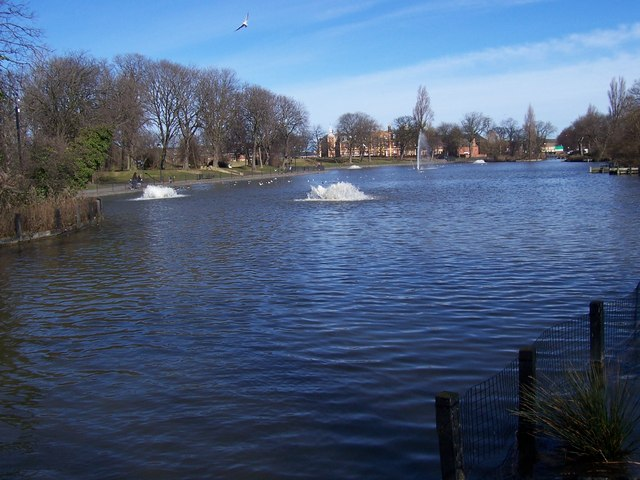
Albert Park

Albert Park was donated to the town by Henry Bolckow in 1866. It was formally opened by Prince Arthur on 11 August 1868 and consists of a 30-hectare (74-acre) site. The park underwent a considerable period of restoration from 2001 to 2004, during which a number of the park's landmarks saw either restoration or revival.

Stewart Park was donated to the people of Middlesbrough in 1928 by Councillor Thomas Dormand Stewart and encompasses Victorian stable buildings, lakes and animal pens. It is also home to the Captain Cook Birthplace Museum. During 2011 and 2012, the park underwent major refurbishment. It hosted the BBC Radio 1's Big Weekend in the summer of 2019. There is a farmers' market held in the park on the final Sunday of each month.

Newham Grange Leisure farm in the suburb of Coulby Newham has operated continuously in this spot since the 17th century, becoming a farm park and conservation centre farm with the first residential development of the suburb in the 1970s.

=== Libraries ===
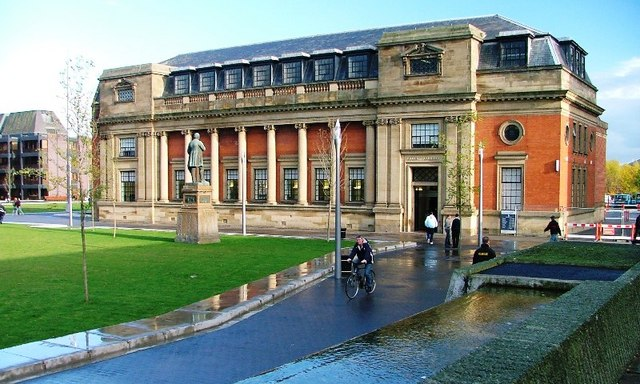
Middlesbrough Central Library

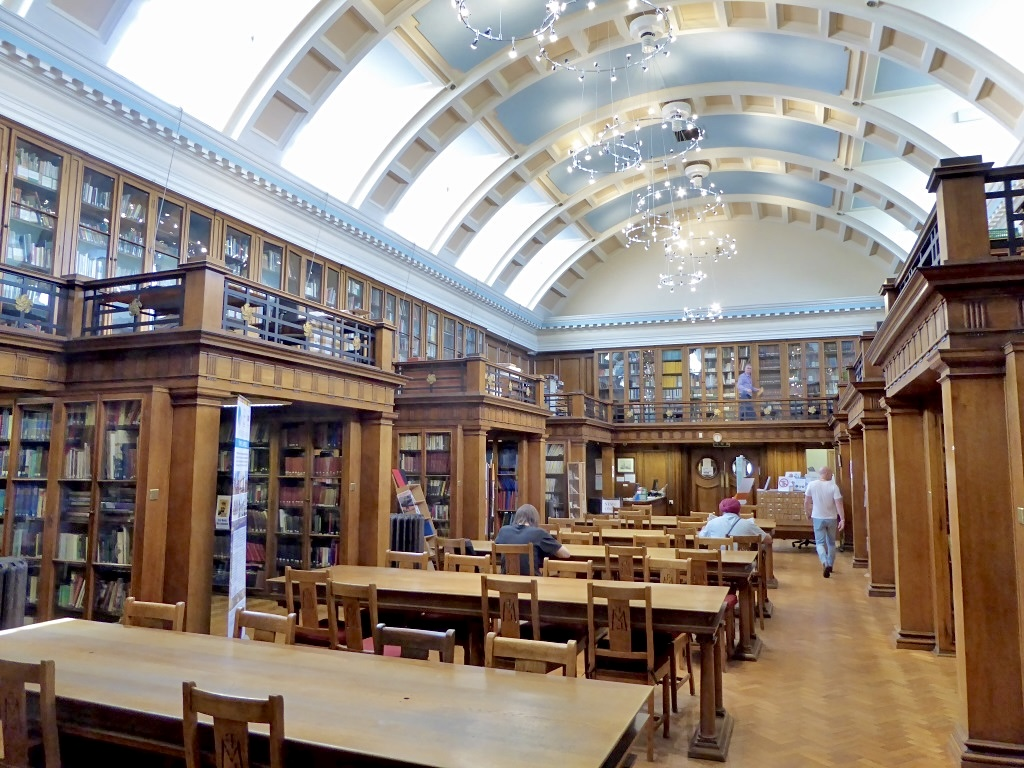
Inside the public library reference room

There are several libraries that serve the town. A notable library is the Middlesbrough Central Carnegie library, which dates from 1912.

== Landmarks ==
There are 129 listed buildings in the council area. Acklam Hall is the only one at Grade I, and 11 are at Grade II*, including the town hall and the Tees Transporter Bridge.

=== Buildings ===
Buildings of Middlesbrough
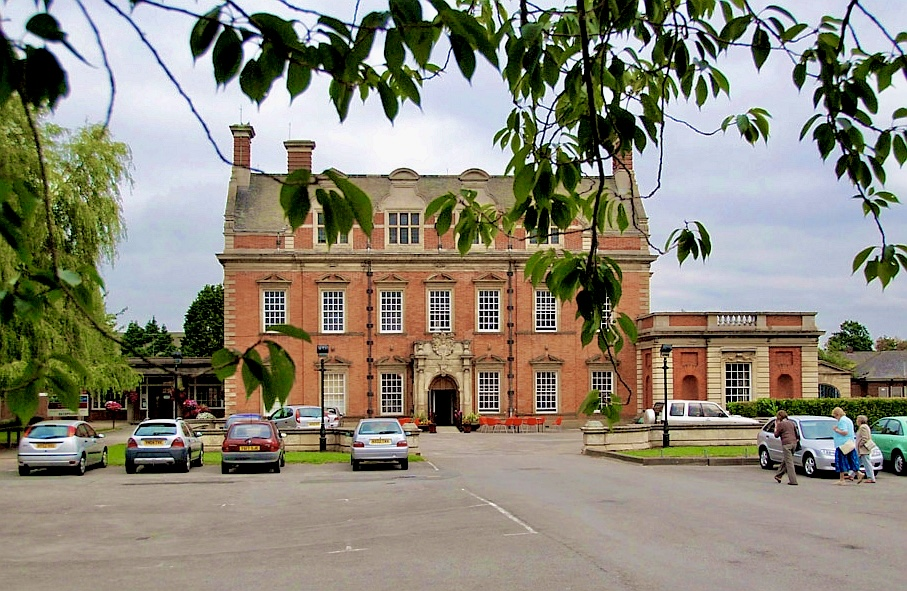
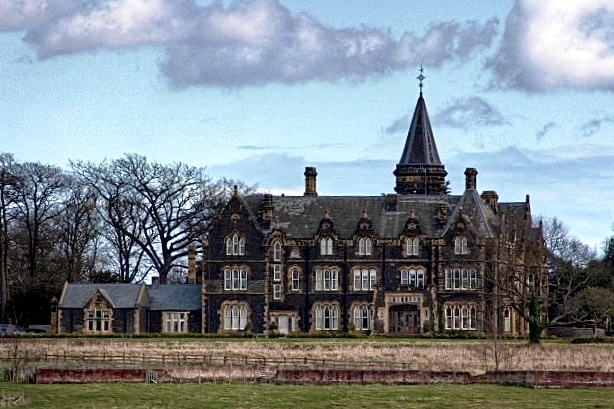
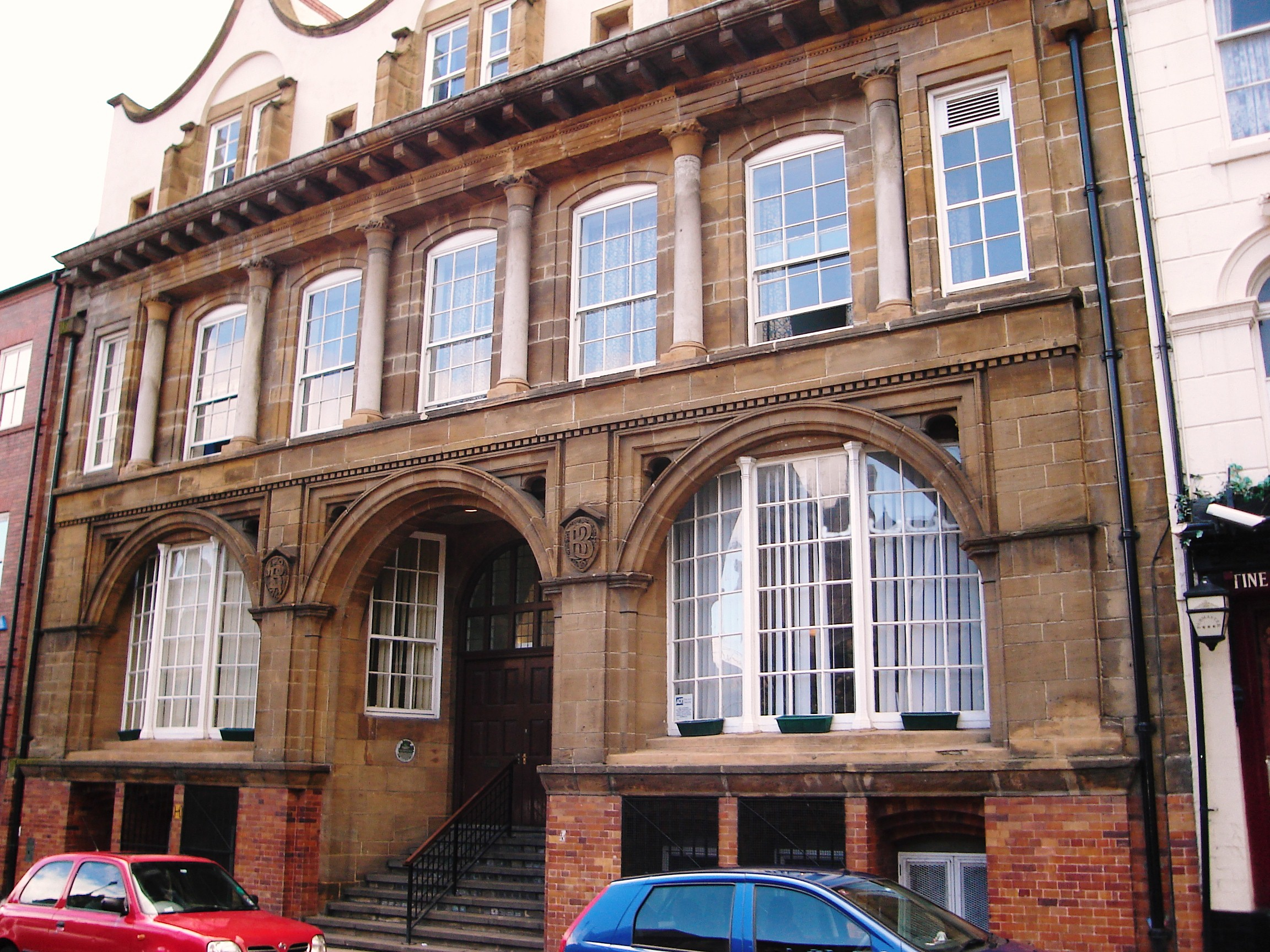
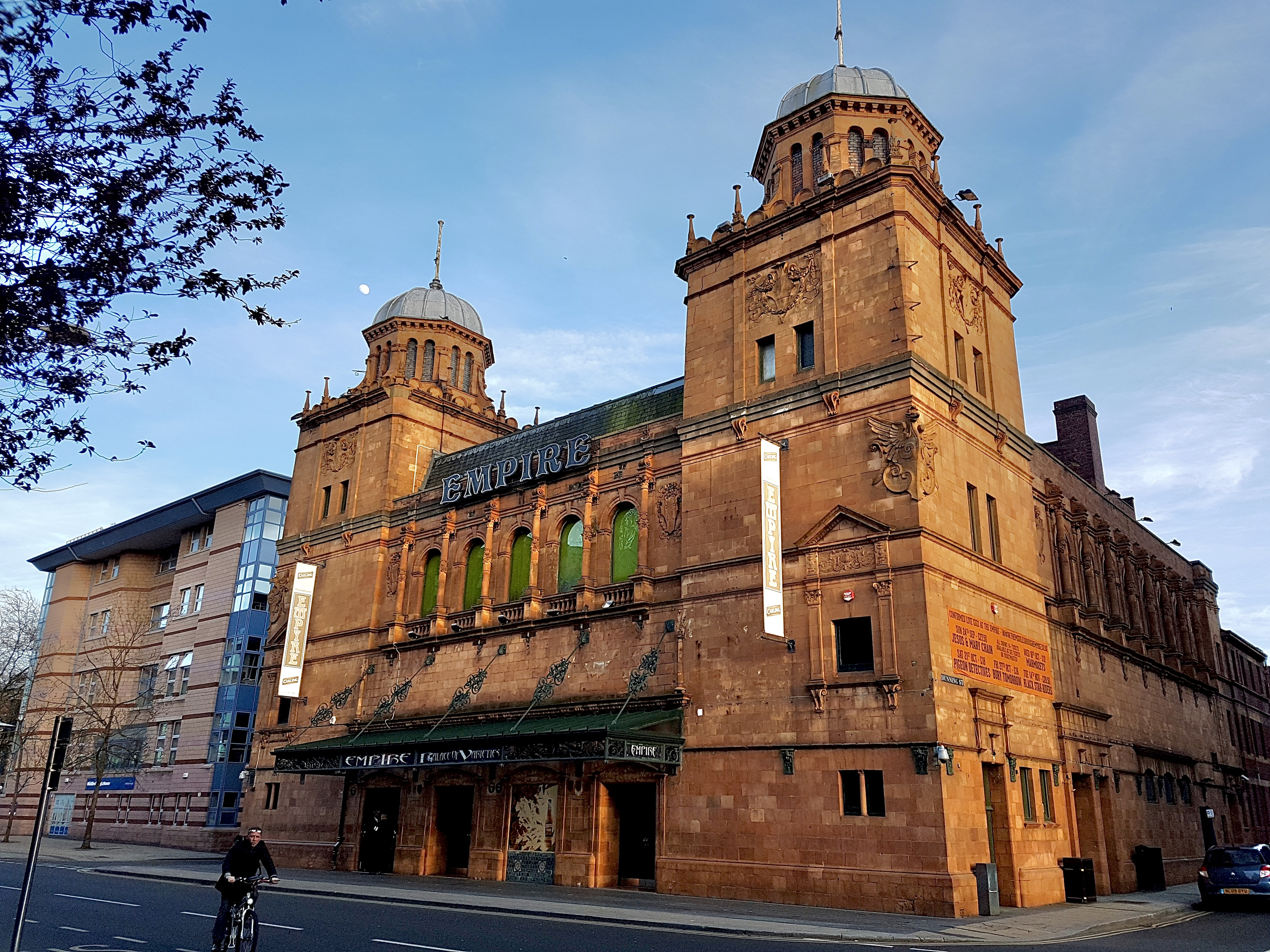
Landmarks from top left to bottom right:
Acklam Hall, Grey Towers, Webb House/ The Dorman Long Office and The Middlesbrough Empire

The terraced Victorian streets surrounding the town centre are elements of Middlesbrough's social and historical identity, and the vast streets surrounding Parliament Road and Abingdon Road a reminder of the area's wealth and rapid growth during industrialisation.

The outer areas of the town have several country halls, most are of Victorian origin. Former halls include Marton Hall (on the grounds of Stewart Park), Gunnergate Hall (Coulby Newham), Tollesby Hall and Park End House. Halls that are still extant, such as Newham Hall, Nunthorpe Hall, Grey Towers and Coulby Manor. The oldest domestic building is Acklam Hall of 1678. Built by Sir William Hustler, it is also the only Grade I listed building in Midddlesbrough.

Middlesbrough Town Hall, designed by George Gordon Hoskins and built between 1883 and 1889 is a Grade II* listed building used for municipal purposes and as an entertainment venue. The Middlesbrough Empire was designed by Ernest Runtz; it was built in 1897 as a theatre and has been a nightclub since 1993 The first artist to perform in building as a Music Hall was Lillie Langtry. It became an early nightclub (1950s), then a bingo hall and is now once again a nightclub. The Middlesbrough Theatre, in Linthorpe, was opened by Sir John Gielgud in 1957; it was one of the first new theatres built in England after the Second World War.

The Dorman Long office on Zetland Road, constructed between 1881 and 1891, is the only commercial building ever designed by Philip Webb, the architect who worked for Sir Isaac Lowthian Bell.

=== Bridges ===
Bridges of Middlesbrough
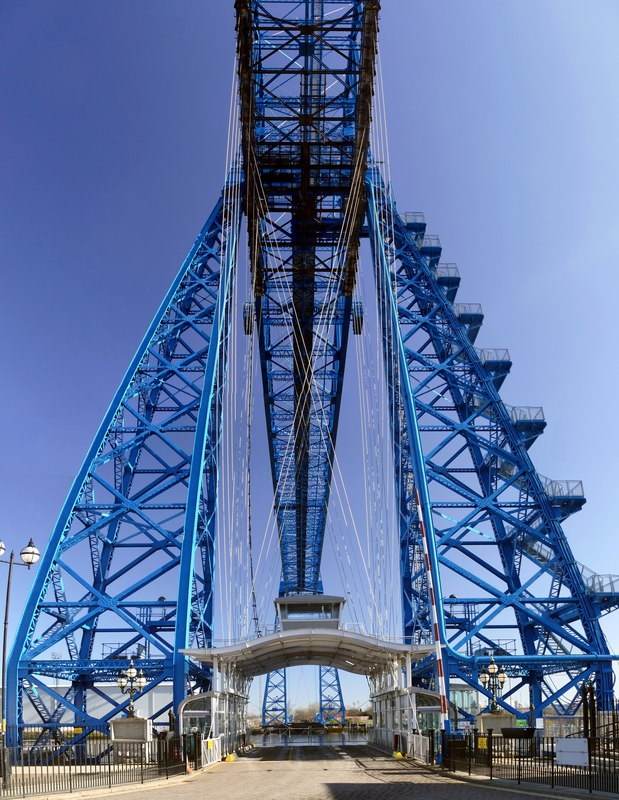
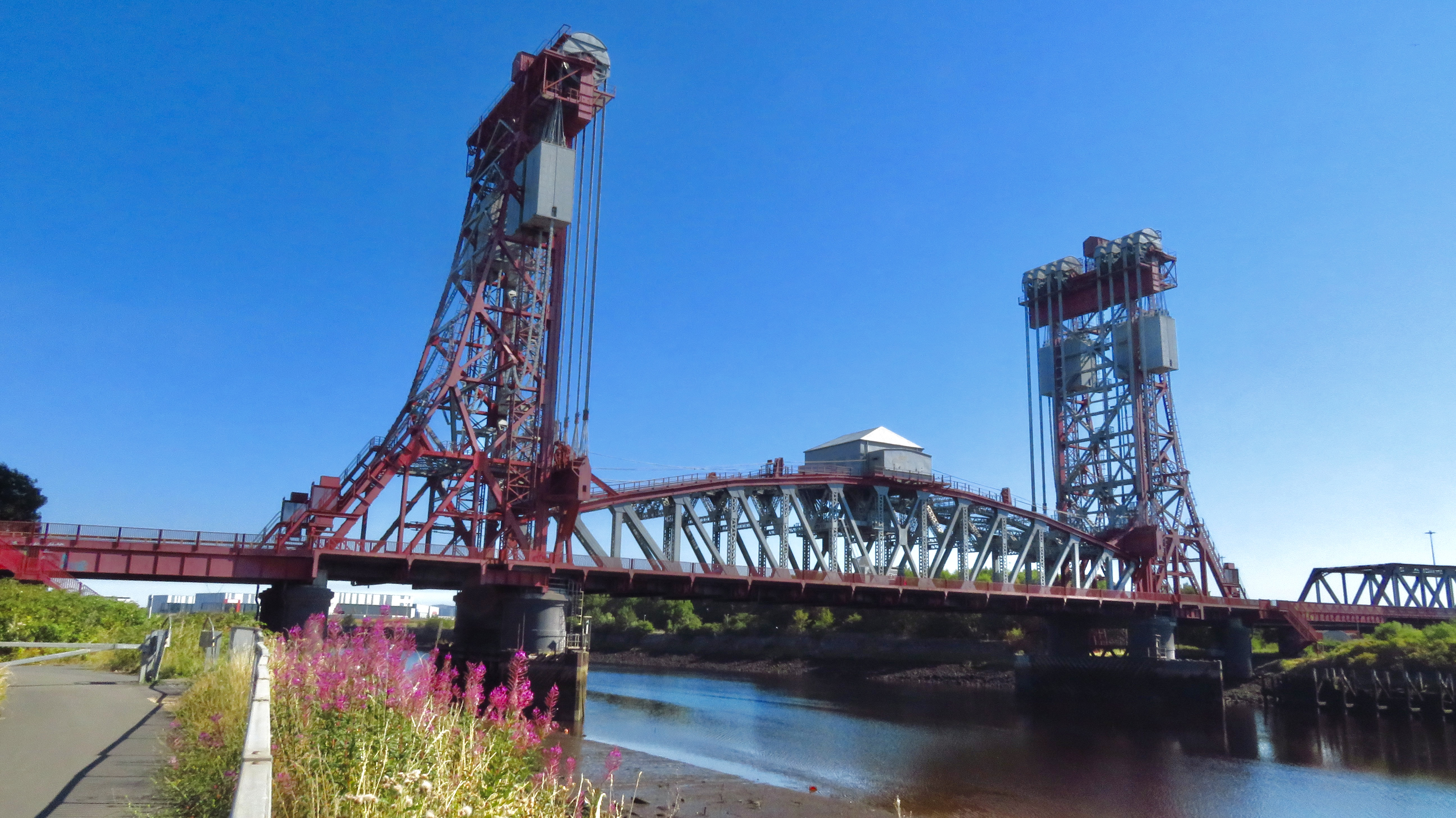
Left: Tees Transporter Bridge, built in 1911
Right: Tees Newport Bridge

Sir William Arrol & Co. of Glasgow built the Tees Transporter Bridge (1911), via a 1907 Act of Parliament, which spans the river between Middlesbrough and Port Clarence. It is a Grade II* listed building. Some of the film Billy Elliot was filmed on the bridge. At 850 feet (260 m) long and 225 feet (69 m) high, it is one of the largest of its type in the world. Since reopening after restoration and flood protection work in 2013 and 2015 the bridge has been closed for long periods due to safety concerns. In August 2022, the mayor of Middlesbrough announced that one of the legs is sinking, and that the estimated costs of repairs have been increasing: the bridge's future remains under consideration.

The Tees Newport Bridge opened further up the river in 1934. Newport bridge still stands and is passable by traffic; it formerly lifted vertically in the centre.

== Education ==
=== University ===
Teesside University traces back to 1930 at the opening of Constantine Technical College, located on Borough Road, in the town centre. The then college expanded through acquiring adjacent buildings, such as Middlesbrough High School, and by building Middlesbrough Tower. It became Teesside Polytechnic in 1969.

In 1992, the polytechnic gained university status, becoming the University of Teesside. Extramural classes had previously been provided by the University of Leeds Adult Education Centre on Harrow Road, from 1958 to 2001. It was rebranded in 2009 to Teesside University. It further expanded in size and courses available, with student numbers increasing to approximately 20,000 studying at the university in 2018.

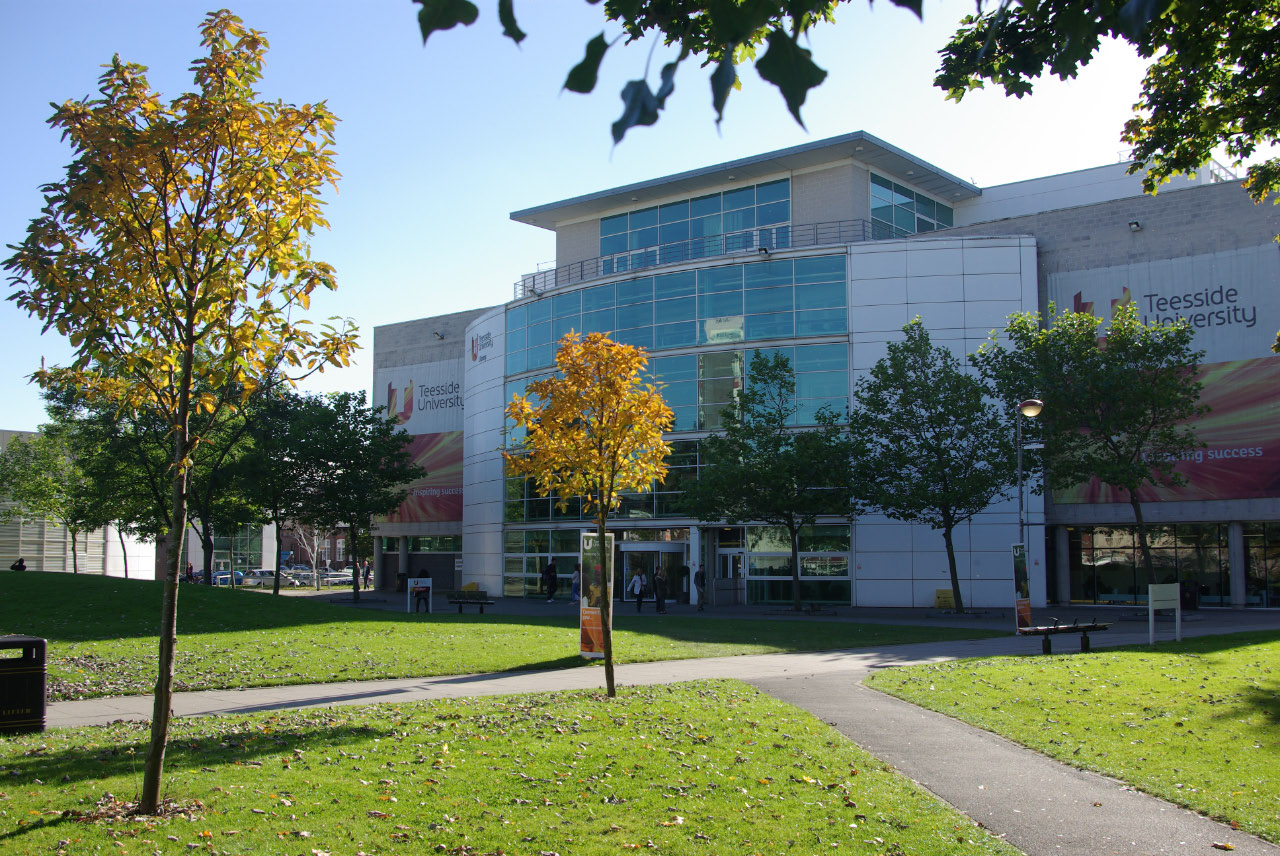
Teesside University Library

The university is a major presence in the town. It has a growing reputation for developing digital businesses particularly in the field of digital animation and for hosting the Animex festival.

The Boho zone in the town now houses a large number of these start-up digital businesses. The university has 18,000 students, 2,400 staff and operates a campus in Middlesbrough town-centre; it has benefited from around £250 million of investment in recent years, including the £30 million Campus Heart scheme.

The university supports a total of 2,570 full-time jobs across the Tees Valley, North East and UK economies per annum. The university contributes additional wealth to the local, regional and national economies as measured by Gross Value Added (GVA). It is estimated this contributes a total of £124 million GVA per annum. The total direct, indirect and induced spending impacts associated with full-time international students and UK students from outside of the North East is approximately £18.9 million per annum. It is estimated this spending supports 158 full-time jobs per annum in Tees Valley and contributes additional wealth of £9.3 million per annum to the local economy.

Current university departments include: Business, Arts and Media, Computing, Health and Life Sciences, Science and Engineering, and Social Sciences and Law. In addition to teaching computer animation and games design, it co-hosts the annual Animex International Festival of Animation and Computer Games. The university has links with James Cook University Hospital in the town.

=== Other institutions ===
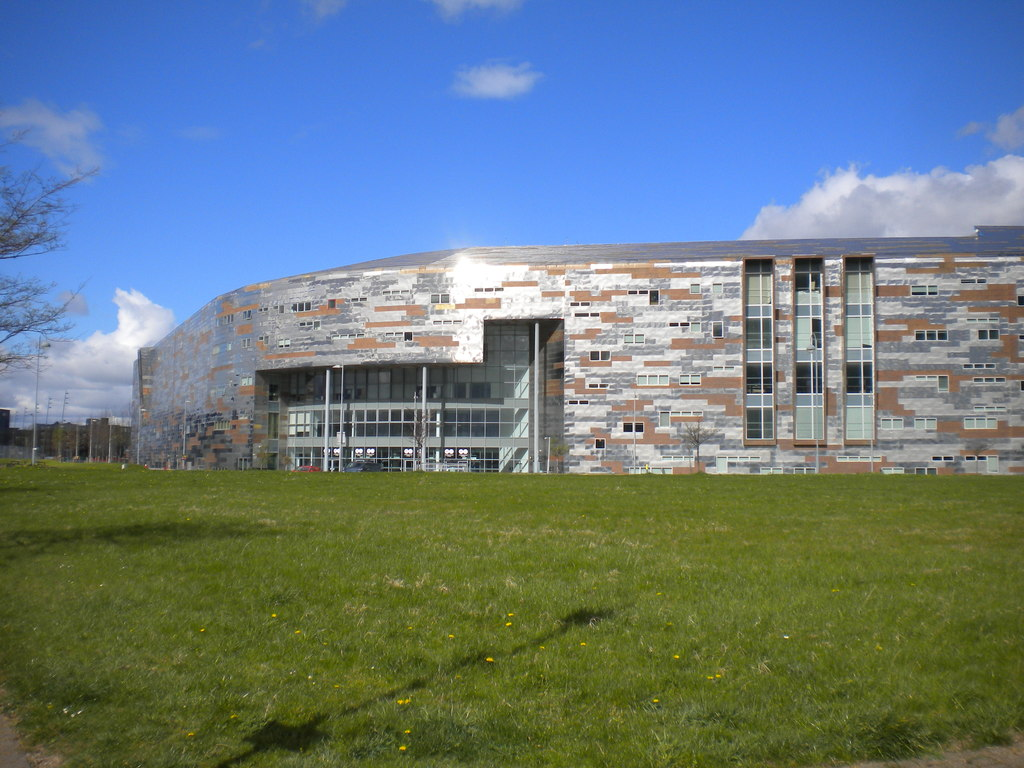
Middlesbrough College

The town's largest college is Middlesbrough College, with 16,000 students. Others include Trinity Catholic College in Saltersgill, Macmillan Academy on Stockton Road and Askham Bryan College, which has a site in Stewart Park.

The Northern School of Art, established in 1870 is also based in Middlesbrough; it has another site in Hartlepool. It is one of only four specialist art and design further education colleges in the United Kingdom.

== Transport ==
=== Railway ===
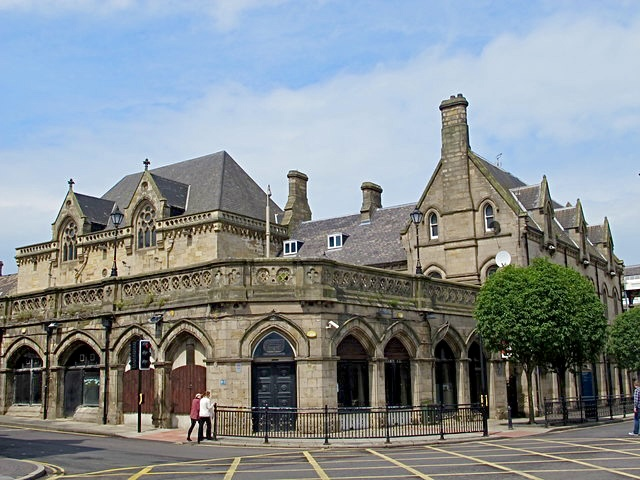
The main station building, viewed from Albert Road

Middlesbrough railway station is the fourth busiest in the North East region. It opened in 1877 at its current site and was built in the Gothic architectural style. It is the Esk Valley line's northern terminus, the Durham Coast line's southern terminus and is on the Tees Valley line.

The station is served by three train operating companies:

- Northern Trains operates local stopping services to Newcastle, Sunderland, Darlington, Redcar Central and Whitby
- TransPennine Express provides services to Leeds, York, Manchester Piccadilly and Manchester Airport
- London North Eastern Railway operates limited inter-city services to Thornaby, York and London Kings Cross.

Other stations in Middlesbrough are Nunthorpe, Gypsy Lane, Marton and James Cook (Note: This station is sited near to James Cook University Hospital.), which are stops on the Esk Valley Line. South Bank is a stop on the Tees Valley Line.

=== Buses ===
Arriva North East and Stagecoach North East provide the majority of bus services in the area, connecting the town with Durham, Newcastle, Nunthorpe, Stockton and Whitby. National Express and FlixBus operate long-distance coach routes from Middlesbrough bus station, including to London, Sunderland, Newcastle, Manchester, Edinburgh and Glasgow.

=== Air ===
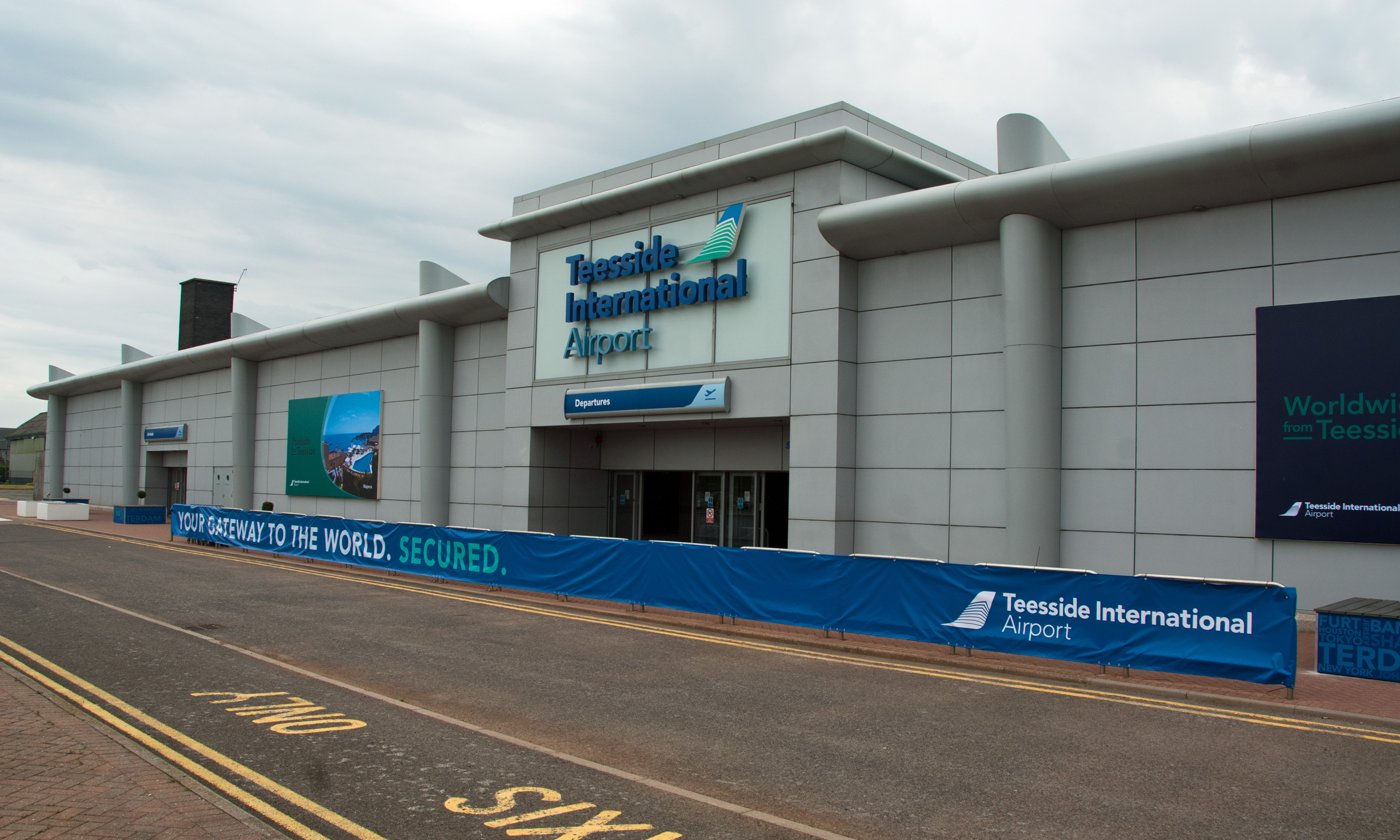
Teesside Airport

Teesside, Newcastle and Leeds Bradford are the closest international airports to the town; they are all connected by a railway journey with at least one change. Manchester Airport is connected directly by TransPennine Express's railway service.

=== Roads ===
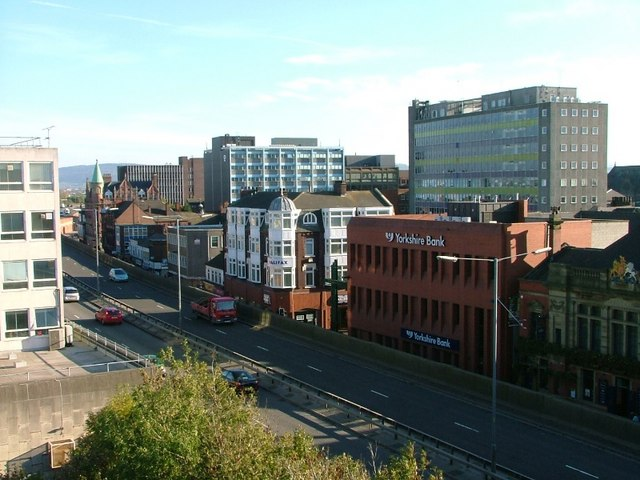
A66 from a multi-storey car park; the road is raised with Wilson Street running adjacent (2006)

Middlesbrough is served by a number of major roads:

- A19 (north–south) passes to the west of the town
- A66 (east–west) runs through the northern part of the town centre
- A171, A172 and A174 are other main routes linking the town.

The A19 / A66 major interchange lies just to the west of the town.

=== Paths ===
Several long-distance footpaths pass near to the town.

Two paths from Cumbria are:

- Teesdale Way - which goes through the town to South Gare; it is part of the E2 European long distance path
- Coast to Coast Walk - a national trail between St Bees and Robin Hood Bay via Great Broughton.

Two paths include Roseberry Topping on their routes:

- Cleveland Way, a national trail around the North York Moors, between Helmsley and Filey
- White Rose Walk between the hill and Kilburn Horse.

A trial e-scooter hire system is operating in Middlesbrough during 2020.

=== Trams ===
The town had electric tramway services between 1921 and 1934, operated by the Middlesbrough Corporation Tramways.

== Religion ==
=== Christianity ===
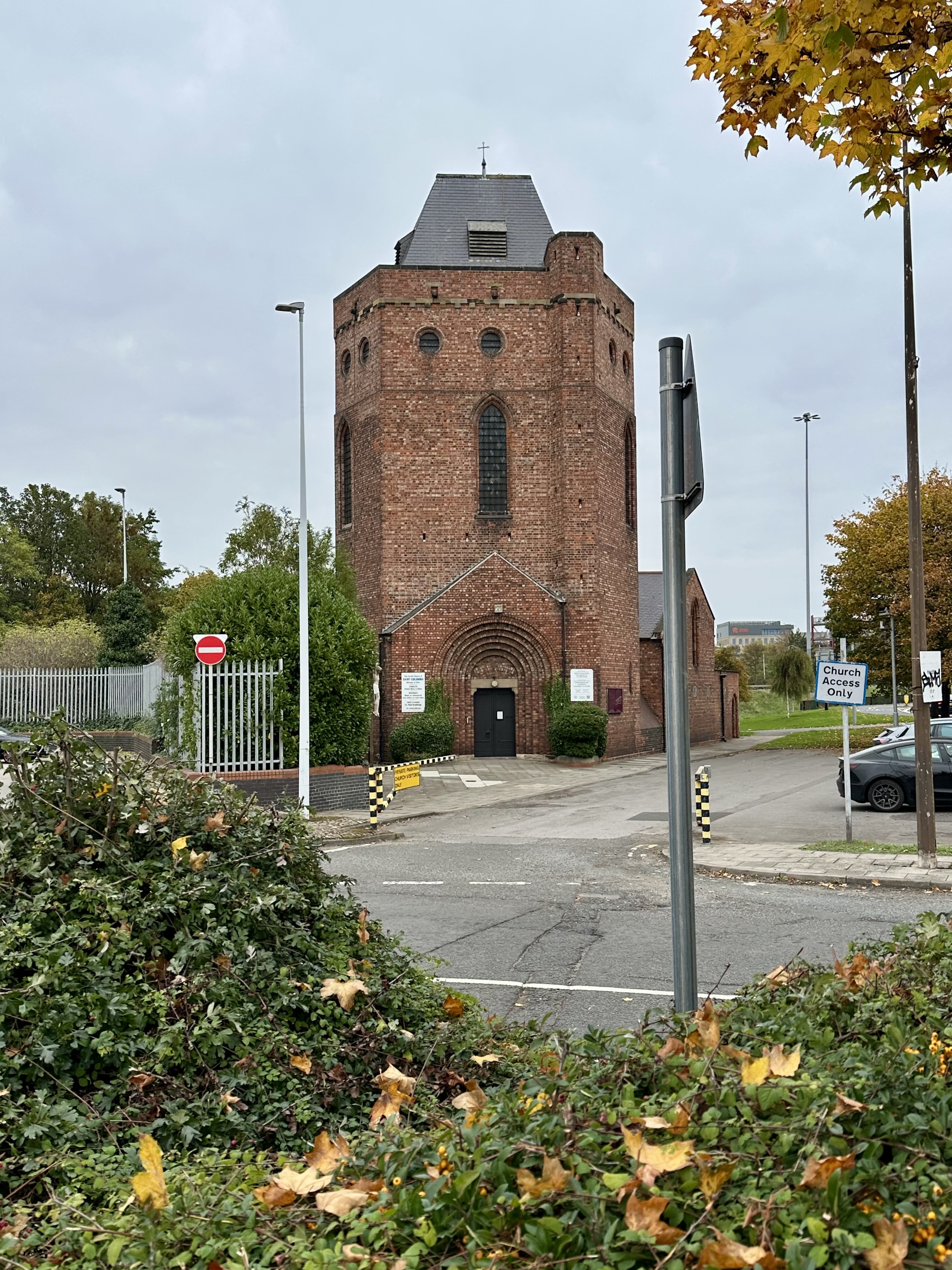
St Columba's Church CoE

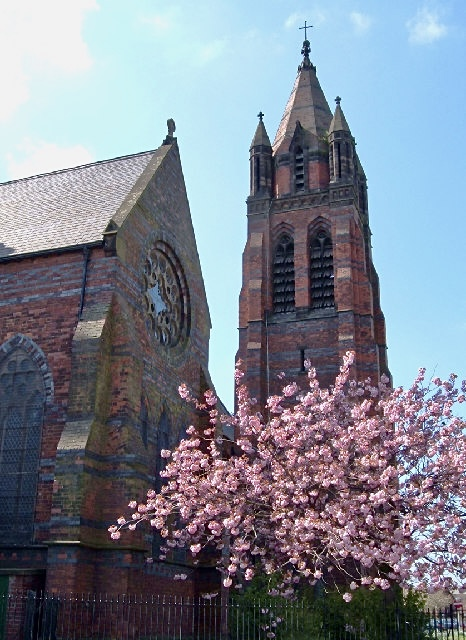
St John's Church CoE

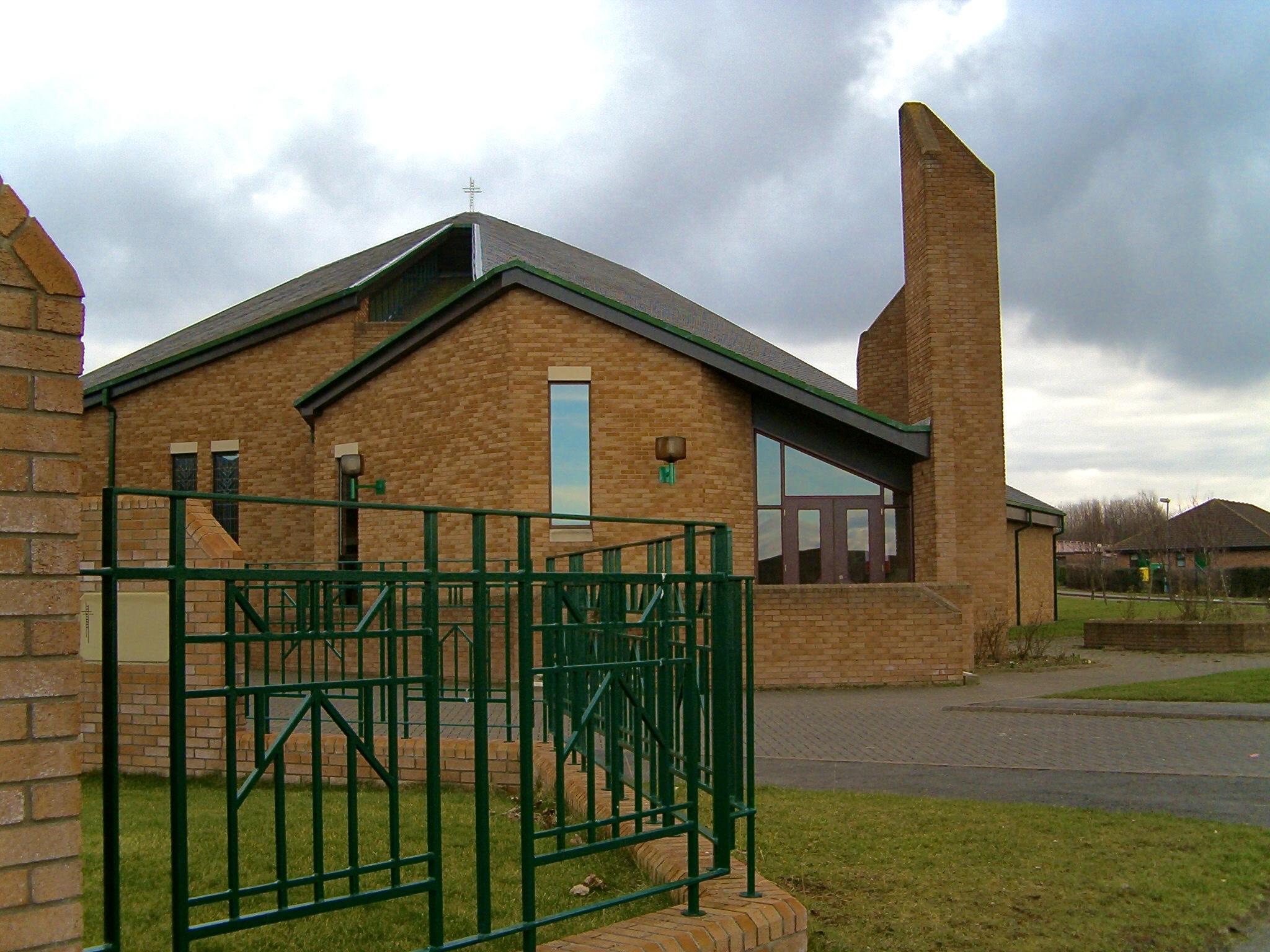
St Mary's Cathedral RC

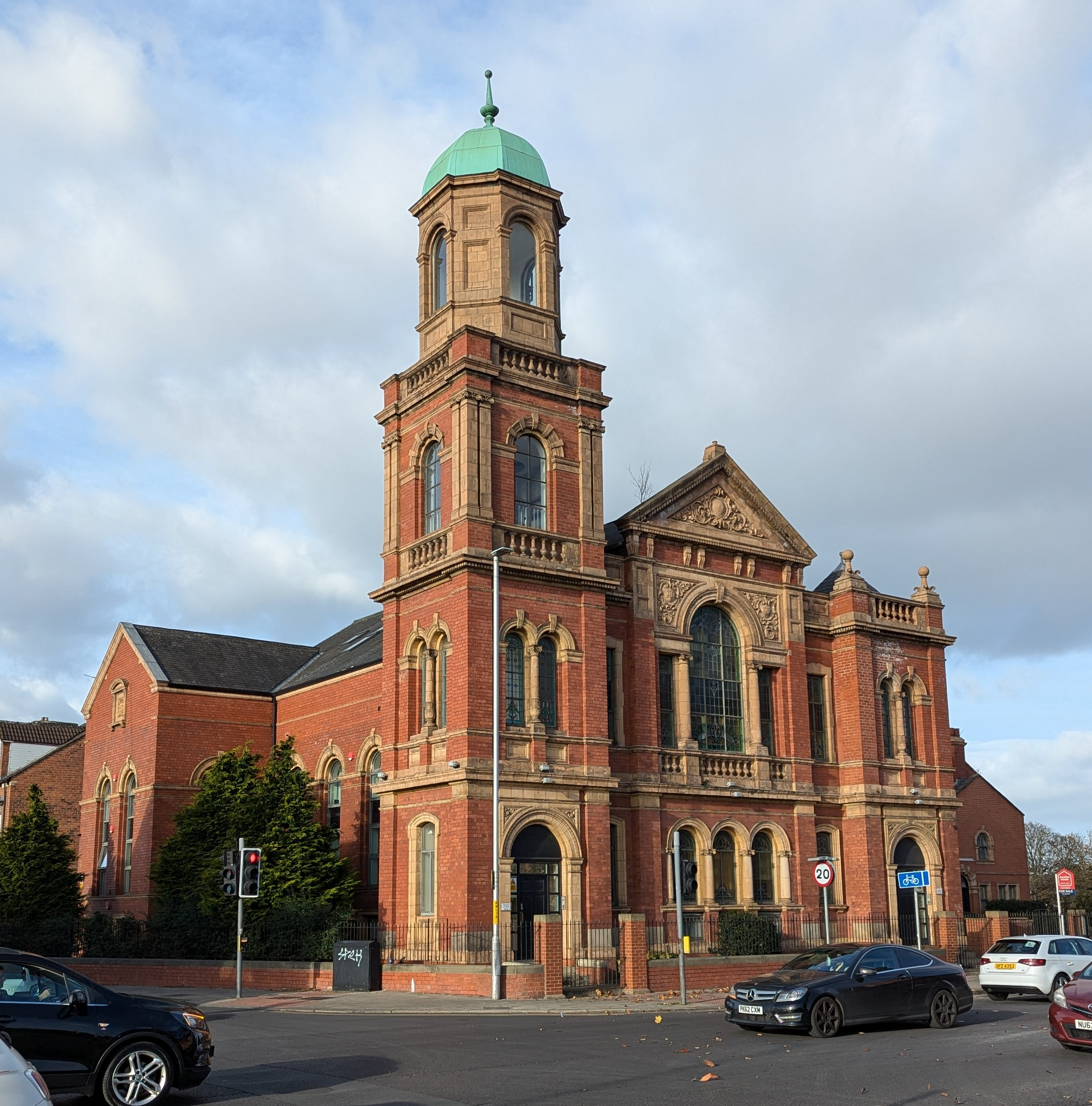
Park Methodist Church, now housing

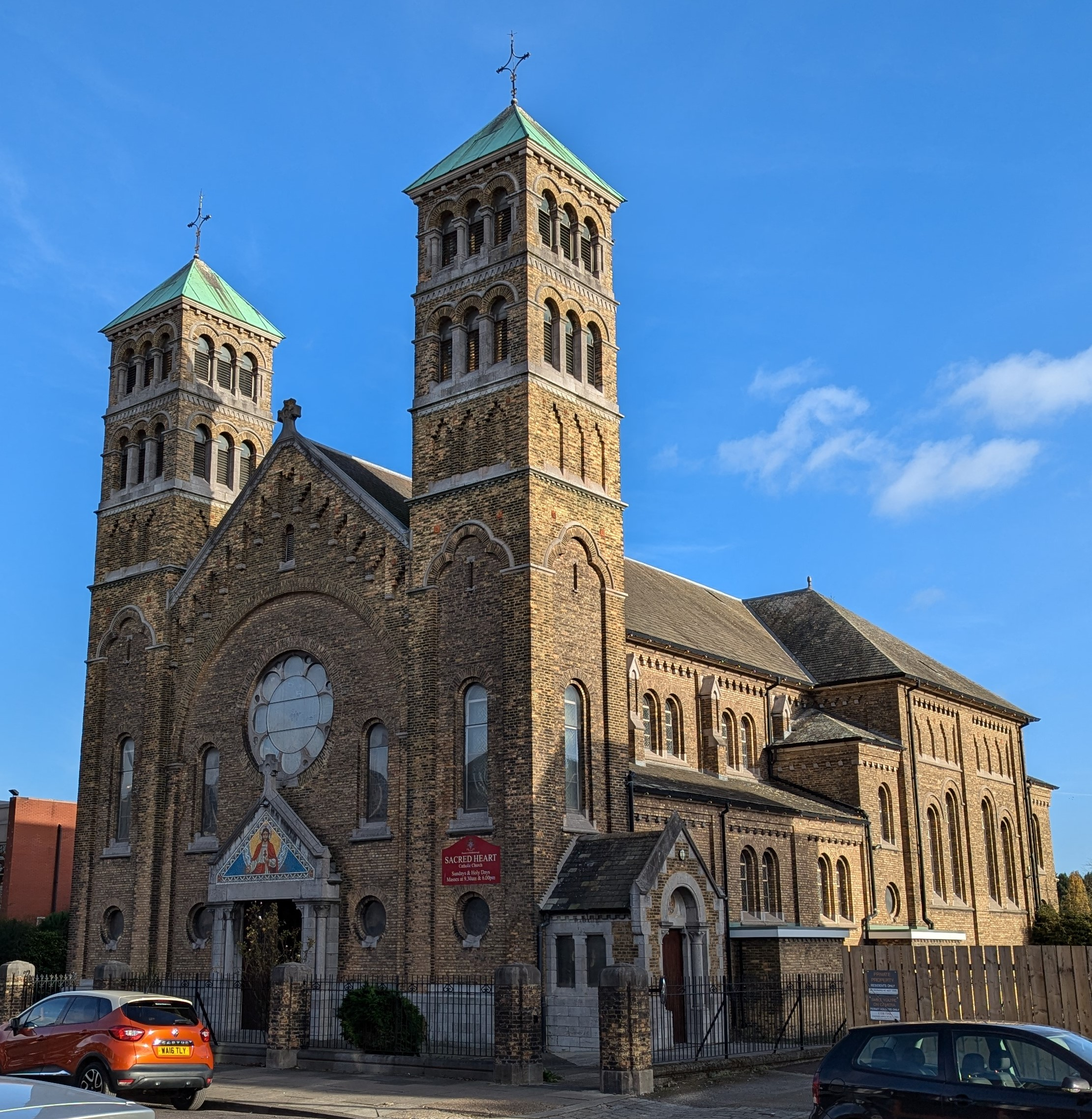
Sacred Heart RC Church

Hierarchy
Denomination	Top tier	2nd	3rd	4th
Church of England	Province of York	Diocese of York	Archdeaconry of Cleveland	Deanery of Middlesbrough
Roman Catholic	Archdiocese of Liverpool	Diocese of Middlesbrough	Northern Vicariate	
Methodist	District of Darlington		Circuit of Middlesbrough and Eston	

The Church of England Middlesbrough deanery is in the Archdeaconry of Cleveland with Stokesley (west), Guisborough (east), Whitby (south east) and Northern Ryedale (south) and Mowbray (south west). It is in the Diocese of York and Province of York.

The town is the seat of the Roman Catholic Diocese of Middlesbrough, created on 20 December 1878 from the Diocese of Beverley. St. Mary's Cathedral is the diocese's mother church, it is in Coulby Newham and replaced the original St Mary's in the town centre. Right Reverend Terence Patrick Drainey retired as the 7th Bishop of Middlesbrough on 22 December 2025, and the Bishop of Leeds, Marcus Stock, was appointed as Apostolic Administrator of the Diocese of Middlesbrough in his place. Churches dedicated to the Sacred Heart, St Bernadette and St Clare of Assisi are also in the town.

=== Judaism ===
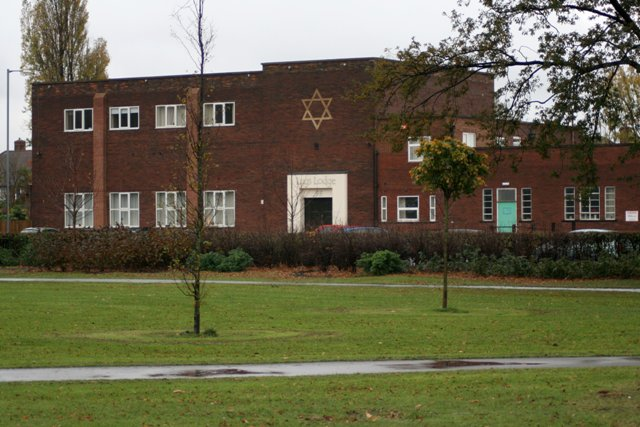
The synagogue in Park Road South, which opened in 1938 and closed in 1998

Middlesbrough once held a Jewish population large enough to sustain one Orthodox synagogue, though that congregation went defunct in 1998. Ashkenazi Jews from Poland and Russia started to settle in the town from 1862 and formed Middlesbrough Hebrew Congregation in 1870 with a temporary synagogue in the upstairs portion of a boot and shoe shop in Hill Street. The synagogue constructed its own building in Brentnall Street in 1874. Upon commencing construction of the new building, the local paper reported "the Jew could lay the foundation stone of his synagogue today in Middlesbrough with as great a sense of freedom as Solomon felt when he laid the foundation stone of his glorious temple in Jerusalem well nigh 3000 years ago and without even that sense of exile which possessed his ancestors when they sat down by the waters of Babylon and wept." It moved to a new building in Park Road South in 1938.

The community reported generally harmonious relations with the non-Jewish community, including local churches. One Orthodox Jewish family reported especially friendly relations with vicar Wareham of St. Barnabas church, often giving him matzos at Passover to teach his congregation, and receiving gifts of petrol to help with visits to Jewish congregation after air raids.

In 1939, the Jewish community opened a refugee hostel for girls rescued from the Nazis after the Kristallnacht in Austria and Germany. A UK programme called Kindertransport had brought up to 10,000 mostly Jewish children to Britain in 1938-39. The hostel was home for between 16 and 25 girls and was funded voluntarily rather than by the government.

There are two Jewish cemeteries; the older one has plots dting from 1885.

Editions of the Jewish Year Book record the growth and decline of Middlesbrough's Jewish population. It was about 100 in 1896–97 and peaked at 750 in 1935. It then declined to 30 in 1998, when the synagogue in Park Road South was ceremonially closed. The decline of the Jewish population is part of a larger pattern also seen in Newcastle and Sunderland, caused by younger Jews moving to the bigger cities, such as London, for more opportunities and more liberal or reform congregations.

=== Islam ===
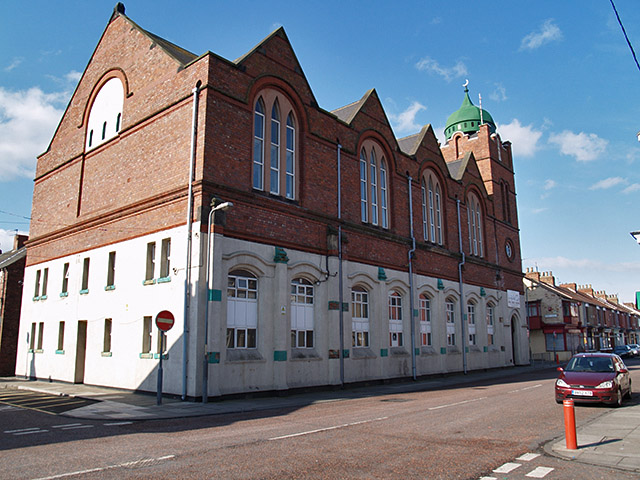
Jamia Mosque, Waterloo Road

The Muslim community is represented in several mosques in Middlesbrough. Muslim sailors visited the town from about 1890 and, in 1961, Azzam and Younis Din opened the first Halal butcher shop.

The first mosque was a house in Grange Road in 1962. There are around seven in Middlesbrough; the most prominent of which are the Al-Madina Jamia Mosque, on Waterloo Road; the Dar ul Islam Central Mosque, on Southfield Road; and the Abu Bakr Mosque & Community Centre, which is currently temporarily situated on Cannon Park Way.

=== Sikhism ===
The Sikh community established its first gurdwara in Milton Street in 1967. After a time in Southfield Road, the centre is now in Lorne Street and was opened in 1990.

=== Hinduism ===
There is a Hindu Cultural Centre in Westbourne Grove, North Ormesby, which was opened in 1990.

== Culture ==
=== Festivals and fairs ===
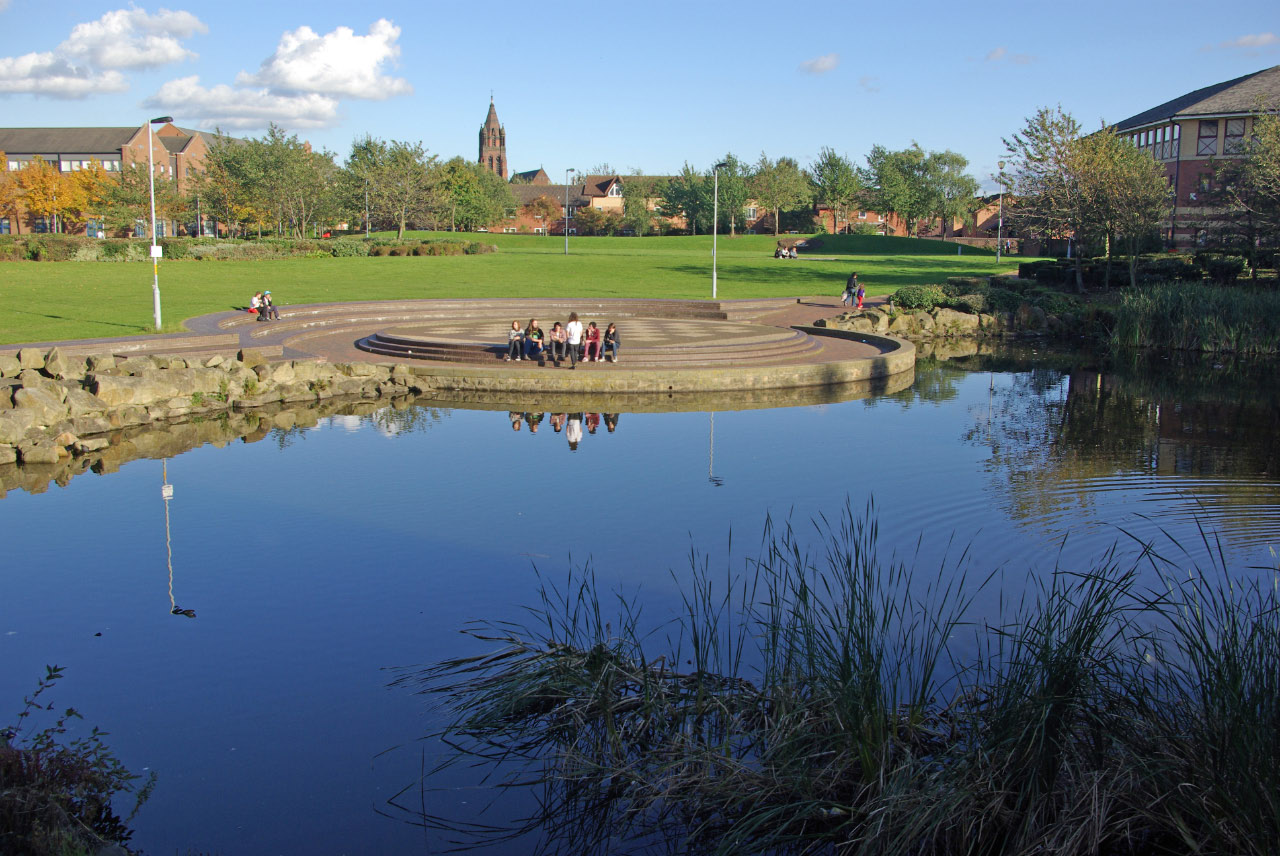
Wilkinson Lake

The Middlesbrough Mela is an annual, multi-cultural festival attracting an audience of up to 40,000 to enjoy a mix of live music, food, craft and fashion stalls. It began in Middlesbrough's Central Gardens, now Centre Square, and is either held there or in Albert Park.

=== Theatres and music venues ===
Middlesbrough also has a healthy musical heritage. A number of bands and musicians hail from the area, including Chris Rea, Paul Rodgers and Micky Moody.

Middlesbrough Town Hall is the pre-eminent theatre venue. It has two concert halls: a classic Victorian concert hall with a proscenium stage and seating 1,190; the other, under the main hall, is called the Middlesbrough Crypt and has a capacity of up to 600. The venue is run by Middlesbrough Council and is funded, in part, by Arts Council England as a National Portfolio Organisation specialising in music. It was refurbished with the assistance of the National Lottery Heritage Fund and reopened in 2018.

The Middlesbrough Theatre (formerly the Little Theatre) is in the suburb of Linthorpe. It was designed by architects Elder & De Pierro and was the first purpose designed theatre to be erected in post-war England, when it was opened on 22 October 1957 by Sir John Gielgud.

=== Museums ===
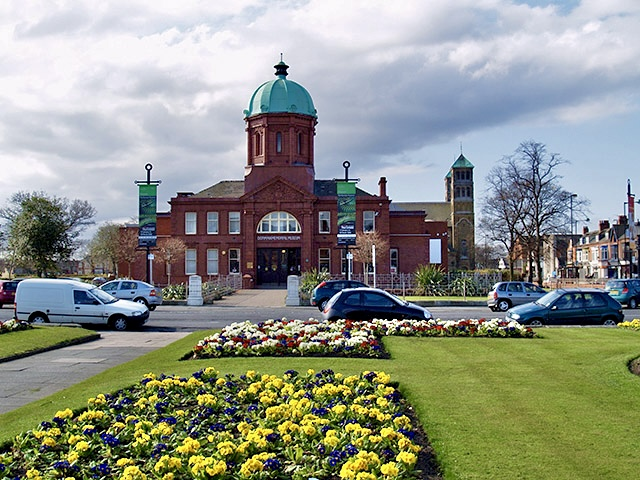
Dorman Museum

The Dorman Memorial Museum, which was founded by Sir Arthur Dorman and specialises in social and local history.

The Captain Cook Birthplace Museum, which was opened on 28 October 1978 in celebration of the 250th anniversary of Captain James Cook's birth in nearby Marton.

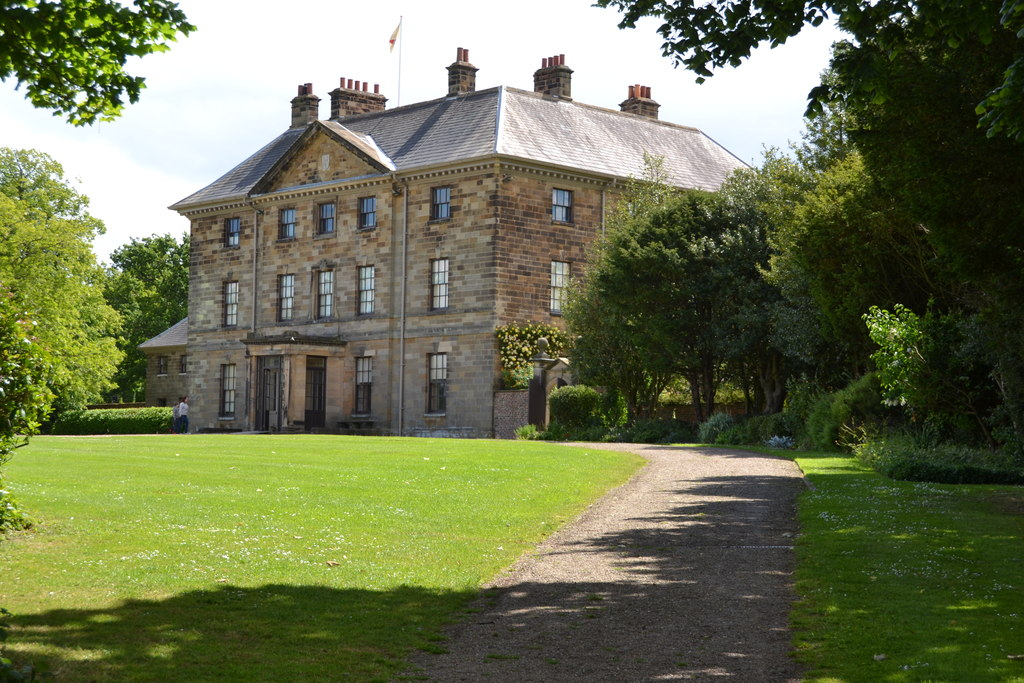
Ormesby Hall

Though just outside the boundary of Middlesbrough, within a joint preservation area with Redcar and Cleveland, Ormesby Hall is an 18th-century palladian mansion, once owned by the Pennyman family; it is now a National Trust property.

In July 2000, the Transporter Bridge Visitor Centre was opened to commemorate the building of the Middlesbrough Transporter Bridge.

=== Arts and galleries ===
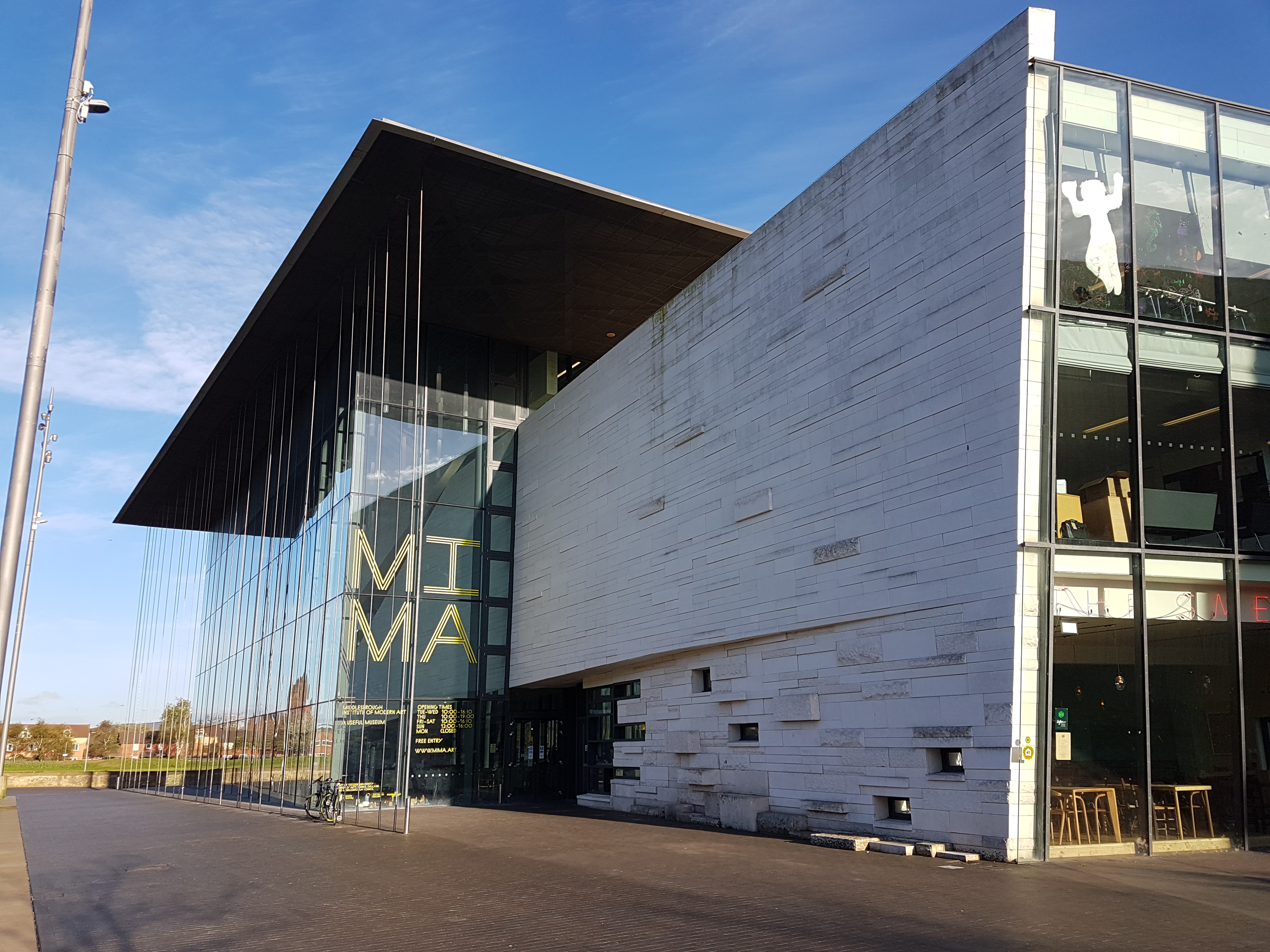
MIMA Gallery

The town has three art galleries. Middlesbrough Institute of Modern Art, known locally as MIMA, is a purpose built contemporary art gallery which opened in January 2007. It replaced the Cleveland Gallery (closed 1999) and Cleveland Crafts Centre (closed 2003).

The Middlesbrough Art Weekender is a contemporary art festival organised by the Auxiliary that has been held in central Middlesbrough since 2017. In 2019, it was held over the weekend of 26–29 September and included the works of artists such as Emily Hesse and Karina Smigla-Bobinski. The Auxiliary Warehouse space, which was opened also as part of the 2019 Middlesbrough Art Weekender, is a recent addition to the contemporary art community.

The Platform A Gallery is a contemporary art space at the end of platform 1 of Middlesbrough station.

=== Cuisine ===
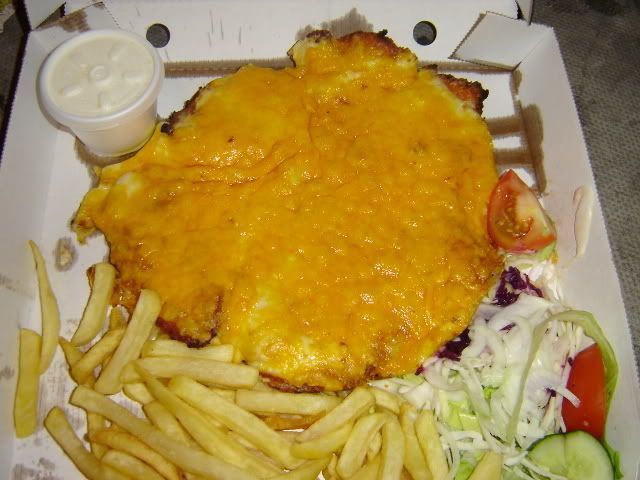
Parmo with chips and salad

The parmo originated in Middlesbrough. It consists of a breaded cutlet of meat with cheese and white sauce toppings; it is widely available at local takeaways.

=== Artworks ===
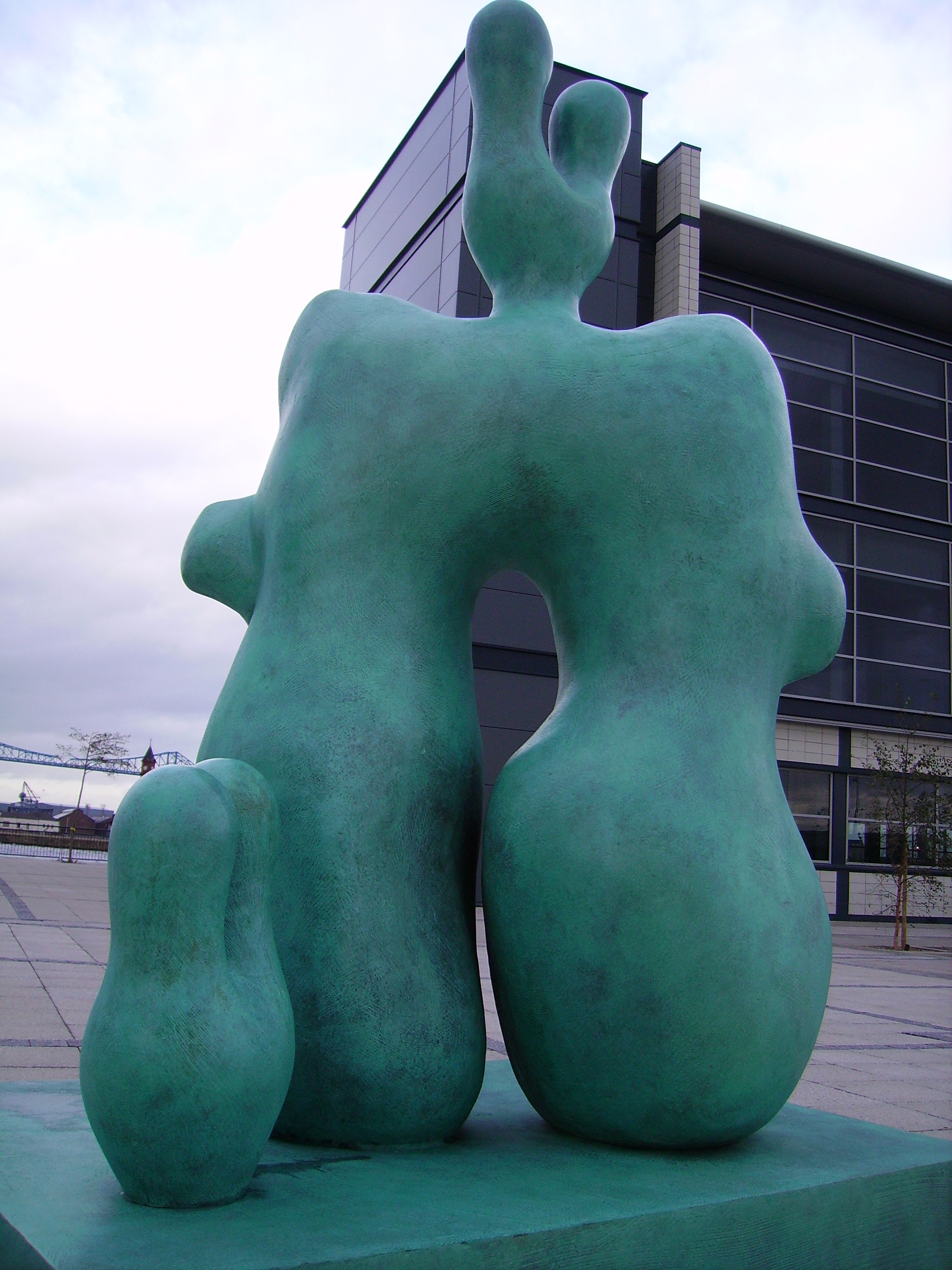
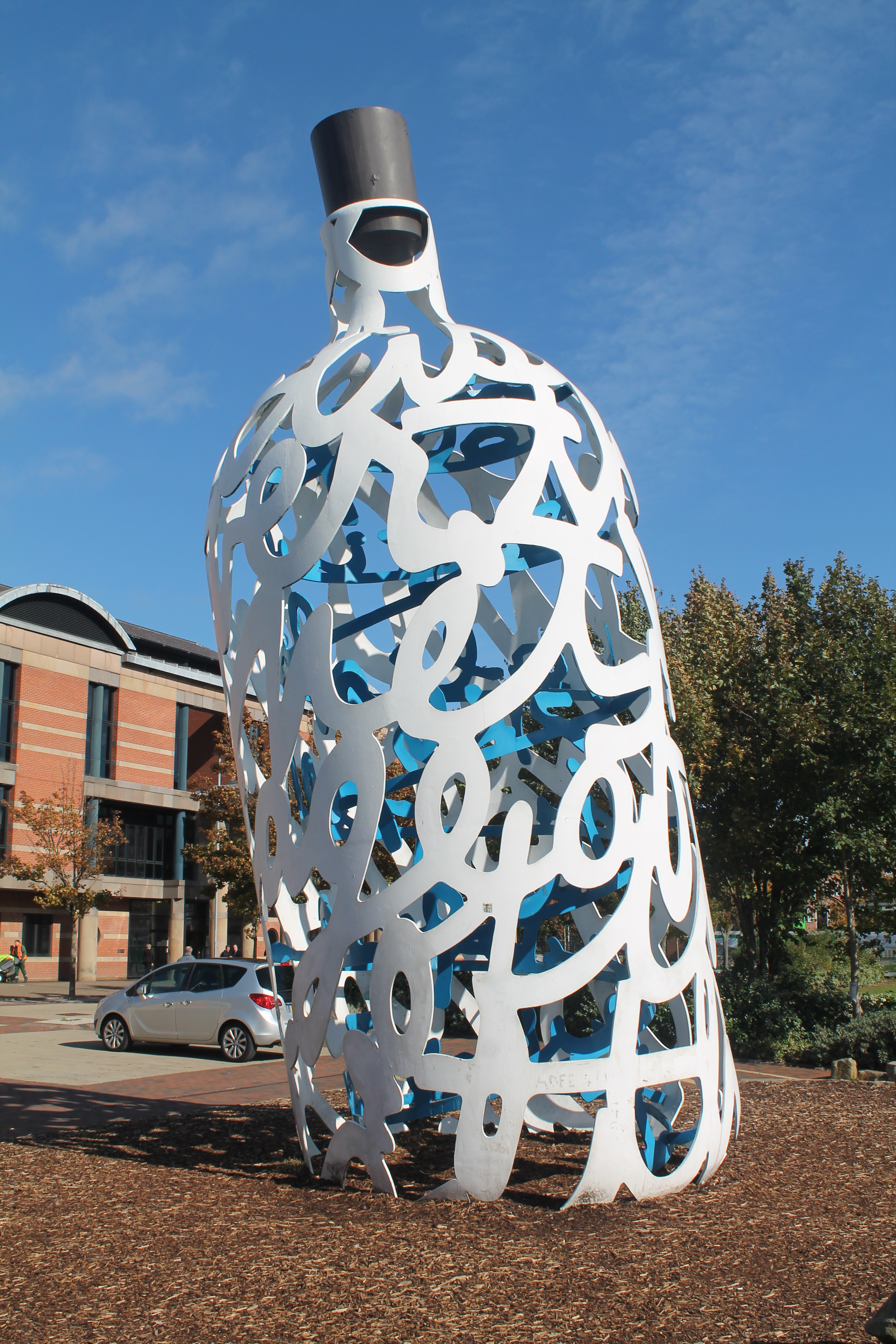
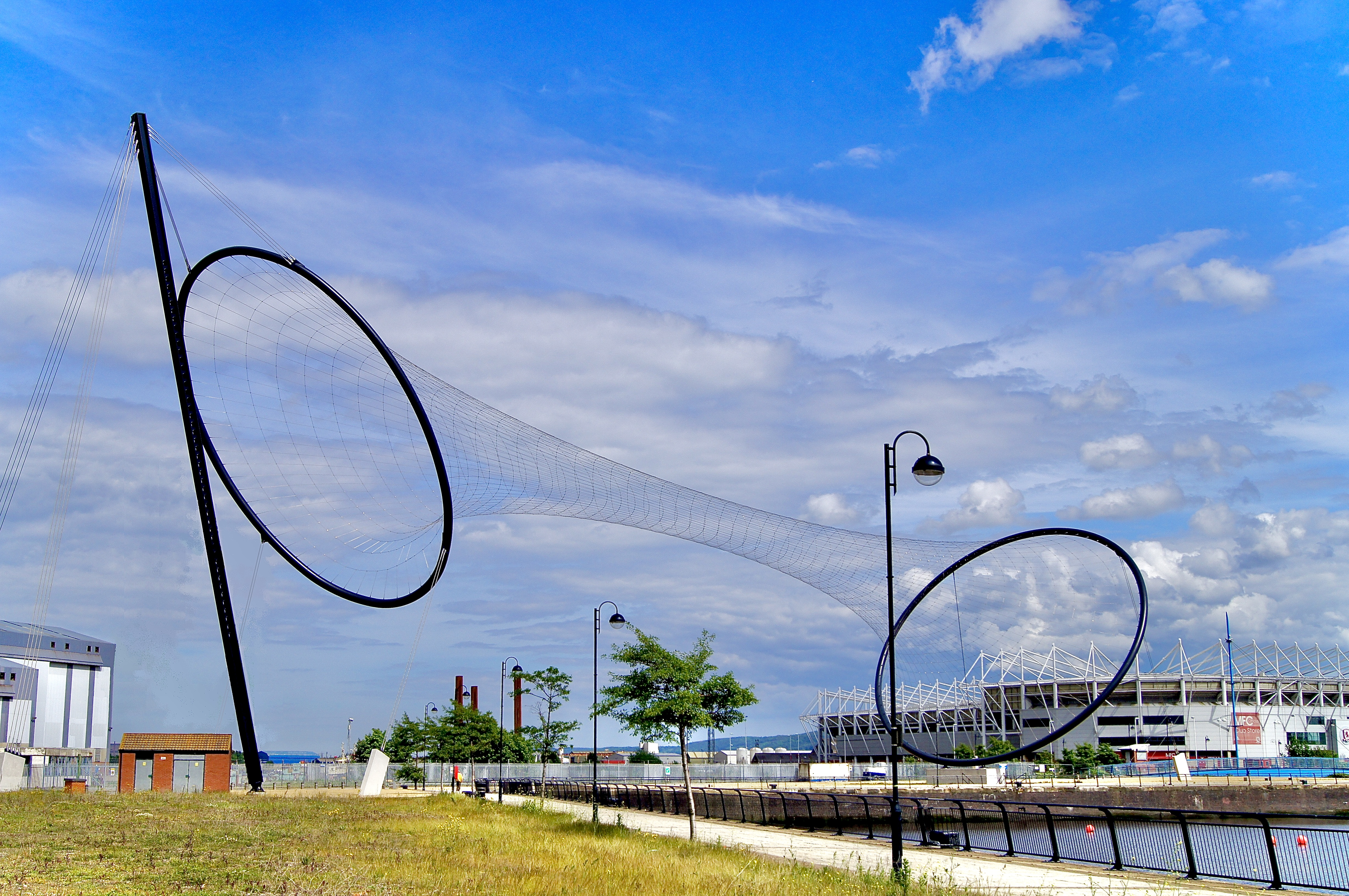
Sculptures: 40,000 Years of Modern Art, Bottle O' Notes and the Temenos Sculpture

The Temenos Sculpture, designed by sculptor Anish Kapoor and designer Cecil Balmond, is sited to the north-west side of the Riverside Stadium. The steel structure, consisting of a pole, a circular ring and an oval ring, stands approximately 110 m long and 50 m high and is held together by steel wire. It was unveiled in 2010 at a cost of £2.7 million.

Near the town hall is the Bottle of Notes; it was unveiled in 1993 and is the UK's only public sculpture by Claes Oldenburg. Drawing on its local surroundings, the sculpture was fabricated in South Tyneside by former ship builders, and its outside is the first line from the journals of Captain James Cook: "We had every advantage we could desire in observing the whole of the passage of the Planet Venus over the Sun's disc." Cook was born in the area in 1728.

== Media ==
Local news and television programmes are BBC North East and Cumbria and ITV Tyne Tees, the local based-television station TalkTeesside also broadcast to the town. Television signals are received from the Bilsdale TV transmitter.

Local radio stations are BBC Radio Tees which broadcasts from its studios on Newport Road, Heart North East, Hits Radio Teesside, Capital North East, Smooth North East, Greatest Hits Radio Teesside and CVFM Radio, a community based station.

Middlesbrough is served by the local newspaper, Evening Gazette.

== In popular culture ==
Middlesbrough has featured in many television programmes, including The Fast Show, Inspector George Gently, Steel River Blues, Spender, Play for Today (The Black Stuff; latterly the drama Boys from the Blackstuff) and Auf Wiedersehen, Pet.

Film director Ridley Scott is from the North East and based the opening shot of Blade Runner on the view of the old ICI plant at Wilton. He said: "There's a walk from Redcar...I'd cross a bridge at night and walk above the steel works. So that's probably where the opening of Blade Runner comes from. It always seemed to be rather gloomy and raining, and I'd just think "God, this is beautiful." You can find beauty in everything, and so I think I found the beauty in that darkness." It has been claimed that the site was also considered as a shooting location for one of the films in Scott's Alien franchise.

In the 2009 action thriller The Tournament, Middlesbrough is that year's location where the assassins' competition is being held. In November 2009, the mima art gallery was used by the presenters of Top Gear as part of a challenge. The challenge was to see if car exhibits would be more popular than normal art.

In 2010, filmmaker John Walsh made the satirical documentary ToryBoy The Movie about the 2010 general election in the Middlesbrough constituency and sitting MP Stuart Bell's alleged laziness as an MP.

In March 2013, Middlesbrough was used as a stand in for 1969 Newcastle in BBC's Inspector George Gently, starring Martin Shaw and Lee Ingleby; the footage appeared in the episode "Gently Between The Lines" (episode 1 of series 6).

In 2024, BBC Comedy commissioned Smoggie Queens from Hat Trick Productions, an "out and out comedy centred around a gang of friends who are fiercely proud of their North Eastern town of Middlesbrough and their small pocket of the LGBTQ+ community." Writer Phil Dunning described the show as "a love letter to the town". The series aired on BBC Three in November 2024.

Television travel presenter and Monty Python member Michael Palin used to cite Middlesbrough as the place he had yet to visit, instead of referencing a more exotic place. In 2015, Palin did finally visit Middlesbrough.

== Sport ==
=== Football ===
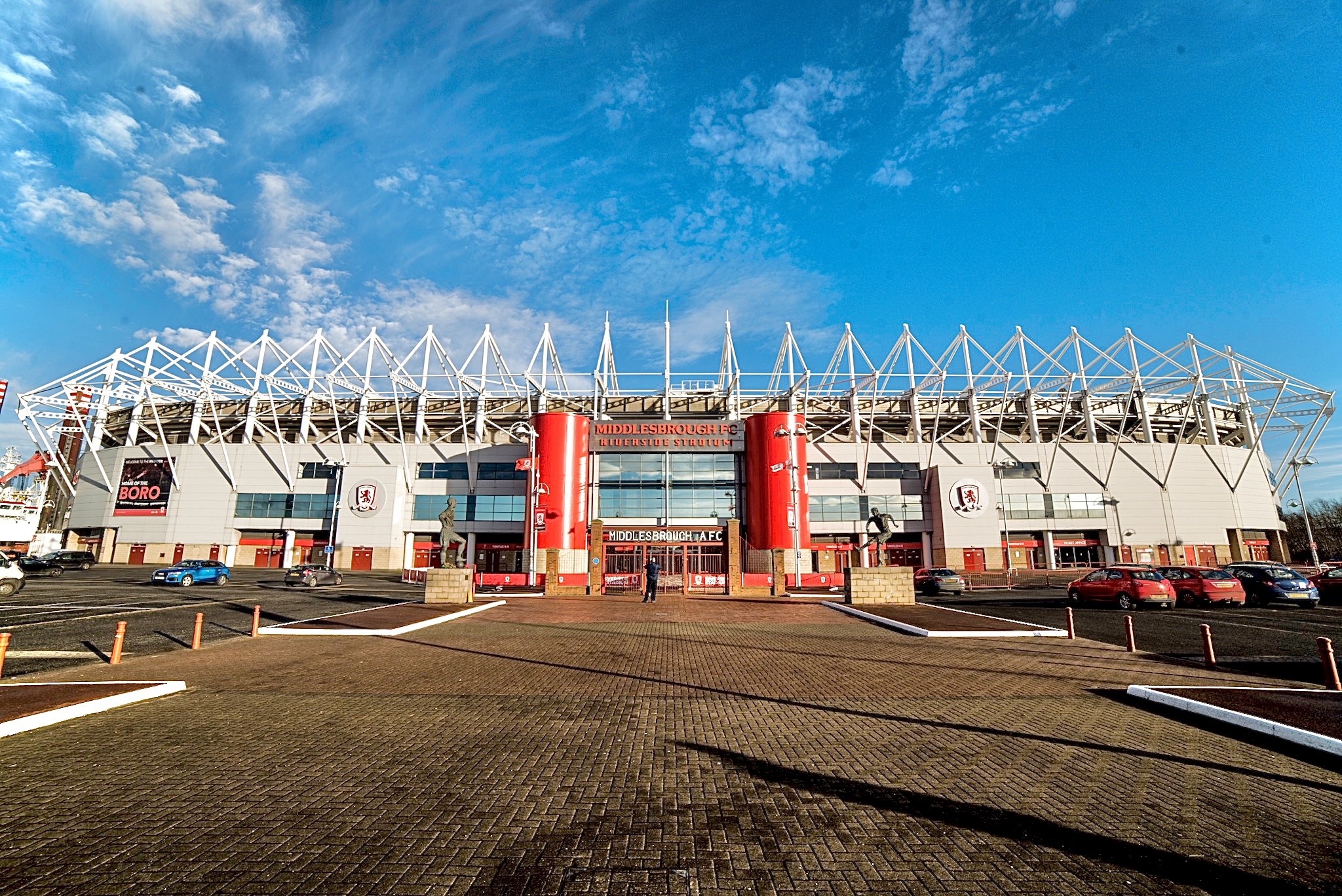
The Riverside Stadium

Middlesbrough FC is a Championship football team, owned by local haulage entrepreneur Steve Gibson. The 34,000 capacity Riverside Stadium is owned and host to home games by the club since 1995, when they left Ayresome Park. Founder members of the Premier League in 1992, Middlesbrough won the Football League Cup in 2004, and were beaten finalists in the 2005-06 UEFA Cup. In 1905, they made Britain's first £1,000 transfer when they signed Alf Common from local rivals Sunderland. Middlesbrough Ironopolis FC was briefly based in the town during the late 19th century; it later dissolved.

=== Rugby Union ===
Middlesbrough RUFC, founded in 1872 having have played their home games at Acklam Park since 1929, and Acklam RUFC are in Durham/ Northumberland Division One. Both are members of Yorkshire Rugby Football Union.

=== Racing ===
The town hosts multiple road races through the year, including the annual Middlesbrough 10k (formerly Tees Pride 10k) road race. First held in 2005, the one-lap circuit event and associated fun runs were held in the Acklam area of the town, before being moved to the town centre in 2021.

On 1 May 2016, Middlesbrough hosted the start of Stage 3 to the 2016 Tour de Yorkshire. The stage and race ended in Scarborough.

=== Other ===
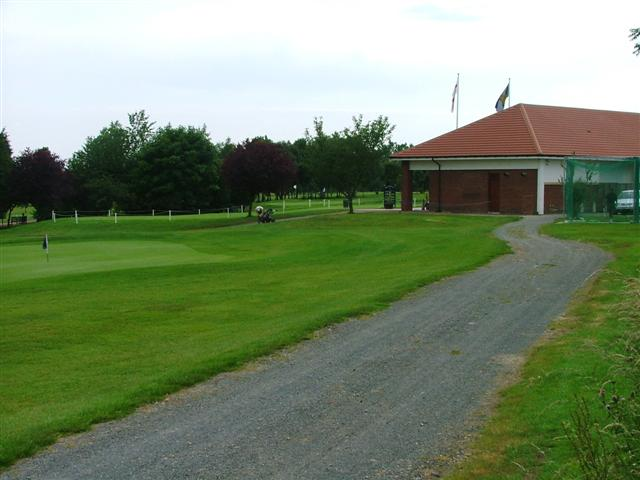
Middlesbrough Golf Club

Middlesbrough Cricket Club have played at Acklam Park since 1930 and play in North Yorkshire and South Durham Cricket League. Yorkshire have played 45 County Championship games in Middlesbrough; the most recent being in 1996.

Speedway racing was staged at Cleveland Park Stadium from 1928 until the 1990s, with the Middlesbrough Bears.

Athletics has two local clubs serving the area: Middlesbrough & Cleveland Harriers, and Middlesbrough AC (Mandale). Training facilities at the Middlesbrough Sports Village opened in 2015, replacing Clairville Stadium. Notable athletes to train at both facilities are World and European Indoor Sprint Champion Richard Kilty, British indoor long jump record holder Chris Tomlinson. The sports village includes a running track with grandstand, an indoor gym and café, football pitches, as well as a cycle circuit and velodrome.

Next to the sports village is a skateboard park and Middlesbrough Tennis World.

Tees Valley Mohawks and Teesside Lions basketball teams play in the NBL Division 3.

== Twinned towns ==
Middlesbrough is twinned with:

- Oberhausen, North Rhine-Westphalia, Germany. Middlesbrough and Oberhausen entered into a town twinning partnership in 1974, with close ties having existed for over 50 years. Those ties began in 1953 with youth exchanges, the first of which was held in 1953. Both towns continue to be committed to twinning activities today.
- Dunkirk, Nord, Hauts-de-France, France Although Middlesbrough is also officially twinned with the town, twinning events have ceased.
- Masvingo, Masvingo District, Masvingo Province, Zimbabwe, since 1989

== See also ==
- Demographics of Tees Valley
