= Middlesbrough Council elections =

Local government elections for Middlesbrough, England

Middlesbrough Council is a unitary authority in North Yorkshire, England. Until 1 April 1996 it was a non-metropolitan district in Cleveland. Since 2002 it has also had a directly elected mayor.

== Council elections ==
=== Non-metropolitan district elections ===
- 1973 Middlesbrough Borough Council election
- 1976 Middlesbrough Borough Council election
- 1979 Middlesbrough Borough Council election (New ward boundaries)
- 1983 Middlesbrough Borough Council election
- 1987 Middlesbrough Borough Council election
- 1991 Middlesbrough Borough Council election

=== Unitary authority elections ===
- 1995 Middlesbrough Borough Council election
- 1999 Middlesbrough Borough Council election
- 2003 Middlesbrough Borough Council election (New ward boundaries)
- 2007 Middlesbrough Borough Council election
- 2011 Middlesbrough Borough Council election
- 2015 Middlesbrough Borough Council election (New ward boundaries)
- 2019 Middlesbrough Council election
- 2023 Middlesbrough Council election

== Results maps ==
2003 results map

2007 results map

2011 results map

2015 results map

2019 results map

2023 results map

== Mayoral elections ==
- Middlesbrough mayoral election, 2002
- Middlesbrough mayoral election, 2007
- Middlesbrough mayoral election, 2011
- Middlesbrough mayoral election, 2015

== By-election results ==
=== 1995–1999 ===
Hemlington By-Election 11 September 1997
Party	Candidate	Votes	%	±%
Labour	Malcolm Seysell	410	46.5	−37.9
Liberal Democrats	Victor Mayo	405	45.9	+45.9
Conservative	Janice Hooton	67	7.6	−8.1
Majority		5	0.6	
Turnout		882	25.0	
Labour hold		Swing		

North Ormesby By-Election 6 November 1997
Party	Candidate	Votes	%	±%
Labour	Eleanor Lancaster	528	68.8	+16.5
Conservative	Gareth Dadd	177	23.0	+17.7
Liberal Democrats	Alison Dadd	63	8.2	+8.2
Majority		351	45.8	
Turnout		768	21.0	
Labour hold		Swing		

Southfield By-Election 20 November 1997
Party	Candidate	Votes	%	±%
Labour	Colin Snowdon	290	75.5	−8.3
Conservative	Betty Cook	53	13.8	−2.4
Liberal Democrats	Tony Scurrah	41	10.6	+10.6
Majority		237	61.7	
Turnout		384	10.6	
Labour hold		Swing		

=== 1999–2003 ===
Marton By-Election 29 June 2000
Party	Candidate	Votes	%	±%
Liberal Democrats	Dorothy Davison	743	56.0	+9.4
Conservative	Peter Sanderson	354	26.7	+7.2
Labour	Janice Brunton	229	17.3	−16.6
Majority		389	29.3	
Turnout		1,326	35.7	
Liberal Democrats hold		Swing		

=== 2003–2007 ===
Middlehaven By-Election 16 March 2006
Party	Candidate	Votes	%	±%
Labour	Mohammed Khan	283	54.7	+7.7
Independent	Catherine Rozevskis	127	24.6	+24.6
Conservative	Sajaad Khan	58	11.2	−4.0
Liberal Democrats	Christopher McIntyre	49	9.5	−8.1
Majority		156	30.1	
Turnout		517	17.9	
Labour hold		Swing		

=== 2007–2011 ===
Gresham By-Election 13 March 2008
Party	Candidate	Votes	%	±%
Labour	Susan Carter	584	47.9	−1.4
Independent	Peter Birt	377	31.0	+31.0
BNP	Barry Towers	135	11.1	+11.1
Liberal Democrats	Donald Theakston	78	6.4	+6.4
Conservative	Andrew Gilbey	44	3.6	+3.6
Majority		207	16.9	
Turnout		1,218	20.6	
Labour hold		Swing		

Marton West By-Election 13 March 2008
Party	Candidate	Votes	%	±%
Conservative	John Hobson	993	63.0	+13.5
Labour	David Branson	413	26.2	−4.5
BNP	Kevin Broughton	170	10.8	+10.8
Majority		580	36.8	
Turnout		1,576	39.2	
Conservative hold		Swing		

North Ormesby and Brambles Farm By-Election 28 May 2009
Party	Candidate	Votes	%	±%
Labour	Len Junier	549	60.0	−7.0
BNP	Michael Trainor	175	19.0	+19.0
Conservative	David Crosby	131	14.0	−7.0
Liberal Democrats	John Heath	63	7.0	+7.0
Majority		374	41.0	
Turnout		918	21.1	
Labour hold		Swing		

Ayresome By-Election 9 September 2010
Party	Candidate	Votes	%	±%
Independent	Bill Hawthorne	456	48.4	+6.1
Labour	Steve Cass	414	43.9	+1.3
Conservative	James Ruddock	73	7.7	−7.4
Majority		42	4.5	
Turnout		943	20.8	
Independent gain from Labour		Swing		

=== 2011–2015 ===
North Ormesby and Brambles Farm By-Election 27 September 2012
Party	Candidate	Votes	%	±%
Labour	Derek Loughborough	471	67.8	−14.8
Liberal Democrats	Martin Brown	109	15.7	+15.7
Independent	Stephen Riley	71	10.2	+10.2
Conservative	Valerie Beadnall	38	5.5	−11.9
Independent	Daud Bashir	6	0.9	+0.9
Majority		362	52.1	
Turnout		695	15.5	
Labour hold		Swing		

Pallister By-Election 2 May 2013
Party	Candidate	Votes	%	±%
Labour	Mick Thompson	608	65.7	+11.9
UKIP	David Cottrell	262	28.3	+28.3
Conservative	Zoe Greaves	29	3.1	−4.4
Liberal Democrats	Gary McArthur	27	2.9	+2.9
Majority		346	37.4	
Turnout		926	21.3	
Labour hold		Swing		

=== 2015–2019 ===
Coulby Newham By-Election 5 May 2016
Party	Candidate	Votes	%	±%
Labour	David Branson	732	45.6	+7.8
Independent	Alison Huggan	475	29.6	+6.5
Conservative	Lewis Melvin	352	21.9	−3.8
Liberal Democrats	Ian Jones	48	3.0	−10.5
Majority		257	16.0	
Turnout		1,607	25.1	
Labour hold		Swing		

Central By-Election 20 October 2016
Party	Candidate	Votes	%	±%
Labour	Matthew Storey	760	73.6	+37.7
Independent	Dale Clark	149	14.4	N/A
Conservative	Ron Armstrong	70	6.8	N/A
Liberal Democrats	Elliott Sabin-Motson	53	5.1	N/A
Majority		611	59.2	
Turnout		1,032	18.61	
Labour hold		Swing		

The by-election was caused by the resignation of Councillor Ansab Shan, a member of the Labour Party, to accept an appointment with the Crown Prosecution Service

Coulby Newham by-election 13 April 2017
Party	Candidate	Votes	%	±%
Conservative	Jacob Young	501	38.0	+8.3
Labour	Annalise Higgins	468	35.5	−8.2
Independent	Mike Allen	318	24.1	−2.5
Green	Emma Alberti	32	2.4	N/A
Majority		33	2.5	
Turnout		1,319	20.5	
Conservative gain from Labour		Swing		

The by-election was caused by the resignation of Councillor John Cole, Labour's chair of Middlesbrough Council's planning committee. He did not give a reason. In 2012 his car had been subject to an arson attack, which also involved another councillor's car.

Ayresome By-Election 13 July 2017
Party	Candidate	Votes	%	±%
Labour	Vic Walkington	414	59.7	
Conservative	Jill Coleman	252	36.3	
Liberal Democrats	Rhid Nugent	15	2.2	
Green	Carl Martinez	13	1.9	
Majority		162	23.3	
Turnout		694	16.6	
Labour hold		Swing		

The by-election was caused by the death of Councillor Bernie Taylor.

Park End and Beckfield By-Election 13 July 2017
Party	Candidate	Votes	%	±%
Independent	Jan Mohan	505	56.9	
Labour	Ian Blades	302	34.0	
Conservative	Ron Armstrong	59	6.6	
Green	Jamie Rawlings	12	1.4	
Liberal Democrats	Wen Cai Bowman	10	1.1	
Majority		203	22.9	
Turnout		888	15.0	
Independent hold		Swing		

The by-election was caused by the death of Councillor Peter Cox.

Brambles and Thorntree By-Election 13 December 2018
Party	Candidate	Votes	%	±%
Labour	Janet Thompson	321	58.4	
Independent	Graham Wilson	158	28.7	
Conservative	David Smith	44	8.0	
Liberal Democrats	Paul Michael Hamilton	27	4.9	
Majority		163	29.6	
Turnout		550	9.8	
Labour hold		Swing		

The by-election was caused by the death of Councillor Peter Purvis.

=== 2019–2023 ===
Park End and Beckfield By-Election 4 July 2019
Party	Candidate	Votes	%	±%
Independent	Stephen Hill	511	53.0	
Independent	Steven James	303	31.4	
Labour	Paul McGrath	115	11.9	
Conservative	Val Beadnall	23	2.4	
Liberal Democrats	Ian Jones	13	1.3	
Majority		208	21.6	
Turnout		965	17.0	
Independent hold		Swing		

The by-election was caused by the resignation of Councillor Jan Mohan, citing health reasons.

Coulby Newham By-Election 20 February 2020
Party	Candidate	Votes	%	±%
Conservative	Luke Mason	689	49.0	
Labour	Alex Law	279	19.9	
Liberal Democrats	Tom Carney	259	18.4	
Independent	Ellie Lowther	90	6.4	
Independent	Ian Morrish	88	6.3	
Majority		410	29.2	
Turnout		1,405	21.6	
Conservative hold		Swing		

The by-election was caused by the resignation of Councillor David Smith.

Ladgate By-Election 16 September 2021
Party	Candidate	Votes	%	±%
Independent	Tony Grainge	362	34.8	+34.8
Conservative	Lee Robert Holmes	315	30.3	−9.2
Labour	Mick Thompson	226	21.7	−38.8
Independent	Sharon Platt	121	11.6	+11.6
Liberal Democrats	Paul Hamilton	14	1.3	+1.3
Independent	Vic Hoban	3	0.3	+0.3
Majority		47	4.5	
Turnout		1,041		
Independent gain from Labour		Swing		

The by-election was caused by the death of Councillor June Goodchild.

North Ormesby By-Election 16 December 2021
Party	Candidate	Votes	%	±%
Labour	Nicky Gascoigne	172	74.5	+47.7
Independent	Mark Horkan	32	13.9	+13.9
Conservative	Val Beadnall	20	8.7	+5.5
Liberal Democrats	Ian Jones	7	3.0	+3.0
Majority		140	60.6	
Turnout		231		
Labour gain from Independent		Swing		

The by-election was caused by the resignation of Councillor Ashley Waters.

Berwick Hills and Pallister By-Election 30 June 2022
Party	Candidate	Votes	%	±%
Labour	Ian Blades	361	56.8	+26.5
Independent	Steven James	204	32.1	+32.1
Conservative	John Cooper	53	8.3	+2.8
Liberal Democrats	Sophie Drumm	11	1.7	+1.7
Green	Annette Fermin	7	1.1	+1.1
Majority		157	24.7	
Turnout		636		
Labour gain from Independent		Swing		

The by-election was caused by the resignation of Councillor Lee Garvey.

=== 2023–2027 ===
Ayresome By-Election 17 August 2023
Party	Candidate	Votes	%	±%
Independent	Jackie Young	318	36.1	
Labour	Mick Thompson	294	33.4	
Liberal Democrats	Claire Brent	201	22.8	
Green	Matthew Harris	32	3.6	
Conservative	Sajid Hussain	30	3.4	
Independent	Jon Rathmell	5	0.6	
Majority		24	2.7	
Turnout		880		
Independent gain from Labour		Swing		

The by-election was caused by the resignation of Councillor Antony High.

Acklam By-Election 4 July 2024
Party	Candidate	Votes	%	±%
Labour	Luke Henman	1,067	38.9	
Liberal Democrats	Mark Brown	850	31.0	
Independent	Jules Nicholson	466	17.0	
Conservative	Eric Phillips	361	13.2	
Majority		217	7.9	
Turnout		2,744		
Labour hold		Swing		

The by-election was caused by the resignation of Councillor Sheila Dean.

Central By-Election 4 July 2024
Party	Candidate	Votes	%	±%
Labour	Lewis Young	1,644	60.5	
Conservative	Sajid Hussain	491	18.1	
Independent	Keith Young	366	13.5	
Liberal Democrats	Ian Jones	216	7.9	
Majority		1,153	42.4	
Turnout		2,717		
Labour hold		Swing		

The by-election was caused by the resignation of Councillor Matt Storey.

=== Hemlington ===
Hemlington: 24 October 2024
Party	Candidate	Votes	%	±%
Labour	Thomas Mohan	422	53.1	−2.2
Conservative	Lewis Melvin	251	31.6	+17.9
Independent	Barrie Cooper	55	6.9	N/A
Workers Party	Mehmoona Ameen	47	5.9	N/A
Liberal Democrats	Christopher Henderson	20	2.5	N/A
Majority		171	21.5	−21.6
Turnout		795	18.91	−12.5
Registered electors		4,220		
Labour hold				

Nunthorpe By-Election 4 December 2025
Party	Candidate	Votes	%	±%
Reform	Joanne Rush	563	35.8	
Liberal Democrats	Adrian Walker	550	35.0	
Conservative	Martin Lyon	328	20.9	
Green	Sam Boardman	79	5.0	
Labour	Richard Lewis	52	3.3	
Majority		13	0.8	
Turnout		1,572		
Reform gain from Liberal Democrats		Swing		

The by-election was caused by the resignation of Councillor Morgan McClintock.
