= 2015 Middlesbrough Borough Council election =

2015 UK local government election

Results of the 2015 Middlesbrough Council election

The 2015 Middlesbrough Borough Council election took place on 7 May 2015 to elect members of Middlesbrough Borough Council in England. It took place on the same day as the election for the Mayor of Middlesbrough, as well as the UK general election, and other local elections across England. Since the 2011 election, there had been boundary reviews, which resulted in two fewer seats on the council, many old wards being discontinued and new wards being formed.

== Overall results ==
There are two fewer seats on the council as a result of a boundary review.

Middlesbrough Borough Council Election Result 2015
| Party | Seats | Gains | Losses | Net gain/loss | Seats % | Votes % | Votes | +/− |
|---|---|---|---|---|---|---|---|---|
| Labour | 33 | | | +3 | 71.74 | 49.51 | 44,114 | |
| Independent | 9 | | | -1 | 19.56 | 23.16 | 20,631 | |
| Conservative | 4 | | | 0 | 8.70 | 16.89 | 15,045 | |
| UKIP | 0 | | | | 0 | 6.86 | 6,111 | |
| Green | 0 | | | -1 | 0 | 2,218 | 969 | |
| Liberal Democrats | 0 | | | -1 | 0 | 1.09 | 969 | |

A total of 89,088 valid votes were cast and there were 645 rejected ballots.
The turnout was 55.62%.

== Council Composition ==
Prior to the election the composition of the council was:

↓
| 25 | 15 | 4 | 2 | 1 | 1 |
| Labour | Independent | Con | MI | L | G |

After the election the composition of the council was:

↓
| 33 | 9 | 4 |
| Labour | Independent | Con |

Con
MI - Marton Independents
L - Liberal Democrats
G - Green Party

== Ward results ==
An asterisk denotes an incumbent councillor.

=== Acklam ===
Acklam (2 Seats)
| Party | Candidate | Votes | % | ±% |
|---|---|---|---|---|
| Labour | Shelia Dean | 1,260 | 30.71 | N/A |
| Labour | Shyamal Biswas* | 1,017 | 24.79 | −3.16 |
| Conservative | Ken Hall | 971 | 23.67 | +4.29 |
| Independent | Victor Paul Walkington | 527 | 12.84 | N/A |
| Conservative | Mohammed Aslam Hanif | 328 | 7.99 | N/A |
| Majority | | 46 | 1.12 | |
| Turnout | | 4,103 | 63.7 | +16.73 |
| Labour gain from Independent | | Swing | | |
| Labour hold | | Swing | | |

=== Ayresome ===
Ayresome (2 Seats)
| Party | Candidate | Votes | % | ±% |
|---|---|---|---|---|
| Labour | Bernard Edward Taylor* | 996 | 31.94 | +4.04 |
| Labour | Denise Rooney | 751 | 24.09 | +0.50 |
| UKIP | Martin Neil | 452 | 14.50 | N/A |
| Independent | William Henry Hawthorne | 435 | 13.95 | −9.88 |
| Conservative | Eric Lawrence | 282 | 9.04 | +5.10 |
| Independent | Brian Robert Taylor | 202 | 6.48 | N/A |
| Majority | | 299 | 9.59 | |
| Turnout | | 3,118 | 53.38 | +20.42 |
| Labour gain from Independent | | Swing | | |
| Labour hold | | Swing | | |

=== Berwick Hills and Pallister ===
This is a newly created ward, therefore there are no previous figures to compare the 2015 result to.

Berwick Hills and Pallister (3 Seats)
| Party | Candidate | Votes | % | ±% |
|---|---|---|---|---|
| Labour | Mick Thompson | 1,221 | 29.56 | |
| Labour | Eddie Dryden* | 1,152 | 27.89 | |
| Labour | Julie McGee | 841 | 20.36 | |
| Independent | Derek Loughborough | 700 | 16.94 | |
| Conservative | Doris Lawrence | 217 | 5.25 | |
| Majority | | 311 | 7.53 | |
| Turnout | | 4,131 | | |
| Labour hold | | Swing | | |
| Labour hold | | Swing | | |
| Labour hold | | Swing | | |

Dryden previously served as a councillor for the Pallister ward from 2011-2015.

=== Brambles and Thorntree ===
Brambles and Thorntree (3 Seats)
| Party | Candidate | Votes | % | ±% |
|---|---|---|---|---|
| Labour | Geraldine Purvis | 1,006 | 21.29 | |
| Labour | Thurston Peter Purvis | 1,004 | 21.24 | |
| Labour | Terence Henry Lawton | 921 | 19.49 | |
| Independent | Len Junier | 480 | 10.16 | |
| UKIP | Anthony Birtle | 475 | 10.05 | |
| Independent | Angela Marie Brodie | 342 | 7.23 | |
| Independent | John Knowles | 327 | 6.92 | |
| Conservative | David Smith | 171 | 3.62 | |
| Majority | | 441 | 9.33 | |
| Turnout | | 4,726 | 36.87 | |
| Labour hold | | Swing | | |
| Labour hold | | Swing | | |
| Labour hold | | Swing | | |

This is a newly created ward, therefore there are no previous figures to compare the 2015 result to.
Cllrs G Purvis and T Purvis were both previously councillors for the Thorntree ward.
Len Junier was previously the Labour cllr for North Ormesby & Brambles Farm.

=== Central ===
Central (3 Seats)
| Party | Candidate | Votes | % | ±% |
|---|---|---|---|---|
| Labour | Linda Lewis | 1,387 | 24.08 | |
| Labour | Ansab Ali Shan | 946 | 16.49 | |
| Labour | Mirja Mohammed Zafar Uddin | 944 | 16.45 | |
| Independent | John McPartland | 713 | 12.43 | |
| Independent | Mohammed Pervaz Khan | 680 | 11.85 | |
| Independent | Zafiar Khan | 678 | 11.82 | |
| UKIP | Alan Wedlake | 395 | 6.88 | |
| Majority | | 231 | 4.02 | |
| Turnout | | 5,738 | 43.45 | |
| Labour hold | | Swing | | |
| Labour hold | | Swing | | |
| Labour hold | | Swing | | |

=== Coulby Newham ===
Coulby Newham (3 Seats)
| Party | Candidate | Votes | % | ±% |
|---|---|---|---|---|
| Labour | John Geoffrey Cole* | 1,464 | 18.85 | |
| Labour | Janice Brunton* | 1,291 | 16.62 | |
| Labour | Joe William Culley | 1,079 | 13.89 | |
| Conservative | Leslie Charles Myers | 996 | 12.82 | |
| Independent | Michael Hudson* | 893 | 11.50 | |
| Independent | Alison Mary Huggan | 762 | 9.81 | |
| Independent | Steven Antony Maynard | 758 | 9.76 | |
| Liberal Democrats | Ben Gibson | 524 | 6.75 | |
| Majority | | 83 | 1.07 | |
| Turnout | | 7,767 | 52.87 | |
| Labour gain from Independent | | Swing | | |
| Labour hold | | Swing | | |
| Labour hold | | Swing | | |

=== Hemlington ===
Hemlington (2 Seats)
| Party | Candidate | Votes | % | ±% |
|---|---|---|---|---|
| Labour | Jeanette Ann Walker* | 1,474 | 36.26 | −10.14 |
| Labour | Nicola Joy Walker* | 1,377 | 33.87 | −10.73 |
| UKIP | David Crosby | 489 | 12.03 | N/A |
| Independent | Ian Steven Hamilton | 378 | 9.30 | N/A |
| Conservative | George Gunn Beasley | 347 | 8.54 | −0.46 |
| Majority | | 888 | 21.84 | |
| Turnout | | 4,065 | 54.00 | +18.47 |
| Labour hold | | Swing | | |
| Labour hold | | Swing | | |

=== Kader ===
Kader (2 Seats)
| Party | Candidate | Votes | % | ±% |
|---|---|---|---|---|
| Conservative | Ronald Arundale* | 1,165 | 25.03 | −1.01 |
| Labour | Jordan Peter Blyth | 896 | 19.25 | +4.30 |
| Labour | Jennifer Susan Dowsett | 835 | 17.94 | +1.34 |
| Conservative | Ronald Darby | 826 | 17.75 | −13.38 |
| UKIP | David Cottrell | 556 | 11.95 | N/A |
| UKIP | John Andrew Christopher Hogg | 376 | 8.08 | N/A |
| Majority | | 61 | 1.31 | |
| Turnout | | 4,654 | 65.29 | +15.47 |
| Labour gain from Conservative | | Swing | | |
| Conservative hold | | Swing | | |

=== Ladgate ===
Ladgate (2 Seats)
| Party | Candidate | Votes | % | ±% |
|---|---|---|---|---|
| Labour | Michael Carr* | 1,070 | 31.86 | −5.32 |
| Labour | June Goodchild | 976 | 28.17 | −8.34 |
| Conservative | Ron W Armstrong | 516 | 15.37 | N/A |
| UKIP | Janis William-Landess | 427 | 12.72 | N/A |
| Conservative | Sam Edwards Griffiths | 399 | 11.88 | N/A |
| Majority | | 430 | 12.80 | |
| Turnout | | 3,358 | 54.82 | +17.98 |
| Labour hold | | Swing | | |
| Labour hold | | Swing | | |

=== Linthorpe ===
Linthorpe (2 Seats)
| Party | Candidate | Votes | % | ±% |
|---|---|---|---|---|
| Labour | Steve Edward Bloundele* | 1,467 | 35.26 | |
| Labour | Naweed Hussain | 1,014 | 24.38 | |
| Conservative | Thomas Wilkinson | 761 | 18.29 | |
| Green | Darren Robert Moore | 473 | 11.37 | |
| Liberal Democrats | Ian Godfrey Llewellyn Jones | 445 | 10.70 | |
| Majority | | 253 | 6.09 | |
| Turnout | | 4,160 | 63.38 | |
| Labour hold | | Swing | | |
| Labour hold | | Swing | | |

This ward has changed from having 3 seats to 2 seats as a result of recent boundary changes, therefore there are no previous figures to compare the 2015 result to.

=== Longlands and Beechwood ===
Longlands and Beechwood (3 Seats)
| Party | Candidate | Votes | % | ±% |
|---|---|---|---|---|
| Labour | Teresa Higgins | 1,372 | 23.47 | |
| Independent | Joan McTigue* | 1,110 | 18.98 | |
| Labour | Charles Michael Rooney* | 1,046 | 17.89 | |
| Labour | Jacinta Catherine Skipp | 884 | 15.12 | |
| UKIP | Nigel Patrick Connor | 752 | 12.86 | |
| Independent | Edward Brian Rooney | 411 | 7.03 | |
| Conservative | Timothy Edward Goodrick | 272 | 4.65 | |
| Majority | | 162 | 2.77 | |
| Turnout | | 5,847 | 47.11 | |
| Labour hold | | Swing | | |
| Independent hold | | Swing | | |
| Labour hold | | Swing | | |

This is a newly created ward, therefore there are no previous figures to compare the 2015 result to.

Cllrs McTigue and Rooney previously served as councillors from 2011-2015 in the Beachwood and Clairville wards respectively.

=== Marton East ===
Marton East (2 Seats)
| Party | Candidate | Votes | % | ±% |
|---|---|---|---|---|
| Independent | Thomas William Mawston* | 1,212 | 28.74 | |
| Independent | Dorothy Davison* | 1,165 | 27.62 | |
| Labour | John Baptist Kabuye | 693 | 16.43 | |
| Conservative | Archibald Stephenson Currie | 675 | 16.00 | |
| UKIP | Stephen John Arthur Burrows | 473 | 11.21 | |
| Majority | | 472 | 11.19 | |
| Turnout | | 4,218 | 66.67 | |
| Independent hold | | Swing | | |
| Independent hold | | Swing | | |

This is a newly created ward, therefore there are no previous figures to compare the 2015 result to.

Both Cllrs Mawston and Davison were previously councillors for Marton Ward from 2011-2015.

=== Marton West ===
Marton West (2 Seats)
| Party | Candidate | Votes | % | ±% |
|---|---|---|---|---|
| Conservative | Christine Hobson* | 1,661 | 34.14 | |
| Conservative | John Eric Hobson | 1,557 | 32.00 | |
| Labour | David John Branson | 816 | 16.77 | |
| Labour | Stephen Cass | 443 | 9.11 | |
| UKIP | Terry O'Brien | 388 | 7.98 | |
| Majority | | 741 | 15.23 | |
| Turnout | | 4,865 | 67.79 | |
| Conservative hold | | Swing | | |
| Conservative hold | | Swing | | |

=== Newport ===
Newport (3 Seats)
| Party | Candidate | Votes | % | ±% |
|---|---|---|---|---|
| Labour | Robert Brady* | 1,325 | 26.11 | |
| Labour | Tracy Harvey* | 1,108 | 21.84 | |
| Labour | Alma Hellaoui | 918 | 18.09 | |
| Independent | Sajaad Khan* | 607 | 11.96 | |
| UKIP | Darren Thomas Hogg | 601 | 11.85 | |
| Independent | Pauline Hawthorne | 515 | 10.15 | |
| Majority | | 311 | 6.13 | |
| Turnout | | 5,074 | 42.23 | |
| Labour hold | | Swing | | |
| Labour hold | | Swing | | |
| Labour hold | | Swing | | |

This is a newly created ward, therefore there are no previous figures to compare the 2015 result to.

Cllrs Brady and Harvey previously served as councillors for the Gresham ward from 2011-2015.

Sajaad Khan previously served as a Labour councillor in the Gresham ward from 2011-2015.

=== North Ormesby ===
North Ormesby
| Party | Candidate | Votes | % | ±% |
|---|---|---|---|---|
| Labour | Lewis Young | 389 | 50.07 | |
| Independent | Peter David Hall | 314 | 40.41 | |
| Conservative | Mark Owen Warman | 74 | 9.52 | |
| Majority | | 75 | 9.66 | |
| Turnout | | 777 | 43.38 | |
| Labour hold | | Swing | | |

This is a newly created ward, therefore there are no previous figures to compare the 2015 result to.

=== Nunthorpe ===
Nunthorpe (2 Seats)
| Party | Candidate | Votes | % | ±% |
|---|---|---|---|---|
| Independent | Theresa Lesley McGloin | 1,216 | 29.00 | |
| Independent | Jon Rathmell | 918 | 21.89 | |
| Conservative | Andrew Gordon Simmonds | 817 | 19.49 | |
| Conservative | Jacqueline Anne Simmonds | 704 | 16.79 | |
| Labour | Dennis Burns | 538 | 12.83 | |
| Majority | | 101 | 2.40 | |
| Turnout | | 4,193 | 67.05 | |
| Independent hold | | Swing | | |
| Independent hold | | Swing | | |

=== Park ===
Park (3 Seats)
| Party | Candidate | Votes | % | ±% |
|---|---|---|---|---|
| Labour | Julia Rostron* | 1,669 | 21.71 | |
| Labour | Frances McIntyre* | 1,416 | 18.42 | |
| Labour | Margaret Walters | 1,234 | 16.06 | |
| Green | Joseph Michna* | 1,134 | 14.75 | |
| Independent | Barbara Jacqueline Elder | 1,011 | 13.15 | |
| Conservative | John Henzell Hemy | 612 | 7.96 | |
| Green | Martin Bulman | 611 | 7.95 | |
| Majority | | 100 | 1.31 | |
| Turnout | | 7,687 | 56.92 | |
| Labour hold | | Swing | | |
| Labour hold | | Swing | | |
| Labour hold | | Swing | | |

Cllr Rostron previously served as councillor for Linthorpe from 2011-2015.

=== Park End and Beckfield ===
Park End and Beckfield (3 Seats)
| Party | Candidate | Votes | % | ±% |
|---|---|---|---|---|
| Independent | Brian Anthony Hubbard* | 1,177 | 20.32 | |
| Independent | Michael Saunders* | 1,082 | 18.68 | |
| Independent | Peter Alexander Cox* | 1,043 | 18.00 | |
| Labour | Ian Daniel Blades | 989 | 17.07 | |
| Labour | Christopher Patrick McIntyre | 716 | 12.36 | |
| Labour | Janet Elizabeth Thompson | 608 | 10.50 | |
| Conservative | Janet Angela Hobson | 178 | 3.07 | |
| Majority | | 54 | 0.93 | |
| Turnout | | 5,793 | 44.81 | |
| Independent hold | | Swing | | |
| Independent hold | | Swing | | |
| Independent hold | | Swing | | |

Cllrs Hubbard and Cox previously served as councillors in Beckfield, whilst Cllr Saunders served as a councillor for Park End.

=== Stainton and Thornton ===
Stainton and Thornton
| Party | Candidate | Votes | % | ±% |
|---|---|---|---|---|
| Conservative | David Philip Coupe | 756 | 63.11 | |
| Labour | Philippa Nancy Storey | 442 | 36.89 | |
| Majority | | 314 | 26.2 | |
| Turnout | | 1,198 | 65.80 | |
| Conservative hold | | Swing | | |

This is a newly created ward, therefore there are no previous figures to compare the 2015 result to.

=== Trimdon ===
Trimdon (2 Seats)
| Party | Candidate | Votes | % | ±% |
|---|---|---|---|---|
| Labour | Jean Sharrocks* | 619 | 17.12 | |
| Independent | Dennis McCabe | 553 | 15.29 | |
| Labour | Peter Vincent Sharrocks* | 535 | 14.80 | |
| Conservative | Maria Cairns | 455 | 12.58 | |
| UKIP | George William Rogers | 442 | 12.22 | |
| Independent | Stephen Dee | 422 | 11.67 | |
| Conservative | Kelvin Mirfin | 305 | 8.44 | |
| UKIP | Jamie Webb | 285 | 7.88 | |
| Majority | | 18 | 0.49 | |
| Turnout | | 3,616 | 63.87 | |
| Labour hold | | Swing | | |
| Independent hold | | Swing | | |

This is a newly created ward, therefore there are no previous figures to compare the 2015 result to.

Cllr J Sharrocks previously served as a councillor for the Brookfield ward from 2011-2015.

Peter Sharrocks previously served as a councillor for the Brookfield ward from 2011-2015.
