= Sleepout =

Sleepout may refer to:

- CEO Sleepout UK, a charity that raises money to fight homelessness and poverty
- SleepOut.com, an e-commerce booking service
- Belvedere Sleep-Out, an annual charitable fundraising event at Belvedere College, Dublin, Ireland
- A tradition to ensure enrollment into desired classes at University of Chicago, Illinois, U.S.
- In Australia, a sleepout is an additional bedroom created by fully or partially enclosing a veranda, for example in Queenslanders
