= Dave Roberts (sports broadcaster) =

English TV broadcaster (born 1964)

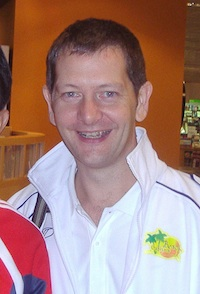
- Born: David Robert Roberts; 31 July 1964 (age 62); Middlesbrough, England
- Occupation: Sports commentator/broadcaster

Dave Roberts (full name David Robert Roberts; born 31 July 1964 in Middlesbrough, England) is a England-based former TV executive and ex-presenter and commentator specialising in association football. He previously worked for Fox Sports News and ESPN Star Sports in Singapore, ESPN in the US and Sky Sports in the UK as well as a host of English radio stations. As well as his broadcast work, he is a fully qualified International football referee. He owns and operates his own English based broadcast production company X-Cel Broadcast Limited. Roberts was also the BBC commentator on West Indian cricketer Brian Lara's world record breaking innings of 501 not out. He now provides coach travel for Middlesbrough's away matches.

== The early days ==
Born in Middlesbrough, England, Dave left school in 1980 to start as an electrician with ICI plc at its Wilton Works on Teesside.

In 1981 he started working at BBC Radio Cleveland, now BBC Radio Tees in Middlesbrough. Ahead of moving to Teesside's commercial station, Radio Tees, now TFM Radio. There he was a programme assistant for DJ Graham Robb on the late night phone-in show and played a character called 'The Priesfield Pest'.

The radio work progressed with on-air responsibilities; for the Saturday sports programme, and at BBC Radio Cleveland, where a mid morning programme he presented about living with HIV & AIDS was submitted for UK national broadcasting awards. He began freelancing for Capital Gold Radio in London providing reports and commentaries on football games as well as ITV Sport.

Roberts was also an electrician before moving into research within ICI's Research and Technology division as an Experimental Physicist – but left ICI in 1989 to focus on his broadcasting career.

== Radio career ==
=== Local radio ===
Roberts took up a broadcast journalist position with Radio Tees (renamed TFM) paired with his existing football commentary role covering Middlesbrough FC. This further expanded to presenting the Late Night Phone-In from 10 pm until 2 am. Roberts then left the newsroom to take on a role as Sponsorship & Promotions Manager for TFM's owners, Metro Radio Group, also retaining his late night presenters role.

In 1993 he rejoined the BBC to cover Durham County Cricket Club for both radio and TV. At the same time he presented both the Late Night Phone-In and the Late Night Love Affair for Hallam FM in Sheffield. It was during his BBC cricket reporting that he grabbed his personal place in sport's broadcasting history, commentating live on West Indian cricketer Brian Lara's world record innings of 501 not out. Roberts has stated he was only presented the chance of commentating fame due to an England v New Zealand test match taking place in Nottingham the same day resulting in him being the only TV or radio broadcaster at Edgbaston in Birmingham as the Warwickshire batsman took Durham apart. His moment 'in the spotlight' was heard on BBC Radios 1, 2, 4 and World Service as the runs mounted.

=== Century Radio ===
Roberts moved back to commercial radio to present the Big Mal Football Phone-In on Century with legendary coach Malcolm Allison. He also took on the role of Sports Editor once the station bought exclusive rights for Middlesbrough FC (Boro) commentaries. Roberts hired Boro commentator Alistair Brownlee from BBC Radio Cleveland. 'Roberts & Brownlee' became the staple diet for all Middlesbrough fans on a Saturday afternoon along with 'Big Mal'. He later presented Supermac at 6 a phone-in show with England and Newcastle United legend Malcolm Macdonald, as well as his regular commentaries and overseeing role for sport.

In 1997 Roberts shocked Boro fans by resigning after a postponed game at Stockport. It was later revealed in regional newspaper the Sunday Sun that he had been asked by senior management at the station to curb the on-air use of his insider knowledge of Boro.

=== Talk Radio ===
Six months later Roberts returned to the airwaves reporting and commentating for UK national radio station TalkRadio, now Talksport where he followed England national team games in the buildup to the France World Cup. Roberts became part of the TalkRadio France 98 World Cup team, working alongside his Sky Sports colleagues Alan Parry and Andy Gray. Gray mentions in his autobiography 'Gray Matters' how Roberts was charged with the task of overcoming strict accreditation criteria in France to enable the TalkRadio team to carry out their commentaries – as the station did not have the necessary credentials. Immediately after the France World Cup, and after 3 years freelancing for Sky Sports, Roberts joined Sky full-time establishing the North East Bureau for the soon-to-be-launched 24/7 sports news TV channel – SKY Sports News. He then became the sports face of the region as North East Reporter.

Despite his now full-time TV career, Roberts continued his association with TalkRadio for another 18 months – presenting regular programmes Weekend Sports Breakfast and Friday Football First as well as his reporting and commentaries. Roberts was last heard on TalkRadio as pitchside reporter at Wembley and Hampden Park for both legs of the England v Scotland Euro 2000 clashes.

== TV career ==
=== Early TV career ===
Roberts began 'freelancing' for several TV companies in the early 1990s as a sport reporter. He regularly appeared on ITV Sport providing live reports at football matches throughout England. Following the birth of the Premier League, he also conducted after-match interviews for BBC Match of the Day. But Roberts' TV career began in earnest when he joined BBC North to cover Durham County Cricket Club, where he became known as the commentator for Brian Lara's world record breaking cricket innings of 501 not out. He later joined GSKYB's channel UK Talk to present the daily sports show Sportstalk and Channel 5's Live and Dangerous. Roberts confided in colleagues that he was offered a presenter role for a new BBC TV show, Row Z, but was unable to accept due to his full-time commitments with SKY.

=== Sky Sports ===
Roberts had begun freelancing frequently with Sky Sports as a reporter, so it was no surprise that in August 1998, when Sky launched their 24/7 Sky Sports News channel, Roberts joined full-time. He established SKY's North East Bureau and operated as Bureau Chief and reporter and was seen on a daily basis reporting from the region's training grounds, press conferences and live at matches of English Premier League clubs.

=== ESPN Star Sports ===
In 2003, after 5 years full-time with Sky, Roberts left the UK to take up a Presenter/Commentator role with Singapore-based ESPN Star Sports. Here he anchored ESPN Star Sports UEFA Champions League output as well as English Premier League, Spain's La Liga programming, as well as the daily sports news show SportsCenter. Whilst with ESPN Star, Roberts covered Euro 2004 from Portugal, 2005 UEFA Champions League Final and World Cup Germany 2006 – anchoring and reporting ESS' output from site. One story he tells is of travelling to Damascus, Syria to cover AFC Cup Finals where he was arrested by Syrian secret police. This was not his only brush with trouble, in 2005 a Singapore newspaper claimed he was 'roughed up' by Thai Prime Minister's secret police at Government House after asking the then PM questions in a press conference on his attempt's to buy Liverpool FC. The report says he had been instructed not to ask questions after being identified as not one of the regular press corp members.

=== ESPN ===
After leaving South East Asia Roberts next appeared on ESPN as a Presenter/Commentator for ESPN International. He immediately began presenting the internationally networked football program ESPN Soccernet Press Pass as well as 2 new international SportsCenter programmes (Australia/Africa) Roberts became a regular face of the daily sports news shows, usually sitting alongside Georgie Bingham. It was not unusual to see Bingham in fits of tears at the end of the show after Roberts signed off with a witty one-liner. The same year Roberts was seen broadcasting from the West Indies at the Cricket World Cup.

In 2008 he was in Ghana covering the Africa Cup of Nations. In May that year he was pitchside reporter for ESPN in Moscow at the final of the Champions League between Manchester United and Chelsea. Something he repeated a year later in Rome in the Barcelona v Manchester United final, where after 6 minutes he reported that new technology on the final ball was resulting in goalkeepers having problems when it was in flight. Roberts was again reunited in the studio with his former Sky Sports colleague Andy Gray during ESPN USA's coverage of Euro 2008.

Roberts' employment with ESPN appeared to end after the 2010 FIFA World Cup in South Africa as he was next seen fronting the 2011 FA Cup Final, Community Shield and the Champions League Final (Barcelona 3–1 Manchester United) from London's Wembley Stadium for his former employer ESPN Star Sports – where he sat alongside the likes of former England manager Steve McClaren and pundit Gerry Armstrong. In 2011. This was the last time Roberts was seen on TV as he took up a role of Vice President of Fox's business development unit.

=== XCEL ===
Roberts now runs his own media production company XCel. XCel specialises in live TV and digital broadcasts, particularly in live motor racing from F1 circuits. He also owns Fan media operation RedArmy which includes the TV channel RedArmyTV and 24/7 radio station RedArmy Radio, operations that are staffed by Middlesbrough fan volunteers with Roberts providing technical infrastructure and professional development to enable volunteers to develop skills in order to enter the media job market or improve personal skills. RedArmyTV can be seen on Teesside TV as well as on digital platforms. RedArmy Radio can be heard online at http://streamingv2.shoutcast.com/redarmy-radio

== Refereeing ==
On air Roberts broadcast his passion for refereeing football, often giving unique insight into on-the-field situations through match official eyes. He was an FA referee when he left the UK for Asia. He regularly officiated in English competitions as – The FA Cup, Football Conference, FA Premier Reserve League, UniBond Northern Premier League, etc. In Singapore he refereed in the professional 'S-League' whilst regularly appearing on TV. Roberts appeared to perform very well and became popular with teams, players and coaches due to his approachable and open style of officiating. He was often seen sharing a joke with players and coaches during matches.

At the start of 2004 he was named, along with Singapore's FIFA referees, in the inaugural list of 'Elite Referees'. He regularly received FIFA training and coaching and began refereeing international teams and competitions. In 2005 he took charge of the Calcutta derby game between bitter rivals East Bengal and Mohun Bagan. Due to constant criticism of local referees in previous encounters the IFA had decided to search for a 'foreign' referee to officiate what is considered the largest derby game in world club football. The appointment made big headlines in the country as Roberts became the first foreign referee to officiate an all Indian domestic match. He was presented to the India media at a news conference the day before the game where he sent a message to the rival teams claiming "I guess the decibel level will be four times more than the matches I have deputed to date but I know I will have things under my control". The normal fiery affair passed with little incident with only 3 yellow cards shown and plaudits coming to Roberts from unexpected sources – "I am not supposed to comment but he was good", and, "He was always on the ball and is very fit. His communication with the players too is something we should learn. He was always in control and relaxed. Our referees should learn from the way he officiated the match.".

Roberts was again invited back to India to referee the semi-finals and final of the IFA Shield competition featuring Bayern Munich II. The competition was screened live on ESPN Star Sports and Roberts agreed to wear a microphone that the TV broadcaster could tune into to hear what was being said on the field. The facility was not used due after the experiment failed to receive the go-ahead by international football authorities.

Roberts' last game in Asia was the Malaysia FA Cup quarter final clash between Singapore Young Lions and Malaysia team Sarawak. The Young Lions won the match 7–2 in what seemed a relatively easy game to officiate. It was later alleged in the book The Fix by investigative reporter Declan Hill that the result of the game had been subject to irregular betting patterns, however, the allegations surrounded the players and not the match officials.

Roberts' refereeing in the USA was restricted due to residency criteria by United States Soccer Federation. It is a requirement with US Soccer that any official must hold citizenship or Permanent Residency to hold National Referee status and operate regularly in the country's professional competitions. Roberts therefore officiated in both State and NCAA College systems.

He is now a National Referee Instructor and assessor with England's FA. Previously, he was a Deputy Chairman of Football Association of Singapore's Referee Committee and a member of the Singapore government's Football Task Force. He led instructor courses in Philippines & in the UK where he now works closely with North Riding County FA coaching young up-and-coming match officials.

== Player management ==
Previously working at ESPN with Roberts was former New York Cosmos and USA national goalkeeper Shep Messing. Messing is the managing director of Pele's player representation agency Global Sport Group LLC. Based in Connecticut, USA – the agency has a long history of player management/representation and Roberts holds the position, managing director, Asia. Players that have been publicly linked to Roberts include, Australia international goalkeeper Mark Schwarzer, Turkey international striker Semih Senturk, Singapore captain Indra Sahdan Daud, Guinea striker Keita Mandjou, Thailand international midfielder Sutee Suksomkit and former Barcelona striker Santi Ezquerro.

== Running for Mayor of Middlesbrough ==
In May 2015, Roberts ran for Mayor of Middlesbrough, finishing third behind winner Dave Budd and second placed former hedge fund manager Andy Preston.
