= Dave Budd (politician) =

British politician

Mayor Dave Budd
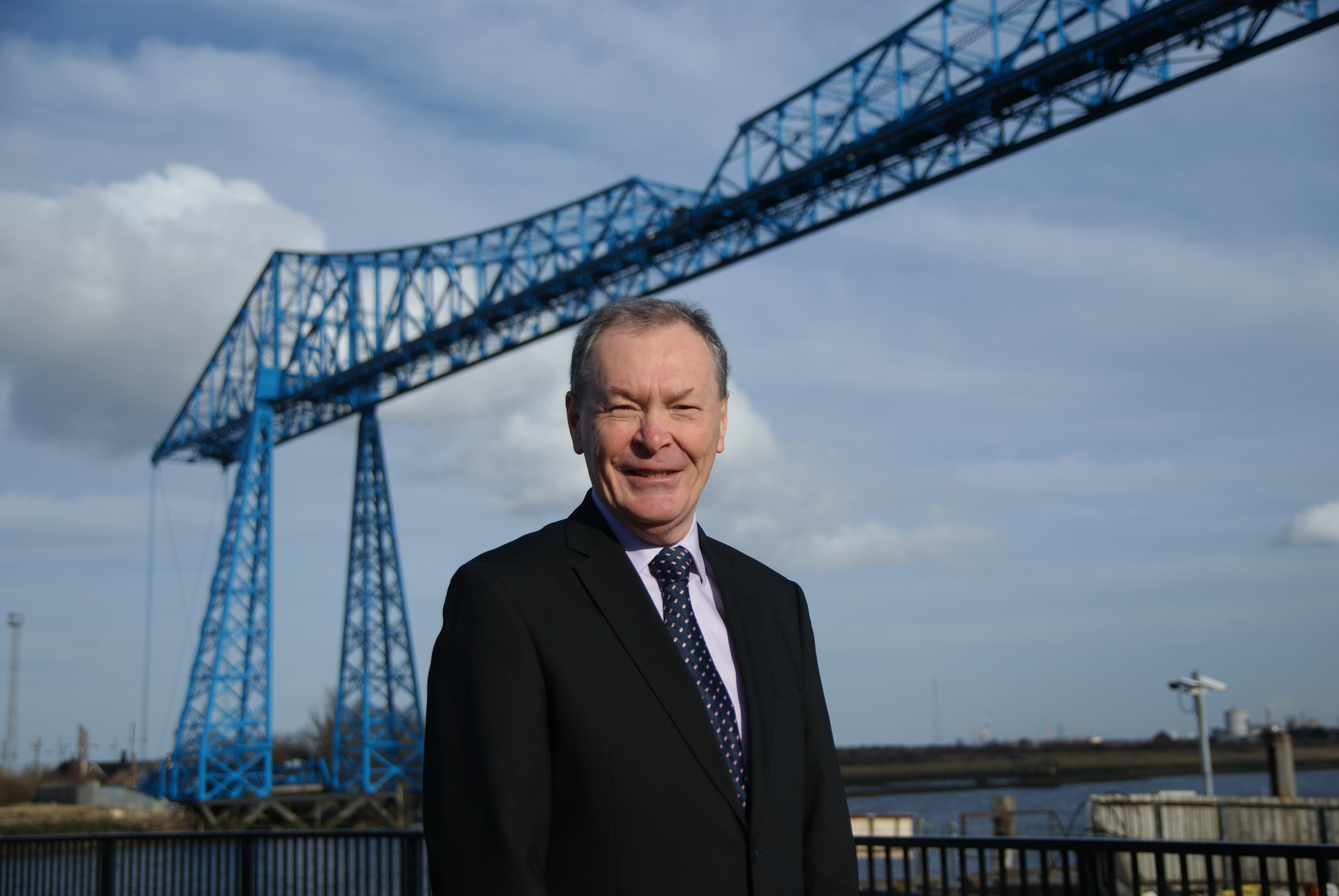

Mayor of Middlesbrough
- In office 11 May 2015 – 5 May 2019
- Deputy: Cllr Charlie Rooney
- Preceded by: Ray Mallon
- Succeeded by: Andy Preston

Deputy Mayor of Middlesbrough
- In office 6 May 2009 – 8 May 2015
- Preceded by: Cllr Bob Kerr
- Succeeded by: Cllr Charlie Rooney

Personal details
- Party: Labour

Christopher David Budd is a British politician. He served as the Mayor of Middlesbrough from 2015 until 2019. When elected, he became the second person to hold the post, having succeeded Ray Mallon.

== Middlesbrough Councillor ==
Dave Budd was first elected as a Borough Councillor on Middlesbrough Council in 1991, representing Stainton and Thornton ward. From 1999 until his election as Mayor, Dave Budd represented the Borough's Ladgate Ward. Upon the election of Ray Mallon as the first Directly-Elected Mayor in 2002, Budd was appointed to the Mayor's Executive as Executive Member for Economic Regeneration and Culture. In this role, Budd was responsible for the delivery of some of the most important changes to Middlesbrough's urban landscape in decades. The delivery of the Middlehaven project was begun at this time, and Budd oversaw the establishment of Mima and the creation of Centre Square.

Between 2007 and 2009, Budd was the Leader of the Council's Labour Group.

In 2009, Budd became Deputy Mayor under Ray Mallon, a position he held until his election as Mayor. From 2009, Budd also headed the Council's Finance portfolio.

== Mayoral Election ==
Budd was selected by Labour Party Members to fight the mayoral election in May 2014. Budd ran on a pledge to make a "fairer, safer and stronger Middlesbrough" and published a Manifesto detailing his policies.

Mayor Budd won the election by 252 votes, beating hedge fund millionaire and philanthropist Andy Preston into second place. Other candidates included former radio and television presenter Dave Roberts and two former Labour Councillors running as independents.

In 2018, Mayor Budd decided he would not bid to remain in office at the 2019 Local Elections. Mick Thompson being chosen to be his successor by the Labour Party however he was beaten by Andy Preston who took 58% (17,418 votes) of the vote in the first round to become the next Elected Mayor of Middlesbrough.

Middlesbrough Mayoral Election 7 May 2015
Party	Candidate	1st round		2nd round			1st round votesTransfer votes, 2nd round
Party	Candidate	Total	Of round	Transfers	Total	Of round	1st round votesTransfer votes, 2nd round
Labour	Dave Budd	16,680	33.8%	2,858	19,538		
Independent	Andrew Preston	14,265	28.9%	5,017	19,282		
Independent	David Roberts	5,803	11.8%				
Independent	Michael Carr	5,549	11.2%				
Conservative	Christopher Cole-Nolan	3,844	7.8%				
Independent	Len Junier	3,207	6.5%				
Turnout		49,348	96.0				
Rejected ballots		2,079	4.0				
Total votes		51,427	53.0				
Registered electors		97,089					
Labour gain from Independent							

As Elected Mayor of Middlesbrough, Budd spearheaded Middlesbrough's Investment Prospectus along with Interim Chief Executive Tony Parkinson - ambitious plans to drive forward the town's economic resurgence through investments totalling almost £700 million.

== Personal life ==
Dave Budd lives in the Marton area of Middlesbrough. He was raised in the town and worked in Middlesbrough throughout his working life. Prior to entering politics, Mayor Budd worked as a local bank manager for many years, helping and supporting local businesses to start up and to grow. Budd is an ardent Middlesbrough FC supporter and enjoys cricket.

Political offices
Preceded by Bob Kerr	Deputy Mayor of Middlesbrough; 2009-2015	Succeeded by Charlie Rooney
Preceded by Ray Mallon	Mayor of Middlesbrough; 2015-2019	Succeeded by Andy Preston
