= Jamia Masjid Al-Madina, Middlesbrough =

Mosque in Middlesbrough, England

Coordinates: 54.5683°N 1.2311°W

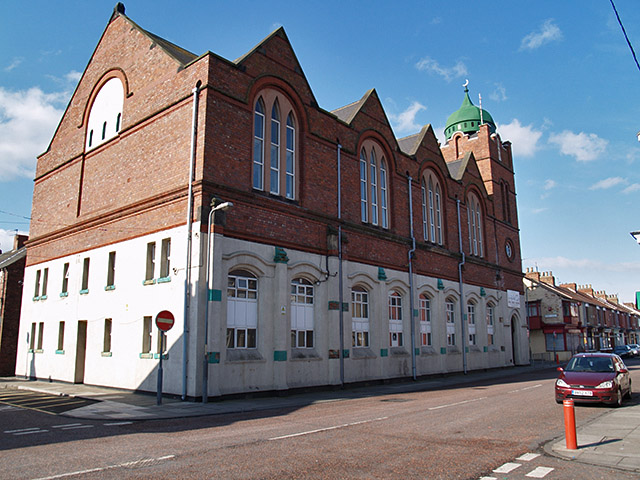
The Jamia Masjid Al-Madina mosque in 2008

The Jamia Masjid Al-Madina is a mosque on Waterloo Road in Middlesbrough.

The building was originally built as the Saint Michael and All Angels church of the Church of England in 1900. The church was converted into a mosque and community centre in the 1970s by people from the Pakistani community.

In 2010 the mosque was one of 79 buildings that were included on a 'Local List' by Middlesbrough Council, deemed to be of local historical or architectural importance.

In August 2024 the mosque was protected by a group of 300 people with surrounding streets blocked by police during the 2024 United Kingdom riots.
