= 2023 Middlesbrough Council election =

2023 English local election

- 4 May 2023

All 46 seats to Middlesbrough Council plus Mayor 24 seats needed for a majority
- Turnout: 27.8%

	First party	Second party
Leader	Matt Storey
Party	Labour	Independent
Last election	34.9%, 20 seats	43.7%, 23 seats
Seats before	21	22 (Note: Of the 22 independent councillors prior to the election, 10 formed the "Middlesbrough Independent Councillors Association" led by Mick Saunders, 9 formed the "Middlesbrough Independent Group" led by Chris Hobson, and the other 3 were not aligned to any group.)
Seats won	25	15
Seat change	▲5	▼8
Popular vote	25,504	16,481
Percentage	46.5%	30.1%
Swing	▲11.6%	▼13.8%
	Third party	Fourth party
Leader	David Coupe	Tom Livingstone
Party	Conservative	Liberal Democrats
Last election	11.9%, 3 seats	3.3%, 0 seats
Seats before	3	0
Seats won	4	2
Seat change	▲1	▲2
Popular vote	8,044	3,910
Percentage	14.7%	7.1%
Swing	▲2.8%	▲3.8%
- Winner of each seat at the 2023 Middlesbrough Council election
Mayor before election
Andy Preston
Independent
No overall control
Mayor after election
Chris Cooke
Labour

The 2023 Middlesbrough Borough Council election took place on 4 May 2023 to elect all 46 members of Middlesbrough Council and the directly-elected Mayor of Middlesbrough. This was on the same day as other local elections across England.

Prior to the election the council was under no overall control and the mayor was Andy Preston, an independent. The election saw Labour's candidate Chris Cooke win the mayoralty from Andy Preston, and the party also won a majority of the seats on the council.

== Summary ==
=== Council ===
Following the results, the council moved from no overall control to a Labour majority.

2023 Middlesbrough Council election
Party	Candidates	Seats	Gains	Losses	Net gain/loss	Seats %	Votes %	Votes	+/−
Labour	44	25	7	2	▲5	54.3	46.5	25,504	+11.6
Independent	39	15	1	9	▼8	32.6	30.1	16,481	–13.6
Conservative	29	4	1	0	▲1	8.7	14.7	8,044	+2.8
Liberal Democrats	14	2	2	0	▲2	4.3	7.1	3,910	+3.8
Green	5	0	0	0	Steady	0.0	1.6	862	–1.5

=== Mayor ===
2023 Middlesbrough Mayoral election
Party	Candidate	Votes	%
Labour	Chris Cooke	10,956	40.2
Independent	Andy Preston	10,196	37.4
Independent	Jon Rathmell	3,102	11.4
Conservative	John Cooper	2,997	11.0
Majority		760	2.8
Turnout		27,479	27.8
Labour gain from Independent			

== Ward results ==
=== Acklam ===
Acklam (2 seats)
Party	Candidate	Votes	%	±%
Liberal Democrats	Tom Livingstone	867	48.4	+10.5
Labour	Sheila Dean*	644	35.9	–2.7
Liberal Democrats	Jon Carey	637	35.5	+15.6
Labour	Luke Henman	566	31.6	–4.1
Independent	Eric Polano*	276	15.4	–22.5
Independent	Peter Welsh	224	12.5	N/A
Conservative	Keith Barton	134	7.5	–16.3
Turnout		1,792	40.9	
Registered electors		4,382		
Liberal Democrats gain from Independent				
Labour hold				

=== Ayresome ===
Ayresome (2 seats)
Party	Candidate	Votes	%	±%
Labour	Antony High*	611	54.9	+24.1
Labour	Janet Thompson	457	41.1	+17.3
Independent	Andrew Hill	344	30.9	N/A
Conservative	Pam Biswas	236	21.2	+12.1
Liberal Democrats	Sophie Drumm	107	9.6	+4.7
Turnout		1,112	26.4	
Registered electors		4,215		
Labour gain from Independent				
Labour hold				

=== Berwick Hills & Pallister ===
Berwick Hills & Pallister (3 seats)
Party	Candidate	Votes	%	±%
Labour	Ian Blades*	451	47.9	+18.5
Labour	Julia Cooke	416	44.2	+20.8
Independent	Donna Jones*	391	41.5	–10.4
Independent	Steven James	346	36.7	N/A
Labour	Mick Thompson	336	35.7	+13.2
Independent	Anna Walker	303	32.2	N/A
Conservative	Alan Blyth	82	8.7	+3.4
Turnout		942	16.6	
Registered electors		5,674		
Labour gain from Independent				
Labour gain from Independent				
Independent hold				

=== Brambles & Thorntree ===
Brambles & Thorntree (3 seats)
Party	Candidate	Votes	%	±%
Labour	Stella Tranter	364	46.0	+17.1
Labour	Jack Banks	362	45.7	+17.7
Independent	Graham Wilson*	326	41.2	–8.5
Labour	Paul McGrath	319	40.3	+16.8
Independent	Karl Gallienne	256	32.3	N/A
Independent	Monty Towers	211	26.6	N/A
Conservative	Peter Longstaff	99	12.5	+4.6
Green	Rebecca Tyndall	43	5.4	N/A
Turnout		792	13.7	
Registered electors		5,781		
Labour hold				
Labour hold				
Independent hold				

=== Central ===
Central (3 seats)
Party	Candidate	Votes	%	±%
Labour	Linda Lewis*	1,053	70.8	+24.3
Labour	Matt Storey*	925	62.2	+24.8
Labour	Zafar Uddin*	876	58.9	+15.3
Independent	Jackie Young	331	22.2	N/A
Conservative	Peter Bradburn	218	14.7	+7.8
Green	Ian Sturrock	156	10.5	+1.0
Liberal Democrats	Ian Jones	145	9.7	+2.7
Turnout		1,488	21.0	
Registered electors		7,100		
Labour hold				
Labour hold				
Labour hold				

=== Coulby Newham ===
Coulby Newham (3 seats)
Party	Candidate	Votes	%	±%
Labour	David Branson*	899	45.0	+4.2
Conservative	Luke Mason	840	42.0	–6.5
Labour	Jo Nicholson	706	35.3	–15.0
Labour	Geoff Nicholson	673	33.7	+3.5
Conservative	Shamal Biswas	566	28.3	N/A
Independent	Stefan Walker*	544	27.2	N/A
Independent	Raymond Sands*	214	10.7	N/A
Green	Barry Jobson	209	10.5	N/A
Independent	Anna Whitmore	193	9.7	N/A
Turnout		2,000	31.8	
Registered electors		6,291		
Labour hold				
Conservative hold				
Labour hold				

=== Hemlington ===
Hemlington (2 seats)
Party	Candidate	Votes	%	±%
Labour	Jeanette Walker*	620	57.2	+19.0
Labour	Nicky Walker	577	53.3	+15.5
Independent	Allan Bell*	207	19.1	–21.5
Independent	Chris Lovell	181	16.7	N/A
Conservative	Sajid Hussain	153	14.1	+1.6
Conservative	Valerie Beadnall	145	13.4	+4.1
Independent	Howard Thompson	99	9.1	N/A
Turnout		1,083	25.1	
Registered electors		4,311		
Labour hold				
Labour gain from Independent				

=== Kader ===
Kader (2 seats)
Party	Candidate	Votes	%	±%
Independent	Jim Platt*	944	55.1	+6.5
Independent	Sharon Platt	732	42.8	N/A
Labour	Vic Walkington	537	31.4	+10.0
Conservative	Dominic Curtis	284	16.6	–0.4
Conservative	Catherine Lyon	241	14.1	N/A
Liberal Democrats	Michael Livingstone	200	11.7	+5.1
Turnout		1,712	39.6	
Registered electors		4,319		
Independent hold				
Independent hold				

=== Ladgate ===
Ladgate (2 seats)
Party	Candidate	Votes	%	±%
Independent	Tony Grainge*	605	67.4	N/A
Conservative	Luke Hurst	406	45.2	+10.4
Labour	Tom Mohan	367	40.9	–12.3
Labour	Gemma Rushton	352	39.2	–3.6
Liberal Democrats	Sally Middleton	66	7.3	N/A
Turnout		?	30.2	
Registered electors		?		
Independent gain from Labour				
Conservative gain from Labour				

=== Linthorpe ===
Linthorpe (2 seats)
Party	Candidate	Votes	%	±%
Labour	Philippa Storey*	975	46.7	+11.9
Labour	Naweed Hussain*	823	55.3	+23.1
Independent	John King	535	30.4	N/A
Liberal Democrats	Paul Hamilton	118	6.7	+0.3
Conservative	George Pugh	116	6.6	–2.1
Conservative	Oliver Connett	114	6.5	N/A
Turnout		1,762	39.6	
Registered electors		4,444		
Labour hold				
Labour hold				

=== Longlands & Beechwood ===
Longlands & Beechwood (3 seats)
Party	Candidate	Votes	%	±%
Labour	Mary Nugent*	647	46.8	+16.3
Labour	Peter Gavigan	572	41.4	+9.6
Independent	Joan McTigue*	563	40.7	–19.7
Labour	Sharon Sewell	491	35.5	+12.0
Independent	Jacqueline Fovargue	350	25.3	N/A
Independent	Amjad Hossain	200	14.5	N/A
Conservative	Nathaniel Tumilty	163	11.8	+1.0
Conservative	Stephen Smith	156	11.3	N/A
Liberal Democrats	Nana Livingstone	79	5.7	N/A
Turnout		1,382	20.6	
Registered electors		6,705		
Labour hold				
Labour hold				
Independent hold				

=== Marton East ===
Marton East (2 seats)
Party	Candidate	Votes	%	±%
Independent	Dorothy Davison*	784	52.5	–3.8
Independent	Jason McConnell	685	45.9	N/A
Labour	Mark O'Donnell	336	22.5	+9.7
Conservative	Firas Soudani	295	19.8	+0.1
Conservative	Peter Symon	261	17.5	–1.4
Labour	Alma Hellaoui	247	16.5	N/A
Liberal Democrats	Roger Paul	75	5.0	N/A
Turnout		1,493	31.6	
Registered electors		4,732		
Independent hold				
Independent hold				

=== Marton West ===
Marton West (2 seats)
Party	Candidate	Votes	%	±%
Independent	Ian Morrish	612	37.8	N/A
Independent	David Jackson	603	37.2	N/A
Conservative	Andy Murphy-Brown	531	32.8	+23.5
Conservative	Paul Austin	468	28.9	+20.4
Labour	Philip Ewan	306	18.9	+9.5
Liberal Democrats	Joanna Paul	161	9.9	N/A
Turnout		1,619	38.5	
Registered electors		4,206		
Independent hold				
Independent hold				

=== Newport ===
Newport (3 seats)
Party	Candidate	Votes	%	±%
Labour	John Kabuye	919	66.3	+27.5
Labour	Jill Ewan	911	65.7	+21.4
Labour	Anne Romaine	856	61.7	+18.0
Independent	Barrie Cooper*	326	23.5	–18.8
Green	David Revett	180	13.0	–3.7
Conservative	Joyce Pugh	174	12.5	+1.7
Liberal Democrats	Dinesh Maddula	115	8.3	–2.4
Turnout		1,387	21.8	
Registered electors		6,360		
Labour hold				
Labour hold				
Labour gain from Independent				

=== North Ormesby ===
North Ormesby
Party	Candidate	Votes	%	±%
Labour	Jan Ryles	224	54.1	+27.3
Independent	Steve McCulloch	161	38.9	N/A
Conservative	David Morgan	29	7.0	+3.8
Majority		63	15.2	
Turnout		420	22.1	
Registered electors		1,902		
Labour gain from Independent				

=== Nunthorpe ===
Nunthorpe (2 seats)
Party	Candidate	Votes	%	±%
Liberal Democrats	Morgan McClintock	712	39.7	+24.0
Conservative	Mieka Smiles*	687	38.3	+6.2
Liberal Democrats	Tom Bailey	509	28.4	+20.8
Conservative	Martin Lyon	397	22.1	+3.0
Independent	Wade Tovey	367	20.4	N/A
Independent	Jon Rathmell*	333	18.6	–40.7
Labour	David Drumm	196	10.9	+3.4
Labour	Julie McGee	126	7.0	N/A
Turnout		1,795	41.5	
Registered electors		4,323		
Liberal Democrats gain from Independent				
Conservative hold				

=== Park ===
Park (3 seats)
Party	Candidate	Votes	%	±%
Labour	Theo Furness*	1,240	59.3	+19.1
Labour	Julia Rostron*	1,191	56.9	+12.2
Labour	Edward Clynch	1,126	53.8	+16.8
Independent	Chris McIntyre*	460	22.0	–15.1
Independent	Frances McIntyre	435	20.8	N/A
Independent	Eddie Ndhlovu	335	16.0	N/A
Green	Matthew Harris	274	13.1	–18.5
Conservative	Valerie Symon	264	12.6	–2.7
Liberal Democrats	Jack Stoker	119	5.7	N/A
Turnout		2,092	30.8	
Registered electors		6,784		
Labour hold				
Labour hold				
Labour gain from Independent				

=== Park End & Beckfield ===
Park End & Beckfield (3 seats)
Party	Candidate	Votes	%	±%
Independent	Brian Hubbard*	640	60.5	–13.4
Independent	Mick Saunders*	609	57.6	–11.3
Independent	Stephen Hill	568	53.7	–10.3
Labour	Chris Williamson	328	31.0	+18.5
Labour	Eddie Dryden	261	24.7	+16.4
Labour	Jai Caisley	249	23.6	+15.4
Conservative	Margaret Blyth	82	7.8	+4.6
Conservative	Ryan Howes	58	5.5	N/A
Turnout		1,057	19.3	
Registered electors		5,469		
Independent hold				
Independent hold				
Independent hold				

=== Stainton & Thornton ===
Stainton & Thornton
Party	Candidate	Votes	%	±%
Conservative	David Coupe	625	54.0	–26.4
Labour	Jack McKenna	533	46.0	+26.4
Majority		92	8.0	
Turnout		1,174	35.6	
Registered electors		3,298		
Conservative hold		Swing	▼26.4	

=== Trimdon ===
Trimdon (2 seats)
Party	Candidate	Votes	%	±%
Independent	Dennis McCabe*	673	48.8	–20.7
Independent	Christine Cooper	515	37.4	N/A
Labour	Christina Harris	472	34.3	+22.2
Labour	James Watson	364	26.4	+15.9
Conservative	Scott Symon	220	16.0	+8.3
Turnout		1,378	29.2	
Registered electors		4,712		
Independent hold				
Independent hold				

== Changes 2023–2027 ==
- 14 January 2026: Christine Cooper (Independent, Trimdon) joined Reform UK, having left the Middlesbrough Independent Councillors Association the previous August.

=== By-elections ===
==== Ayresome ====
Ayresome: 17 August 2023
Party	Candidate	Votes	%	±%
Independent	Jackie Young	318	36.1	N/A
Labour	Mick Thompson	294	33.4	−21.5
Liberal Democrats	Claire Brent	201	22.8	+13.2
Green	Matthew Harris	32	3.6	N/A
Conservative	Sajid Hussain	30	3.4	−17.8
Independent	Jon Rathmell	5	0.6	N/A
Majority		24	2.7	
Turnout		880	20.9	
Registered electors		4,224		
Independent gain from Labour				

The by-election was held after Labour councillor Antony High resigned at the end of June 2023, citing a change in his personal work situation. High had originally been elected as an independent in 2019 and served as deputy mayor before defecting to Labour in March 2022.

==== Acklam ====
Acklam by-election: 4 July 2024
Party	Candidate	Votes	%	±%
Labour	Luke Henman	1,067	38.9	+3.0
Liberal Democrats	Mark Brown	850	31.0	−17.4
Independent	Jules Nicholson	466	17.0	N/A
Conservative	Eric Phillips	361	13.2	+5.7
Majority		217	7.9	
Turnout		2,770	62.4	+21.5
Rejected ballots		26		
Registered electors		4,442		
Labour hold				

The by-election was held after Labour councillor Sheila Dean stood down for health reasons, having represented Acklam since the 2015 boundary review.

==== Central ====
Central by-election: 4 July 2024
Party	Candidate	Votes	%	±%
Labour	Lewis Young	1,644	60.5	−10.3
Conservative	Sajid Hussain	491	18.1	+3.4
Independent	Keith Young	366	13.5	N/A
Liberal Democrats	Ian Jones	216	7.9	−1.8
Majority		1,153	42.4	
Turnout		2,760	35.0	+14.0
Rejected ballots		43		
Registered electors		7,888		
Labour hold				

The by-election was held after Labour councillor Matt Storey resigned to take up the post of Police and Crime Commissioner for Cleveland, to which he was elected on 2 May 2024.

==== Hemlington ====
Hemlington: 24 October 2024
Party	Candidate	Votes	%	±%
Labour	Thomas Mohan	422	53.1	−2.2
Conservative	Lewis Melvin	251	31.6	+17.9
Independent	Barrie Cooper	55	6.9	N/A
Workers Party	Mehmoona Ameen	47	5.9	N/A
Liberal Democrats	Christopher Henderson	20	2.5	N/A
Majority		171	21.5	−21.6
Turnout		795	18.91	−12.5
Registered electors		4,220		
Labour hold				

The by-election was held following the death of Labour councillor Jeanette Walker on 16 August 2024, after a long-term illness. Walker had represented Hemlington for 17 years, since 2007.

==== Nunthorpe ====
Nunthorpe by-election: 4 December 2025
Party	Candidate	Votes	%	±%
Reform	Joanne Rush	563	35.8	N/A
Liberal Democrats	Adrian Walker	550	35.0	−1.3
Conservative	Martin Lyon	328	20.9	−14.2
Green	Sam Boardman	79	5.0	N/A
Labour	Richard Lewis	52	3.3	−6.7
Majority		13	0.8	
Turnout		1,572	35.75	
Reform gain from Liberal Democrats		Swing	N/A	

The by-election was held after Liberal Democrat councillor Morgan McClintock resigned on 26 October 2025, amid what he described as an "unstable environment" over the management of local community projects, saying he wanted residents to have the chance to "choose the way forward" through an election.
