= Laurence Jackson School =

Location
- Church Lane; Guisborough, Redcar and Cleveland, TS14 6RD; England; 54°32′30″N 1°02′43″W

Information
- Type: Academy
- Founder: North Riding Education Committee
- Local authority: Redcar and Cleveland
- Trust: Spark Educational Trust
- Department for Education URN: 147724 Tables
- Ofsted: Reports
- Headteacher: Catherine Juckes
- Gender: Coeducational
- Age: 11 to 16
- Enrolment: 1,338
- Area: Redcar & Cleveland
- Website: https://www.laurencejackson.org

Laurence Jackson School is a coeducational secondary school located in Guisborough, North Yorkshire, England. It has a capacity of 1,250 pupils.

The school's headteacher is Catherine Juckes, who took the role in September 2018.

A 2019 Ofsted inspection judged Laurence Jackson School as "inadequate" in all aspects, including achievement, teaching, behaviour of pupils, leadership and overall effectiveness. As of 2024 the school's Ofsted rating has improved to "Good" in all areas. Laurence Jackson School joined the Vision Academy Trust in 2020.

== 2014 School rebuild ==
In 2014 it was confirmed that a state-of-the-art new school building would replace the ageing facility then in place. In May 2014 Miller Construction was contracted for the design and construction of the school as well as maintenance and life-cycle services for 25 years. The build was then taken over by the Priority School Building Programme (PSBP) and the new building, built by Galliford Try, was open to students in September 2016. In November 2016 a brand-new artificial football pitch was opened by then Middlesbrough FC player Ben Gibson.

== Notable pupils ==
- Bob Champion, jockey
- Paul Drinkhall, table tennis player
- Rod Liddle, journalist
- Selina Scott, TV presenter and journalist
- Connor Simpson, footballer
- Mark Sunley, footballer
- Roger Evans, Baron Evans of Guisborough – Politician; former Member of the London Assembly and Statutory Deputy Mayor of London.
- Faye Marsay, actor

== Notable staff ==
- Chris Cooke, later Mayor of Middlesbrough, previously worked at the school as an IT technician
