= 2007 Middlesbrough Borough Council election =

2007 UK local government election

Results of the 2007 Middlesbrough Borough Council election

The 2007 Middlesbrough Borough Council election took place on Thursday 3 May 2007 to elect all 48 councillors, across 23 multi-member wards to Middlesbrough Borough Council. The Labour Party retained a majority on the council.

== Overall results ==
Middlesbrough Borough Council Election Result 2007
| Party | Seats | Gains | Losses | Net gain/loss | Seats % | Votes % | Votes | +/− |
|---|---|---|---|---|---|---|---|---|
| Labour | 26 | | | | | | | |
| Independent | 10 | | | | | | | |
| Conservative | 6 | | | | | | | |
| Liberal Democrats | 5 | | | | | | | |
| Middlesbrough Independents | 1 | | | | | | | |

A total of valid votes were cast and there were rejected ballots.
The turnout was %.

== Council Composition ==
After the election the composition of the council was:

↓
| 26 | 10 | 6 | 5 | 1 |
| Labour | Independent | Con | L | MI |

Con - Conservative Party
L - Liberal Democrats
MI - Middlesbrough Independents

== Results by ward ==
=== Acklam Ward ===
Acklam
| Party | Candidate | Votes | % |
|---|---|---|---|
| Independent | Ron Lowes | 1,509 | 45.1 |
| Labour | Shyamal Kumar Biswas | 783 | 23.4 |
| Conservative | Val Finley | 555 | 16.6 |
| Conservative | John Henzell Hemy | 500 | 14.9 |

=== Ayresome Ward ===
Ayresome
| Party | Candidate | Votes | % |
|---|---|---|---|
| Labour | Bernard Edward Taylor | 416 | 23.2 |
| Independent | Barbara Dunne | 413 | 23.0 |
| Labour | Mary Clare Bishop | 409 | 22.8 |
| Independent | Bill Hawthorne | 408 | 22.7 |
| Conservative | Samantha Kerr | 148 | 8.2 |

=== Beckfield Ward ===
Beckfield
| Party | Candidate | Votes | % |
|---|---|---|---|
| Independent | Brian Anthony Hubbard | 874 | 40.4 |
| Independent | Peter Alexander Cox | 727 | 33.6 |
| Labour | Bob Brady | 280 | 13.0 |
| Labour | Dennis Burns | 225 | 10.4 |
| Conservative | Margaret Warman | 55 | 2.5 |

=== Beechwood Ward ===
Beechwood
| Party | Candidate | Votes | % |
|---|---|---|---|
| Independent | Joan McTigue | 635 | 31.8 |
| Labour | Garry Bartliff Clark | 436 | 21.9 |
| Labour | Teresa Higgins | 381 | 19.1 |
| Independent | Keshore Debnath | 366 | 18.3 |
| Independent | Bill McCallum | 177 | 8.9 |

=== Brookfield Ward ===
Brookfield
| Party | Candidate | Votes | % |
|---|---|---|---|
| Conservative | George Rogers | 808 | 26.1 |
| Conservative | Patricia Rogers | 663 | 21.4 |
| Labour | Jean Sharrocks | 631 | 20.4 |
| Middlesbrough Independents | Ken Hall | 613 | 19.8 |
| Labour | Janet Elizabeth Thompson | 382 | 12.3 |

=== Clairville Ward ===
Clairville
| Party | Candidate | Votes | % |
|---|---|---|---|
| Labour | Bob Kerr | 563 | 42.2 |
| Labour | Charles Michael Rooney | 451 | 33.8 |
| Middlesbrough Independents | Pat Walker | 321 | 24.0 |

=== Coulby Newham Ward ===
Coulby Newham
| Party | Candidate | Votes | % |
|---|---|---|---|
| Labour | Paul Thompson | 979 | 21.4 |
| Labour | John Geoffrey Cole | 887 | 19.4 |
| Labour | Jan Brunton | 764 | 16.7 |
| Liberal Democrats | Archie Bain | 569 | 12.5 |
| Conservative | Joanne Daniels | 468 | 10.2 |
| Conservative | Rachael Peacock | 387 | 8.5 |
| Middlesbrough Independents | Emma Campbell | 179 | 3.9 |
| Middlesbrough Independents | Jackie Campbell | 173 | 3.8 |
| Middlesbrough Independents | Carol Maughan | 164 | 3.6 |

=== Gresham Ward ===
Gresham
| Party | Candidate | Votes | % |
|---|---|---|---|
| Middlesbrough Independents | Ken Walker | 773 | 18.0 |
| Labour | Tony Bishop | 753 | 17.6 |
| Labour | Javed Ismail | 749 | 17.5 |
| Middlesbrough Independents | Peter Birt | 679 | 15.8 |
| Labour | Sajaad Khan | 679 | 15.8 |
| Middlesbrough Independents | Cath Rozevskis | 652 | 15.2 |

=== Hemlington Ward ===
Hemlington
| Party | Candidate | Votes | % |
|---|---|---|---|
| Labour | Nicky Walker | 757 | 31.5 |
| Labour | Jeanette Ann Walker | 747 | 31.1 |
| Liberal Democrats | Michael Heath | 342 | 14.2 |
| Liberal Democrats | Ron Phillips | 337 | 14.0 |
| Conservative | Kathryn Shanley | 111 | 4.6 |
| Conservative | Lenore Sizer | 111 | 4.6 |

=== Kader Ward ===
Kader
| Party | Candidate | Votes | % |
|---|---|---|---|
| Conservative | Hazel Pearson | 1,088 | 37.1 |
| Conservative | Maureen Whatley | 836 | 28.5 |
| Labour | Christopher John Nestor | 399 | 13.6 |
| Labour | Daniel Howard Booth | 391 | 13.3 |
| Liberal Democrats | David Foster | 222 | 7.6 |

=== Ladgate Ward ===
Ladgate
| Party | Candidate | Votes | % |
|---|---|---|---|
| Labour | David Budd | 727 | 39.5 |
| Labour | Michael Carr | 646 | 35.1 |
| Middlesbrough Independents | June Shippey | 466 | 25.3 |

=== Linthorpe Ward ===
Linthorpe
| Party | Candidate | Votes | % |
|---|---|---|---|
| Independent | Barbara Jacqueline Elder | 1,131 | 19.0 |
| Labour | Stephen Edward Bloundele | 1,061 | 17.9 |
| Labour | Julia Rostron | 932 | 15.7 |
| Labour | Naveed Hussain | 870 | 14.7 |
| Independent | John Skidmore | 738 | 12.4 |
| Liberal Democrats | Chris McIntyre | 647 | 10.9 |
| Conservative | Ron Darby | 559 | 9.4 |

=== Marton Ward ===
Marton
| Party | Candidate | Votes | % |
|---|---|---|---|
| Liberal Democrats | Tom Mawston | 903 | 38.2 |
| Liberal Democrats | Dorothy Davison | 847 | 35.9 |
| Conservative | Susan Leyshon | 234 | 9.9 |
| Conservative | Joanne Thistlethwaite | 229 | 9.7 |
| Labour | Linda Wilson | 148 | 6.3 |

=== Marton West Ward ===
Marton West
| Party | Candidate | Votes | % |
|---|---|---|---|
| Conservative | Chris Hobson | 958 | 34.3 |
| Conservative | Terry Ward | 859 | 30.7 |
| Labour | David John Branson | 595 | 21.3 |
| Liberal Democrats | Claire Lowe | 384 | 13.7 |

=== Middlehaven Ward ===
Middlehaven
| Party | Candidate | Votes | % |
|---|---|---|---|
| Labour | Pervaz Khan | 449 | 38.3 |
| Labour | John McPartland | 412 | 35.1 |
| Middlesbrough Independents | Alf Hannaford | 160 | 13.6 |
| Middlesbrough Independents | Mark Keenan | 152 | 13.0 |

=== North Ormesby and Brambles Farm Ward ===
North Ormesby and Brambles Farm
| Party | Candidate | Votes | % |
|---|---|---|---|
| Labour | Allan Jones | 582 | 41.3 |
| Labour | Eleanor Lancaster | 522 | 37.1 |
| Conservative | Elizabeth Dawson | 186 | 13.2 |
| New Nationalist Party | Tim Simons | 118 | 8.4 |

=== Nunthorpe Ward ===
Nunthorpe
| Party | Candidate | Votes | % |
|---|---|---|---|
| Independent | Brenda Alice Thompson | 1,057 | 32.2 |
| Independent | Peter Sanderson | 735 | 22.4 |
| Conservative | John Hobson | 436 | 13.3 |
| Conservative | Caroline Fletcher | 386 | 11.8 |
| Liberal Democrats | Andrew Earnshaw | 294 | 9.0 |
| Labour | Martin Turner Booth | 194 | 5.9 |
| Liberal Democrats | Jackie Simmonds | 176 | 5.4 |

=== Pallister Ward ===
Pallister
| Party | Candidate | Votes | % |
|---|---|---|---|
| Labour | John Barry Coppinger | 553 | 41.0 |
| Labour | Eddie Dryden | 481 | 35.6 |
| Middlesbrough Independents | Pam Davies | 159 | 11.8 |
| Middlesbrough Independents | Michael Rozevskis | 83 | 6.1 |
| Conservative | Kerry Latham | 74 | 5.5 |

=== Park Ward ===
Park
| Party | Candidate | Votes | % |
|---|---|---|---|
| Liberal Democrats | Joe Michna | 1,071 | 44.6 |
| Liberal Democrats | Frances McIntyre | 591 | 24.6 |
| Labour | Zafar Uddin | 583 | 24.3 |
| Conservative | Gillian Reeve | 156 | 6.5 |

=== Park End Ward ===
Park End
| Party | Candidate | Votes | % |
|---|---|---|---|
| Independent | Kevin John Morby | 547 | 32.1 |
| Labour | Peter Elvyn Porley | 472 | 27.7 |
| Labour | Mike McGee | 356 | 20.9 |
| Independent | James Martin | 331 | 19.4 |

=== Stainton and Thornton Ward ===
Stainton and Thornton
| Party | Candidate | Votes | % |
|---|---|---|---|
| Liberal Democrats | Maelor Brian Williams | 535 | 64.9 |
| Conservative | Dorothy Smith | 166 | 20.1 |
| Labour | Richard John Speakman | 123 | 14.9 |

=== Thorntree Ward ===
Thorntree
| Party | Candidate | Votes | % |
|---|---|---|---|
| Labour | Peter Purvis | 414 | 32.4 |
| Independent | Walter Ferrier | 382 | 29.9 |
| Labour | Mick Thompson | 323 | 25.3 |
| Middlesbrough Independents | Linda Walker | 90 | 7.0 |
| Conservative | Mark Warman | 69 | 5.4 |

=== University Ward ===
University
| Party | Candidate | Votes | % |
|---|---|---|---|
| Labour | Habib Rehman | 763 | 40.0 |
| Labour | Abdul Majid | 759 | 39.8 |
| Middlesbrough Independents | Muriel Birt | 220 | 11.5 |
| Conservative | Gary Reidy | 164 | 8.6 |
