= Mark Sunley =

English footballer

Personal information
- Date of birth: 13 October 1971 (age 55)
- Place of birth: Guisborough, England
- Position: Centre back

Youth career
- 1988–1989: Middlesbrough

Senior career*
Years	Team	Apps	(Gls)
1989–1991	Middlesbrough	0	(0)
1991	Millwall	0	(0)
1991–1994	Darlington	35	(0)
1994	Halifax Town	8	(0)
–	Stalybridge Celtic	2	(0)
1995	Hartlepool United	2	(0)
–	Spennymoor United		
2000–2002	Gateshead	28	(0)
2002–2003	Guisborough Town		
2003	Gateshead	1	(0)
2003–2005	Guisborough Town		
2005–2006	Billingham Synthonia	22	(0)
- * Club domestic league appearances and goals

Mark Sunley (born 13 October 1971) is a former footballer who made 37 appearances in the Football League playing as a centre back for Darlington and Hartlepool United. He was on the books of Middlesbrough and Millwall, without playing for either in the League, and played non-league football for clubs including Halifax Town, Stalybridge Celtic, Spennymoor United, Gateshead, Guisborough Town and Billingham Synthonia.

== Life and career ==
Sunley was born in Guisborough, Yorkshire, where he attended Laurence Jackson School. As a youngster, he played for Hartburn Juniors in Stockton, from where he joined Middlesbrough's youth system. On leaving school he was taken on the club's YTS scheme and then given a professional contract by manager Bruce Rioch. He played for the club in the 1990 FA Youth Cup final, a 3–2 defeat over two legs to Tottenham Hotspur, but never broke through to the first team. When Colin Todd took over as Middlesbrough manager, Sunley followed Rioch to Millwall in 1991, but again never played first-team football.

He finally made his Football League debut with Third Division club Darlington in the 1991–92 season, and went on to make 35 league appearances over three seasons. In the 1994–95 season, he played eight times for Halifax Town in the Conference, twice for Stalybridge Celtic also in the Conference, and twice in the Third Division (fourth tier) for Hartlepool United, and then joined Northern Premier League club Spennymoor United.

Sunley made five substitute appearances for Gateshead in the Northern Premier League in 2000–01, and played rather more frequently in the following season. In August 2002, he was told he was free to leave, and signed for hometown club Guisborough of the Northern League. He spent most of that season playing regularly for Guisborough, returning to Gateshead for three matches at the end – the second leg of the Northern Premier League Challenge Cup against Marine, one league match, and the play-off semi-final defeat to Chorley – and resumed his Guisborough career in 2003–04. He spent the 2005–06 season with another Northern League club, Billingham Synthonia.

Outside football, Sunley worked as sports development officer at his former school, Laurence Jackson in Guisborough. Among his duties was coaching girls' football. In 2013, the school's team reached the final of the English Schools' Football Association under-16 competition, losing 3–2 to the holders.
