= CEO Sleepout UK =

CEO Sleepout UK is a charity that raises money to fight homelessness and poverty across the UK. Money is raised by business executives being sponsored to sleep rough for a night.

CEO Sleepout was formed in December 2013 by Middlesbrough-based businessman Andy Preston, who is chairman of the charity, following a conversation with Bernie Fehon of Australia who created and organises similar projects there known as the 'Vinnies CEO Sleepout'. The first sleepout was held outside the Riverside Stadium, Middlesbrough Football Club and the second inside St James’ Park, home of Newcastle United Football Club.

Since then events have been held at numerous locations including Wembley Stadium, The Oval, Old Trafford Cricket Ground and Cardiff Castle, raising nearly £800,000. More than 90 businesspeople took part in a Wembley event in October 2014, which helped to raise funds for the Cardinal Hume Centre and DePaul UK. DePaul UK is part of Society of Saint Vincent de Paul. At a second London event in 2015, £180,000 was raised in what represented the biggest CEO Sleepout event to date.

Just before Christmas 2016 CEO Sleepout opened a not-for-profit restaurant in Middlesbrough, The Fork in the Road, which gave training and employment opportunities to the long-term unemployed including ex-offenders and recovering addicts, working alongside experienced catering professionals. Bar Zero, a dry bar for the recovery community, opened upstairs from The Fork in the Road early in 2017. Funds from the restaurant are planned to give support to Bar Zero. In June 2017, news broke that The Fork in the Road was now No 1 restaurant in Middlesbrough, as rated by reviewers on Tripadvisor. The restaurant then announced plans for Sunday dinner with a difference, served up by prisoners from the nearby HMP Kirklevington Grange as part of its policy of creating opportunities for those in society in need of a second chance. In September 2017 Preston admitted he no longer had the time to run the restaurant and announced that athlete Matty Hynes would take over as general manager of The Fork in the Road.

As with many of the charity's events, Andy Preston himself took part in the third sleepout to be held on Teesside in May 2016 when about 60 local businesspeople slept rough at Preston Park, Stockton-on-Tees Museum in Eaglescliffe, raising £45,000.

In 2016 the charity announced a partnership with the UK arm of international business Leesa, a company with a significant track record of philanthropy, donating one mattress to charity for every 10 they sell.

In November 2016, CEO Sleepout achieved the milestone of £1 million raised.

CEO Sleepout UK is a sister charity of Middlesbrough and Teesside Philanthropic Foundation.
