= Chris Cooke (politician) =

Mayor of Middlesbrough

Mayor Chris Cooke
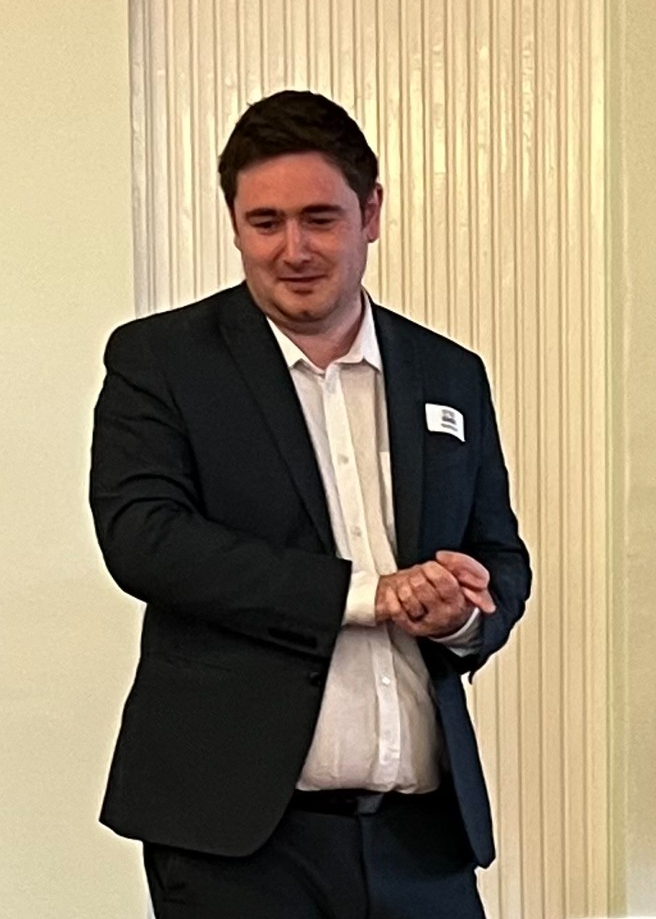

Mayor of Middlesbrough
- Incumbent
- Assumed office 4 May 2023
- Deputy: Philippa Storey
- Preceded by: Andy Preston

Personal details
- Born: 1990 (age 35–36) Middlesbrough, Cleveland, England
- Party: Labour

Chris Cooke (born 1990) is a British Labour Party politician who has served as the directly elected Mayor of Middlesbrough leading Middlesbrough Council since May 2023.

== Early life ==
Cooke was born in 1990 in Middlesbrough, Cleveland, England. He grew up in care. He was educated at St Peter's Secondary School, a Catholic school in South Bank, Redcar and Cleveland.

After school, Cooke began an apprenticeship at Laurence Jackson School in Guisborough as an IT technician. He remained at the school after completing his apprenticeship. Some time after being elected a councillor in 2019, he left his IT job and became a community cohesion co-ordinator at Streets Ahead, a charitable help and advice centre in Middlesbrough.

== Political career ==
In the 2019 local elections held on 2 May, Cooke was elected as one of three Labour Party councillors to represent the Newport ward on Middlesbrough Council.

On 4 May 2023, in the 2023 Middlesbrough Council election, he was elected Mayor of Middlesbrough with 10,956 votes, defeating the incumbent Andy Preston by 760 votes.

Shortly after his election, Cooke expressed the need for a change of culture within Middlesbrough Council stating there to be “an adversarial culture between politicians and officers”. He vowed the council he leads would become "a service-led organisation", and that children's social care would get his full focus.

As Mayor of Middlesbrough, he is a member of the Tees Valley Combined Authority Cabinet.

== Personal life ==
Cooke is married to Julia Cooke, who was elected as a Labour councillor for the Berwick Hills and Pallister ward on Middlesbrough Council in 2023.
