= Ray Mallon =

British politician (born 1955)

Mayor of Middlesbrough
- In office 6 May 2002 – 10 May 2015
- Preceded by: Office created
- Succeeded by: Dave Budd

Personal details
- Born: June 1955 (age 70–71) Thornaby-on-Tees, Yorkshire
- Party: Independent

Ray Mallon (born 1955) is a British politician who was the independent Mayor of Middlesbrough from 2002 to 2015. Prior to his political career he served in the police until he resigned after pleading guilty to charges of misconduct.

== Early life ==
Mallon was born to an undertaker and was raised as a Catholic. He left school at the age of sixteen with no qualifications. He played water polo internationally.

== Police career ==
Mallon joined Cleveland Police in 1974. He was appointed detective chief inspector for Hartlepool in 1994. During his tenure in this role, crime fell in the area by 35%. He was promoted to detective superintendent in November 1996, and crime rates continued to fall. Mallon was nicknamed "Robocop" over his New York-inspired zero tolerance approach to anti-social crime. This approach was praised by Tony Blair and by home secretaries, but was criticised by police officers as "old-style confrontational policing".

=== Investigation and resignation ===
In December 1997, Mallon was one of sixty-one police officers suspended from duty amid allegations of misconduct as part of Operation Lancet. Claims against the officers included tipping off suspects and exchanging drugs for confessions. Charges against Mallon included nine of neglect of duty, three of falsehood and prevarication, one of discreditable conduct and one of misconduct towards of a member of the police force, which he described as "minor" disciplinary matters. By June 2000, the Crown Prosecution Service had found insufficient evidence to bring criminal charges against any of the officers involved. Mallon remained under internal disciplinary investigation. He offered his resignation in August 2001, but this was rejected by the chief constable so that a disciplinary hearing could take place. He pleaded guilty to all fourteen charges against him in February 2002, claiming he did nothing wrong but only pleaded guilty so he could be free to stand to be Mayor of Middlesbrough, as police officers are unable to campaign politically. The chief constable, Barry Shaw, described Mallon as "a liar at the centre of an empire of evil".

After his resignation and before his election, Mallon worked as a consultant for a bathroom company.

== Mayor of Middlesbrough ==
Mallon was elected as the first Mayor of Middlesbrough in 2002, winning more than 60% of the vote as an independent candidate. He accepted applications for roles in his nine-member cabinet from all parties, though the Labour group on the council initially maintained a boycott. He kept a council of seven Labour councillors, one Conservative and one independent.

He increased the use of CCTV in the town centre and started a programme of neighbourhood wardens that brought street offences to a historic low. Many residents in Gresham, near central Middlesbrough, including ward councillor and former council leader Ken Walker, vocally opposed Mallon-supported 2005 plans to demolish 1,453 homes across thirty-seven streets as part of a regeneration scheme. Mallon ordered the demolition to pause in 2013 after 280 properties were demolished, saying he had made a mistake. The final demolition plan was scaled back to 561 homes. Mallon proclaimed a boycott of Channel 4 and protested to Ofcom over a description of Middlesbrough as the worst place to live in Britain as part of its programme Location, Location, Location.

In 2011, owner of local taxi firm Boro Taxis Mohammed Bashir published a recording of a conversation he had with Mallon in which the mayor made an inappropriate remark about a female colleague and used slurs on local British Asian taxi drivers. The Standards Board for England found that he had brought the office into disrepute and failed to declare an interest regarding his friendship with Bashir on two occasions.

The council sold Acklam Hall, the town's only Grade I-listed building, for £900,000 in 2014. The sale was criticised at the time as undervalued, with independent councillor Len Junier suggesting the deal made had been "dodgy". Mallon defended the sale and referred himself to the council's Standards Committee.

Mallon stood down in 2015, not contesting the mayoral election of that year. He declared that he would leave politics whilst leaving open the option of returning to politics if a local metro mayoralty were to be established.

== After mayoralty ==
After leaving the position of Mayor of Middlesbrough, Mallon took up a role as a non-executive director for a project to redevelop the site of Manston Airport in Kent. Controversy over the sale of Acklam Hall remained, with the former council monitoring officer Karen Whitmore claiming that then-deputy mayor Dave Budd had told her about a conversation in which Mallon had admitted discussion reducing the price of the building with a property developer, which Budd later denied. Sales of assets to Mallon's former election agent Nasser Din at prices lower than other offers that the council rejected as well as independent valuations were also criticised and investigated, with the Tees Valley Audit and Assurance Services finding that there was a "cause for concern bordering on significant concern" but without any evidence of criminal activity.

== Political views ==
Mallon has been sought for roles by both the Conservative Party and the Labour Party. He has described himself as a "socialist type" and "more of a Labour person" but not "anti-Conservative", and been identified with New Labour. He chaired a policing policy group for the Centre for Social Justice, a conservative think tank. In 2011, Mallon criticised cuts to local government as "a financial war on us" disproportionally affecting more deprived areas, while supporting deficit reduction in principle. He identified the greatest problem in Middlesbrough as premature death.

In the 2004 referendum on a North East England regional assembly, Mallon was described as a "late comer" to the race by BBC Look North political correspondent Richard Moss. Mallon supported a regional assembly, however the "yes" campaign was defeated by almost 500,000 votes, and lost in every electing council area.

Following his background in the police, Mallon kept focus on law and order. He has consistently expressed hostility towards beggars, including accusing them of begging as a more profitable alternative to crime.

Mallon was sceptical of the introduction of directly-elected police and crime commissioners. He opposes the system of directly elected mayors for local authorities and has advocated for a mayor for the Tees Valley.

== See also ==
- Police misconduct
- Directly elected mayors in England and Wales
- Local government in England

Preceded by Office created	Mayor of Middlesbrough; 2002 – 2015	Succeeded by Dave Budd
