= SleepOut.com =

Online marketplace

- Founded: 2011; 15 years ago in Nairobi
- Headquarters: Port Louis, Mauritius
- Key people: Johann Jenson (CEO); Paul Schwarz (CTO); Mikul Shah (COO)
- Industry: Lodging
- Website: sleepout.com
- Commercial: y
- Registration: y
- Current status: Redirects to Airbnb

SleepOut.com was an online marketplace for booking lodging in Africa, the Middle East, and the Indian Ocean islands.

It shutdown in February 2017 and the domain name now links to Airbnb.

== History ==
SleepOut was founded in December 2011 on Lamu Island, Kenya. The company was created by Canadian hospitality marketeer, Johann Jenson and Kenyan digital entrepreneur, Mikul Shah.

In June 2012, at the time of the beta launch, the platform listed 1,500 properties for rent throughout East Africa.

In March 2013, the company launched NOMAD, an online travel and lifestyle magazine.

In May 2013, the company received funding from Dutch venture capital firm, Africa Media Ventures Fund (AMVF).

In June 2013, Zimbabwean software engineer Paul Schwarz became chief technology officer.

Towards the end of 2013, the company released a user-generated platform offering 3,000 accommodation options in 32 countries across Africa, the Middle East, and the Indian Ocean islands.

In March 2014, the company moved its headquarters to Port Louis, Mauritius.

It shutdown in February 2017 and the domain name now links to Airbnb.
