= Middlesbrough and Teesside Philanthropic Foundation =

British charitable organisation

The Middlesbrough and Teesside Philanthropic Foundation is a philanthropic and charitable institution that was established in March 2011 in Middlesbrough, England as a patriotic and activist group which aims to raise money from businesses and affluent individuals to make Teesside a better place in which to live, work and do business. Andy Preston set up the foundation with the help of Tanya Garland and since launch Preston has recruited the financial backing of more than 40 businesses and individuals. Businesses involved as patrons of the Foundation include Middlesbrough Football Club, Steve Gibson's Bulkhaul, Cleveland Cable Company, Barclays Middlesbrough and AV Dawson.

As of December 2016, the charity had raised more than £2 million. Having celebrated reaching the £1 million fundraising milestone in September 2015, weeks later the charity received a further £700,000 from an anonymous benefactor.

The Foundation holds an Annual Dinner which raises around £40,000 each year, usually with a local theme. Those who have hosted or performed at the dinner include presenters Ali Brownlee and Mark Page, and Patrick Monahan (comedian), while artist Mackenzie Thorpe has also been hugely supportive of the charity and its dinners.

== Projects ==
=== Jobs and homelessness ===
The foundation creates new jobs in the area around Middlesbrough. In March 2016, it was reported that the charity had provided £40,000 to Community Campus '87 to create six apprenticeships for young, long-term unemployed people, helping to transform previously derelict properties into homes for homeless young people.

=== Art ===
Th Middlesbrough Institute of Modern Art (mima) art gallery and the foundation established Love Where You Live, a contest billed as the "country's biggest art competition". £41,000 of prize money was awarded to local schools and community groups.

=== Sport ===
In 2015, the foundation provided £30,000 to Wish Sport a campaign run by local newspaper, Teesside Gazette, in support of local not-for-profit sporting bodies. It was the fourth successive year the charity had provided £30,000 to be shared between Teesside sports clubs.

At the end of 2015, the foundation set up the FAST Fund to provide grants to help some of Teesside's most talented sportspeople fulfil their potential. The FAST Fund's committee includes Middlesbrough-born long jumper Chris Tomlinson, who has competed at three successive Olympic Games, and is also supported by top sprinter Richard Kilty, from Stockton-on-Tees. Among those to receive grants via the FAST Fund during its first few months after launch included swimmer Aimee Willmott ahead of competing in a second successive Olympics, and Jade Jones (athlete). Later winners of FAST Fund grants included footballer Matt Crossen, who had helped Great Britain reach the quarter-finals of the 2016 Paralympics, together with members of Middlesbrough Powerchair Football Club.

Middlesbrough Homeless Football Club was set up by the foundation, helping with initial funding of the club. The homeless football club was then moved to come under the umbrella of Middlesbrough and Teesside Sports Foundation, which also fell within the charity's remit.

=== Grandparents as children's guardians ===
Early in 2017, the foundation announced details of its biggest ever single donation, for the Teesside work of the Grandparents Plus charity. Up to 600 vulnerable children and their grandparents - their "kinship carers" - would be supported by a £100,000 donation when parents were unable to look after the children due to drug or alcohol misuse.
