= 2011 Middlesbrough Borough Council election =

2011 UK local government election

Results of the 2011 Middlesbrough Borough Council election

The 2011 Middlesbrough Borough Council election took place on Thursday 5 May 2011 to elect all 48 councillors, across 23 multi-member wards to Middlesbrough Borough Council. The Labour Party retained a majority on the council.

== Overall results ==
Middlesbrough Borough Council Election Result 2011
Party	Seats	Gains	Losses	Net gain/loss	Seats %	Votes %	Votes	+/−
Labour	30				62.50	51.14	32,443	
Independent	10				20.83	23.74	15,058	
Conservative	4				8.34	15.14	9,606	
Marton Independents	2				4.17	3.14	1,989	
Liberal Democrats	1				2.08	4.91	3,117	
Green	1				2.08	1.36	860	
UKIP	0				0.00	0.41	257	
BNP	0				0.00	0.16	103	

A total of 63,433 valid votes were cast and there were 328 rejected ballots.
The turnout was 36.35%.

== Council Composition ==
After the election the composition of the council was:

↓
30	10	4	2	1	1
Labour	Independent	Con	MI	L	G

Con - Conservative Party
MI - Marton Independents
L - Liberal Democrats
G - Green Party

== Results by ward ==
=== Acklam ===
Acklam (2 Seats)
Party	Candidate	Votes	%	±%
Independent	Ronnie Lowes	998	31.4	
Labour	Shyalam Kumar Biswas	888	27.95	
Liberal Democrats	Chris Foote-Wood	676	21.27	
Conservative	John Henzell Hemy	616	19.38	
Majority		212	6.68	
Turnout		3,178	46.97	

=== Ayresome ===
Ayresome
Party	Candidate	Votes	%	±%
Labour	Bernard Edward Taylor	693	27.90	
Independent	William Henry Hawthorne	592	23.83	
Labour	Scott Alexander Hurlston	586	23.59	
Independent	Pauline Hawthorne	412	16.59	
BNP	Michael Stewart Ferguson	103	4.15	
Conservative	Sheila Petrie	98	3.94	
Majority		6	0.24	
Turnout		2,484	32.96	

=== Beckfield ===
Beckfield (2 Seats)
Party	Candidate	Votes	%	±%
Independent	Brian Anthony Hubbard	787	36.33	
Independent	Peter Alexander Cox	720	33.24	
Labour	Dennis Burns	324	14.96	
Labour	Christopher Patrick McIntyre	287	13.25	
Conservative	Mark Owen Warman	48	2.22	
Majority		396	18.28	
Turnout		2,166	32.76	

=== Beechwood ===
Beechwood (2 Seats)
Party	Candidate	Votes	%	±%
Labour	Garry Bartliff Clark	567	31.66	
Independent	Joan McTigue	544	30.37	
Labour	Teresa Higgins	444	24.79	
Independent	Maureen O'Donoghue	154	8.60	
Conservative	Eric Dawson Smith	82	4.58	
Majority		100	5.58	
Turnout		1,791	30.18	

=== Brookfield ===
Brookfield (2 Seats)
Party	Candidate	Votes	%	±%
Labour	Jean Sharrocks	594	17.09	
Labour	Peter Sharrocks	563	16.20	
Independent	Kenneth Hall	523	15.05	
Independent	George W Rogers	426	12.26	
Conservative	Valerie Jean St. John Beadnall	422	12.14	
Independent	Patricia Rogers	281	8.09	
UKIP	David Cottrell	257	7.40	
Liberal Democrats	Richard M Kilpatrick	253	7.28	
Liberal Democrats	Samuel Dunning	156	4.49	
Majority		40	1.15	
Turnout		3,475	43.46	

=== Clairville ===
Clairville (2 Seats)
Party	Candidate	Votes	%	±%
Labour	William J R Kerr	743	38.54	
Labour	Charles Rooney	573	29.72	
Independent	Jill Powles Coleman	371	19.24	
Conservative	George Beasley	131	6.79	
Independent	Daud Bashir	110	5.71	
Majority		202	10.48	
Turnout		1,928	31.73	

=== Coulby Newham ===
Coulby Newham (3 Seats)
Party	Candidate	Votes	%	±%
Labour	John G Cole	1,318	22.45	
Labour	Janice Brunton	1,035	17.63	
Independent	Michael Hudson	1,014	17.27	
Labour	Robert M Campbell	1,008	17.17	
Independent	Steven Antony Maynard	961	16.37	
Conservative	David Philip Coupe	535	9.11	
Majority		6	0.10	
Turnout		5,871	35.89	

=== Gresham ===
Gresham (3 Seats)
Party	Candidate	Votes	%	±%
Labour	Sajaad Khan	939	25.56	
Labour	Robert K Brady	759	20.66	
Labour	Tracy Harvey	690	18.78	
Independent	Kenneth Walker	547	14.89	
Independent	Janet Campbell	425	11.57	
Liberal Democrats	Donald G Theakston	206	5.60	
Conservative	Deborah Wardle	108	2.94	
Majority		143	3.89	
Turnout		3,674	29.53	

=== Hemlington ===
Hemlington (2 Seats)
Party	Candidate	Votes	%	±%
Labour	Jeanette A Walker	1,212	46.40	
Labour	Nicola J Walker	1,165	44.60	
Conservative	Elizabeth Dawson	235	9.00	
Majority		930	35.60	
Turnout		2,612	35.53	

=== Kader ===
Kader (2 Seats)
Party	Candidate	Votes	%	±%
Conservative	Hazel Pearson	1,101	31.13	
Conservative	Ronald Arundale	921	26.04	
Labour	Richard Speakman	833	23.55	
Labour	Lewis Young	682	19.28	
Majority		88	2.49	
Turnout		3,537	49.82	

=== Ladgate ===
Ladgate (2 Seats)
Party	Candidate	Votes	%	±%
Labour	Michael Carr	828	37.18	
Labour	Christopher David Budd	813	36.51	
Independent	Michael Derek Guess	586	26.31	
Majority		227	10.20	
Turnout		2,227	36.84	

=== Linthorpe ===
Linthorpe (3 Seats)
Party	Candidate	Votes	%	±%
Labour	Stephen E Bloundele	1,577	21.42	
Labour	Julia Rostron	1,436	19.51	
Labour	Naweed Hussain	1,345	18.27	
Independent	B Jacqueline Elder	1,221	16.59	
Conservative	Thomas Wilkinson	665	9.03	
Liberal Democrats	Ian Godfrey Llewellyn Jones	575	7.81	
Liberal Democrats	Gary McArthur	297	4.03	
Liberal Democrats	Pramod Subbaraman	246	3.34	
Majority		124	1.68	
Turnout		7,362	46.33	

=== Marton ===
Marton (2 Seats)
Party	Candidate	Votes	%	±%
Marton Independent	Thomas W Mawston	1,032	35.22	
Marton Independent	Dorothy Davison	957	32.66	
Labour	Michael Kilgallon	568	19.39	
Conservative	James Ruddock	373	12.73	
Majority		389	13.27	
Turnout		2,930	44.87	

=== Marton West ===
Marton West (2 Seats)
Party	Candidate	Votes	%	±%
Conservative	Christine Hobson	1,370	41.65	
Conservative	John Eric Hobson	1,176	35.76	
Labour	David John Branson	743	22.59	
Majority		194	5.89	
Turnout		3,289	50.12	

=== Middlehaven ===
Middlehaven (2 Seats)
Party	Candidate	Votes	%	±%
Labour	Pervaz Khan	496	42.98	
Labour	John McPartland	443	38.39	
Liberal Democrats	Martin Brown	82	7.10	
Liberal Democrats	Emma Inkles	81	7.02	
Conservative	Kerry Luan Thompson Latham	52	4.51	
Majority		361	31.29	
Turnout		1,154	27.14	

=== North Ormesby & Brambles Farm ===
North Ormesby & Brambles Farm (2 Seats)
Party	Candidate	Votes	%	±%
Labour	Len Junier	803	50.89	
Labour	Eleanor Lancaster	606	38.40	
Conservative	Pamela Waterfield	169	10.71	
Majority		437	27.69	
Turnout		1,578	23.93	

=== Nunthorpe ===
Nunthorpe (2 Seats)
Party	Candidate	Votes	%	±%
Independent	Brenda Alice Thompson	1,381	40.37	
Independent	Peter Sanderson	1,061	31.01	
Conservative	Martin Timothy Lyon	560	16.37	
Labour	David Andrew Drumm	419	12.25	
Majority		501	14.64	
Turnout		3,421	48.71	

=== Pallister ===
Pallister (2 Seats)
Party	Candidate	Votes	%	±%
Labour	John B Coppinger	614	35.80	
Labour	Edward N Dryden	572	33.35	
Residents	John Thomas Conroy	443	25.83	
Conservative	Doris Lawrence	86	5.02	
Majority		129	7.52	
Turnout		1,715	25.35	

=== Park ===
Park (2 Seats)
Party	Candidate	Votes	%	±%
Green	Joseph Michna	860	33.50	
Labour	Frances McIntyre	852	33.19	
Labour	Najabat Ramzan	586	22.83	
Conservative	Samuel Hughes	269	10.48	
Majority		266	10.36	
Turnout		2,567	40.13	

=== Park End ===
Park End (2 Seats)
Party	Candidate	Votes	%	±%
Independent	Michael Saunders	611	31.24	
Independent	Kevin John Morby	392	20.04	
Labour	Joe W Culley	349	17.84	
Labour	Derek G Loughborough	337	17.23	
Independent	Peter Elvyn Porley	229	11.71	
Conservative	Cecilia Maureen Whatley	38	1.94	
Majority		43	2.20	
Turnout		1,956	27.15	

=== Stainton and Thornton ===
Stainton and Thornton
Party	Candidate	Votes	%	±%
Liberal Democrats	Maelor Brian Williams	545	57.31	
Labour	Stefan Walker	234	24.60	
Conservative	Richard Simon Madden	172	18.09	
Majority		311	32.71	
Turnout		951	40.94	

=== Thorntree ===
Thorntree (2 Seats)
Party	Candidate	Votes	%	±%
Labour	Thurston P Purvis	616	39.84	
Labour	Geraldine Purvis	576	37.26	
Independent	George W Charlton	269	17.40	
Conservative	Ronald Darby	85	5.50	
Majority		307	19.86	
Turnout		1,546	21.99	

=== University ===
University (2 Seats)
Party	Candidate	Votes	%	±%
Labour	Mohammed Hanif	870	43.05	
Labour	Habib Rehman	857	42.40	
Conservative	Eric Lawrence	294	14.55	
Majority		563	27.85	
Turnout		2,021	33.82	
