= Middlesbrough Council =

Local authority for the Borough of Middlesbrough, North Yorkshire, England

Coordinates: 54.5755°N 1.234°W

- Coat of arms

- Logo

Leadership
- Chair: Jack Banks, Labour since 21 May 2025
- Mayor: Chris Cooke, Labour since 8 May 2023
- Chief Executive: Erik Scollay since 27 November 2024

Structure
- Seats: 47 (46 councillors plus elected mayor)
- Graph of the party split among 47 seats.
- Political groups: Administration (25) Labour (24+1) Other parties (22) Conservative (4) Reform (2) Liberal Democrats (1) Independent (15)
- Joint committees: Tees Valley Combined Authority

Elections
- Voting system: First past the post
- Last election: 4 May 2023
- Next election: 6 May 2027

Meeting place
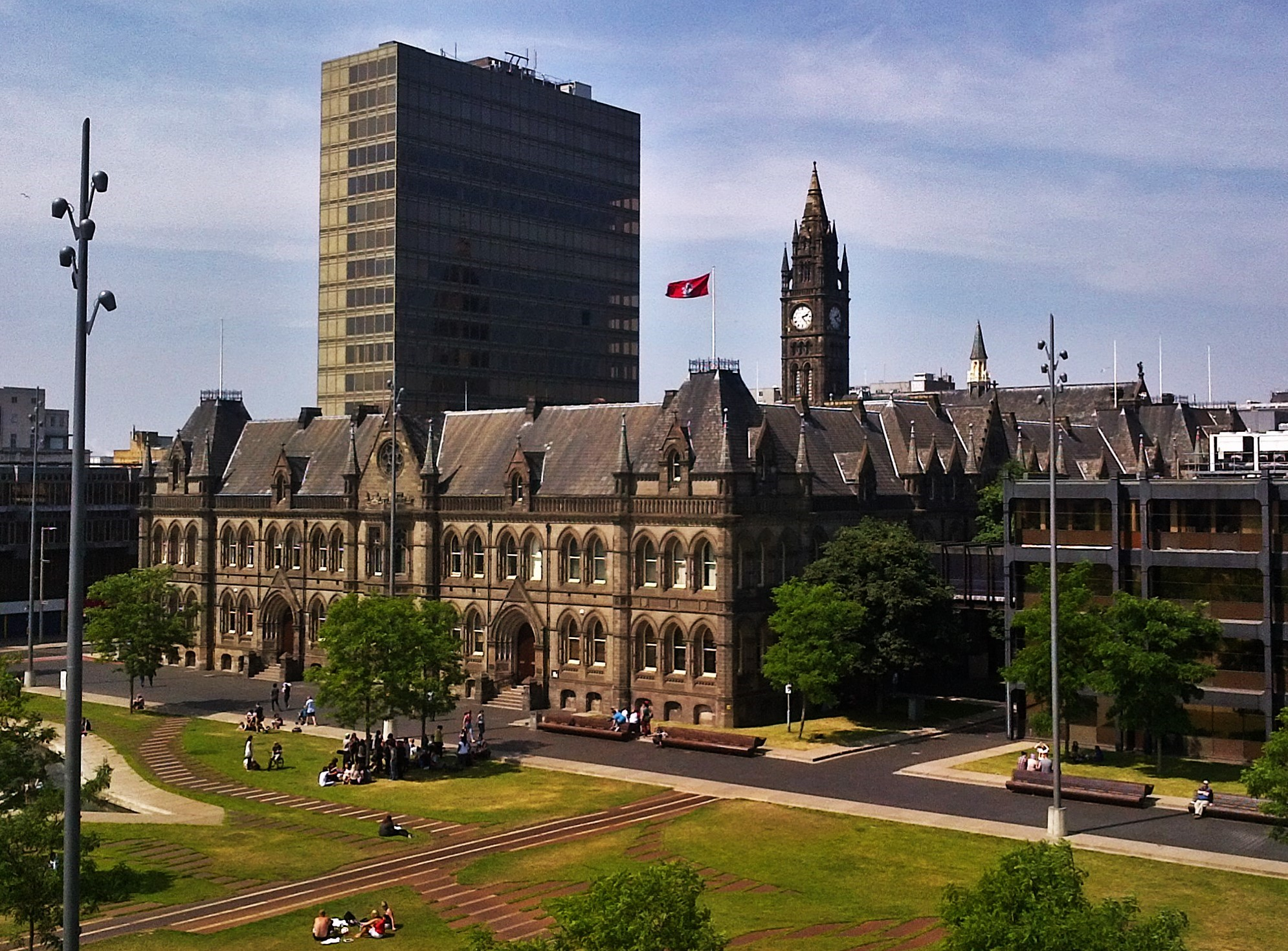
- Middlesbrough Town Hall

Website
- www.middlesbrough.gov.uk

Middlesbrough Council, also known as Middlesbrough Borough Council, is the local authority for the Borough of Middlesbrough in North Yorkshire, England. Since 1996 the council has been a unitary authority, being a district council which also performs the functions of a county council. Following the 2023 local elections, Labour has held majority control of the council. It is led by the directly-elected Mayor of Middlesbrough, who has been Chris Cooke of the Labour Party since 2023. The council meets at Middlesbrough Town Hall, and is a member of the Tees Valley Combined Authority.

== History ==
The town of Middlesbrough had been incorporated as a municipal borough in 1853. When elected county councils were established in 1889, Middlesbrough was considered large enough for its existing council to provide county-level services, and so it was made a county borough, independent from the new North Riding County Council, whilst remaining part of the North Riding of Yorkshire for ceremonial purposes.

The original borough of Middlesbrough was abolished in 1968, merging with several neighbouring authorities to become the County Borough of Teesside. That proved to be a short-lived local authority, being abolished just six years later when a new borough of Middlesbrough was created on 1 April 1974 under the Local Government Act 1972. The new borough covered the wards from Teesside which generally corresponded to both the pre-1968 borough and the former parishes of Hemlington, Marton and Stainton (which had all been abolished and absorbed into Teesside in 1968), plus the parish of Nunthorpe from the Stokesley Rural District. The re-created borough was a lower-tier district, being one of four districts within the new county of Cleveland. The county council provided county-level functions.

Cleveland County Council was abolished in 1996 following the Banham Review and the borough council took over county-level functions, in effect restoring Middlesbrough to the powers it had held prior to 1968 when it had been a county borough. The way the 1996 change was implemented was to create a new non-metropolitan county of Middlesbrough covering the same area as the existing borough, but with no separate county council; instead the existing borough council took on county functions, making it a unitary authority. At the same time the borough was transferred for ceremonial purposes to North Yorkshire, but as a unitary authority it has always been independent from North Yorkshire Council.

== Governance ==
The council calls itself Middlesbrough Council, although the longer name Middlesbrough Borough Council is also sometimes used. It provides both county-level and district-level services. There are two civil parishes in the borough at Nunthorpe and Stainton and Thornton which form a second tier of local government for their areas; while the rest of the borough is unparished.

Since 2016, the council has been a member of the Tees Valley Combined Authority.

=== Political control ===
The council has been under Labour majority control since the 2023 election.

Political control of the council since it was re-established in 1974 has been as follows:

Non-metropolitan district

Party in control	Years
Labour	1974–1996

Unitary authority

Party in control	Years
Labour	1996–2019
No overall control	2019–2023
Labour	2023–present

=== Leadership ===
Since 2002, political leadership on the council has been provided by the directly elected Mayor of Middlesbrough. Prior to 2002 the council was led by a leader of the council, and the mayor had a more ceremonial role. The leaders from 1981 to 2002 were:

Councillor	Party	From	To
Walter Ferrier	Labour	1981	1983
Michael Carr	Labour	1983	1995
Ken Walker	Labour	1995	5 May 2002

The directly elected mayors since 2002 have been: (Note: Mayoral terms of office run from the fourth day after polling day.)

Mayor	Party	From	To
Ray Mallon	Independent	6 May 2002	10 May 2015
Dave Budd	Labour	11 May 2015	5 May 2019
Andy Preston	Independent	6 May 2019	7 May 2023
Chris Cooke	Labour	8 May 2023	

=== Composition ===
Following the 2023 election, and subsequent by-elections and changes of allegiance up to September 2026, the composition of the council (excluding the elected mayor's seat) was:

Party	Seats
Labour	24
Conservative	4
Reform	2
Liberal Democrats	1
Independent	15
Total	46

Of the fifteen independent councillors, eight sit together as the "Middlesbrough Independent Councillors Association" and two form the "Marton East Independent Group"; the other five do not belong to a group. The next election is due in 2027.

== Elections ==
Since the last full review of boundaries in 2015 the council has comprised 43 councillors representing 20 wards, with each ward electing one, two or three councillors. Elections are held every four years.

== The Executive ==
Middlesbrough Council's senior decision making body is a committee known as the Executive. Similar to a cabinet, the Executive consists of the Mayor and up to nine councillors appointed by the Mayor, as of November 2024 they are as follows:

- Chris Cooke, Mayor
- Philippa Storey, Deputy Mayor and Executive Member for Education and Culture
- Jan Ryles, Executive Member for Public Health
- Peter Gavigan, Executive Member for Environment and Sustainability
- Theo Furness, Executive Member for Development
- Ian Blades, Executive Member for Neighbourhoods
- Nicky Walker, Executive Member for Finance
- Julia Rostron, Executive Member for Adult Social Care
- Luke Henman, Executive Member for Children's Services

== Premises ==
The council is based at Middlesbrough Town Hall on Albert Road in the centre of Middlesbrough. The building is in two parts, being the main hall on the corner of Corporation Road (primarily an entertainment venue) and the Municipal Buildings to the south of the hall, facing Centre Square, which were built together between 1883 and 1889. The council has additional offices in modern buildings near the Town Hall, notably at Middlesbrough House at 50 Corporation Road, which includes the customer centre, and at Fountain Court at 119 Grange Road.

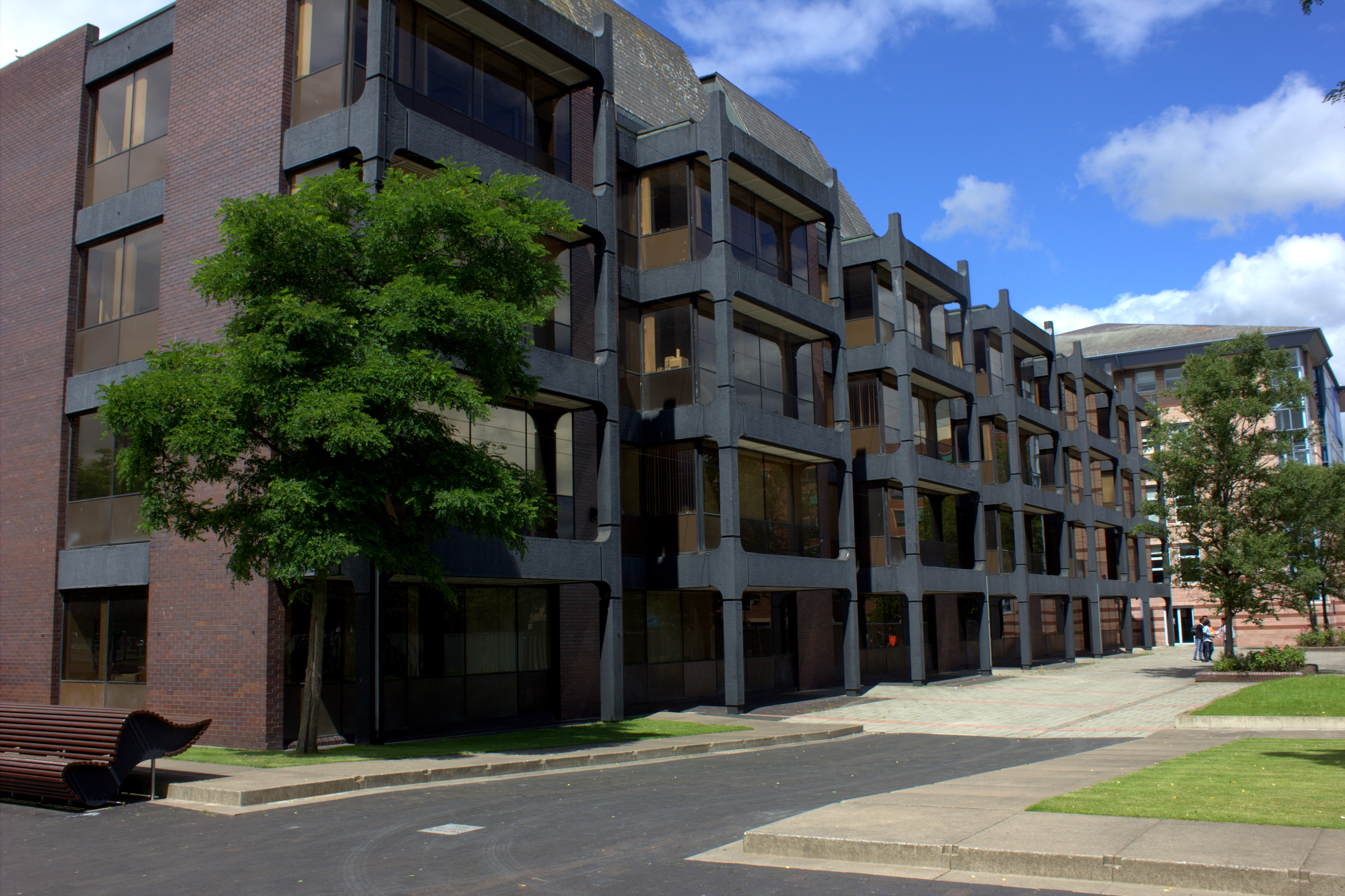
The Civic Centre served as the council's main offices between 1973 and 2022

The council's main offices were previously at the Civic Centre on Centre Square, immediately east of the Municipal Buildings and linked to them by a first floor bridge. The Civic Centre was completed in 1973. The council vacated the Civic Centre in 2022 after purchasing nearby Fountain Court and relocating staff there.

== Coat of arms ==
Middlesbrough’s flag consists of the coat of arms on a red background

The motto Erimus ("We shall be" in Latin) was adopted, it reflects Fuimus ("We have been") of the Bruce clan which were Cleveland's mediaeval lords.

The original arms was granted to the Middlesbrough Rural District in 1911 by William Hylton Dyer Longstaffe. The town's coat of arms were three ships representing shipbuilding and maritime trade and an azure (blue) lion, the latter also from the Bruce clan. It was regranted in 1996 with slight modifications after the dissolution of Cleveland county: a star replaced the middle ship, this is from Captain James Cook's coat of arms.
