= Andy Preston (politician) =

English politician, charity chairman, and businessman

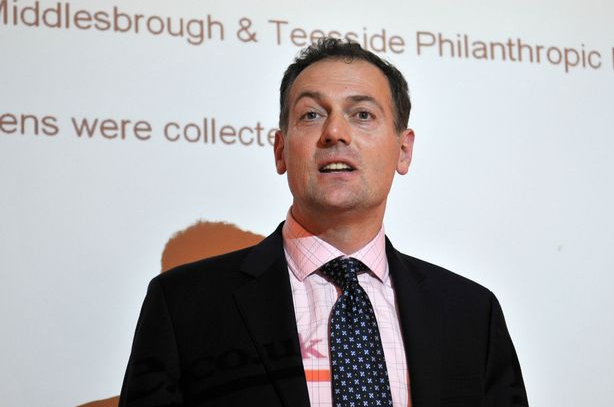

Mayor of Middlesbrough
- In office 6 May 2019 – 8 May 2023
- Deputy: Mieka Smiles (C)
- Preceded by: Dave Budd
- Succeeded by: Chris Cooke

Personal details
- Born: 31 July 1966 (age 60) Middlesbrough, North Yorkshire, England
- Party: Conservative Party (since 2025), Independent (2018-2025), Labour Party (UK) (formerly)
- Education: Edinburgh University
- Occupation: Businessman, charity chairman, Journalist, politician, writer

Andy Preston (born 31 July 1966) is a British politician, charity chairman, businessman, and journalist. He served as Deputy Mayor of Tees Valley for Business Growth from 2019 until 2020 and the directly elected Mayor of Middlesbrough from 2019 until 2023.

== Charity work ==
While working as a fund manager in London and New York, Preston was a patron of international children's charity ARK between 2002 and 2008. H~~e~~ also served as chairman of charity Fairbridge Teesside from 2005 to 2010. The first charity he founded was Middlesbrough and Teesside Philanthropic Foundation in 2011, which raises and distributes funds to boost communities across the urban area of Teesside.

An early supporter and trustee of the charity was public relations executive Mark Bolland The Foundation is supported by a number of local businesses including Middlesbrough Football Club and Steve Gibson's Bulkhaul. It has also won support from Olympic long jumper Chris Tomlinson.

Preston launched a second charity in 2013 to alleviate homelessness and poverty across the UK called CEO Sleepout. The charity raises funds by holding events across the country. In December 2016 Preston launched a charity restaurant, The Fork in the Road, in Middlesbrough, providing employment opportunities for ex-offenders, recovering addicts and the long term unemployed.

Preston previously chaired Tees Valley Education, an academy trust operating in some of the UK's most disadvantaged areas.

== Business career ==
Andy Preston worked as a trader and fund manager, overseeing operations in London and New York. After returning to the North East of England he started investing in a range of commercial property ventures. He has also invested in a number of start-up businesses.

== Political career ==
Andy Preston was historically an active member of the Labour Party, blogging for them and addressing their national conference in 2006 and 2007 respectively. In 2013 he spearheaded a successful campaign to retain the role of elected mayor of Middlesbrough. Preston stood for election as an independent in 2015 to become elected mayor of Middlesbrough, narrowly losing out to Labour's Dave Budd. In 2016 Preston took up a voluntary role as a regional business ambassador for the Britain Stronger in Europe campaign ahead of the referendum to decide whether the country should remain or leave the European Union. After being linked as a potential candidate to become the first Tees Valley Mayor, Preston ruled himself out of the race but warned against the election of a career politician.

Preston was elected as Mayor of Middlesbrough on 2 May 2019, after running as an independent. He won in the first round with 59% (17,418) of the votes counted, with Labour's Mick Thompson coming second with 6,693 votes.

His mayoral policies included making Middlesbrough a hunger free town, where emergency food and help was made available to residents seven days a week. Other notable policies were prioritising the building of social housing on a large scale, crime reduction via a massive roll-out of CCTV and attracting external investment to reverse economic decline. During Preston's tenure as mayor, Middlesbrough garnered recognition in the Financial Times' European Cities and Regions of the Future report, ranking as the third most promising small city in Europe for investment opportunities. Additionally, Preston emphasized tree planting initiatives and their environmental benefits.The successful planting of 10,000 trees led to Middlesbrough being officially designated as a Tree City of the World in 2021.

Preston served as Deputy Mayor of Tees Valley responsible for Business Growth from June 2019 until May 2020.

In a local election held in 2023 he was defeated by the Labour candidate Chris Cooke who won 10,956 votes to Preston's 10,196.

In August 2024, Preston donated to the Conservative Party.

== Personal life ==
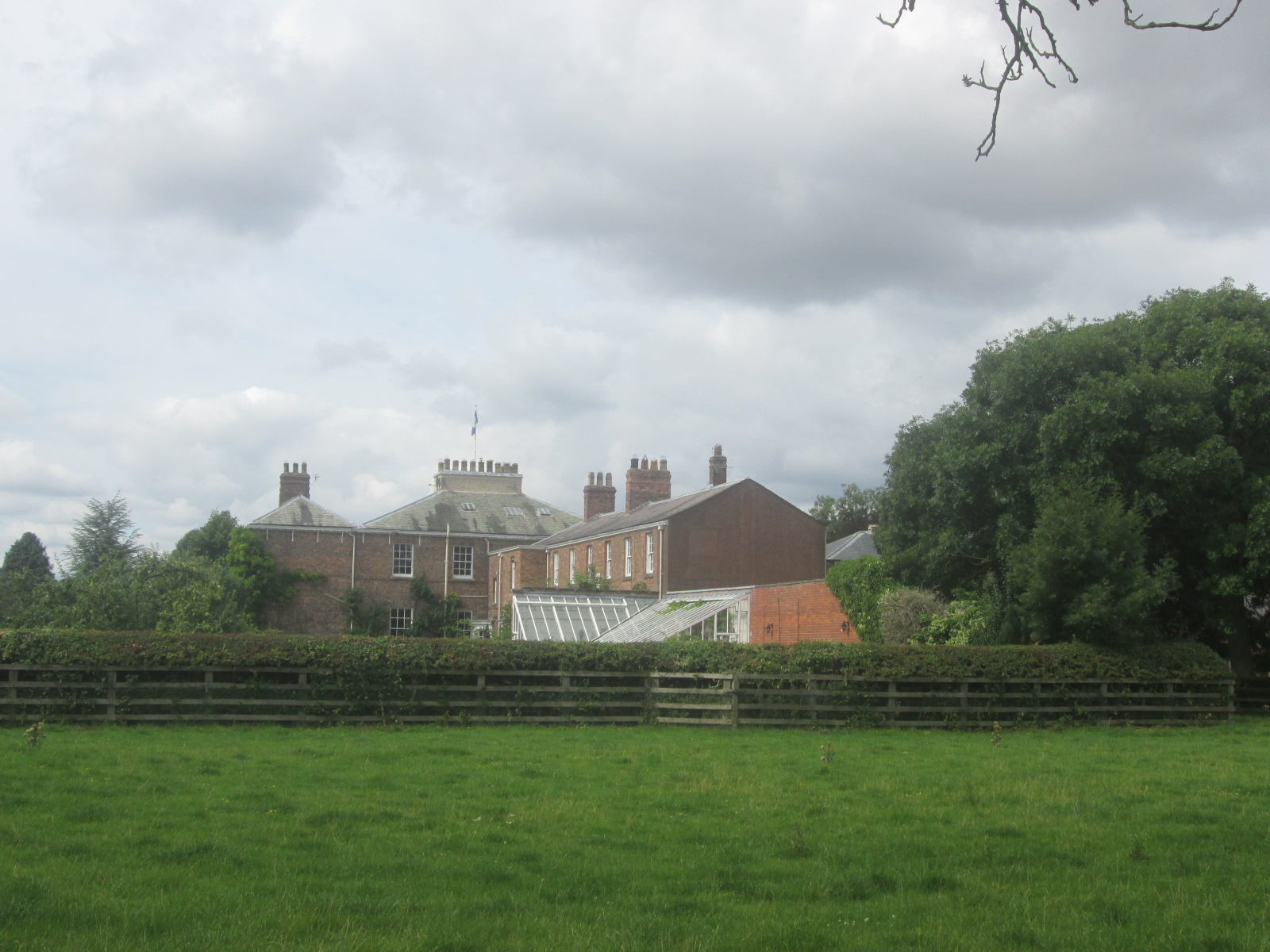
Otterington Hall, Aug 2013.

Preston and his wife have lived at Otterington Hall, a grade II-listed mansion near Northallerton, since at least 2007. It has "one of the best topiary gardens in England and certainly the best in Yorkshire".

Political offices	Mayor of Middlesbrough; 2019 - 2023
