= Mayor of Middlesbrough =

Directly elected mayor of the Middlesbrough

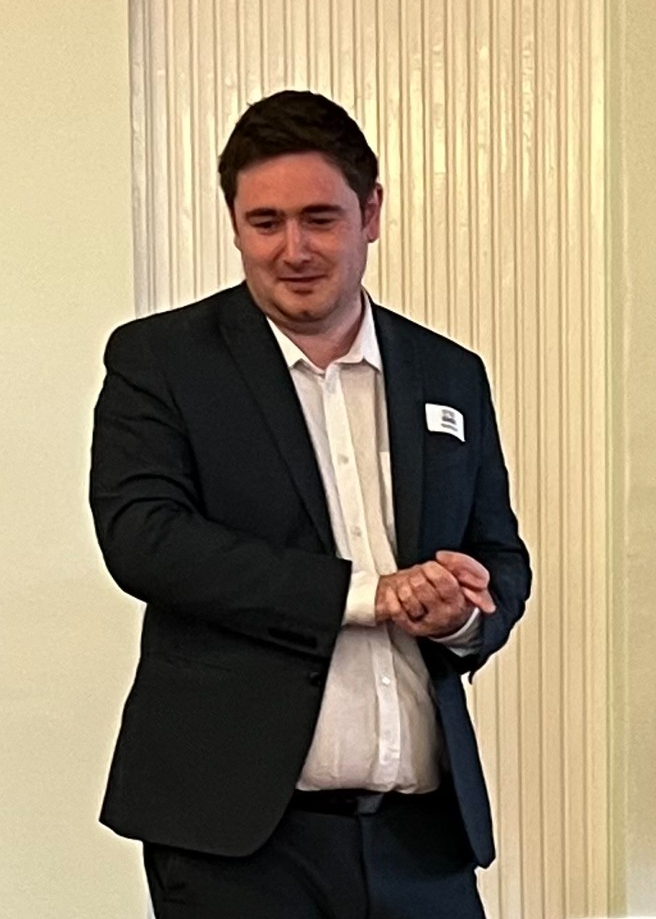
- Incumbent; Chris Cooke since 5 May 2023
- Style: No courtesy title or style
- Appointer: Electorate of Middlesbrough
- Term length: Four years
- Inaugural holder: Ray Mallon

The Mayor of Middlesbrough is the directly elected local authority mayor (executive mayor) of the borough of Middlesbrough in North Yorkshire, England. The incumbent since 2023 is Chris Cooke.

== Referendums ==
=== 2001 ===
Mayor of Middlesbrough Referendum 18 October 2001
Choice	Votes	%
Elected Mayor	29,067	84.00
Cabinet System	5,537	16.00
Total	34,604	100.00
Valid votes	34,604	99.52
Invalid/blank votes	167	0.48
Total votes	34,771	100.00
Registered voters/turnout	101,930	34.11
Source: Local Government Chronicle News

=== 2013 ===
Referendum on how Middlesbrough is governed 26 September 2013
Choice	Votes	%
Elected Mayor	8,674	57.33
Cabinet System	6,455	42.67
Total	15,129	100.00
Valid votes	15,129	99.82
Invalid/blank votes	27	0.18
Total votes	15,156	100.00
Registered voters/turnout	100,629	15.06
Source: Middlesbrough City Council

== Election results ==
=== 2002 ===
Middlesbrough Mayoral Election 2 May 2002
Party	Candidate	1st round		2nd round			1st round votesTransfer votes, 2nd round
Party	Candidate	Total	Of round	Transfers	Total	Of round	1st round votesTransfer votes, 2nd round
Independent	Ray Mallon	26,362	62.8%				
Labour	Sylvia Connolly	9,653	23.0%				
Liberal Democrats	Joseph Michna	3,820	9.1%				
Conservative	Ronald Darby	1,510	3.6%				
Socialist Alliance	Jeffrey Fowler	352	0.8%				
Independent	James Jones	297	0.7%				
Independent win							

=== 2007 ===
Middlesbrough Mayoral Election 3 May 2007
Party	Candidate	1st round		2nd round			1st round votesTransfer votes, 2nd round
Party	Candidate	Total	Of round	Transfers	Total	Of round	1st round votesTransfer votes, 2nd round
Independent	Ray Mallon	17,455	58.7%				
Liberal Democrats	Joseph Michna	7,026	23.6%				
Labour	Charles Rooney	3,539	11.9%				
Conservative	Dorothy Smith	1,833	6.2%				
Turnout		30,779	30.87				
Independent hold							

=== 2011 ===
Middlesbrough Mayoral Election 5 May 2011
Party	Candidate	1st round		2nd round			1st round votesTransfer votes, 2nd round
Party	Candidate	Total	Of round	Transfers	Total	Of round	1st round votesTransfer votes, 2nd round
Independent	Ray Mallon	17,917	50.4%				
Labour	Michael John Carr	11,405	32.1%				
Liberal Democrats	Chris Foote-Wood	3,256	9.2%				
Conservative	Christopher Nolan-Cole	3,001	8.4%				
Turnout		35,579	36.62				
Independent hold							

=== 2015 ===
Middlesbrough Mayoral Election 7 May 2015
Party	Candidate	1st round		2nd round			1st round votesTransfer votes, 2nd round
Party	Candidate	Total	Of round	Transfers	Total	Of round	1st round votesTransfer votes, 2nd round
Labour	Dave Budd	16,680	33.8%	2,858	19,538	50.3%	
Independent	Andy Preston	14,265	28.9%	5,017	19,282	49.7%	
Independent	David Roberts	5,803	11.8%				
Independent	Michael John Carr	5,549	11.2%				
Conservative	Lloyd Cole-Nolan	3,844	7.8%				
Independent	Len Junier	3,207	6.5%				
Turnout		51,427	53.0				
Labour gain from Independent							

=== 2019 ===
Middlesbrough Mayoral Election 2 May 2019
Party	Candidate	1st round		2nd round			1st round votesTransfer votes, 2nd round
Party	Candidate	Total	Of round	Transfers	Total	Of round	1st round votesTransfer votes, 2nd round
Independent	Andy Preston	17,418	59.2%				
Labour	Mick Thompson	6,692	22.7%				
Independent	Gary Badger	2,940	10%				
Conservative	Ken Hall	2,382	8.1%				
Turnout		30,031	31.71				
Independent gain from Labour							

=== 2023 ===
Middlesbrough Mayoral Election 4 May 2023
Party	Candidate	Votes	%	±%
Labour Co-op	Chris Cooke	10,956	40.2	▲17.5
Independent	Andy Preston	10,196	37.4	▼21.8
Independent	Jon Rathmell	3,102	11.4	New
Conservative	John Cooper	2,997	11.0	▲2.9
Turnout		27,479	27.75	▼3.96
Labour Co-op gain from Independent			{{{swing}}}	
