= 2019 Middlesbrough Council election =

2019 UK local government election

- 2 May 2019

All 46 seats to Middlesbrough Council 24 seats needed for a majority

	First party	Second party	Third party
Party	Independent	Labour	Conservative
Last election	9 seats, 23.2%	33 seats, 49.5%	4 seats, 16.9%
Seats won	23	20	3
Seat change	▲14	▼13	▼1
Popular vote	23,447	18,750	6,368
Percentage	43.7%	34.9%	11.9%
Swing	▲20.5%	▼14.6%	▼5.0%
- Map of the results
Council control before election
Labour
Council control after election
No overall control

The 2019 Middlesbrough Council election took place on 2 May 2019 to elect members of Middlesbrough Council in England.

== Summary ==
=== Election result ===
2019 Middlesbrough Council election
Party	Candidates	Seats	Gains	Losses	Net gain/loss	Seats %	Votes %	Votes	+/−
Independent	30	23	15	1	▲14	50.0	43.7	23,447	+20.5
Labour	43	20	0	13	▼13	43.5	34.9	18,750	–14.6
Conservative	26	3	2	3	▼1	6.5	11.9	6,368	–5.0
Liberal Democrats	9	0	0	0	Steady	0.0	3.3	1,772	+2.2
Best for Middlesbrough	7	0	0	0	Steady	0.0	3.2	1,706	N/A
Green	7	0	0	0	Steady	0.0	3.1	1,669	+0.6

== Ward results ==
=== Acklam ===
Acklam
Party	Candidate	Votes	%	±%
Labour	Sheila Dean	527	38.6	
Independent	Eric Polano	518	37.9	
Liberal Democrats	Tom Livingstone	517	37.9	
Labour	Shamal Biswas	487	35.7	
Conservative	Kenneth Hall	325	23.8	
Liberal Democrats	Jack Stoker	271	19.9	
Green	Becky Tyndall	166	12.2	
Majority		1	0.1	
Turnout		1,376	31.0	
Registered electors		4,439		
Labour hold		Swing		
Independent gain from Labour		Swing		

=== Ayresome ===
Ayresome
Party	Candidate	Votes	%	±%
Independent	Antony High	862	63.5	
Labour	Denise Rooney	418	30.8	
Labour	Vic Walkington	323	23.8	
Green	Anya Heywood	138	10.2	
Conservative	Pamela Waterfield	124	9.1	
Liberal Democrats	Sophie Drumm	66	4.9	
Majority		95	7.0	
Turnout		1,372	33.49	
Registered electors		4,097		
Independent gain from Labour		Swing		
Labour hold		Swing		

=== Berwick Hills & Pallister ===
Berwick Hills & Pallister
Party	Candidate	Votes	%	±%
Independent	Lee Garvey	782	62.3	
Independent	Donna Jones	652	51.9	
Independent	Raymond Sands	573	45.6	
Labour	Ian Blades	369	29.4	
Labour	Eddie Dryden	294	23.4	
Labour	Julie McGee	282	22.5	
Conservative	Hannah Clarke	67	5.3	
Conservative	Alison Reynolds	48	3.8	
Majority		204	16.2	
Turnout		1,266	21.58	
Registered electors		5,867		
Independent gain from Labour		Swing		
Independent gain from Labour		Swing		
Independent gain from Labour		Swing		

=== Brambles & Thorntree ===
Brambles & Thorntree
Party	Candidate	Votes	%	±%
Independent	Graham Wilson	519	49.7	
Labour	Geraldine Purvis	302	28.9	
Labour	Janet Thompson	293	28.0	
Best for Middlesbrough	Terry Lawton	249	23.8	
Labour	Daniel Kerr	246	23.5	
Best for Middlesbrough	Kelly Watson	187	17.9	
Best for Middlesbrough	Charmaine Moloney	172	16.5	
Conservative	Hannah Wilson	83	7.9	
Majority		44	4.2	
Turnout		1,055	18.3	
Registered electors		5,766		
Independent gain from Labour		Swing		
Labour hold		Swing		
Labour hold		Swing		

=== Central ===
Central
Party	Candidate	Votes	%	±%
Labour	Linda Lewis	759	46.5	
Labour	Zafar Uddin	712	43.6	
Labour	Matthew Storey	611	37.4	
Independent	Haji Jaber	593	36.3	
Best for Middlesbrough	Paul Kemp	290	17.7	
Best for Middlesbrough	Nicola Fricker	273	16.7	
Best for Middlesbrough	Gordon Walker	259	15.9	
Green	Ian Sturrock	155	9.5	
Liberal Democrats	Paul Hamilton	115	7.0	
Conservative	Stephen Ali	112	6.9	
Majority		18	1.1	
Turnout		1,651	29.57	
Registered electors		5,583		
Labour hold		Swing		
Labour hold		Swing		
Labour hold		Swing		

=== Coulby Newham ===
Coulby Newham
Party	Candidate	Votes	%	±%
Labour	Stefan Walker	857	50.3	
Conservative	David Smith	827	48.5	
Labour	David Branson	696	40.8	
Labour	Alexandra Law	515	30.2	
Majority		181	10.6	
Turnout		1,833	28.71	
Registered electors		6,385		
Labour hold		Swing		
Conservative gain from Labour		Swing		
Labour hold		Swing		

=== Hemlington ===
Hemlington
Party	Candidate	Votes	%	±%
Independent	Allan Bell	454	40.6	
Labour	Jeanette Walker	427	38.2	
Labour	Nicky Walker	422	37.8	
Independent	Ken Walker	365	32.7	
Conservative	Valerie Beadnall	140	12.5	
Conservative	John Cooper	104	9.3	
Majority		5	0.4	
Turnout		1,121	24.94	
Registered electors		4,495		
Independent gain from Labour		Swing		
Labour hold		Swing		

=== Kader ===
Kader
Party	Candidate	Votes	%	±%
Independent	Ron Arundale	1,017	51.0	
Independent	Jim Platt	970	48.6	
Labour	Rahana Islam	428	21.4	
Conservative	Bradley Nicholson	340	17.0	
Labour	Edward Clynch	336	16.8	
Liberal Democrats	Michael Tomlin	131	6.6	
Majority		542	27.2	
Turnout		2,011	45.59	
Registered electors		4,411		
Independent gain from Conservative		Swing		
Independent gain from Labour		Swing		

=== Ladgate ===
Ladgate
Party	Candidate	Votes	%	±%
Labour	June Goodchild	561	53.2	
Labour	Craig Wright	451	42.8	
Conservative	Alison Huggan	367	34.8	
Conservative	Janet Summers	310	29.4	
Majority		84	8.0	
Turnout		1,157	29.37	
Registered electors		3,939		
Labour hold		Swing		
Labour hold		Swing		

=== Linthorpe ===
Linthorpe
Party	Candidate	Votes	%	±%
Labour	Naweed Hussain	639	34.8	
Labour	Philippa Storey	590	32.2	
Independent	Peter Allan	588	32.1	
Independent	George Melville	513	28.0	
Green	Hugh Alberti	218	11.9	
Independent	Craig Jacques	161	8.8	
Conservative	Stephen Armstrong	160	8.7	
Liberal Democrats	Ian Jones	118	6.4	
Majority		2	0.1	
Turnout		1,842	41.53	
Registered electors		4,435		
Labour hold		Swing		
Labour hold		Swing		

=== Longlands & Beechwood ===
Longlands & Beechwood
Party	Candidate	Votes	%	±%
Independent	Joan McTigue	956	60.4	
Labour	Teresa Higgins	503	31.8	
Labour	Mary Nugent	482	30.5	
Labour	Charles Rooney	371	23.5	
Best for Middlesbrough	Cath Taylor	276	17.4	
Conservative	Lenore Sizer	171	10.8	
Majority		111	7.0	
Turnout		1,594	24.5	
Registered electors		6,507		
Independent hold		Swing		
Labour hold		Swing		
Labour hold		Swing		

=== Marton East ===
Marton East
Party	Candidate	Votes	%	±%
Independent	Dorothy Davison	907	56.3	
Independent	Tom Mawston	865	53.7	
Conservative	Edward Davies	318	19.7	
Conservative	Craig Chapman	304	18.9	
Independent	Stephen Hill	254	15.8	
Labour	Mick Bone	207	12.8	
Majority		547	34.0	
Turnout		1,619	36.96	
Registered electors		4,381		
Independent hold		Swing		
Independent hold		Swing		

=== Marton West ===
Marton West
Party	Candidate	Votes	%	±%
Independent	Chris Hobson	1,665	81.5	
Independent	John Hobson	1,588	77.7	
Labour	Stephen Cass	193	9.4	
Conservative	Jill Coleman	190	9.3	
Conservative	Tony Coleman	174	8.5	
Majority		1395	68.3	
Turnout		2,057	47.48	
Registered electors		4,332		
Independent gain from Conservative		Swing		
Independent gain from Conservative		Swing		

=== Newport ===
Newport
Party	Candidate	Votes	%	±%
Labour	Chris Cooke	544	44.3	
Labour	Alma Hellaoui	537	43.7	
Independent	Barrie Cooper	520	42.3	
Labour	John Kabuye	477	38.8	
Green	David Whiteway	205	16.7	
Conservative	Jaime Latham	133	10.8	
Liberal Democrats	Anish Patel	132	10.7	
Majority		43	3.5	
Turnout		1,248	23.75	
Registered electors		5,254		
Labour hold		Swing		
Labour hold		Swing		
Independent gain from Labour		Swing		

=== North Ormesby ===
North Ormesby
Party	Candidate	Votes	%	±%
Independent	Ashley Waters	371	70.0	
Labour	Lewis Young	142	26.8	
Conservative	Kerry Latham	17	3.2	
Majority		229	43.2	
Turnout		537	29.72	
Registered electors		1,807		
Independent gain from Labour		Swing		

=== Nunthorpe ===
Nunthorpe
Party	Candidate	Votes	%	±%
Independent	Jon Rathmell	1,075	59.3	
Conservative	Mieka Smiles	582	32.1	
Independent	Lesley McGloin	573	31.6	
Conservative	Michael King	346	19.1	
Liberal Democrats	Morgan McClintock	284	15.7	
Liberal Democrats	Tom Bailey	138	7.6	
Labour	Bernard Rooney	135	7.5	
Majority		9	0.5	
Turnout		1,823	44.02	
Registered electors		4,141		
Independent hold		Swing		
Conservative gain from Independent		Swing		

=== Park End & Beckfield ===
Park End & Beckfield
Party	Candidate	Votes	%	±%
Independent	Brian Hubbard	1,050	73.9	
Independent	Mick Saunders	979	68.9	
Independent	Jan Mohan	910	64.0	
Labour	Dennis Burns	178	12.5	
Labour	Jenny Dowsett	118	8.3	
Labour	Paul McGrath	117	8.2	
Conservative	Mary Davies	46	3.2	
Majority		732	51.5	
Turnout		1,427	25.03	
Registered electors		5,701		
Independent hold		Swing		
Independent hold		Swing		
Independent hold		Swing		

=== Park ===
Park
Party	Candidate	Votes	%	±%
Labour	Julia Rostron	984	44.7	
Labour	Theo Furness	883	40.2	
Independent	Chris McIntyre	816	37.1	
Labour	Margaret Walters	814	37.0	
Green	Emma Alberti	695	31.6	
Conservative	Deborah Wardle	337	15.3	
Majority		2	0.1	
Turnout		2,234	33.52	
Registered electors		6,664		
Labour hold		Swing		
Labour hold		Swing		
Independent gain from Labour		Swing		

=== Stainton & Thornton ===
Stainton & Thornton
Party	Candidate	Votes	%	±%
Conservative	David Coupe	618	80.4	
Labour	James Sheldon	151	19.6	
Majority		467	60.7	
Turnout		804	34.94	
Registered electors		2,301		
Conservative hold		Swing		

=== Trimdon ===
Trimdon
Party	Candidate	Votes	%	±%
Independent	Carolyn Dodds	1,216	74.5	
Independent	Dennis McCabe	1,135	69.5	
Labour	Jean Sharrocks	197	12.1	
Labour	Peter Sharrocks	172	10.5	
Conservative	Dorothy Smith	125	7.7	
Green	Barry Jobson	92	5.6	
Majority		938	57.4	
Turnout		1,645	39.12	
Registered electors		4,205		
Independent gain from Labour		Swing		
Independent hold		Swing		

== Changes 2019–2023 ==
- 7 July 2020: Stefan Walker (Labour, Coulby Newham) left the party to sit as an independent, later joining the Middlesbrough Independent Group.
- 6 August 2020: June Goodchild (Labour, Ladgate) left the party to join the Middlesbrough Independent Group.
- May 2021: Jon Rathmell (Independent, Nunthorpe) was given a two-year conditional discharge at Teesside Crown Court after pleading guilty to misconduct in public office over the misrepresentation of emails and an invoice relating to a fireworks display; he had already been expelled from the Middlesbrough Independent Councillors Association following his guilty plea the previous month.
- 29 March 2022: Antony High (Independent, Ayresome), leader of the Middlesbrough Independent Group and former deputy mayor, joined the Labour Party.

=== By-elections ===
==== Park End & Beckfield ====
Park End & Beckfield: 4 July 2019
Party	Candidate	Votes	%	±%
Independent	Stephen Hill	511	52.9	
Independent	Steven James	303	31.4	
Labour	Paul McGrath	115	11.9	
Conservative	Valerie Beadnall	23	2.4	
Liberal Democrats	Ian Jones	13	1.3	
Majority		208	21.6	
Turnout		970	17.0	
Registered electors		5,696		
Independent hold				

The by-election was held following the resignation of independent councillor Jan Mohan, who stood down as executive member for children's services and as ward councillor for health reasons, days after being appointed to the mayor's cabinet in May 2019.

==== Coulby Newham ====
Coulby Newham: 20 February 2020
Party	Candidate	Votes	%	±%
Conservative	Luke Mason	689	49.0	
Labour	Alexandra Law	279	19.9	
Liberal Democrats	Thomas Carney	259	18.4	
Independent	Elisha Lowther	90	6.4	
Independent	Ian Morrish	88	6.3	
Majority		410	29.2	
Turnout		1,407	21.6	
Registered electors		6,515		
Conservative hold				

The by-election was held after Conservative councillor David Smith resigned in January 2020, having not attended a council meeting since July 2019, shortly before he would have faced automatic disqualification under the Local Government Act 1972.

==== Ladgate ====
Ladgate: 16 September 2021
Party	Candidate	Votes	%	±%
Independent	Tony Grainge	362	34.8	N/A
Conservative	Lee Holmes	315	30.3	−9.3
Labour	Michael Thompson	226	21.7	−38.7
Independent	Sharon Platt	121	11.6	N/A
Liberal Democrats	Paul Hamilton	14	1.3	N/A
Independent	Victoria Hoban	3	0.3	N/A
Majority		47	4.5	
Turnout		1,041	25.8	
Independent gain from Labour		Swing	▲22.1	

The by-election was held following the death of independent councillor June Goodchild on 6 July 2021. Goodchild had been elected as a Labour councillor in 2019 before joining the Middlesbrough Independent Group.

==== North Ormesby ====
North Ormesby: 16 December 2021
Party	Candidate	Votes	%	±%
Labour	Nicky Gascoigne	172	74.5	+47.7
Independent	Mark Horkan	32	13.9	N/A
Conservative	Val Beadnall	20	8.7	+5.5
Liberal Democrats	Ian Jones	7	3.0	N/A
Majority		140	60.6	
Turnout		231	13.3	
Labour gain from Independent		Swing	▲16.9	

The by-election was held following the resignation of independent councillor Ashley Waters in November 2021, after he faced criticism over spending time renovating a château in France and calls to resign from the mayor and the opposition Labour group leader.

==== Berwick Hills and Pallister ====
Berwick Hills and Pallister: 30 June 2022
Party	Candidate	Votes	%	±%
Labour	Ian Blades	361	56.8	+26.5
Independent	Steven James	204	32.1	New
Conservative	John Cooper	53	8.3	+2.8
Liberal Democrats	Sophie Drumm	11	1.7	New
Green	Annette Fermin	7	1.1	New
Majority		157	24.7	
Turnout		636	11.1	
Labour gain from Independent		Swing	▲29.3	

The by-election was held following the resignation of independent councillor Lee Garvey in April 2022, a week after his application to join the Labour Party was rejected amid allegations concerning historical social media posts.
