= Borough of Middlesbrough =

District in North Yorkshire, England

- Local authority district
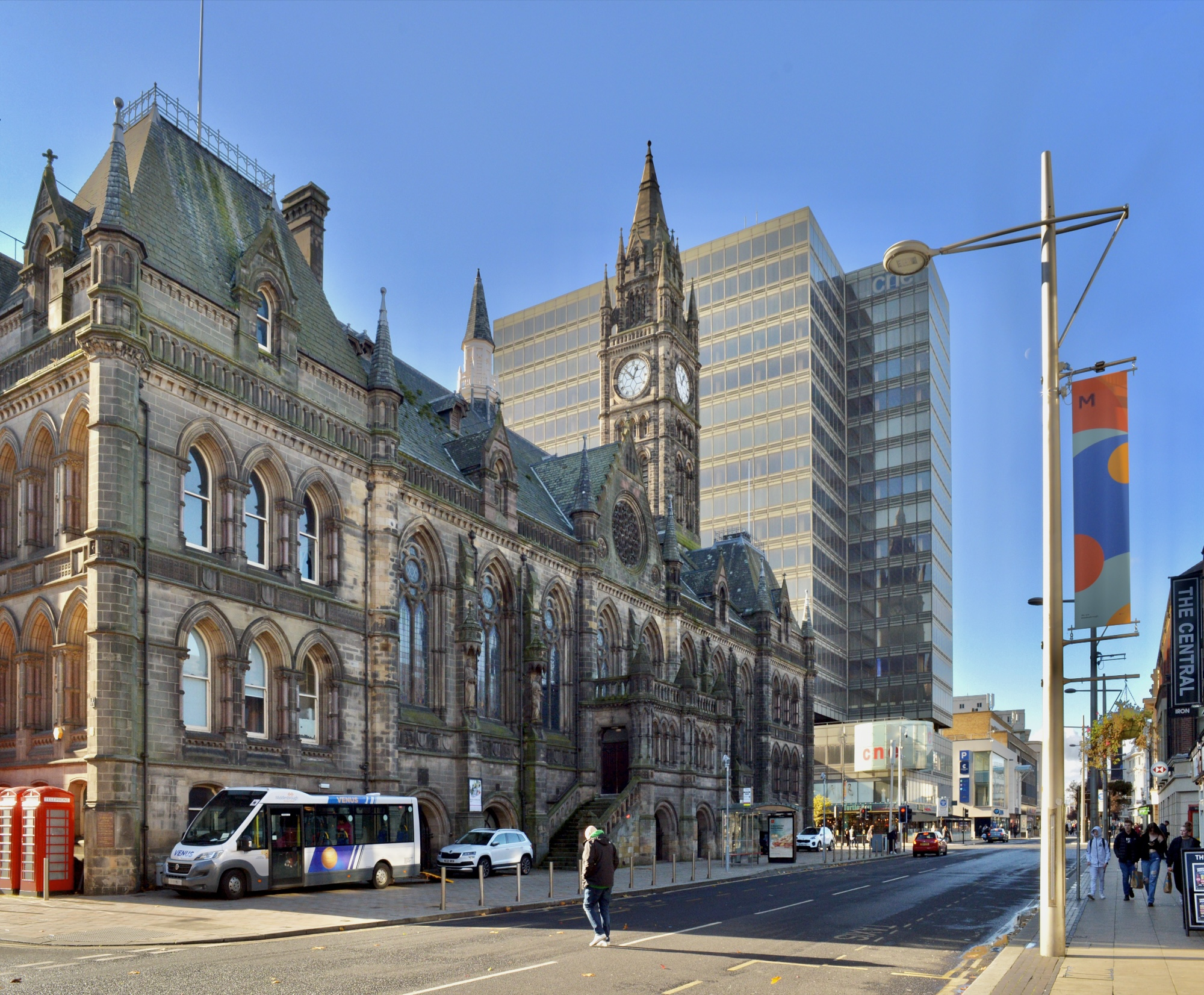
- Middlesbrough Town Hall

- Coat of arms
- Motto: Latin: Erimus, lit. 'we shall be'
- Middlesbrough shown within North Yorkshire
- Coordinates: 54.5757°N 1.2340°W
- Sovereign state: United Kingdom
- Country: England
- Region: North East
- Ceremonial county: North Yorkshire
- City region: Tees Valley
- Incorporated: 1 April 1974
- Unitary authority: 1 April 1996
- Named for: Middlesbrough
- Administrative HQ: Fountain Court, Middlesbrough

Government
  - Type: Unitary authority
  - Body: Middlesbrough Council
  - Executive: Mayor and cabinet
  - Control: Labour
  - Elected Mayor: Chris Cooke (L)
  - Chair: Jack Banks
  - MPs: 2 MPs: Andy McDonald (L); Luke Myer (L)

Area
  - Total: 21 sq mi (54 km^{2})
  - Rank: 241st

Population (2025)
  - Total: 152,795
  - Rank: 147th
  - Density: 7,350/sq mi (2,836/km^{2})

Ethnicity (2021)
  - Ethnic groups: List: 82.4% White; 10.5% Asian; 2.7% Black; 2.4% other; 2.1% Mixed

Religion (2021)
  - Religion: List: 46.0% Christianity; 36.4% no religion; 10.2% Islam; 1.0% Hinduism; 0.4% Sikhism; 0.3% Buddhism; 0.0% Judaism; 0.3% other; 5.3% not stated
- Time zone: UTC+0 (GMT)
  - Summer (DST): UTC+1 (BST)
- Postcode areas: TS1–5, TS7–8
- Dialling codes: 01642
- ISO 3166 code: GB-MDB
- GSS code: E06000002
- Website: middlesbrough.gov.uk

The Borough of Middlesbrough is a district in the ceremonial county of North Yorkshire, England. It is part of the Tees Valley region, along with the boroughs of Stockton-on-Tees, Redcar and Cleveland, Hartlepool and Darlington. The district covers the town of Middlesbrough, Nunthorpe civil parish and Stainton and Thornton civil parish. Since its creation in 1974, it has had borough status and the governing Middlesbrough Council became a unitary authority in 1996.

== History ==
The borough was preceded by the County Borough of Teesside in the North Riding of Yorkshire, having previously been an independent municipal borough from 1853 to 1968. The current borough boundaries were formed on 1 April 1974, by the creation of a new non-metropolitan district of the new county of Cleveland by the Local Government Act 1972, covering the part of the County Borough of Teesside not allocated to other districts along with the parish of Nunthorpe from Stokesley Rural District. It was reconstituted as a unitary authority, alongside the abolition of Cleveland, on 1 April 1996. For ceremonial purposes it is part of North Yorkshire, though certain local services are still aligned to 1974 boundaries, including Cleveland Fire Brigade and Police. It is included within the Tees Valley Combined Authority area for devolved transport and economic governance.

County			Borough/ district			
Name	Type	Dependent	Type	From	Until	Notes
Yorkshire	Historic	check	Municipal borough	1853	1889	
North Riding of Yorkshire	Administrative	X mark	County borough	1889	1968	Merged into Teesside CB in 1968
Cleveland (county town)	Non-metropolitan	check	Non-metropolitan district	1974	1996	
North Yorkshire	Ceremonial	X mark	Unitary authority	1996		

== Areas of the borough ==
The borough contains the following areas:

- Acklam
- Ayresome
- Berwick Hills
- Brambles Farm
- Coulby Newham
- Easterside
- Grove Hill
- Hemlington
- Linthorpe
- Middlehaven
- Nunthorpe
- Ormesby
- Pallister
- Stainton
- Saltersgill
- Thornton
- Thorntree
- Tollesby
- Whinney Banks

== Structure ==
The borough is made up of 20 council wards within the borough of Middlesbrough. There are 19 non-statutory community councils. There are also two statutory parish councils for "Nunthorpe" and "Stainton and Thornton". East, north and west Middlesbrough as well as parts of Park End-and-Beckfield, Berwick-Hils-and-Pallister and Ladgate are covered by the Middlesbrough parliamentary constituency. South Middlesbrough as well as the other parts of the wards are covered by the Middlesbrough South and East Cleveland parliamentary constituency.

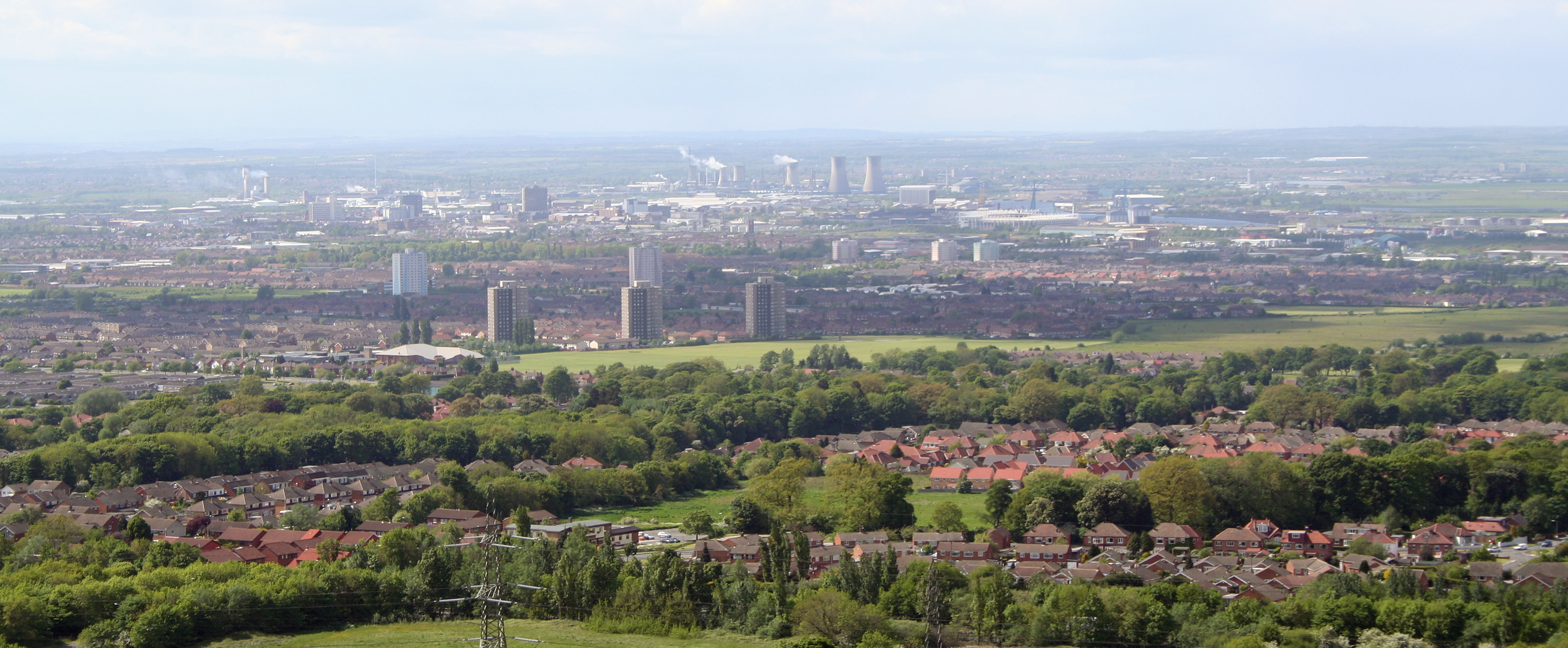
Skyline of Middlesbrough

1	Acklam (W)
2	Aryesome (W)
3	Longlands and Beechwood (N)
4	Berwick Hills and Pallister (E)
5	Brambles and Thorntree (E)
6	Central (N)
7	Kader (W)

8	Ladgate (W)
9	Linthorpe (N)
10	Newport (N)
11	North Ormesby (E)
12	Park (N)
13	Park End and Beckfield (E)
14	Trimdon (W)

15	Coulby Newham (S)
16	Hemlington (S)
17	Marton East (S)
18	Marton West (S)
19	Nunthorpe (S)
20	Stainton and Thornton (S)

The council operates a with directly elected Mayor of Middlesbrough. The political composition of the council, as of the May 2019 local election, is Independent 23, Labour 20; and Conservative 3.

Political party make-up of Middlesbrough Borough Council
Party	Seats	Current council
Independent	23	
Labour	20	
Conservative	3	

Teesside International Airport (formerly known as Durham Tees Valley Airport), is joint owned by the borough and the other four Tees Valley councils The council also owns multiple buildings in the borough.

== Mayor ==
The first ten mayors of Middlesbrough
Year	Name of Mayor
1853	Henry Bolckow
1854	Isaac Wilson
1855	John Vaughan
1856	Henry Thompson
1858	John Richardson
1859	William Fallows
1860	George Bottomley
1861	James Harris
1862	Thomas Brentnall
1863	Edgar Gilkes

The first directly elected mayors of Middlesbrough
Years	Name of Mayor
2002–2015	Ray Mallon
2015–2019	Dave Budd
2019–2023	Andy Preston
2023–	Chris Cooke

The first mayor of Middlesbrough was the German-born Henry Bolckow in 1853. In the 20th century, encompassing introduction of universal suffrage in 1918 and changes in local government in the United Kingdom, the role of mayor changed and became largely ceremonial.

In 2001, as part of a wider programme of devolution, voters in Middlesbrough were offered a referendum to decide between a directly elected mayor or the cabinet system then in operation, with the traditional civic and ceremonial functions of the Mayors being transferred to the Chair of Middlesbrough Council, which they did so by a large margin.

In 2002, Ray Mallon (Independent), formerly a senior officer in Cleveland Police, became Middlesbrough's first directly elected mayor. He was re-elected in 2007 and then in 2011. Mallon chose not to stand for a fourth term in 2015 and his deputy mayor, Dave Budd (Labour) was elected to succeed him. Budd decided not to stand for a second term and in the May 2019 mayoral election, local businessman Andy Preston (independent) won with 59% of the vote.

== Demography ==
=== Borough ===
The borough of Middlesbrough's total resident population was 152,795, by the 2025 The population of Middlesbrough as a county borough peaked at almost 165,000 in the late 1960s, however this has declined since the early 1980s before starting to recover in the 2010s.

Women in the former Middlehaven ward (absorbed into the central ward) had the second lowest life expectancy at birth, 74 years, of any ward in England and Wales in 2016. In the borough of Middlesbrough, 14.0% of the population were non-white British in 2011.

Ethnic Group	Year							
Ethnic Group	1961 estimates		2001 census		2011 census		2021 census	
Ethnic Group	Number	%	Number	%	Number	%	Number	%
White: Total	155,861	99.03%	126,399	93.7%	122,055	88.2%	118,547	82.4%
White: British	–	–	124,532	92.3%	119,106	86.1%	114,421	79.5%
White: Irish	–	–	726		574		434	
White: Roma	–	–					320	
White: Gypsy or Irish Traveller	–	–			85		160	
White: Other	–	–	1,141		2,290		3,212	
Asian or Asian British: Total	–	–	6,415	4.7%	10,768	7.8%	15,090	10.5%
Asian or Asian British: Indian	–	–	846		1,477		2,804	
Asian or Asian British: Pakistani	–	–	4,839	3.6%	6,811		8,990	6.2%
Asian or Asian British: Bangladeshi	–	–	77		244		595	
Asian or Asian British: Chinese	–	–	263		904		669	
Asian or Asian British: Other Asian	–	–	390		1,332		2,032	
Black or Black British: Total	–	–	477		1,731		3,816	2.7%
Black or Black British: African	–	–	303		1,470		3,339	
Black or Black British: Caribbean	–	–	128		92		162	
Other Black	–	–	46		169		315	
Mixed or British Mixed: Total	–	–	1,269		2,362		3,001	
Mixed: White and Black Caribbean	–	–	317		541		570	
Mixed: White and Black African	–	–	208		452		650	
Mixed: White and Asian	–	–	475		904		1,110	
Mixed: Other Mixed	–	–	269		465		671	
Other: Total	–	–	295		1,496		3,468	
Other: Arab	–	–	–	–	950		1,452	
Other: Any other ethnic group	–	–	295		546		2,016	
Non-White: Total	1,534	0.97%	8,456		16,357		25,375	
Total	157,395	100%	134,855	100%	138,412	100%	143,922	100%

== Economy ==
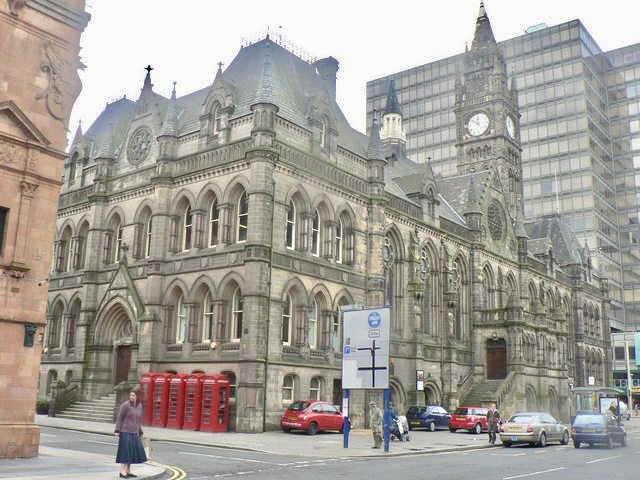
Middlesbrough Town Hall, Albert Street

This is a chart of trend of regional gross value added of Middlesbrough at current basic prices published (pp. 240–253) by Office for National Statistics with figures in millions of British Pounds Sterling.

Year	Regional Gross Value Added^{4}	Agriculture^{1}	Industry^{2}	Services^{3}
1995	1,115	8	377	729
2000	1,192	6	417	768
2003	1,538	6	561	971

^1 includes hunting and forestry

^2 includes energy and construction

^3 includes financial intermediation services indirectly measured

^4 Components may not sum to totals due to rounding

== Freedom of the Borough ==
The following people and military units have received the Freedom of the Borough of Middlesbrough.

=== Individuals ===
- Joseph Calvert: 7 November 1919.
- L. Taylor – 30 March 1967 (deceased 23 May 1983)
- Monsignor Canon M O'Sullivan – 26 March 1968 (deceased 6 May 1978)
- Mary A. Daniel – 16 October 1974 (deceased 23 December 1983)
- Ethel A. Gaunt – 16 October 1974 (deceased 10 June 1990)
- Lord Bottomley of Middlesbrough in the County of Cleveland – 21 December 1976 (deceased 3 November 1995)
- E. A. Dickinson – 8 May 1981 (deceased 2001)
- Rose M. Haston – 9 May 1986 (deceased 22 January 1991)
- Arthur Pearson – 9 May 1986 (deceased 23 February 1997)
- Robert I. Smith – 9 May 1986 (deceased 23 February 1993)
- W. Ferrier – 16 June 1992 (deceased 4 March 2015)
- G. Popple – 16 June 1992 (deceased 10 May 2003)
- Len Poole – 16 June 1992 (deceased 15 May 2011)
- John Robert Foster – 8 March 1996 (deceased 12 May 2022)
- Alma Collin – 15 March 2000 (deceased 2014)
- Hazel Pearson – 3 December 2003 (deceased 5 February 2016)
- Steve Gibson – 18 March 2004
- Jack Hatfield – 30 June 2009 (deceased January 2014)
- Mackenzie Thorpe – 11 April 2019
- Gareth Southgate - 28 July 2021.

=== Military units ===
- The Green Howards: 13 May 1944, transferred to the Yorkshire Regiment: 25 October 2006.
- The 34th (Northern) Signal Regiment (Volunteers): 16 May 1969 (by the County Borough of Teesside; transferred to Middlesbrough in 1974).
- HMS Marlborough, RN: 15 March 2000.
