= Smurthwaite =

Smurthwaite is an English surname that may refer to the following notable people:

- James Smurthwaite (1916–1989), English first-class cricketer
- Kate Smurthwaite, British comedian and political activist
- Norman Smurthwaite (born 1960), English businessman and former football club chairman
