= Stainton and Thornton =

Civil parish in North Yorkshire, England

Coordinates: 54.5191°N 1.2603°W

- Civil parish
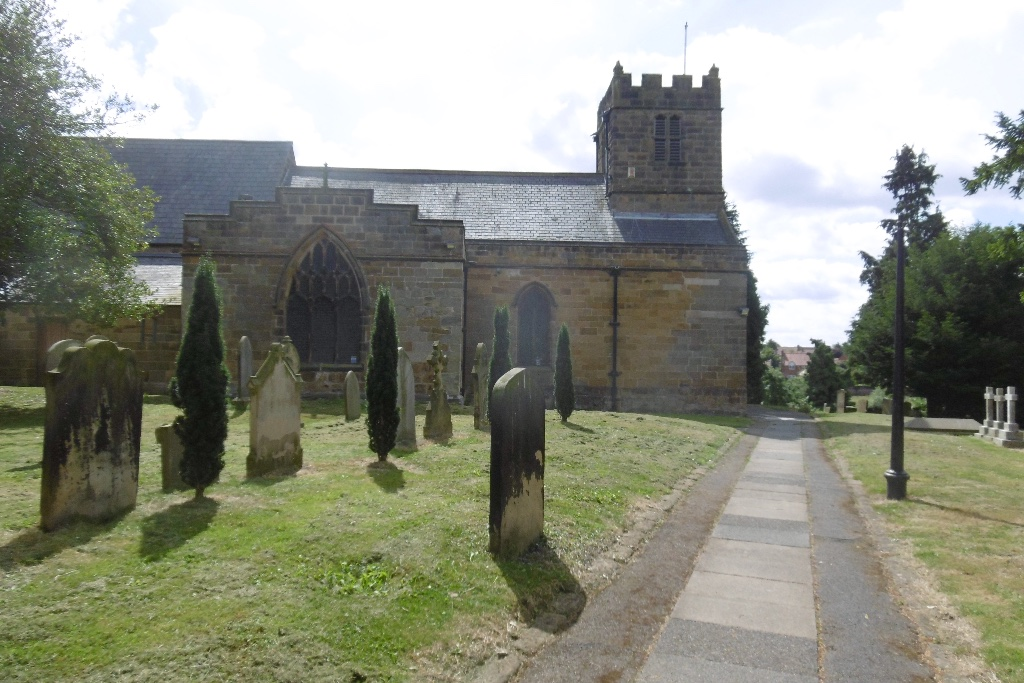
- St Peter and St Paul Church, Stainton

- Population: 1,243 (2011 census)
- OS grid reference: NZ478140
- Civil parish: Stainton and Thornton
- Unitary authority: Middlesbrough
- Ceremonial county: North Yorkshire
- Region: North East
- Country: England
- Sovereign state: United Kingdom
- Post town: MIDDLESBROUGH
- Postcode district: TS8
- Police: Cleveland
- Fire: Cleveland
- Ambulance: North East

Stainton and Thornton is a civil parish in Middlesbrough, North Yorkshire, England. It consists of the two villages Stainton and Thornton. The population of the civil parish at the 2011 census was 1,243.

== History ==
The ancient parish of Stainton (also known as Stainton-in-Cleveland) formed by the split of the Soke of Acklam with Acklam taking Middlesbrough and Linthorpe while Stainton took Coulby (west side of Coulby Newham), Hemlington, Ingleby Barwick, Maltby, Stainsby and Thornaby. Each area had gained separate parishes by the time the now civil parish of Stainton was temporarily abolished in 1968 with the creation of the Teesside civil parish. In 1986, a new parish was formed called Stainton and Thornton from the remaining area of the former Stainton parish; part of the former parish was given to Maltby in 1968.
