= Hemlington =

Area of Middlesbrough, North Yorkshire, England

Coordinates: 54.524°N 1.239°W

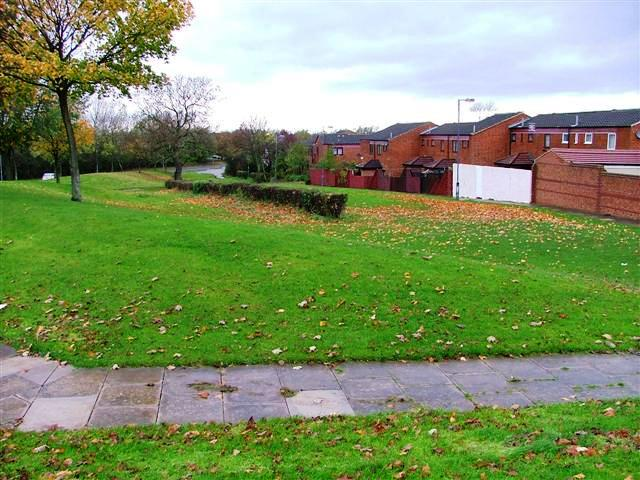

- Location within North Yorkshire
- Population: 5,900 (2012)
- OS grid reference: NZ49381452
- Unitary authority: Middlesbrough
- Ceremonial county: North Yorkshire
- Region: North East
- Country: England
- Sovereign state: United Kingdom
- Post town: MIDDLESBROUGH
- Postcode district: TS8
- Dialling code: 01642
- Police: Cleveland
- Fire: Cleveland
- Ambulance: North East
- UK Parliament: Middlesbrough South and East Cleveland

Hemlington is an area of Middlesbrough, North Yorkshire, England. It is centred around a lake and is in the Borough of Middlesbrough's south-western outskirts.

In 2015, the Hemlington Ward had a population of 6,557, 4.74% of Middlesbrough's resident population. It is east of the Stainton and Thornton parish and partly in the parish's namesake ward: it is also west Coulby Newham.

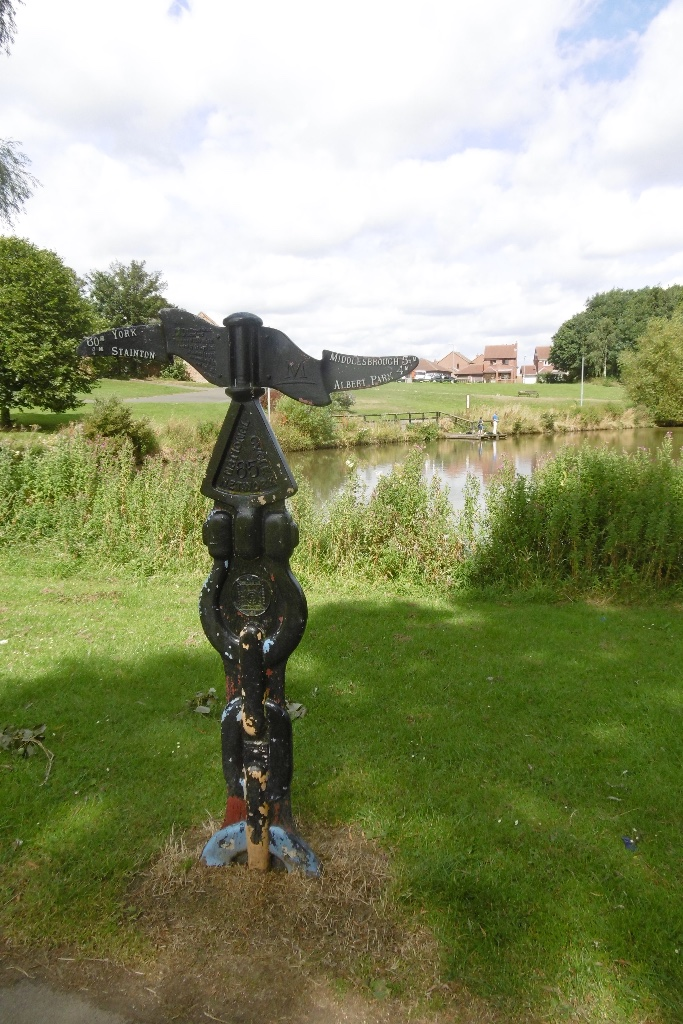
Hemlington Lake

== History ==
A local hospital was set in the countryside until the late 1980s when it was closed and later demolished: it had been built in 1895 as an infectious control hospital but then during the wars was used for treatment of war injuries.

Hemlington was built on farmland during the 1960s and expanded thereafter to provide affordable housing for the increasing population of Middlesbrough.

Hemlington was formerly a township in the parish of Stainton, in 1866 Hemlington became a separate civil parish, on 1 April 1968 the parish was abolished to form Teesside. In 1961 the parish had a population of 285. Until 1974 it was in the North Riding of Yorkshire, from 1974 to 1996 it was in Cleveland.

== Local facilities and amenities ==
The main shopping centre is Viewley Hill Shopping Centre. The Parkway Centre, with facilities including a leisure centre, fast food restaurants, and DIY stores is in nearby Coulby Newham.

The 'Initiative Centre' is an adult education and job resource training centre for skills training and getting people back to employment.

Hemlington local leisure amenities are mostly centred on a 39 acres (160,000 m^{2}) area of open parkland which has been split into two sites: Hemlington Recreation Centre and Hemlington Hall Farm.The farm outbuildings are used as a drop in facility for the 'Linx' detached youth work project, and provide changing facilities for football pitches, canoe and kayak storage areas, and a small classroom. 'The Unicorn Centre' is horse-riding centre for disabled people. The recreation centre includes an activity hall, with classes for children and adults, a small gym, and outdoor leisure facilities.

The wildlife of Hemlington Lake includes kingfishers, mute swans, tufted and ruddy ducks, seasonal visitors, and a population of watervoles. The Bluebell Beck Woodland Walk, around the lake, includes both metal and chainsaw sculptures. In 2010 Charles, Prince of Wales visited the lake. Hemlington Lake and Recreation Centre has Green Flag Award.

== Education and religion ==
The four churches in and around Hemlington are St Timothy's Church of England, Providence Baptist Church, All Nations Church which is an Assemblies of God church, and the Middlesbrough St Mary's RC Cathedral in Coulby Newham. Each provide services and local community groups.

Hemlington has three primary schools: Viewley Hill Primary School, Hemlington Hall Primary School and St. Gerard's RC Primary School.

== Transport and geography ==
The main transport from Hemlington is a public bus service operated by Stagecoach. The nearest railway station is 3 miles (5 km) away in Nunthorpe. Coulby Newham lies of the east of suburb and the village Stainton west with Stainton and Thornton parish and ward south and west of Hemlington.
