= Thornton, Middlesbrough =

Village in North Yorkshire, England

Coordinates: 54.51503°N 1.26200°W

Thornton
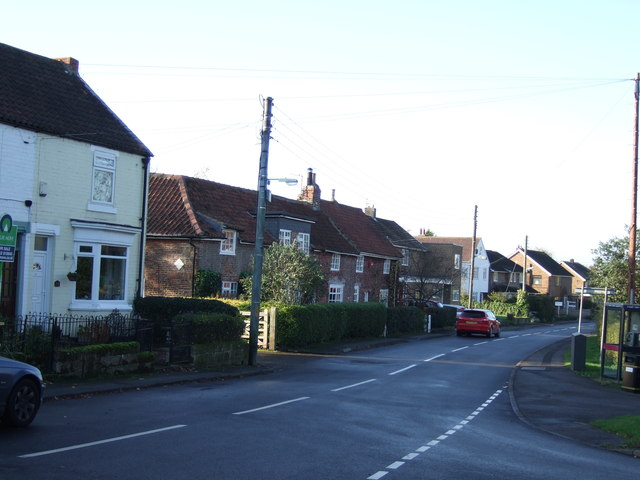
- Maltby Road, Thornton

- Location within North Yorkshire
- OS grid reference: NZ478135
- Civil parish: Stainton and Thornton
- Unitary authority: Middlesbrough
- Ceremonial county: North Yorkshire
- Region: North East
- Country: England
- Sovereign state: United Kingdom
- Post town: MIDDLESBROUGH
- Postcode district: TS8
- Police: Cleveland
- Fire: Cleveland
- Ambulance: North East

Thornton is a village near Stainton in the town of Middlesbrough, in the borough of Middlesbrough and the ceremonial county of North Yorkshire, England. It is in the local Stainton and Thornton ward of Middlesbrough, with a collective population of 2,300 as of 2005.
