= Harry Allport =

English footballer

Personal information
- Full name: Henry George Allport
- Date of birth: 1873
- Place of birth: North Ormesby, England
- Position: Wing half

Senior career*
Years	Team	Apps	(Gls)
1893–1894	Middlesbrough Ironopolis	21	(1)
1899–1900	Middlesbrough	31	(0)
- * Club domestic league appearances and goals

Henry George Allport (born 1873) was an English professional footballer who played as a wing half. He played in the Football League for Middlesbrough and Middlesbrough Ironopolis. He is the only footballer to play for Middlesbrough and Ironopolis. He played in the 1895 and 1898 F.A. Amateur Cup Final's both won by Middlesbrough against Old Carthusians and Uxbridge. He was registered as a player for Middlesbrough from 1895 until 1900.
