= Park End, Middlesbrough =

Area of Middlesbrough, North Yorkshire, England

Coordinates: 54.552°N 1.197°W

Park End is an area in the borough of Middlesbrough, North Yorkshire, England. It is near Berwick Hills and Ormesby. It is in the TS3 postcode district.

The population of the Park End ward, at the 2011 Census, was 6,254. In May 2015 the ward boundaries changed, the new Park End and Beckfield ward replacing the old ward in name. The ward is in the Middlesbrough constituency, the former ward was in the Middlesbrough South and East Cleveland constituency.

== Schools ==
There are two primary schools in Park End.

=== Park End Primary School ===
Park End Primary school is much larger than the average-sized primary school. Almost all pupils are of White British heritage. The proportion of pupils known to be eligible extra funding because they come from low-income households is well-above average. The proportion of pupils given extra support at school because of low attainment is above average. There is a breakfast club and many lunchtime and after-school clubs which are managed by the headteacher and run voluntarily by the school staff. The school meets the government's minimum expectations for pupils’ attainment and progress.

=== St Pius X Primary School ===
St Pius X is a smaller than average-sized primary school, which caters for the Catholic community in Park End.. The proportion of pupils supported through school action is below average. The proportion of children who need support for learning from outside agencies is broadly in line with the national average. A well-above average proportion of pupils is known to be eligible for extra funding because they are eligible for free school meals, are from service families, or are those children that are looked after. Most pupils are from White British communities with a significantly lower than average proportion of pupils from minority ethnic groups. The school meets the government's current floor standards for minimum expectations for pupils’ attainment and progress. The school extends its services providing a breakfast-club each day.

== Famous people ==
- Steve Gibson - Politician and Entrepreneur
- Chris Kamara - Professional Football Player
