= Newham Grange Leisure Farm =

Conservation centre in North Yorkshire, England

Coordinates: 54.531°N 1.221°W

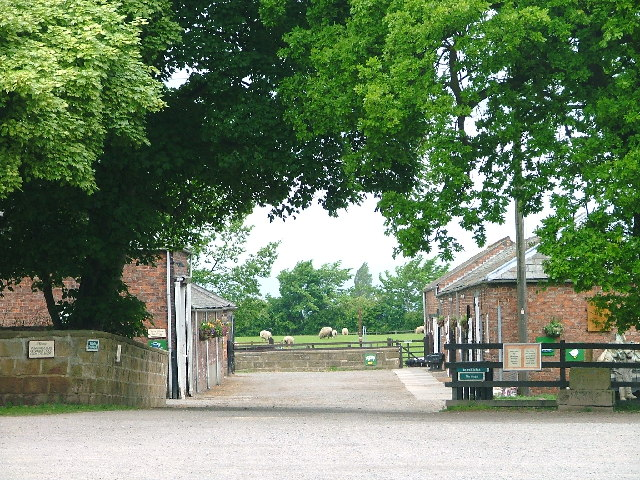
Entrance to Newham Grange Leisure Farm

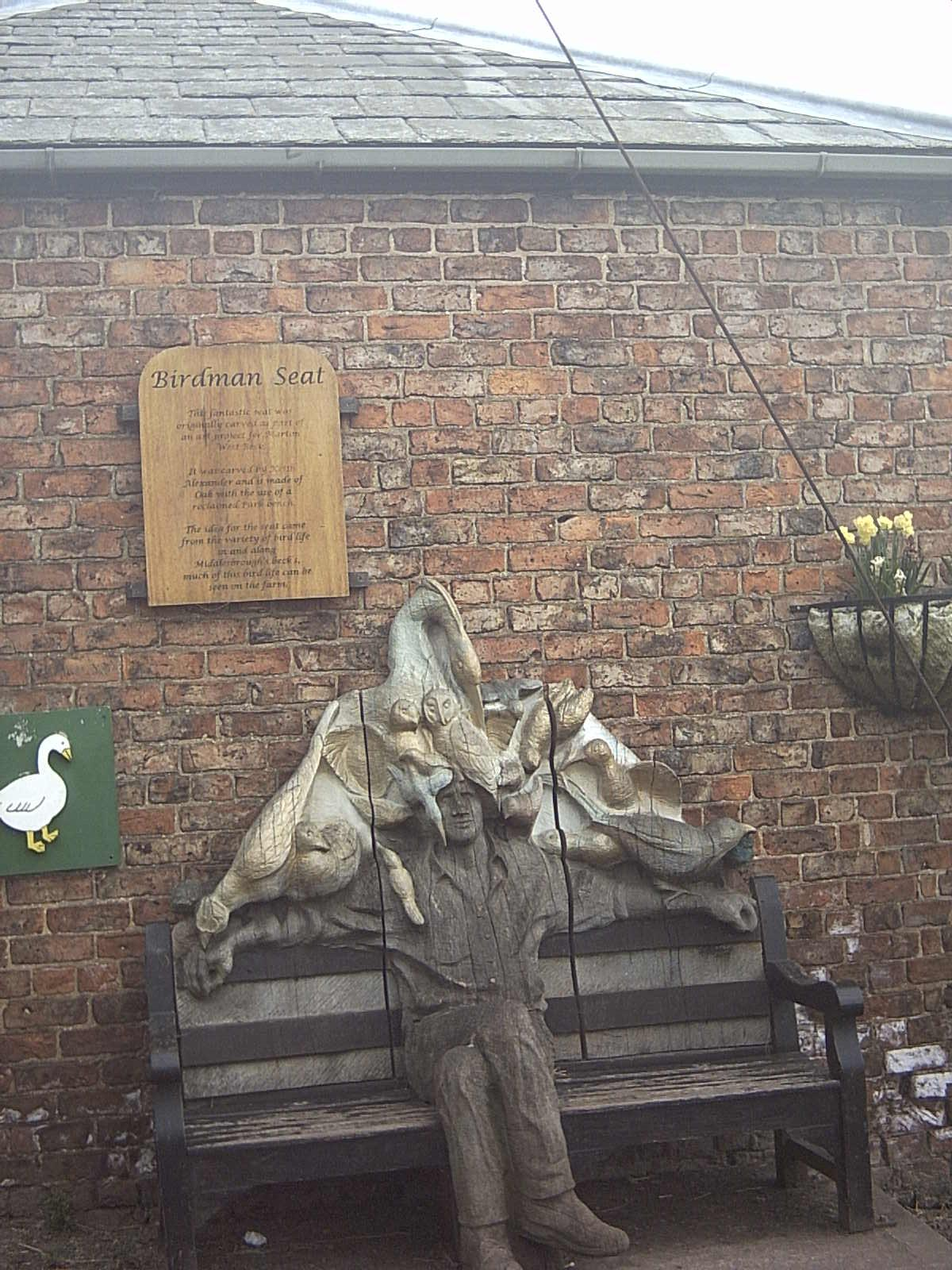
Birdman Seat.

Newham Grange Country Farm (also known as Newham Grange Leisure Farm) is a farm park and conservation centre located on Wykeham Way in Coulby Newham, Middlesbrough, North Yorkshire, England. It is one of only 16 nationally approved by the Rare Breeds Survival Trust. It is open to the public and has many different breeds, including British White and Beef Shorthorn cattle, Whitefaced Woodland and Wensleydale sheep, Berkshire and Gloucestershire Old Spot pigs and various other farm animals.

Historical exhibits include a reproduction of a 19th-century veterinary surgery and an early 20th-century agricultural merchants shop. The Visitor Centre traces the history of the farm from the 17th century. There are tea rooms, play and picnic areas and an events programme throughout the year.
