= North Ormesby =

Area of Middlesbrough, North Yorkshire, England

Coordinates: 54.5723°N 1.2134°W

North Ormesby: Doggy
- Suburb
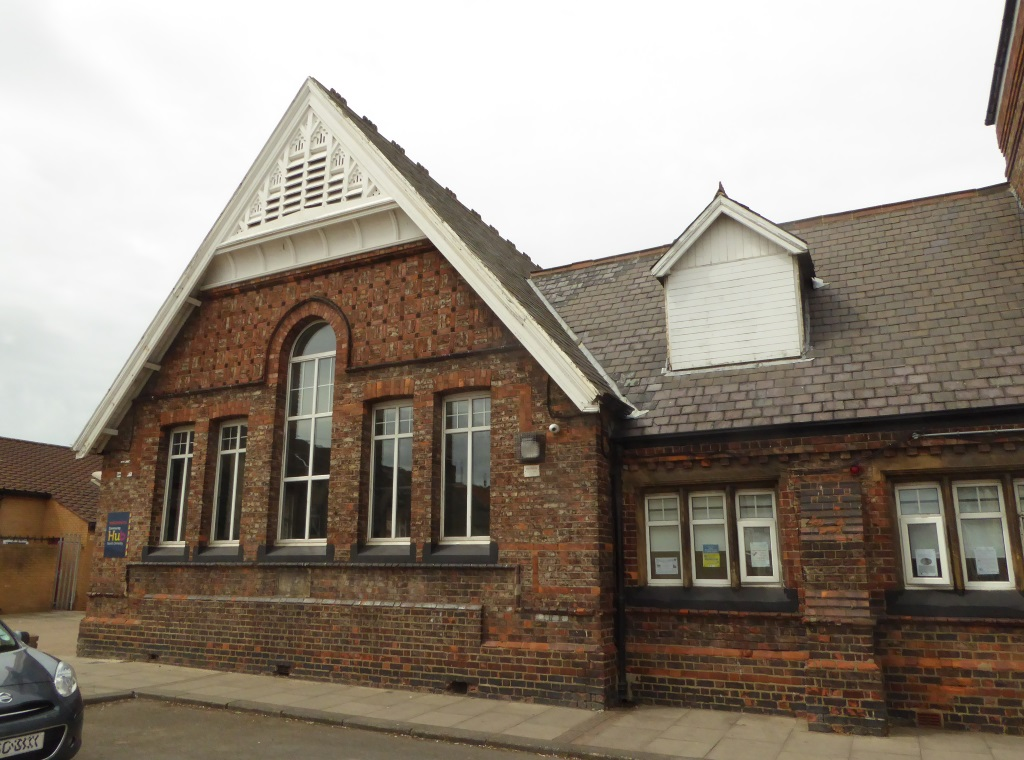
- North Ormesby Community Hub

- Location within North Yorkshire
- Unitary authority: Middlesbrough
- Ceremonial county: North Yorkshire
- Region: North East
- Country: England
- Sovereign state: United Kingdom
- Post town: MIDDLESBROUGH
- Postcode district: TS3
- Dialling code: 01642
- Police: Cleveland
- Fire: Cleveland
- Ambulance: North East
- UK Parliament: Middlesbrough and Thornaby East

North Ormesby is a part of Middlesbrough, North Yorkshire, England. The area has gained the common nickname of Doggy, it is of unknown origin. Population of the now former "North Ormesby and Brambles Farm" ward was 6,268, at the 2011 census, with Brambles Farm being south-east of the area. The area became its own ward in 2015.

It is near the River Tees's southern banks, with the A66 road and Teesdale Way (long-distance walking route) passing to the north of the area, the A171 road (Cargo Fleet Lane) to the east, the A1085 road (Longlands Road) to the south with the A172 road and Esk Valley Line to the west.

== History ==
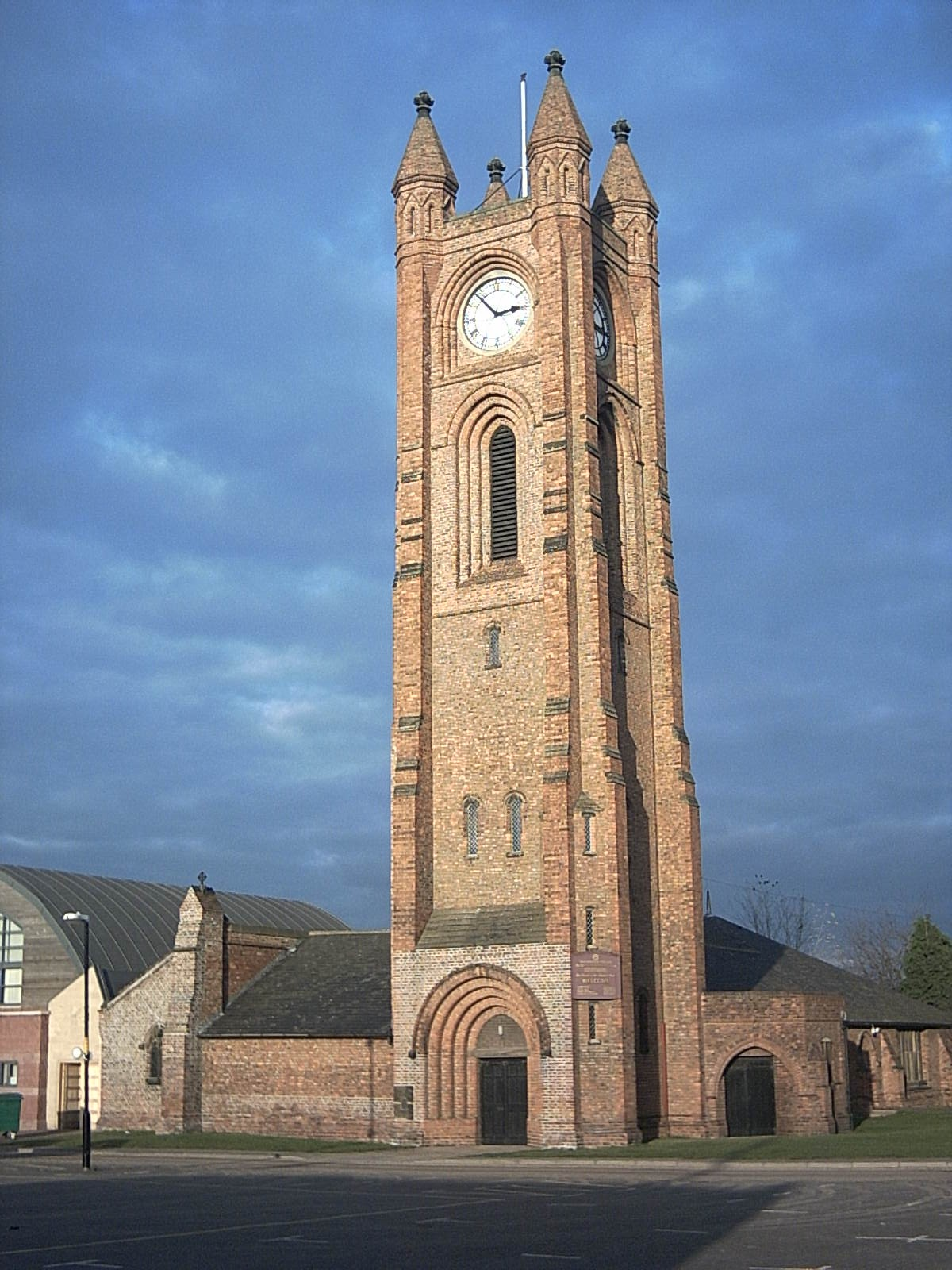
Holy Trinity Church, a grade II listed building and its tower is an important local landmark

Its name, as well as those of various streets in the locality, alludes to the support given to the initial construction of North Ormesby, a new town, in the later 19th century by members of the nearby Ormesby-based Pennyman family. The name therefore comes from being in the northern part of the former Ormesby parish.

The neighbourhood has in recent years seen somewhat of a decline, with much of its original housing having long been demolished, partially as allowance for new developments, including, more recently, the erection of numerous new buildings and the restructuring of the A66 Redcar to Penrith trunk road which passes through the north of the area.

In October 2017, it was revealed to have the cheapest average house price in England and Wales, at £36,000, down 60% since 2007 (after inflation adjustment).

The neighbourhood was featured as the lead story on BBC News at Six on 12 June 2024 as having one of the worst crime rates in Britain with regular robberies, drug dealing, criminal damage and theft.

In 2026 the community hub and library was chosen by Poet Laureate Simon Armitage as one of the venues for his annual library tour which in that year visited libraries in places with initials N-P.

== Notable people ==
- Harry Allport, footballer
- Stanley Hollis, the only person to be awarded a VC for his actions on D-day.
- James Smurthwaite (1916–1989), cricketer for Yorkshire County Cricket Club
