= Stainton, Middlesbrough =

Village in North Yorkshire, England

Coordinates: 54.5211°N 1.2595°W

Stainton
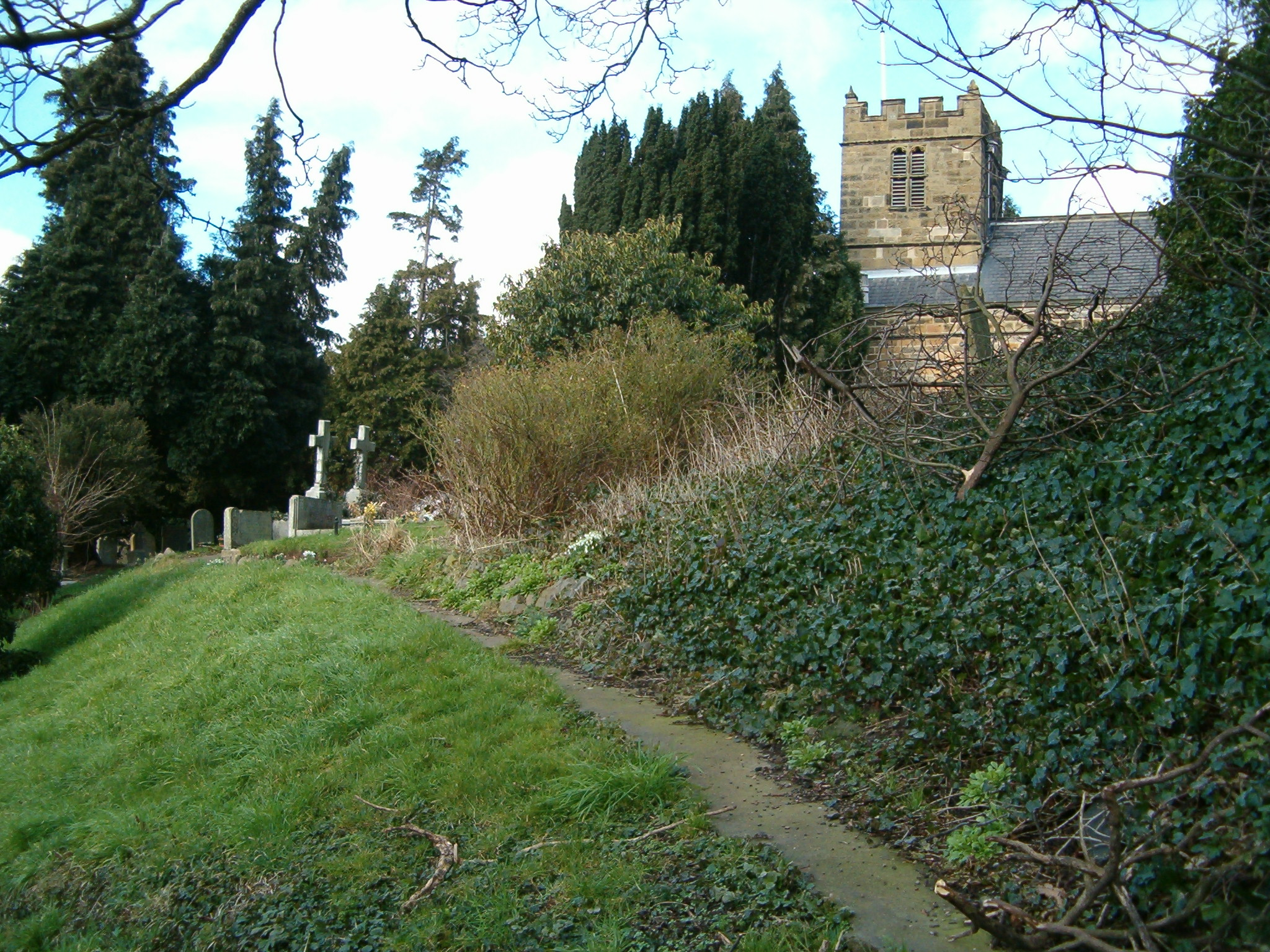
- Stainton Church

- Location within North Yorkshire
- Population: 2,890 (2011)
- OS grid reference: NZ480142
- Civil parish: Stainton and Thornton
- Unitary authority: Middlesbrough
- Ceremonial county: North Yorkshire
- Region: North East
- Country: England
- Sovereign state: United Kingdom
- Post town: MIDDLESBROUGH
- Postcode district: TS8
- Police: Cleveland
- Fire: Cleveland
- Ambulance: North East
- UK Parliament: Middlesbrough South and East Cleveland

Stainton is a village in the south-west outskirts of Middlesbrough, in the Middlesbrough unitary authority, in the ceremonial county of North Yorkshire, England.

The village is in a shared civil parish and ward with Thornton called Stainton and Thornton. The ward had a population of approximately 2,300 as of 2005, measured at 2,890 in the 2011 census. The civil parish has no school so the ward includes parts of Hemlington including Hemlington Hall Academy primary.

== History ==
Stainton was named in the Domesday Book of 1086, when its manors were held by Earl Hugh of Acklam. It has been a settlement since pre-Anglo-Saxon times. Its name is of mixed origin with Old Norse "stan" and Old English "tun", in Modern English stone-town.

St Peter and St Paul Anglican Church dates back to the 12th century and is grade II* listed. The former vicarage, Stainton House, dates from the 19th century and is Grade II listed. Stainton Methodist Church, on Meldyke Lane, dates from 1840. The original village school, now the Memorial Hall, dates from 1844.

The Stainton public house, on Meldyke Lane, was first licensed in 1897, celebrating its centenary in 1997. Stainton Quarry straddles Stainton Beck, between the villages of Stainton and Thornton in Middlesbrough. A footbridge joins it to Kell Gate Green on the other side of the beck. These countryside sites provide three hectares of community-run open green space.

In 1961, the civil parish had a population of 581. On 1 April 1968, the parish was abolished as Teesside County Borough came into existence. Part also went to Maltby. Until 1974 it was in the North Riding of Yorkshire. From 1974 to 1996, it was within Cleveland County.

== Notable people ==
- The parents of the navigator Captain James Cook, James Cook and Grace Pace, were married in the Stainton parish church on 10 October 1725, and the parish register survives. James Cook, the explorer, was born at nearby East Marton three years later.
- William Fawcett, the writer on horses, hunting and racing, was the son of Sir William Fawcett, of The Grange, Stainton, and was a native of the parish.
