= James Smurthwaite =

English cricketer

James Smurthwaite (17 October 1916 – 20 October 1989) was an English first-class cricketer, who played seven matches for Yorkshire County Cricket Club in 1938 and 1939.

Born in North Ormesby, Middlesbrough, Yorkshire, England, Smurthwaite was a fast-medium swing bowler, who could also bowl medium-pace off-breaks. He was a successful bowler for Guisborough in the North Yorkshire and South Durham Cricket League before appearing for Yorkshire. In his first first-class match, in 1938, Yorkshire declared and won by an innings, and Smurthwaite neither batted nor bowled; it was his only County Championship match of the season.

He is most noted for a spell against Derbyshire at Bramall Lane in June 1939, when he and Frank Smailes routed Derbyshire for 20 on a rain-affected pitch. Smurthwaite took five wickets for seven runs, in only four eight-ball overs. This was not the start of a famous career, however, and he was omitted from the team for the next match to make way for Yorkshire's returning Test players. He went back to the Yorkshire Second XI in the Minor Counties Cricket Championship, for whom he took 36 wickets at 12.94 that year.

His hopes of further first-class cricket were dashed by the onset of World War II and the loss of the tip of a finger on his bowling hand. He played as a professional in the North Yorkshire and South Durham League for many years after the war.

In all first-class games, Smurthwaite scored 29 runs, with a best of 20 not out against Worcestershire, and took 12 wickets at 19.75.

He worked as an engineer with ICI, and lived with his wife Lynn in their home in Hutton Lane, Guisborough. He died in October 1989 in North Ormesby.
