= Thorntree =

Area of Middlesbrough, North Yorkshire, England

Coordinates: 54.56618°N 1.18491°W

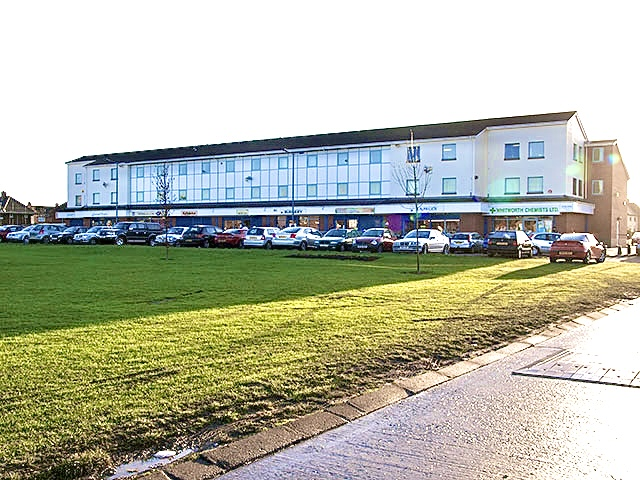
Thorntree shops

Thorntree is a housing estate in east Middlesbrough, North Yorkshire, England. The former Thorntree Ward's population was 6,290, at the 2011 census. Since 2015, the estate shares a ward with Brambles Farm.

The housing estate was built in the late 1940s, in the lands of the former Thorntree Farm, after people started to move away from the terraced housing of Middlesbrough town centre and North Ormesby. It has a public park called Thorntree Park. The main roads of the estate are College Road and The Greenway.

Thorntree Ward had a population of 5,000 and was identified as the 3rd most deprived (out of 8,414) housing ward in England, in 2000. Since the Index of Multiple Deprivation started measuring smaller output areas with a mean population of 1,500, the three areas of Thorntree later ranked 192nd, 205th and 378th most deprived (out of 34,412) in England respectively.

Along with the Brambles Farm area, Thorntree was identified as the ward with the highest proportion of votes to Leave in the Brexit referendum of 2016. 82.5% of local residents voted to leave the EU while 17.5% supported remaining.

== History ==
Much of Thorntree stands on what used to be a farmland. In all, 138 acres (0.56 km^{2}) of Thorntree Farm and 68 acres (280,000 m^{2}) of Low Bottoms Farm were purchased as land on which to site the estate.

=== Channel 4 - Secret Millionaire ===
The estate featured in the Channel 4, Reality TV show, Secret Millionaire, in 2006. Millionaire Paul Williams, from the Green Energy company, Freetricity, and his 20-year-old son Ben lived undercover on Thorntree for 10 days. At the end of the show, he gave £10,000 to local hairdresser, Gina Lawrence, to help her to train trainee hairdressers. He also gave a further £10,000 to The Christian Centre (formerly Thorntree Community Church) Lunch Club, which they used to buy a minibus and fund the club.

== Amenities ==
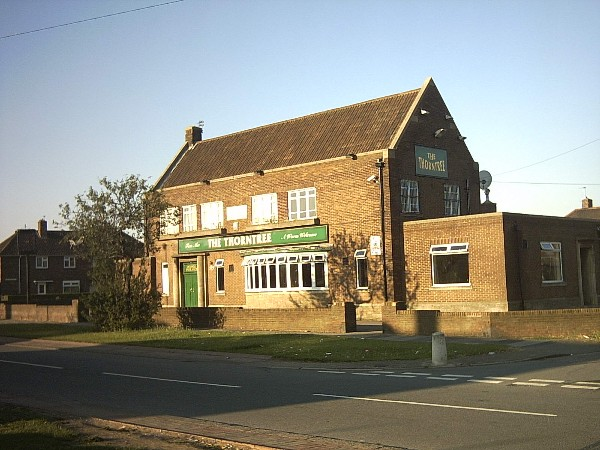
The Thorntree public house

- Public House (1)

The Thorntree

- Schools (2)

Thorntree Primary School, Caldicotes Primary School.

- Churches (2)

Corpus Christi Roman Catholic Church,
The Christian Centre.
