= Brambles Farm =

Area of Middlesbrough, North Yorkshire, England

Coordinates: 54.56712°N 1.19108°W

Brambles Farm is a small housing estate in east Middlesbrough, England with a population of 3,200. It lies to the north of Thorntree and east of Pallister.

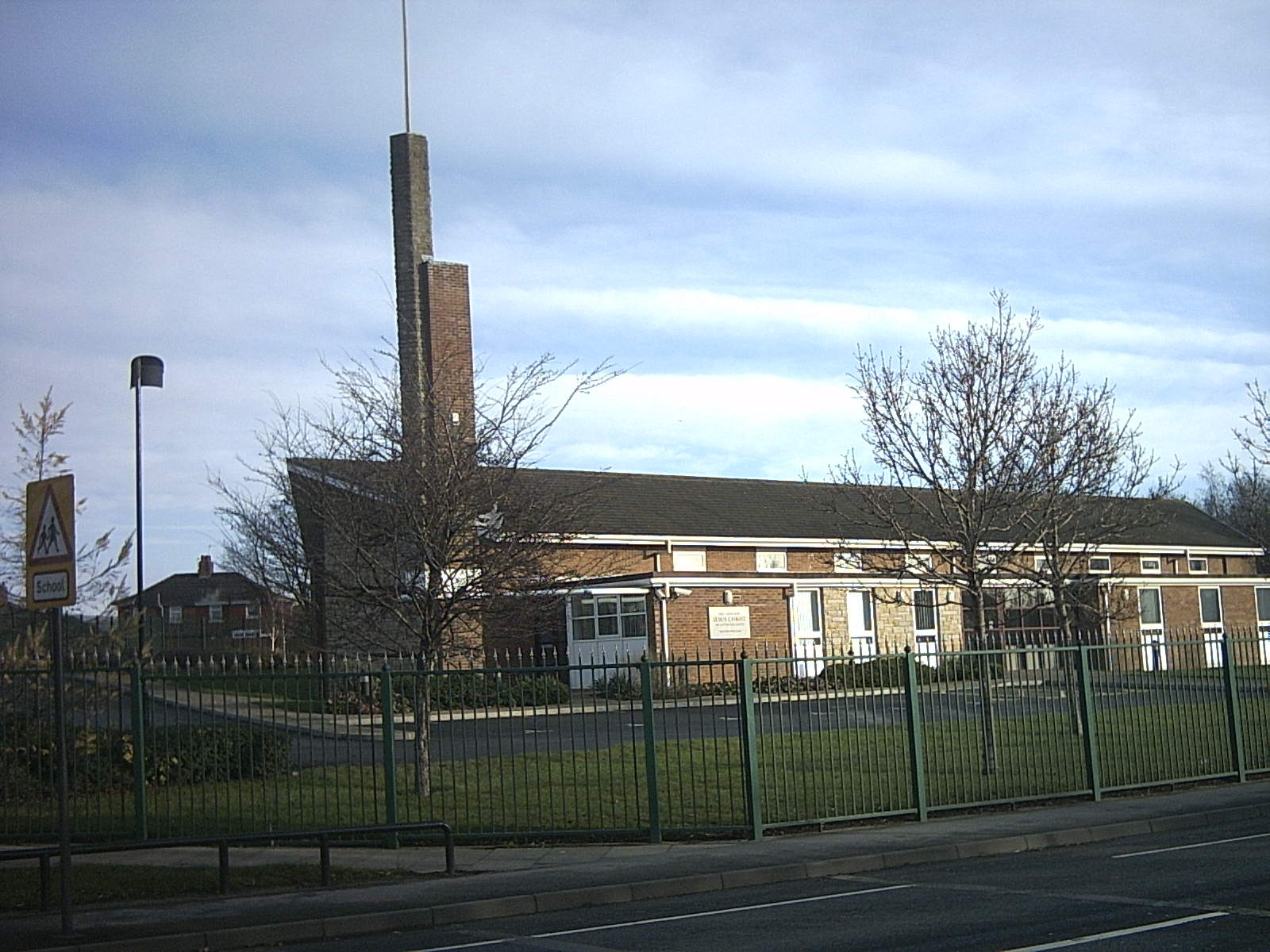
The Church of Jesus Christ of Latter-Day Saints, south Brambles Farm

== Schools ==
Brambles Primary Academy, part of the Navigate Academies Trust, is a primary school in Brambles Farm. Teaching and learning at Brambles Primary Academy are considered to be 'outstanding', by Ofsted. The school works closely with its partner academies in the Navigate Academies Trust, including Pennyman Primary Academy, in nearby Netherfields.

== Brambles Farm FC ==
Local residents formed this football team to combat anti-social behaviour among some of its youths.
