= Berwick Hills =

Area of Middlesbrough, North Yorkshire, England

Coordinates: 54.562°N 1.205°W

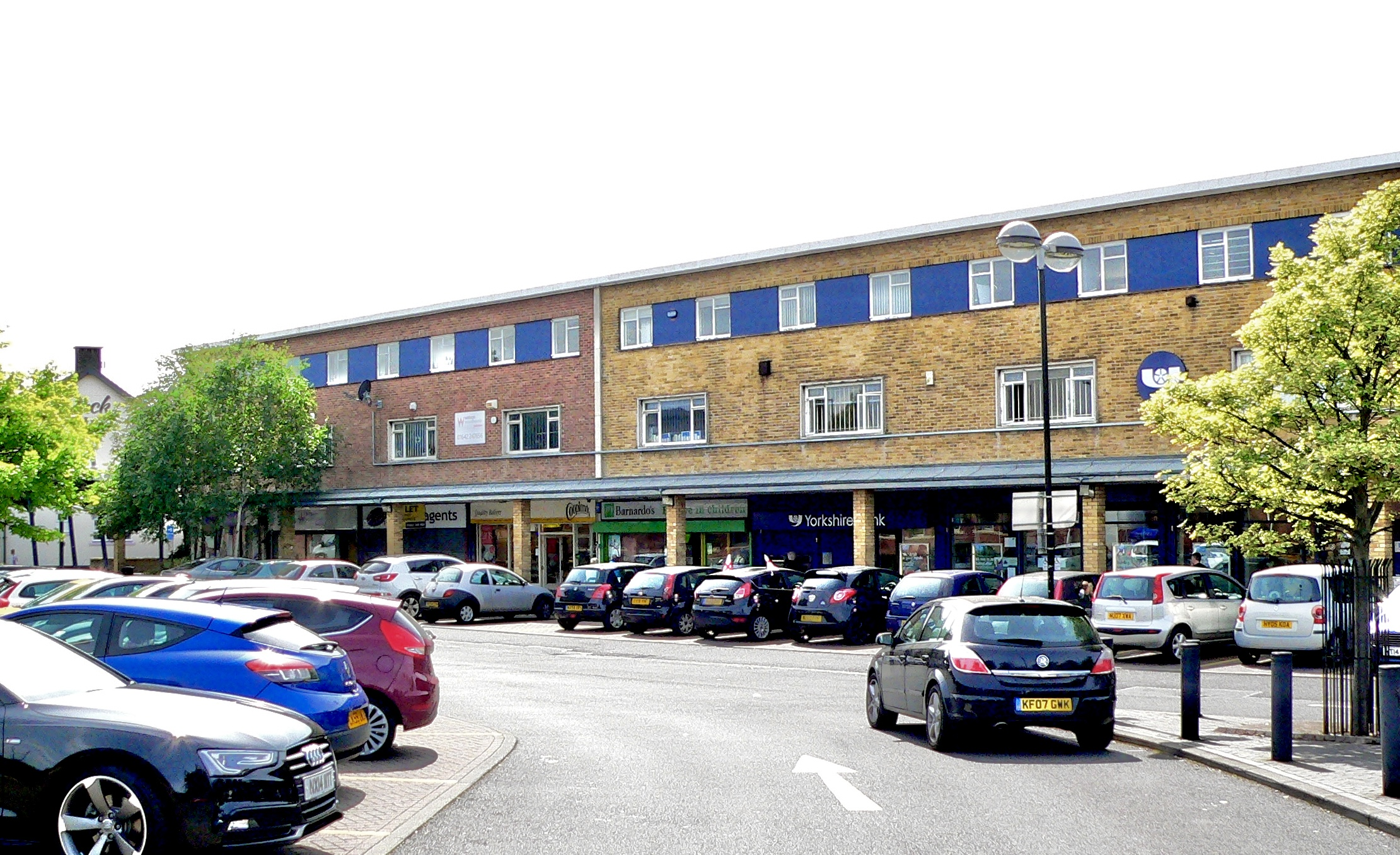
- The Berwick Hills row of shops

- Location within North Yorkshire
- Population: 4,465
- Unitary authority: Middlesbrough
- Ceremonial county: North Yorkshire
- Region: North East
- Country: England
- Sovereign state: United Kingdom
- Post town: MIDDLESBROUGH
- Postcode district: TS3
- Dialling code: 01642
- Police: Cleveland
- Fire: Cleveland
- Ambulance: North East
- UK Parliament: Middlesbrough

Berwick Hills is a suburb in the Borough of Middlesbrough in North Yorkshire, England with a population of 4,465. It is east of Middlesbrough centre. The ward it belongs to is shared with the smaller area of Pallister. Both are separated by Ormesby Road.

== Economy and community ==
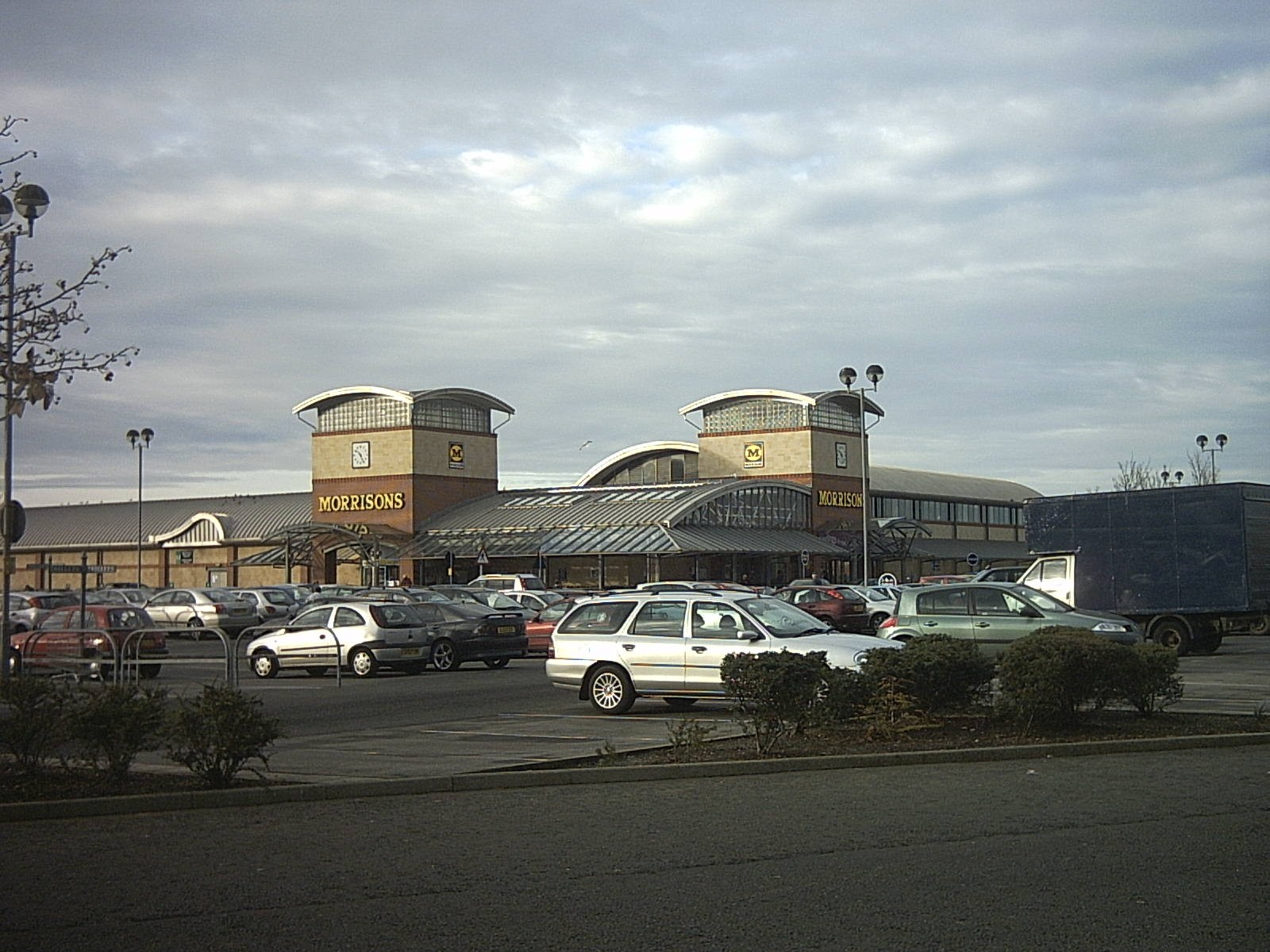
Morrisons Supermarket

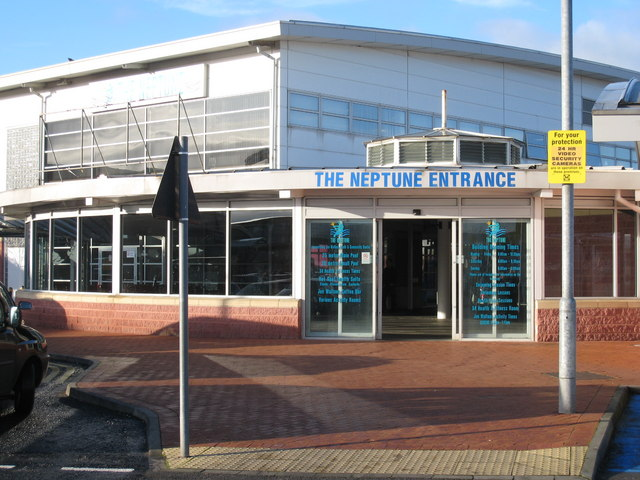
The Neptune Centre

The suburb's centre has a supermarket, public swimming pool, municipal library and a shopping parade. The public swimming facility is called the Neptune Centre. It is a regional venue for competitive swimming. There is also a health and fitness club at the site.

== Primary school ==
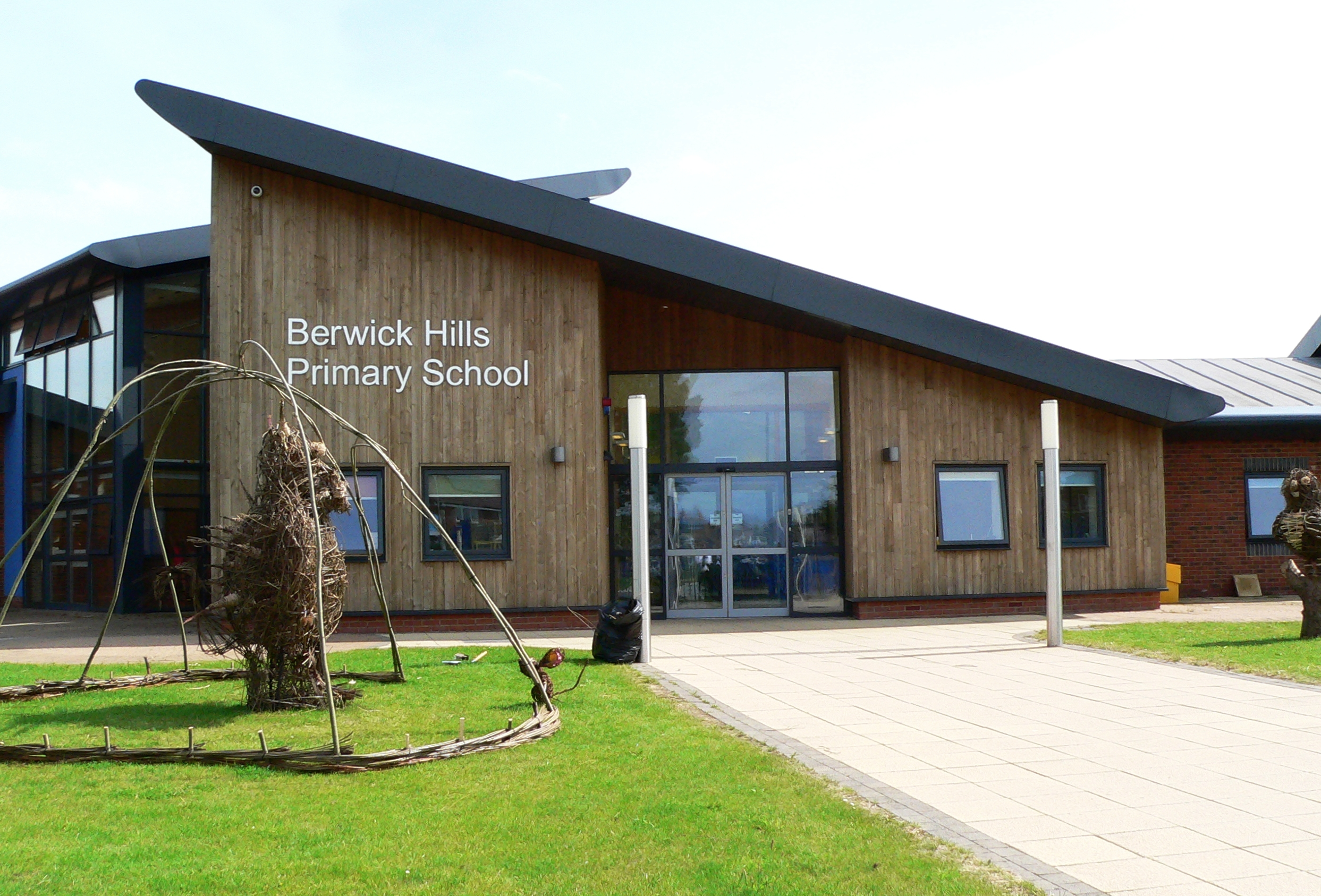
Berwick Hills Primary School, Middlesbrough

Berwick Hills Primary opened in 1954, as two schools, an infant and a junior school, with a combined 446 children. The schools later amalgamated, but it was not until 2011 that a new building was built.

The present school is a single-storey, £5.8 million, eco-friendly facility, It has solar panels on the roof and wind turbines to generate electricity. The layout comprises a central hub area, that includes a hall, library and reception area, with three branches providing the classrooms for 315 children.

A number of computer work stations are sited around the school in addition to a central ICT unit for use by pupils.

The school has a multi-use games area (MUGA). The building itself has a very good BREEAM rating of 55 – showing energy efficiency. Services provided onsite include a Sure Start centre, breakfast club and after-school clubs. Additional facilities include: sports hall with changing rooms, all-weather pitch, dance studio, trim trail, school library, computer suite.

The steps taken during the construction process to reduce environmental impacts, include innovative construction management techniques, responsible sourcing of materials such as timber and the use of recycled hardcore. The social, or economically sustainable, measures achieved, or piloted, include air source heat pumps. In addition to this, Tees Valley Wildlife Trust worked with the design team and school to enhance the schools ecology and natural habitat area. There is provision of cycle storage. The school area actively encouraging recycling. Photo voltaic panels are fitted to roof areas to generate electricity and there is a wind-turbine on site.

== Sculpture ==
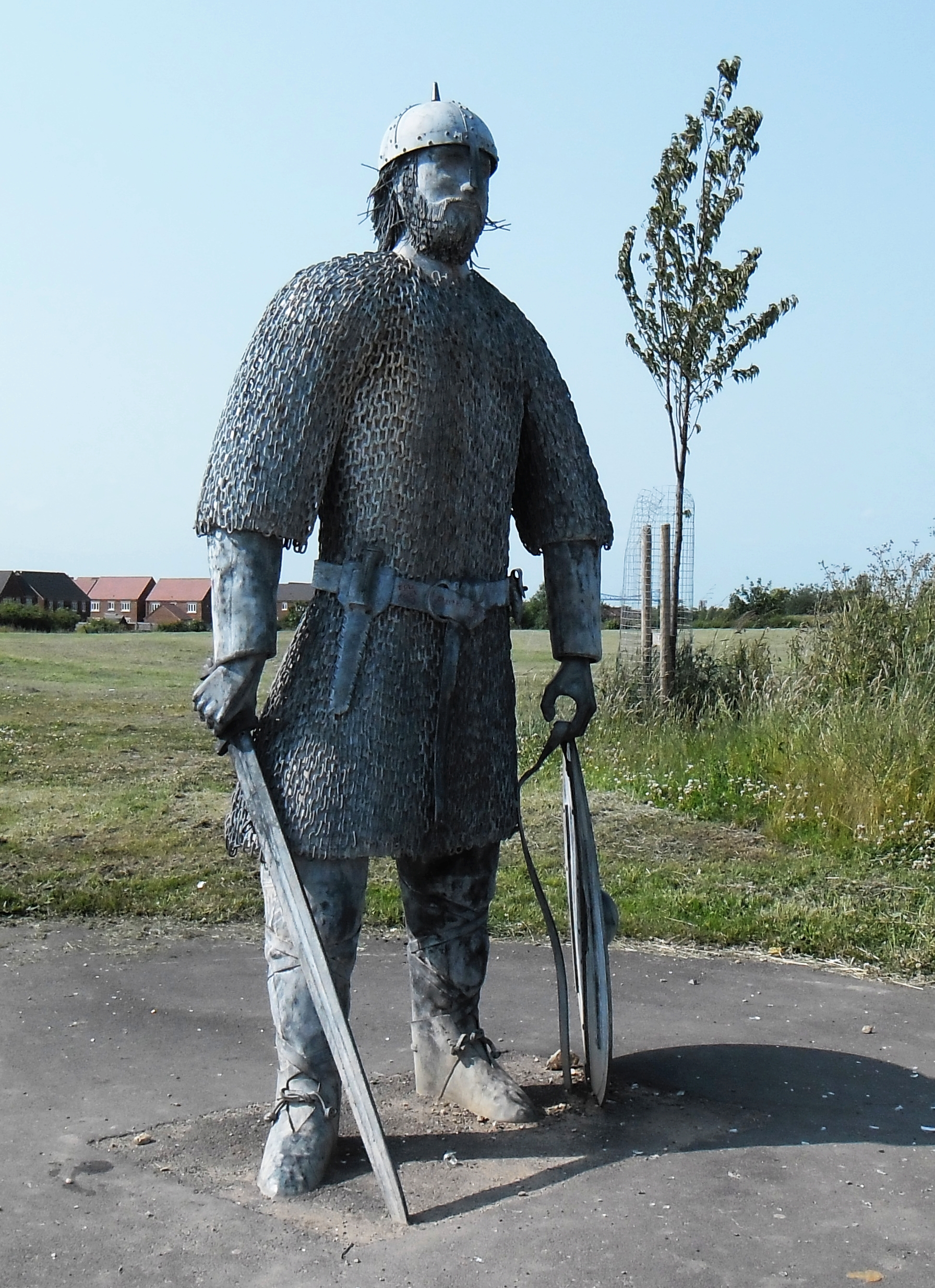
The sculpture of Orme the Viking, Berwick Hills

As part of the Ormesby Beck landscaping project, in 2012, a large sculpture in the form of Orme the Viking was installed. The community artwork was made possible as part of the landscaping initiative undertaken by the Ormesby Beck Friendship Group with a Community Spaces grant from Groundwork UK. It was installed alongside realignment work by the Environment Agency to address flooding issues.

Groundwork officer Judith Underwood and Berwick Hills community worker Catherine Hughes worked with staff and pupils at Berwick Hills Primary School to design the statue, along with its outfit and weapons, and a dragon themed seating in the beck area. The Viking symbolises the area's Viking history.

== Notable people ==
- Dael Fry - footballer
- Phil Stamp - footballer
- Peter McCormick - football lawyer
- Sid Barras - UK & International road-racing cycling champion
