= Coulby Newham =

Area of Middlesbrough, North Yorkshire, England

Coordinates: 54.524°N 1.217°W

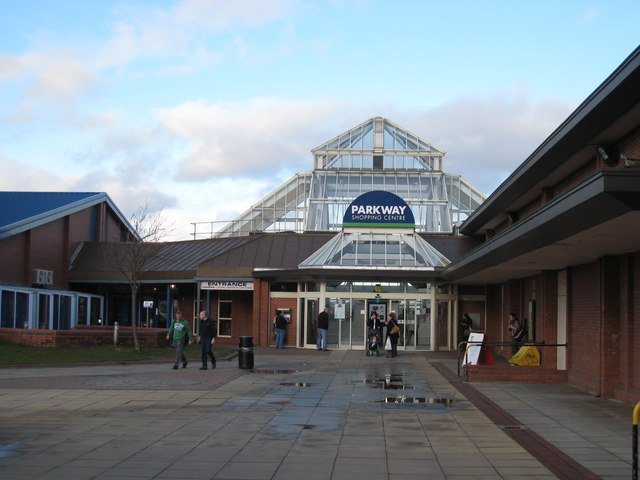
- The Parkway Shopping Centre

- Location within North Yorkshire
- Population: 8,967 (2011)
- Unitary authority: Middlesbrough
- Ceremonial county: North Yorkshire
- Region: North East
- Country: England
- Sovereign state: United Kingdom
- Post town: MIDDLESBROUGH
- Postcode district: TS8
- Dialling code: 01642
- Police: Cleveland
- Fire: Cleveland
- Ambulance: North East
- UK Parliament: Middlesbrough South and East Cleveland

Coulby Newham is an area in the Borough of Middlesbrough, North Yorkshire, England, with a resident population of 10,700, measured at 8,967 (Coulby Newham Ward) at the 2011 Census.

== History ==
=== Early ===
Coulby Newham began as farmland and this is reflected in the names of many of the streets such as Lingfield, Manor Farm Way and Paddock Wood. 'Colebi' and 'Nieweham', were separate medieval hamlets when identified in the Domesday Book of 1086, formerly covered this site.

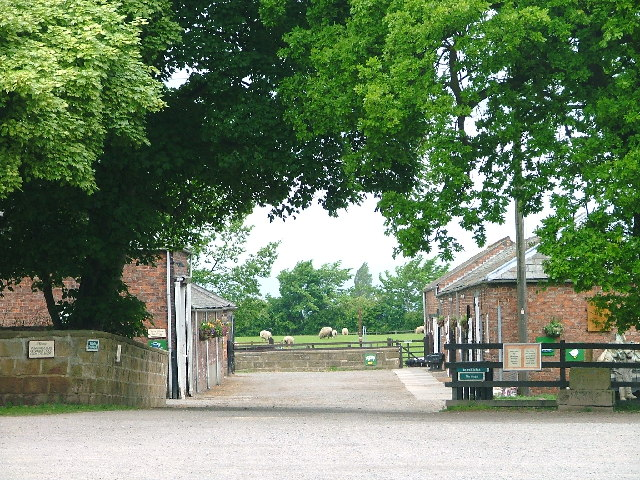
Newham Grange Leisure farm

The agricultural legacy of the area, reminiscent indeed of that of the entire wider Middlesbrough area, is still touched on today by the working Newham Grange Leisure farm, itself harking as far back to life in this particular spot of rural Yorkshire as the 17th century.

=== Modern ===
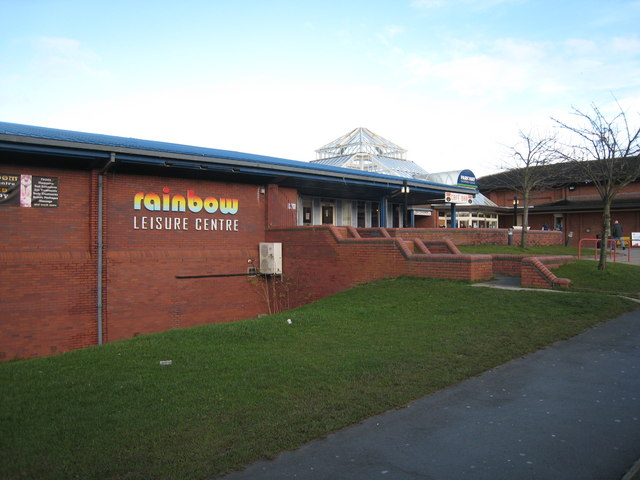
Rainbow Leisure Centre

By the 1970s, Middlesbrough's continual southerly urban expansion reached the area. The area's construction in 1978 was featured in the 1980 BBC TV Play for Today, Alan Bleasdale's "The Black Stuff". It is a black comedy/drama starring Bernard Hill (Yosser Hughes) and the late Michael Angelis (Chrissie Todd). They and others play Liverpool Scouser labourers, who travel up to Middlesbrough together and are employed in laying black tarmacadam on the estate's roads. This classic programme is rated a high 8/10 on the Internet Movie Database (IMDb).

Coulby Newham developed after the building of the A174 Parkway opened in 1986, Parkway Shopping Centre was renamed.

=== Farm fire (2017) ===
In July 2017, a series of arson attacks took place at Newham Hall Farm; a 12-year-old boy was found responsible for one of the blazes, and two other boys of the same age were interviewed in connection with the fires.

== Education and religion ==
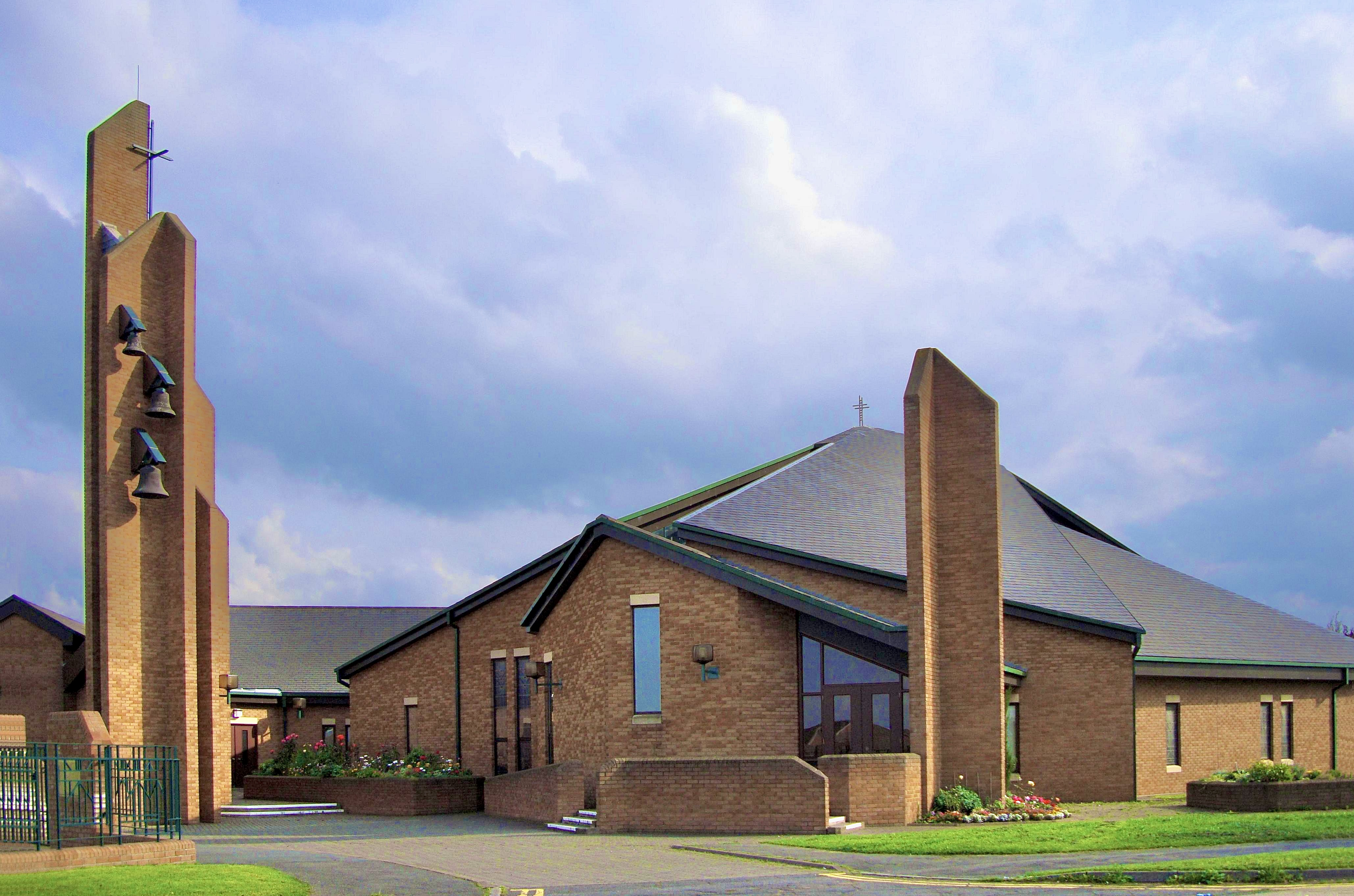
St Mary's Roman Catholic Cathedral

There are now three primary schools: Sunnyside Primary School, Rose Wood Academy and St Augustine's RC School. The suburb also contains two churches, Coulby Newham Baptist Church and a Roman Catholic cathedral.

The first major building in Coulby Newham was Coulby Newham Secondary School (replaced in 2003 by The King's Academy). Coulby Newham Secondary opened with Year 7–10 in the late 1970s, receiving many students that had been excluded from Acklam schools Hustler and Boynton.

== Amenities ==
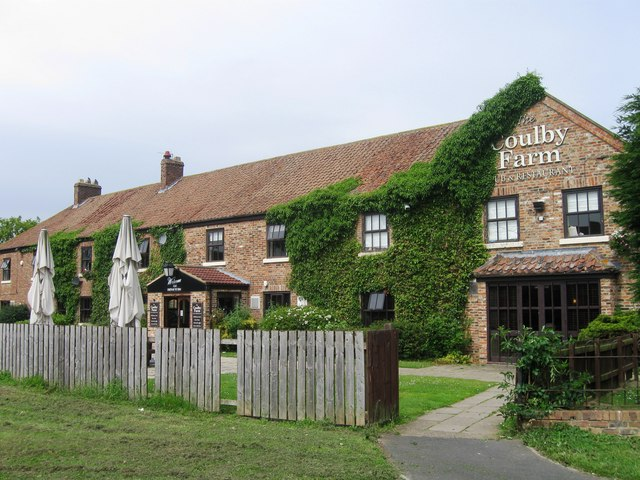
Coulby Farm

Coulby Newham has a wide arrange of amenities including: Pets at Home, Boyes, and Subway.
