= Pallister =

Area of Middlesbrough, North Yorkshire, England

Coordinates: 54.56359°N 1.20043°W

Pallister is an area in the borough of Middlesbrough, North Yorkshire, England. It is located within the TS3 postcode area. The Pallister Ward (shared with the larger Berwick Hills) had population at the 2011 Census of 6,069, the ward was later renamed in 2015 to Berwick Hills and Pallister.

The area, made up of mostly housing association houses, has developed a reputation over the years for crime and anti-social behaviour.

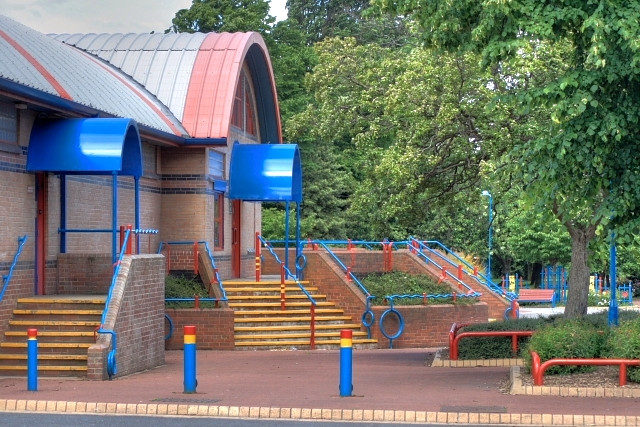
Pallister Park

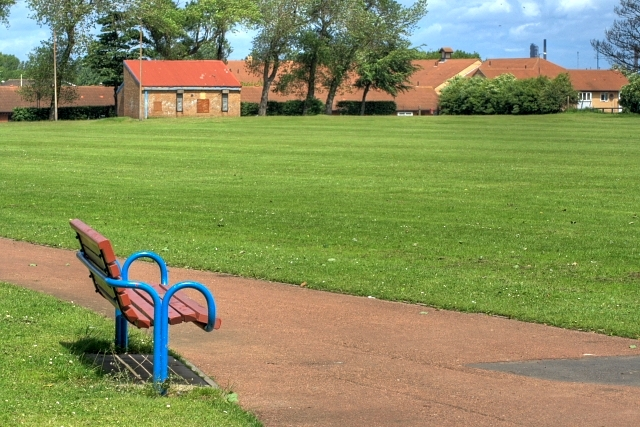
Pallister Park field

It is also known as Pallister Park or Pally Park because of the public park located at the northern edge of the area.

== Education ==
There are two primary schools in the area - Pallister Park Primary School, on Gribdale Road and Corpus Christi RC Primary School, on Cargo Fleet Lane. There is a secondary school, Unity City Academy, towards the south of the area. The road that flows through the main area is Homerton Road and Cranmore Road.

== Famous people from Pallister ==
- Stewart Downing Footballer
- Ged Parsons Comedy writer on television programmes such as 'Have I Got News For You', 'Mock the Week', etc.
- John McKitterick - Head of Fashion Design Department, Kingston University
- Sean Davies - Footballer
