= Grade I and Grade II* listed buildings in Middlesbrough (borough) =

There are over 9,000 Grade I listed buildings and 20,000 Grade II* listed buildings in England. This page is a list of these buildings in the district of Middlesbrough in North Yorkshire.

== Grade I ==
Name	Location	Type	Completed (Note: The date given is the date used by Historic England as significant for the initial building or that of an important part in the structure's description.)	Date designated	Grid ref. (Note: The grid reference is based on the British national grid reference system, sometimes known as OSGB36, used by the Ordnance Survey.) Geo-coordinates	Entry number (Note: The "List Entry Number" is a unique number assigned to each listed building and scheduled monument by Historic England.)	Image
Acklam Hall	Acklam	Country house	c. 1680	25 October 1951	NZ4871716980; 54°32′45″N 1°14′54″W	1136868	Acklam Hall More images

== Grade II* ==
Name	Location	Type	Completed	Date designated	Grid ref. Geo-coordinates	Entry number	Image
Grey Towers House (Poole Hospital) and attached Wall	Nunthorpe, Middlesbrough	Country House	1865-67	28 July 1988	NZ5362813392; 54°30′47″N 1°10′23″W	1139813	Grey Towers House (Poole Hospital) and attached Wall More images
Church of St. Peter and St. Paul	Stainton and Thornton, Middlesbrough	Church	13th century	23 June 1966	NZ4804314050; 54°31′10″N 1°15′34″W	1137540	Church of St. Peter and St. Paul More images
Stainton Grange and Garden Walls	Stainton and Thornton, Middlesbrough	Farmhouse	Early/Mid 18th century	23 June 1966	NZ4904013736; 54°31′00″N 1°14′38″W	1329531	Upload Photo
Church of All Saints	Middlesbrough	Church	1873-78	17 July 1968	NZ4943220145; 54°34′27″N 1°14′13″W	1252480	Church of All Saints More images
Church of St John the Evangelist	Middlesbrough	Church	1881/83	17 July 1968	NZ5011120207; 54°34′29″N 1°13′35″W	1139854	Church of St John the Evangelist More images
Church of St. Cuthbert	Marton, Middlesbrough	Church	12th century	23 June 1966	NZ5147115878; 54°32′08″N 1°12′22″W	1329502	Church of St. Cuthbert More images
Dock Clock Tower	Middlesbrough	Clock Tower	c. 1870	14 October 1999	NZ5024820919; 54°34′52″N 1°13′27″W	1139871	Dock Clock Tower More images
Empire Mecca Social Club	Middlesbrough	Social Club	1896/99	28 July 1988	NZ4966620350; 54°34′33″N 1°14′00″W	1329519	Empire Mecca Social Club More images
Town Hall and Municipal Buildings	Middlesbrough	Local Government Office	1883/89	17 July 1968	NZ4960820334; 54°34′33″N 1°14′03″W	1136659	Town Hall and Municipal Buildings More images
Middlesbrough Transporter Bridge	Middlesbrough	Transporter Bridge	1911	28 July 1988	NZ4996821260; 54°35′03″N 1°13′42″W	1139845	Middlesbrough Transporter Bridge More images
7 Zetland Road	Middlesbrough	Office	1881/91	13 February 1963	NZ4954520634; 54°34′43″N 1°14′06″W	1312336	7 Zetland Road More images
