= Joseph Isherwood =

British naval architect (1870–1937)

Sir Joseph Isherwood Bt
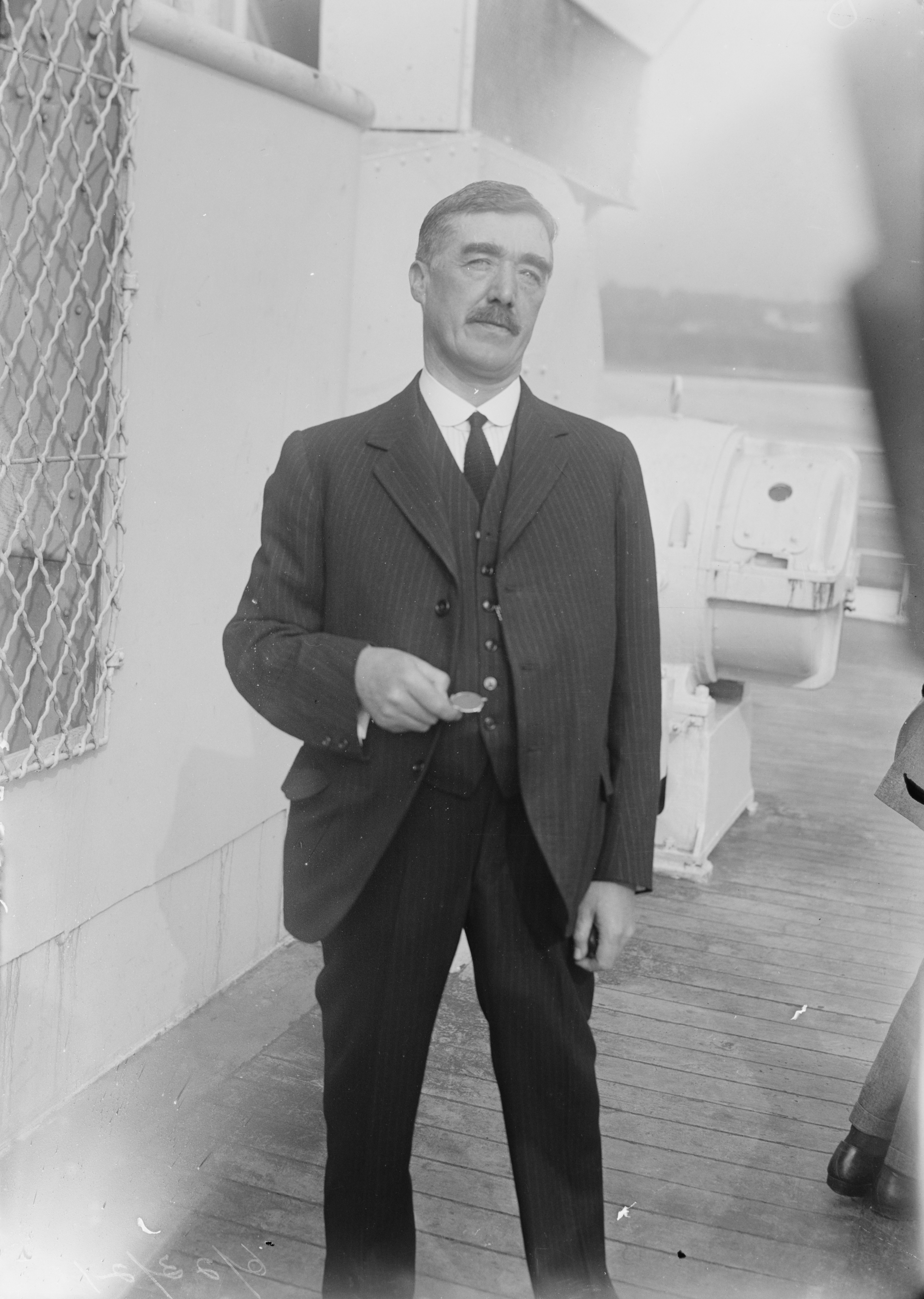
- Photographed aboard the RMS Olympic, in 1921
- Born: Joseph William Isherwood; 23 June 1870; Hartlepool, County Durham, England
- Died: 24 October 1937 (aged 67); Grosvenor House, Park Lane, London, England
- Resting place: St. Mary's Church, Acklam, Middlesbrough
- Occupation: Naval architect
- Spouse: Annie Mary Fleetham
- Children: Five

Coat of arms of Joseph Isherwood

Crest
A lymphad sails furled Sable surmounted by a rainbow Proper.
Escutcheon
Argent a fess dancetee Azure between three rudders Proper.
Motto
Perficio Cursuili (I Accomplish My Course)

Sir Joseph William Isherwood, 1st Baronet (23 June 1870 – 24 October 1937) was a British naval architect. He invented the Isherwood System of longitudinal construction of ships and the Arcform System.

Isherwood was born in Hartlepool, the son of a grocer. He was educated at Luggs School on the Headland, near St Hilda's church, and at the age of fifteen entered the drawing office of the Hartlepool shipbuilders Edward Withy & Co. He served in several departments in that firm and in 1896 left to become a ship surveyor with Lloyd's Register of Shipping. Here he developed the Isherwood System, a new stronger, safer, and cheaper longitudinal girder form of ship construction designed to replace the traditional traverse construction method (ribs placed at regular intervals along the keel), which he patented in 1906.

In 1907 he left Lloyd's to join the board of the shipbuilders R. Craggs & Sons of Middlesbrough, but soon returned to London to practise as a naval architect. The first ship constructed using his system was the Paul Paix, completed in August 1908, the first of many. Isherwood made a number of other significant contributions to his profession, notably the arcform hull design, which he introduced in 1933. His offices were located at Coronation House, 4 Lloyd's Avenue, London (next door to Lloyd's Register of Shipping), The Whitehall Building, 17 Battery Place, New York, and The Zetland Buildings, Middlesbrough.

During the First World War, Isherwood gave his designs for torpedo-proof cargo vessels to the government free of charge. Most of his designs and patents were tested in liaison with the government at the National Physical Laboratory in Teddington. Isherwood designed ships for the wealthiest company in the world, Standard Oil, notably the ship S. V. Harkness, named after Stephen V. Harkness. The Harkness family were the silent partner of John D. Rockefeller.

Isherwood was created a Baronet, of Raggleswood, in the 1921 Birthday Honours in recognition of his invention of the Isherwood System. The name of his baronetcy was taken from his country home, Raggleswood, in Chistlehurst, Kent. The Isherwood Armorial at Raggleswood is recorded as Argent, a fesse dancettee azure, between three rudders proper. Mantling azure and argent. Crest–On a wreath of the colours, a lymphoid sails furled sable, surmounted by a rainbow proper. Badge–Two daffodils, leaved and slipped proper, enfiled by a circlet or. Motto–"Perficio curium."

The Americans also gave Isherwood their own version of Commendation and Honour with a Testimonial Dinner at the Waldorf Astoria Hotel in New York with over a hundred of the great and good from the North American shipbuilding scene and a eulogy which began: “When God intended that we should ultimately harness Jupiter and utilize the unseen forces of the ether for the benefit of mankind, He created Benjamin Franklin. When He intended that the peoples of the earth should come in closer communication with one another He created Morse and Alexander Graham Bell; and when it became His will that a greater safeguard be thrown about the lives of human beings on board ships at sea, he created Joseph William Isherwood.”

More than seven different International Governments adopted Isherwood's designs and patents, including Japan.

Isherwood was a valued member of Lloyd's Technical Committee; he was also a Freeman and a Liveryman of the Worshipful Company of Shipwrights, having joined in April 1917. Subsequently, he became a Warden during April 1937.

Isherwood married Annie Mary Fleetham in 1892. They had five children: Arnold, Alberta, Beatrice, William and Marie. Beatrice died in 1896, aged two months, Alberta died in 1909, aged 14 years, and Arnold died five years later in 1914, aged 21. After Alberta's death, her parents presented St Mary's church, West Acklam, with a silver chalice, paten and wafer box. In 1914, after the death of Arnold, they commissioned and gave the church hall (designed in the Arts and Crafts style) in memory of their children. Today this is still known as the Isherwood Hall. There is a bronze memorial plaque located inside the hall and also memorial tablets and plaques located inside the church to honour their memory.

Isherwood died of pneumonia in 1937 at his London home, Grosvenor House, Park Lane, London W1. He was succeeded by his son William as second baronet. Isherwood is buried at St Mary's church (within the grounds of Acklam Hall), West Acklam, alongside Alberta and Arnold. Lady Isherwood is buried at St Luke's cemetery, Bromley, alongside William. Beatrice is buried at Spion Kop cemetery, Hartlepool.

== Footnotes ==
Baronetage of the United Kingdom
New creation	Baronet (of Raggles Wood); 1921–1937	Succeeded by William Isherwood
