= All Saints' Church, Middlesbrough =

Church in North Yorkshire, England

All Saints' Church
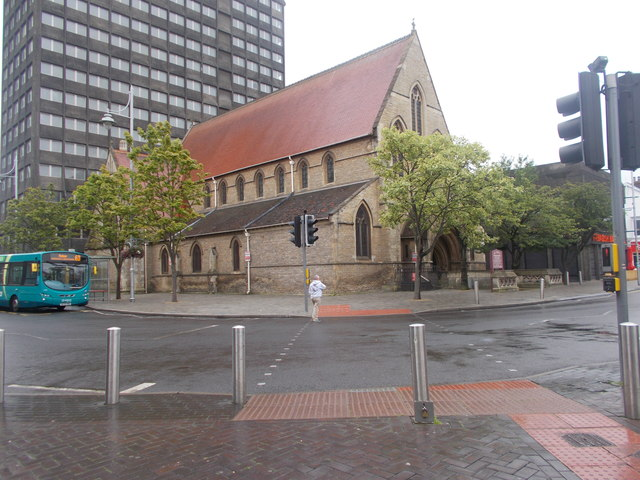
- The church, in 2017
- All Saints' Church
- 54.574112°N 1.236853°W
- OS grid reference: NZ 49432 20145
- Location: Middlesbrough, North Yorkshire
- Country: England
- Denomination: Church of England
- Churchmanship: Anglo-Catholic

History
- Status: Active
- Dedication: All Saints
- Dedicated: 1877
- Consecrated: 1877

Architecture
- Functional status: Active
- Heritage designation: Grade II*
- Designated: 17 July 1968
- Architect: G. E. Street
- Style: Gothic revival
- Completed: 1878

Specifications
- Materials: Stone, brick

Administration
- Province: York
- Diocese: York
- Archdeaconry: Cleveland
- Deanery: Middlesbrough
- Parish: Middlesbrough

Clergy
- Bishop: Stephen Race (AEO)

All Saints' Church is a parish church in Middlesbrough, a large town in North East England.

== History ==
Work started on building the church in 1875, when the population of the town was growing rapidly. It was designed by G. E. Street. It opened in 1877, but the steeple was only completed the following year. In 1879, the church was given its own parish, created from parts of the parish of St John's Church, Middlesbrough and St Paul's Church. The church was grade II* listed in 1968.

The church is built of limestone with steep clay tile roofs. The interior is in brick, with stone arcades and dressings, while the chancel has been painted. The church consists of a nave and chancel with aisles, and has a west porch. It is in the Decorated Gothic style, but has Geometric Gothic tracery. Most of the windows are lancets, some arranged in stepped fashion. At the east side of the north transept, there is an octagonal bell turret, with a spirelet and three bell openings. The chancel has round windows in the clerestory and a rose window at the east end. Inside, there are statues of saints in spandrels in the nave, below a false hammerbeam roof. There is an organ gallery at the west end. There is an octagonal font, while the chancel has marble paving and a marble-panelled altar, dating from 1897, with carvings of angels and a pelican. The reredos is by Burlison and Grylls, who also made the stained glass in the east window. In the north aisle windows there is stained glass by A. O. Hemming, and most other windows have stained glass from the late 19th or early 20th centuries.

== Present day ==
The church belongs to the Anglo Catholic tradition of the Church of England and is part of The Society. As it rejects ordination of women as priests and bishops, the parish receives alternative episcopal oversight from the Bishop of Beverley (currently Stephen Race).

== Notable clergy ==
- John Goddard; incumbent, 1982 to 1988

== See also ==
- Grade I and Grade II* listed buildings in Middlesbrough (borough)
