= Outwood Academy Acklam =

Location
- Hall Drive; Acklam; Middlesbrough, North Yorkshire, TS5 7JY; England; 54.54340°N 1.24510°W

Information
- Type: Academy
- Motto: Students first
- Established: 2011
- Trust: Outwood Grange
- Department for Education URN: 139823 Tables
- Ofsted: Reports
- Executive Principal: Steve Merifield
- Principal: Graham Skidmore
- Gender: Mixed
- Age: 11 to 16
- Enrolment: 1071 as of January 2018
- Capacity: 1350
- Houses: Africa, Asia, The Americas, Europe, Oceania
- Colours: Purple and gold
- Website: acklam.outwood.com

Outwood Academy Acklam (formerly Oakfields Community College) is a comprehensive secondary school with academy status, located in the Acklam area of Middlesbrough, England. It has a mixed intake of both boy and girls, ages 11–16, with over 1200/1300 pupils on roll 2026.

The school is operated by Outwood Grange Academies Trust, and the current principal is Graham Skidmore.

The school is designated as a National Support School - meaning that it is recognised as a high performing school able to provide support to other schools.

== History ==
The school was first established as Oakfields Community College in September 2011, replacing Hall Garth Community Arts College and King's Manor School in Hall Drive, Acklam. The school then relocated to new building opened in September 2012 as part of Middlesbrough's £100 million Building Schools for the Future scheme.

Oakfields Community College received its first Ofsted inspection report in February 2012, and was placed in special measures after receiving an 'inadequate' rating, the lowest possible. In June 2012 a further Ofsted report again rated the school as inadequate. During this time it was sponsored by the Endeavour Education Trust made up of Macmillan Academy, Middlesbrough College and Teesside University.

The school converted to academy status in September 2013 under the new sponsorship of the Outwood Grange Academies Trust, and was renamed Outwood Academy Acklam. The chief executive is Sir Michael Wilkins, who was recognised in 2010 by the National College for School Leadership with a 'systems leadership award' and was knighted for services to education in the Queen's New Year Honours 2014.

== See also ==
- Outwood Grange Academies Trust
