= Acklam Grange School =

Coordinates: 54.54489°N 1.26401°W

Location
- Lodore Grove; Acklam; Middlesbrough, North Yorkshire, TS5 8PB; England

Information
- Type: Academy
- Established: 1952
- Local authority: Middlesbrough Council
- Trust: The Legacy Learning Trust
- Department for Education URN: 145774 Tables
- Ofsted: Reports
- Head teacher: Michael Laidler
- Gender: Co-educational
- Age: 11 to 16
- Website: http://www.acklamgrange.org.uk/

Acklam Grange School is a co-educational secondary school located at Lodore Grove, Acklam, Middlesbrough, England.

The school opened in 1952 as Hugh Bell School – later becoming Stainsby School – and is currently Acklam Grange Secondary School (after Stainsby and Oaklands School amalgamated in 1983 the combined school was renamed Acklam Grange School). It educates pupils Year 7 through Year 11. The current headteacher is Michael Laidler.

The school is one of the few in the area that has continued to be a part of the Building Schools for the Future programme after the announced spending cuts by the Government.

The school received a Grade 3 (satisfactory) rating from Ofsted in 2012, followed by a 'Requires Improvement' rating in December 2013, and a 'Good' rating in February 2016.

Previously a community school administered by Middlesbrough Council, in July 2018 Acklam Grange School converted to academy status. The school is now sponsored by The Legacy Learning Trust.

In October 2022, Ofsted gave it a 'Good' rating.

== Facilities ==
Facilities include:

- six 2-story buildings, each housing two or more departments
- a virtual learning environment
- Middlesbrough City Learning Centre, a community building offering IT facilities
- Acorn Centre, a sport centre

The new building, on the former playing fields of the old school, was constructed by contractors Willmott Dixon. It opened on 6 September 2010 and cost over £27 million.

The Acorn Centre is a £2.2 million sport centre which was opened in January 2005 following its official launch by Gary Pallister. It includes a sports hall, a fitness studio, and a classroom.

The site of the old school has since been landscaped into a car parking and entrance area. Bricks from the old school were sold to pupils, parents, staff, and alumni.

== Notable former pupils ==
- Pete Firman (Acklam Grange School), comedian and magician
- Journey South (Acklam Grange School), singing duo
