= Hall Garth Community Arts College =

Location
- Hall Drive; Acklam; Middlesbrough, North Yorkshire, TS5 7JX; England; 54.54320°N 1.24460°W

Information
- Type: Community
- Closed: 2010
- Local authority: Middlesbrough
- Specialist: Arts College
- Department for Education URN: 111722 Tables
- Ofsted: Reports
- Chair: Debbie Bivan
- Gender: Mixed
- Age: 11 to 16
- Enrolment: 690
- Website: http://www.hallgarth.middlesbrough.sch.uk/

Hall Garth Community Arts College, originally Hall Garth School, was a secondary school in Acklam, Middlesbrough, North Yorkshire, England.

The students of the school came from areas with higher than average levels of socio-economic deprivation. The number of students from minority ethnic groups, and those with learning difficulties and disabilities, were well above average.

In 2000, it became a performing arts school and, in 2007, was renamed to Hall Garth Community Arts College from Hall Garth School.

== Fatal stabbing incident ==
Hall Garth was the scene of a fatal stabbing, on 28 March 1994, when Stephen Wilkinson burst into a maths classroom and stabbed several children including 12-year-old Nikki Conroy who died from her injuries. In October 2003 a permanent police presence was established on site. Wilkinson was subsequently convicted of manslaughter and was sentenced to indefinite detention at a psychiatric hospital. A school memorial garden was opened for Nikki, in March 2004.

== Anti-bullying initiatives ==
The school established several initiatives in order to tackle bullying. The students made a video of an anti-bullying theatre performance in December 2004. Then in May 2005 the school hired an anti-bullying co-ordinator and set up a peer support group of older pupils.

== Closure ==
Hall Garth Community Arts College and King's Manor School formally closed in 2010 and were replaced with Oakfields Community College.
