= Isherwood baronets =

Extinct baronetcy in the Baronetage of the United Kingdom

The Isherwood Baronetcy, of Raggles Wood, Chislehurst, in the County of Kent, was a title in the Baronetage of the United Kingdom. It was created on 20 June 1921 for the naval architect Joseph Isherwood. The title became extinct on the death of the second Baronet in 1946.

== Isherwood baronets, of Raggles Wood (1921) ==
- Sir Joseph William Isherwood, 1st Baronet (1870–1937) buried at St Mary's, West Acklam (within the grounds of Acklam Hall).
- Sir William Isherwood, 2nd Baronet 1898–1946) buried at St Luke's, Bromley, Kent

Coat of arms of Isherwood baronets

Crest
A lymphad sails furled Sable surmounted by a rainbow Proper.
Escutcheon
Argent a fess dancetee Azure between three rudders Proper.
Motto
Perficio Cursuili (I Accomplish My Course)
