= Stainsby, North Yorkshire =

Former village in Yorkshire, England

Stainsby
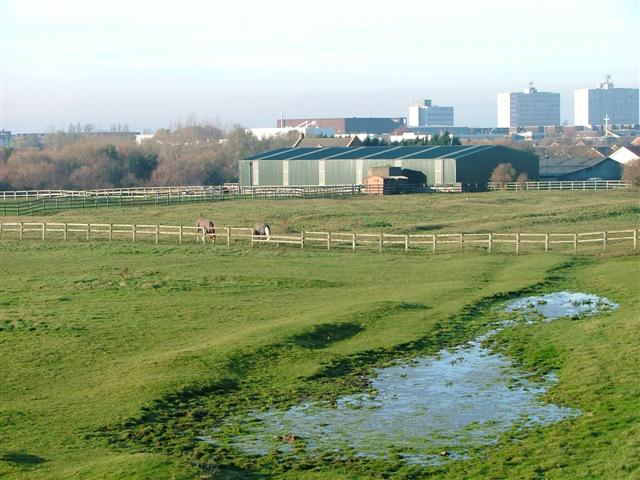
- Viewed from the south-east

- Location within North Yorkshire
- 54.5337°N 1.2821°W
- Location: Acklam, Middlesbrough
- OS grid reference: NZ 465 157

Scheduled monument
- Designated: 27 October 1970
- Reference no.: 1016352

Stainsby, in North Yorkshire, England, is an abandoned village near the Acklam suburb of Middlesbrough and town of Thornaby. Little more than mounds near the A19 road are now visible. The site is a scheduled monument.

Stainsby Grange Farm, Stainsby Hall Farm and Stainsby Hill Farm retain the former village's name. Stainsby Beck forms part of the Stockton-on-Tees and Middlesbrough borough boundary. Nearby Acklam Grange School was formerly named Stainsby.

== History ==
Stainsby was recorded in the Domesday Book of 1086, as being three carucates. Walter de Stainsby held the village from 1284 to 1303; from 1388 to 1566 it followed the descent of the manor of Picton; from about 1800 it was held by the Earl of Harewood.

Records of 1302 show that nine inhabitants were eligible to pay taxes. It is not known how or when the village became deserted. The earliest map of the settlement, of 1757, shows Stainsby Grange Farm as the only building.

During the Second World War, a Type 22 pillbox was built on the site, as part of the defences for Thornaby Aerodrome nearby; it is included in the scheduling of the monument. The A19 road, planned in 1969, lies immediately to the east of the site, having been routed to avoid the medieval village.

== Earthworks ==
The earthworks lie to the south and south-east of Stainsby Grange Farm. They were surveyed in 1996 by Tees Archaeology. It was found to be a toft village: there were two rows, arranged north to south, of large enclosures, or tofts, each measuring about 50 by 35 metres (164 by 115 ft), separated by shallow ditches. The front of each enclosure would have contained the main farm building, and behind was a space for growing food or for livestock. There was a trackway between the two rows, running through the settlement. To the west of the tofts, a linear, hollow feature is thought to be a back lane. A large circular depression at the north of the site is interpreted as a pond.

To the west and east of the village there is the ridge and furrow pattern of medieval ploughing, the remains of the open-field system formerly around the village.

== See also ==
- List of lost settlements in the United Kingdom
- 'Stainsby Girls' – Chris Rea song
