= King's Manor School =

Coordinates: 54.543°N 1.246°W

Location
- Hall Drive; Middlesbrough, North Yorkshire, TS5 7JY; England

Information
- Established: 1974 from a school founded in 1935
- Closed: 2010
- Local authority: Middlesbrough
- Department for Education URN: 111737 Tables
- Ofsted: Reports
- Chair of Governors: Alistair Bolton
- Headteacher: John Robson
- Gender: Mixed
- Age: 11 to 16
- Enrolment: 913
- Website: http://www.kingsmanor.org.uk

King's Manor School was a secondary school in Acklam, Middlesbrough, England. It merged with Hall Garth Community Arts College in 2010 to create Oakfields Community College.

== History ==
King's Manor School was formed in 1974 by a split of Acklam High School into an 11-16 School, with the balance forming Acklam 6th Form College. Acklam High School had a history as a boys school from 1935, when it was founded as Acklam Hall School at Acklam Hall. It was later a boys grammar school, Aklam Grammar School, and in 1967 merged with Kirby Girls’ Grammar School to form the co-educational Acklam High School.

King's Manor School and Acklam 6th Form College shared accommodation at the existing Acklam High School site, Acklam Manor House. However, the main school block later burnt down and King's Manor School moved to Hall Garth School, merging with that school in 2010.

== Subjects taught ==
The school taught a range of subjects and as a Specialist sports colleges it was particularly known for the quality of its facilities for Physical Education.

== Houses ==
As a Specialist Sports College, the school was involved in a project called the Aspiring Sports College Project (ASCOP) and eventually became a national demonstration site. The project aimed to raise student aspirations through listening to their views and ideas and giving them a sense of belonging to the school. It was this work which led to the House system launch in 2005; the school was divided into houses named after the ships of the local hero Captain James Cook:

- Resolution: "Aim to be the best"
- Endeavour: "Endeavour to Succeed"
- Adventure: "Have a great deal of fun"
- Discovery: "Discover your potential"

In line with a general trend for schools to listen more to the views of students, the concept of "student voice" at King's Manor was used to allow students to help review the way that houses and subjects operated and how teaching and learning was delivered.
