= Middlesbrough Hydraulic Clock Tower =

Listed building in North Yorkshire, England

Coordinates: 54°34′52″N 1°13′27″W

The Middlesbrough Hydraulic Clock Tower is a Grade II* listed building at Middlesbrough Dock in Middlesbrough, North Yorkshire, England. It contains two large cast-iron tanks that formerly powered the dock gates, cranes and other machinery. The tower was also used as a navigational aid and was restored in 2005.

== History ==
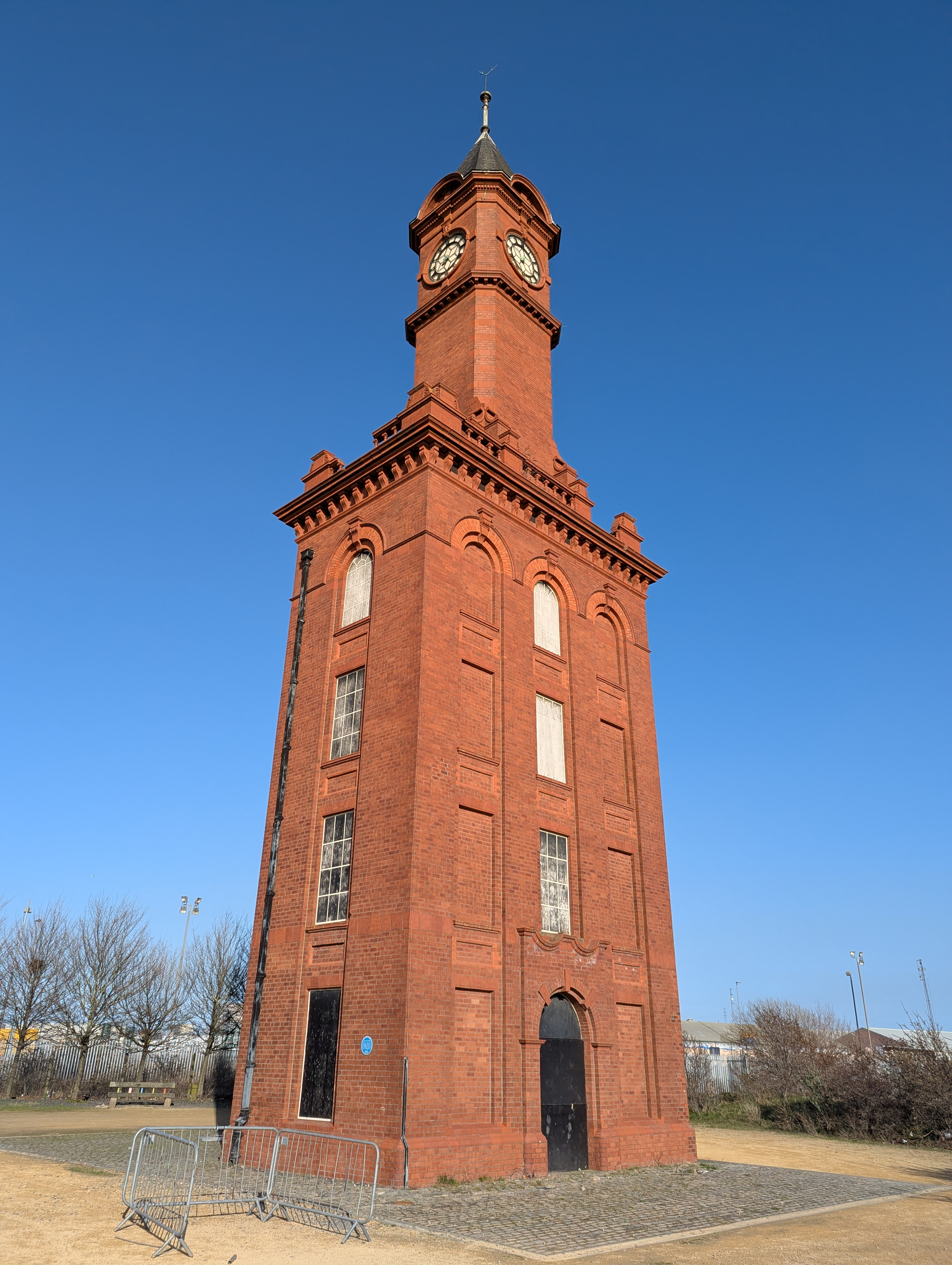
Middlesbrough Hydraulic Clock Tower from a side angle

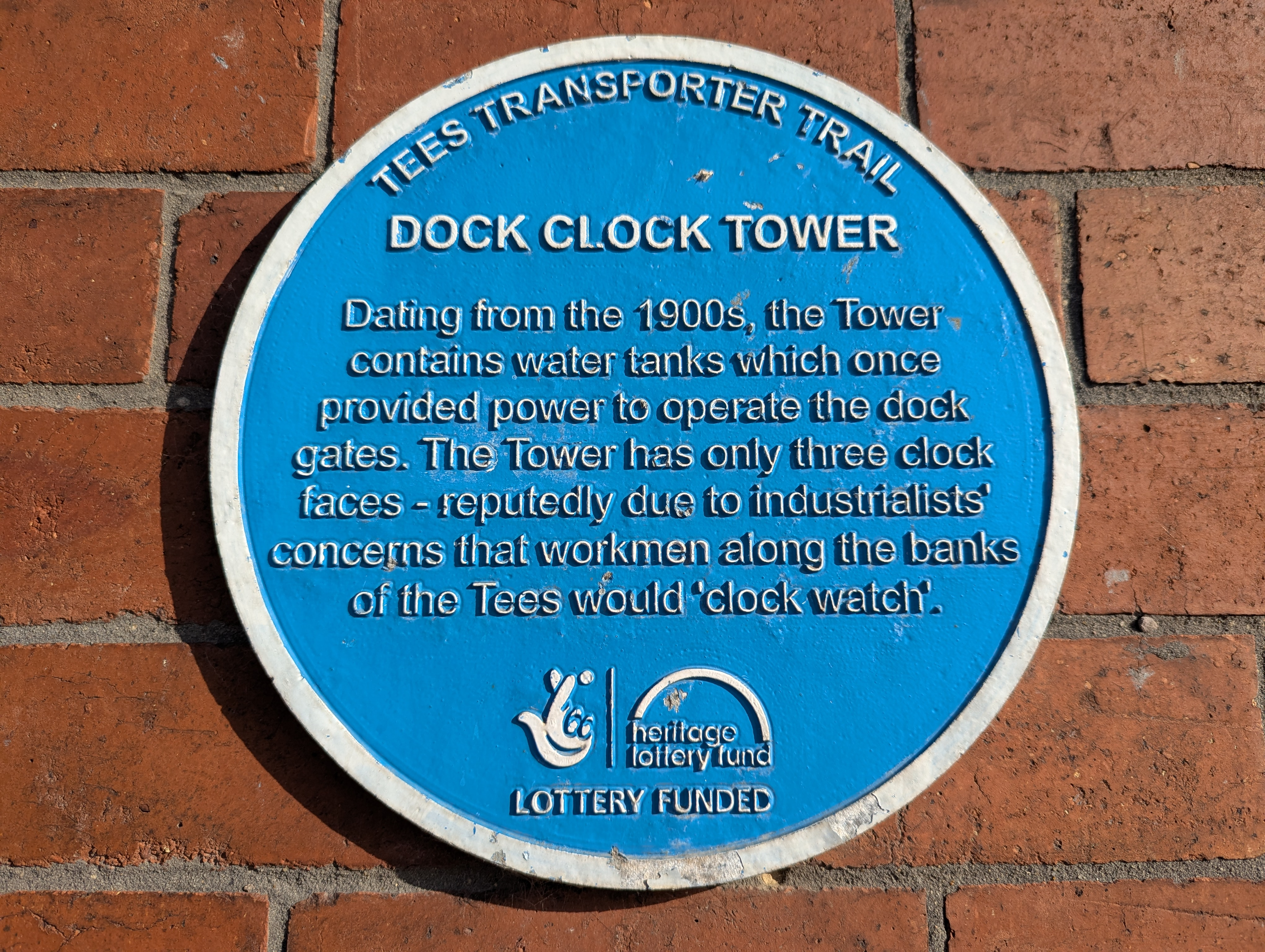
The lottery fund plaque found on the tower

The current hydraulic clock tower was originally thought to have been built c. 1870. However, more recent sources suggest it was likely built in 1903.

The building is no longer in use, but retains two large cast iron tanks that would have powered the dock gates, cranes, and other machinery. Due to its size and visibility it was also used as a navigational aid along the river. Only three sides of the clock tower feature a clock face, the leading theory is that this is due to the industrialists concerns that dock workers would clock watch.

A prior hydraulic clock tower existed roughly 200m away from the current site. It was originally built in either 1846 or 1847. It was demolished due to the relocation of the dock entrance and expansion of the site.

It is believed to have been designed by the North Eastern Railway architect department, however Historic England lists Philip Webb as the architect. The steelworks was owned by the Bell Brothers. One of the directors, Sir Hugh Bell was also a director at the North Eastern railway, and three times mayor of Middlesbrough.

In 1999 the clock tower was designated as a Grade II* listed building, and in 2005 it was restored.

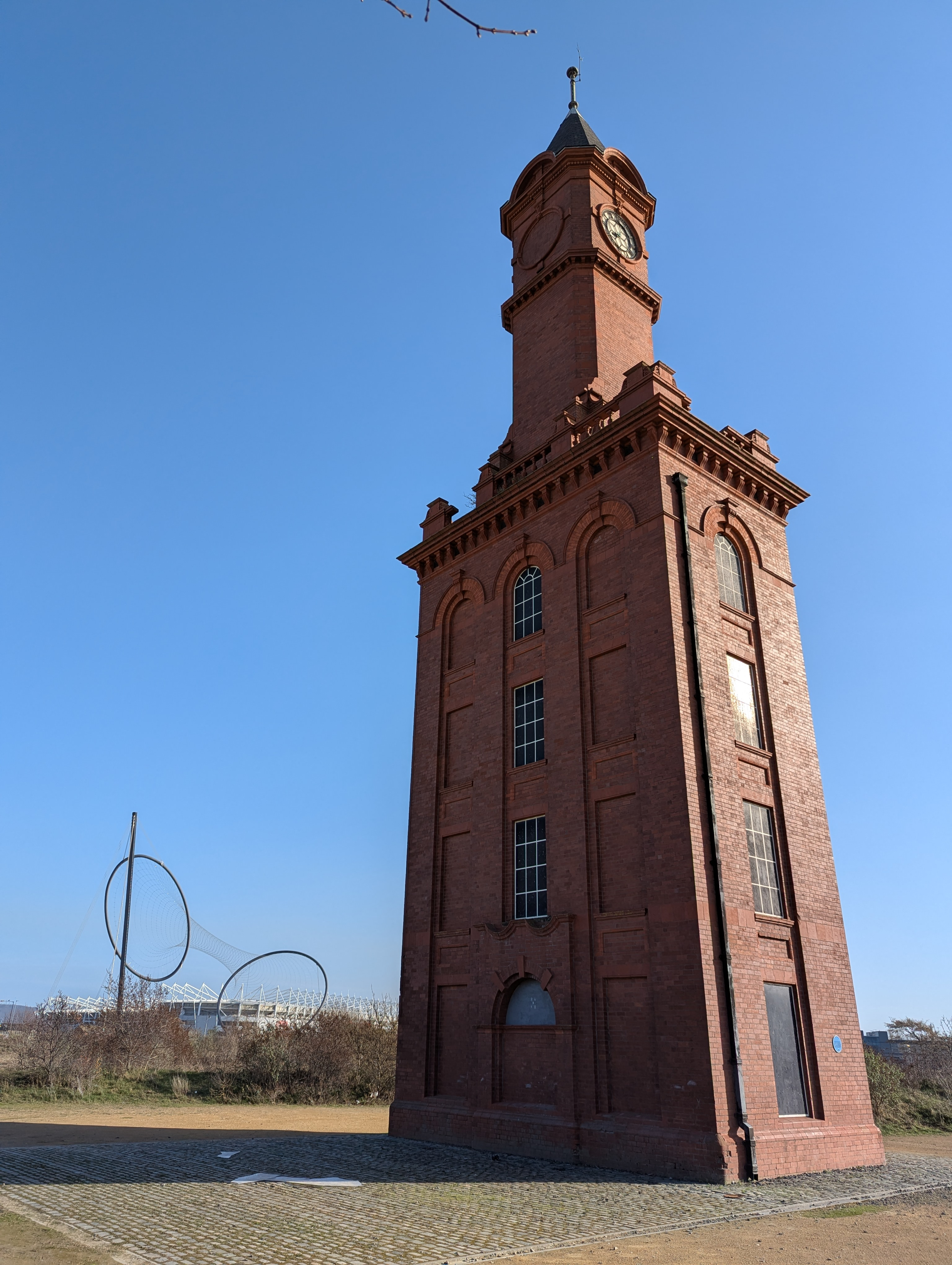
Showing the side of the tower without a clock face

== Architecture ==
It features red engineering brick with red sandstone and terracotta dressings with a Welsh Slate roof. The interior of the building features 4 floors.

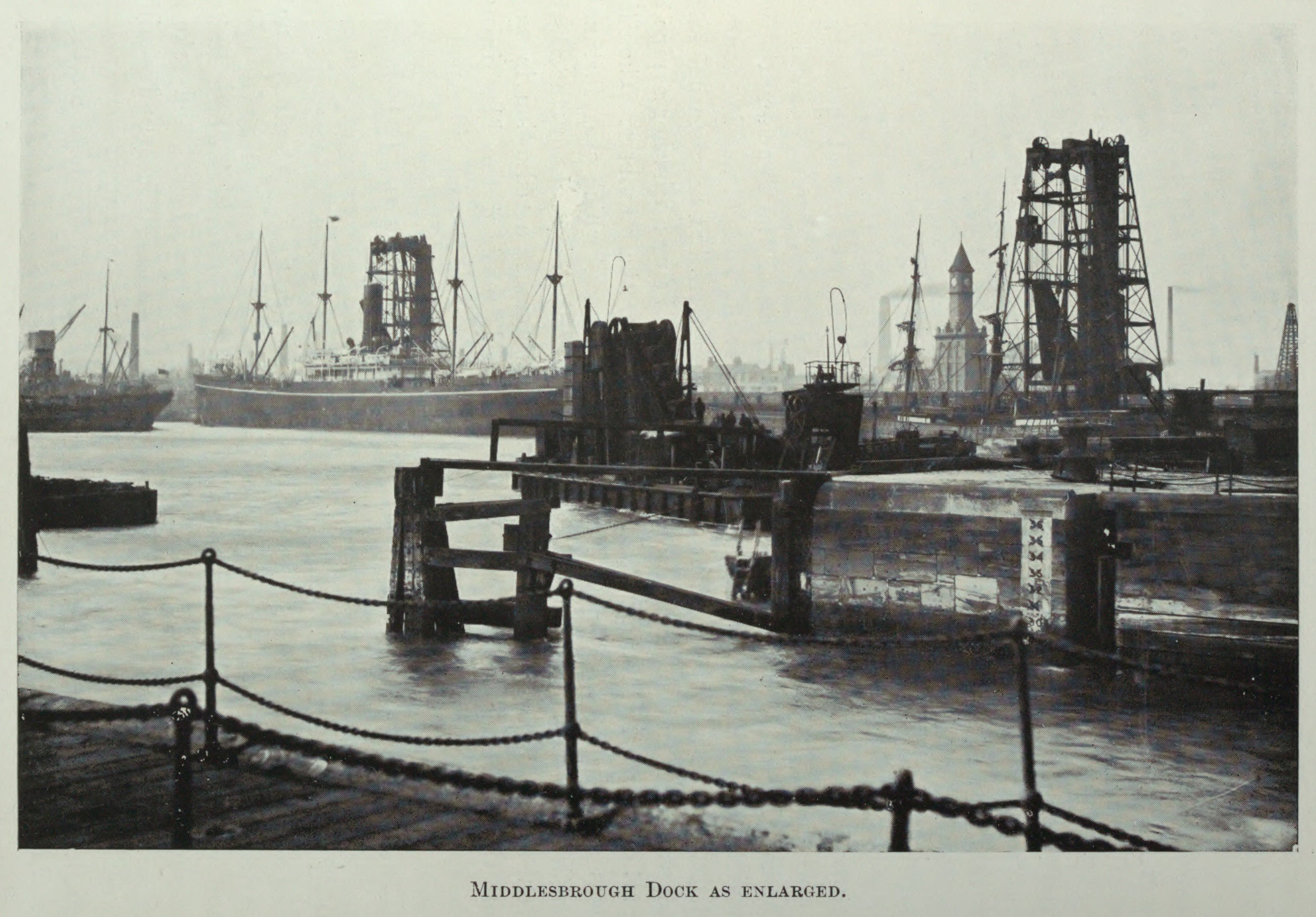
Middlesbrough docks

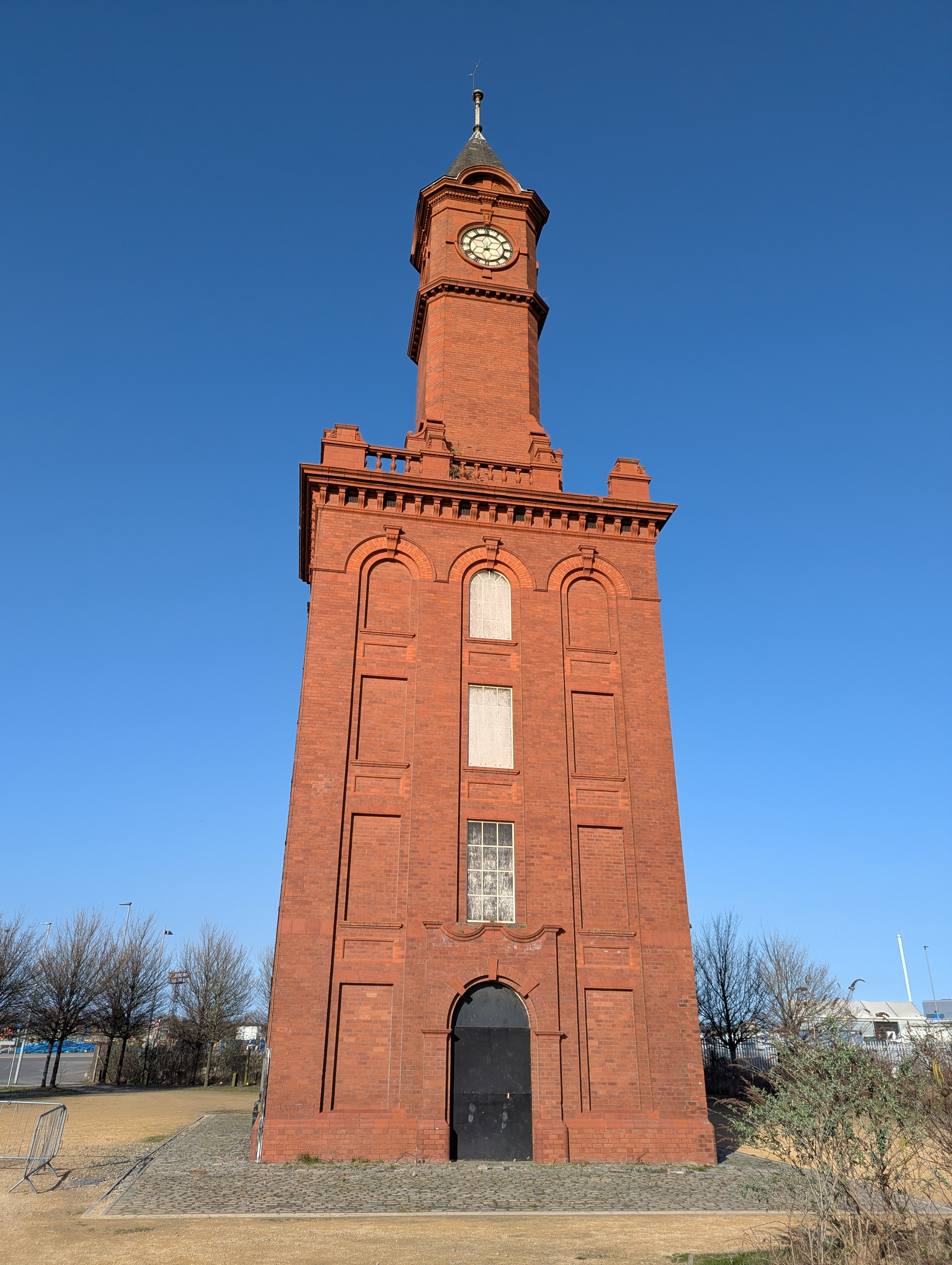
The front face of the Middlesbrough Hydraulic Clock Tower
