= Acklam Hall =

Mansion in Middlesbrough, North Yorkshire, England

Coordinates: 54.5457°N 1.2484°W

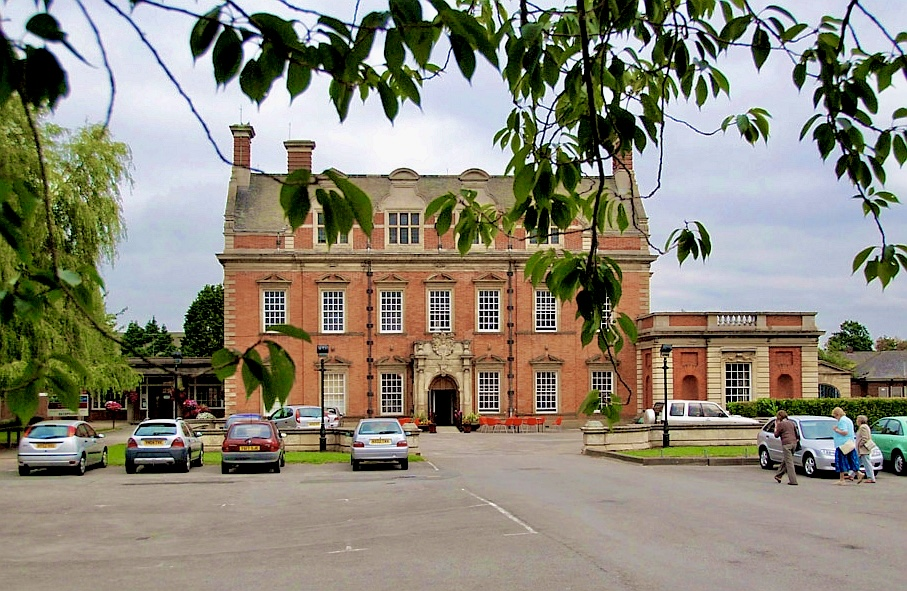
- Acklam Hall in 2007
- Interactive map of the Acklam Hall area

General information
- Location: England
- Completed: 1680–83
- Owner: Acklam Hall Ltd

Website
- https://www.acklamhall.co.uk

Listed Building – Grade I
- Designated: 24 June 1983
- Reference no.: 1136868

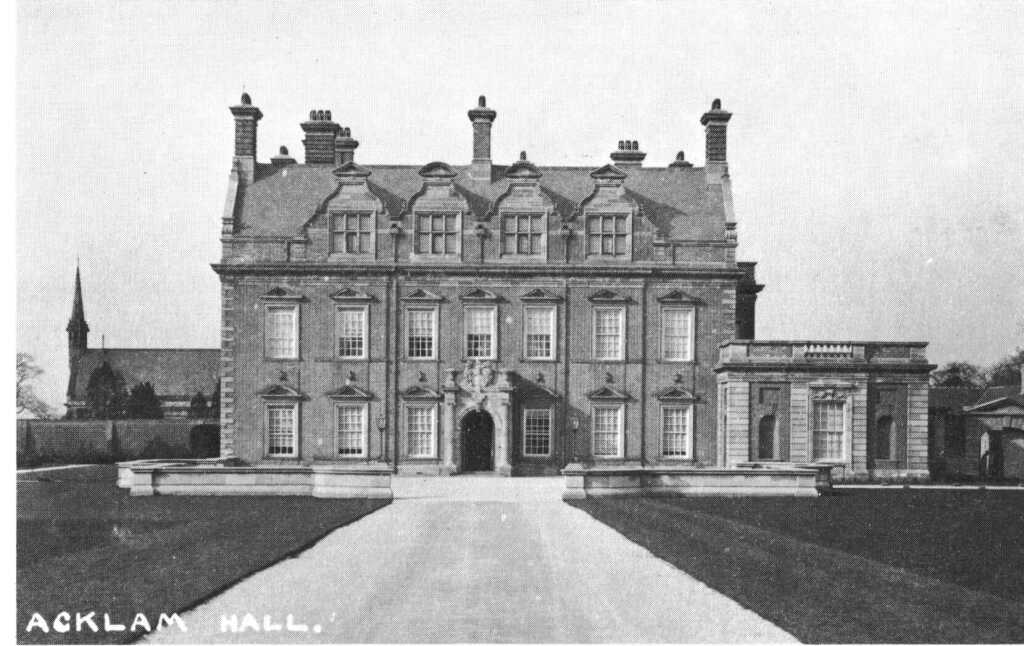
Postcard view of Acklam Hall c. 1913

Acklam Hall is a Restoration mansion in the former village, and now suburb, of Acklam in Middlesbrough, North Yorkshire, England. It is a Grade I listed building.

== History ==
It was built by William Hustler between 1680 and 1683. A long-held, albeit unverified family tradition claimed that the Hall was visited by a royal progress by King Charles II in 1684. The Hall was extended in 1845 and 1910–12. It continued to house the Hustlers until the conceding of ownership to Middlesbrough Corporation in 1928. After 1935 it was in public ownership and has been used as a grammar school and a comprehensive school, known as Kings Manor School, with the addition of several modern buildings to the grounds. It was then owned by Middlesbrough Council. Middlesbrough College inherited the site and continued to use it as a college building.

== House and gardens ==
Internally the building features a main staircase with balustrade carved in spirals and helixes with pomegranate newel posts . The ceilings in the front part of the house have many stucco decorations of wreaths and fruit and some suspended griffons. There is a lantern window in the roof at the top of the staircase. The front room in the second storey spans the width of the house. It was probably a reception/ballroom originally, and has served various functions in education. It was the Assembly Hall for Acklam Hall Grammar School until the opening of the new hall around 1958. It then became the school's main library. Subsequently, the library moved to a new building, later demolished, and the space became the staff common room.

In front of the hall stretches the Avenue of Trees (as it is known locally), with two rows of large oak trees forming a corridor which was likely to have been the route by which visitors originally approached the Hall. These trees stretch from Acklam Road to Hall Drive (immediately in front of the Hall) – a distance of around 0.5 miles.

== Architectural details ==
The coat of arms of the Hustler family can be seen above the main door, with the figure of a Talbot on top. This extinct breed of hunting dog became the emblem of Acklam Hall Grammar School. The front door has a short portico.

== Acklam Hall today ==
Middlesbrough Council revealed plans in 2011 to sell the hall to developers. Controversially the Council sold the hall and land for £900,000, when other valuations put its worth at £4,000,000. As of 2016, the council had only received £120,000 of the money it was owed. In 2014, Acklam Hall Ltd, which now owns the hall, confirmed that the building would be developed as a wedding venue with small spa, gym, conference rooms and a restaurant. The possibility of a medical centre and nursing home were also considered for the site. The financing of this would be offset against the building of 56 new houses, to the east and west of the hall, by Taylor Wimpey. The building is now used as a weddings and corporate events centre.

== Image gallery ==
The following images were taken during an "open house" held in September 2007.

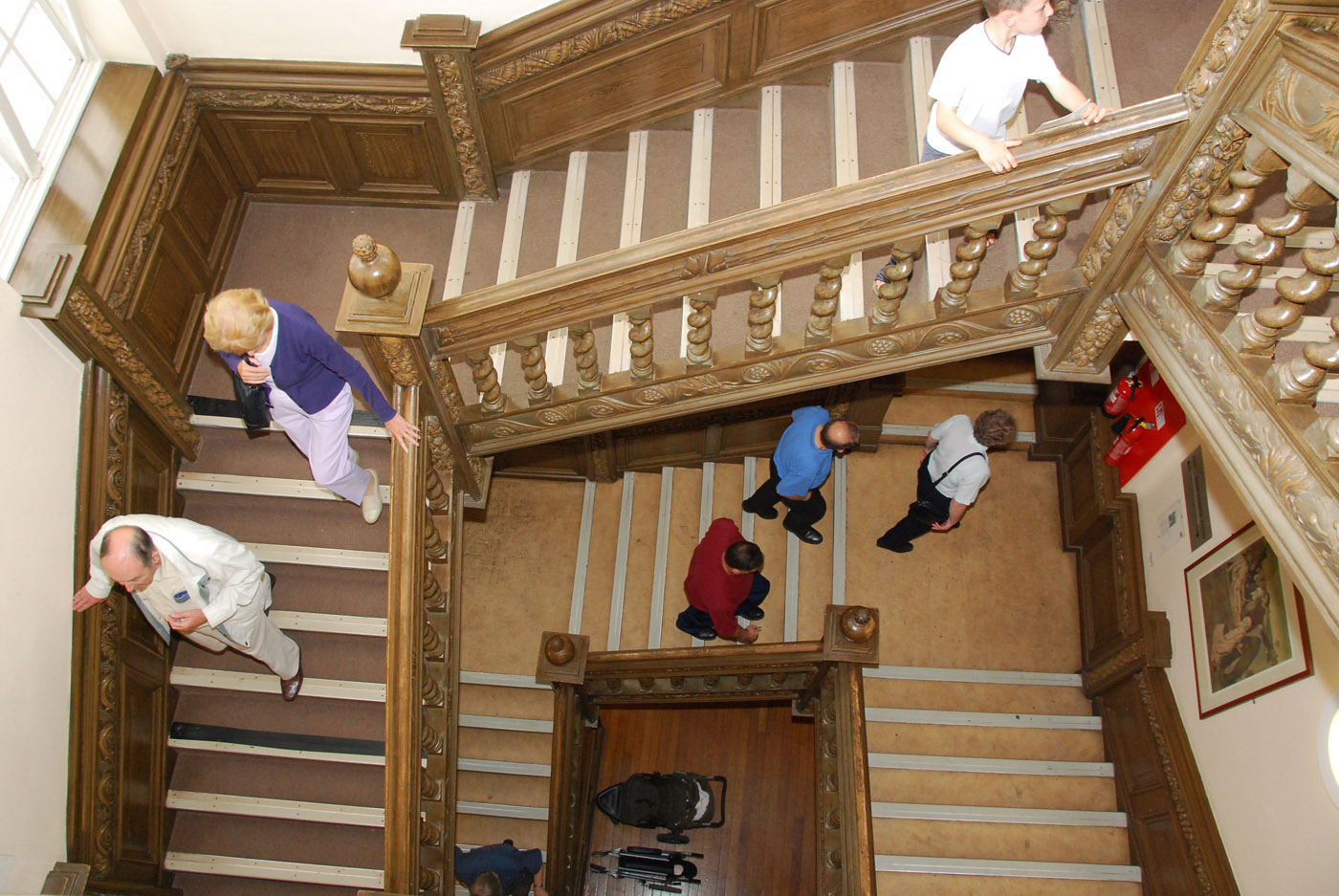
The main staircase seen from the top passageway.

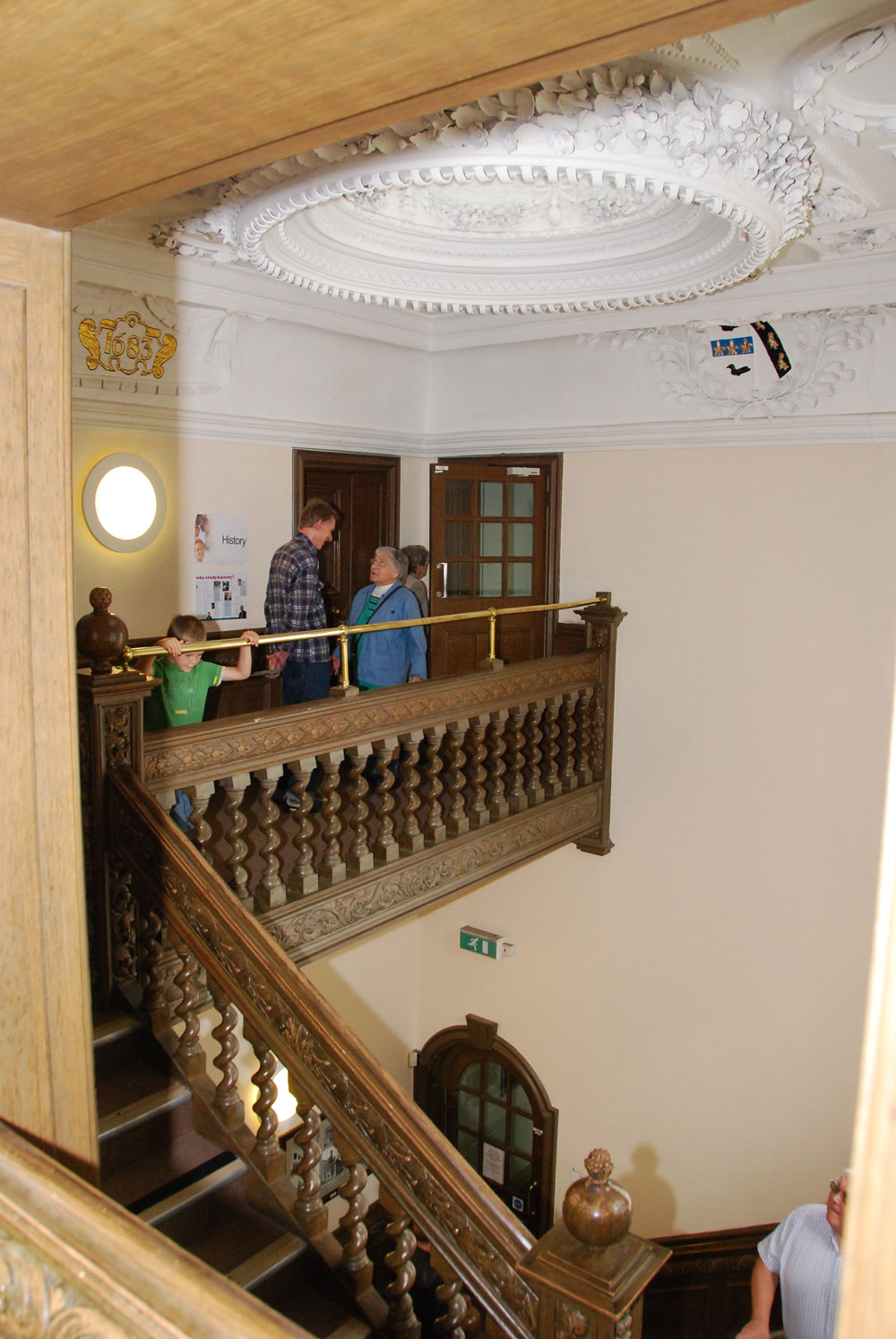
The main staircase and the top passageway.

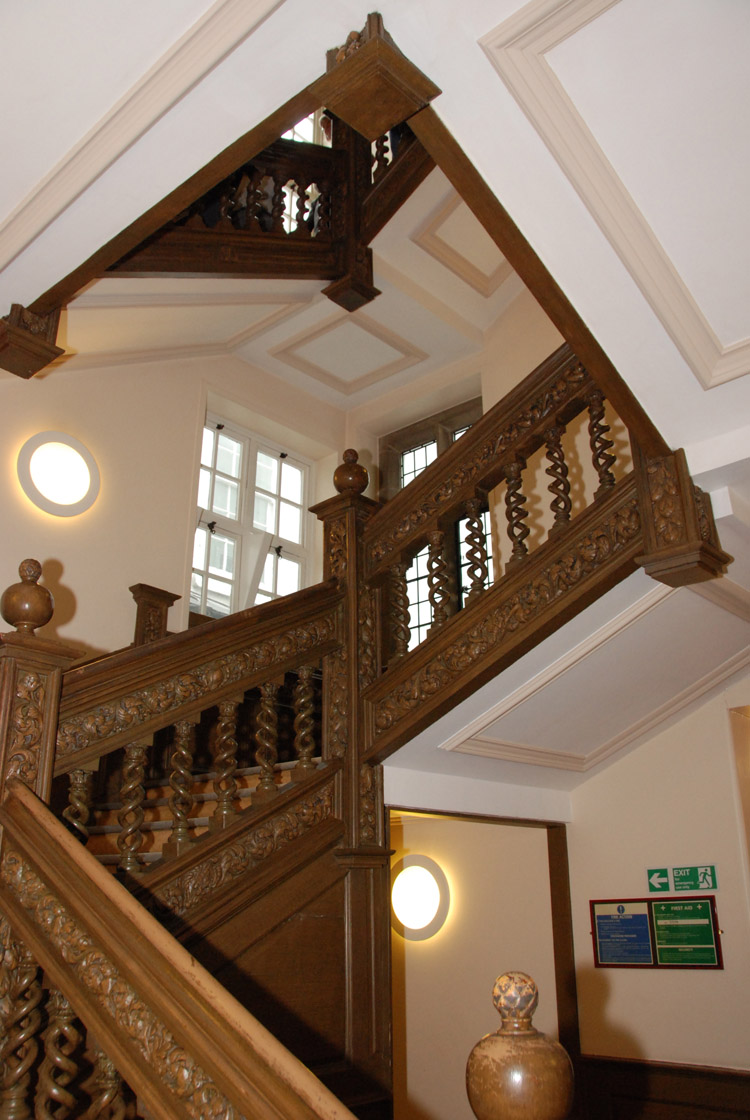
The main staircase from the ground floor showing the open helices in the balustrade.

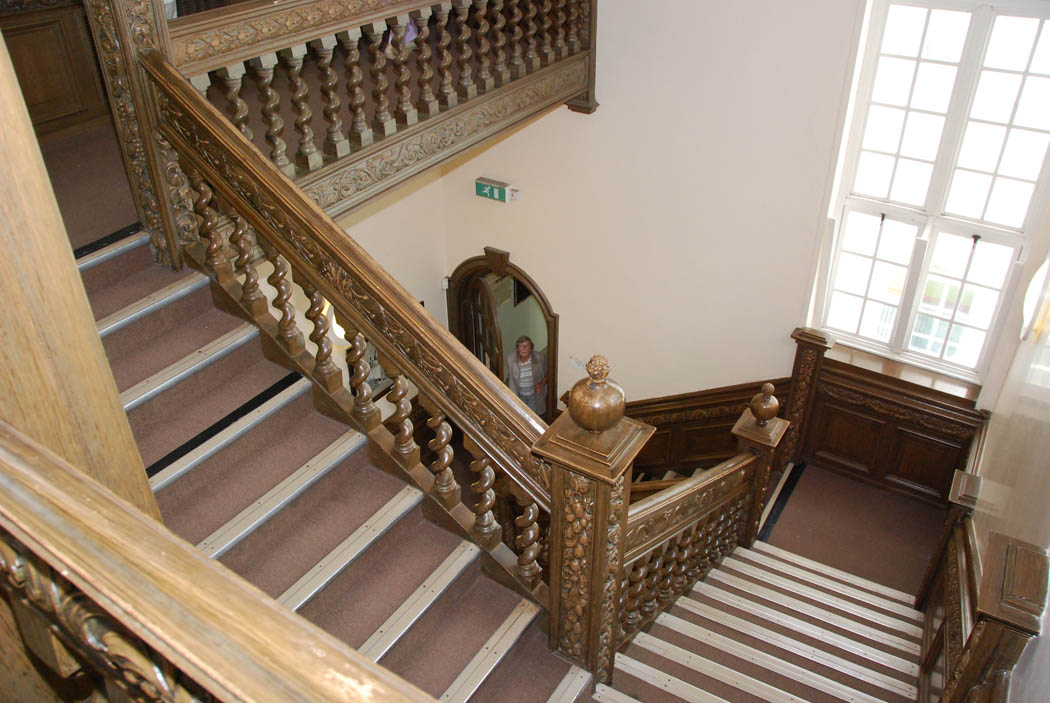
The main staircase showing the filled helix balustrade used in the upper floors.

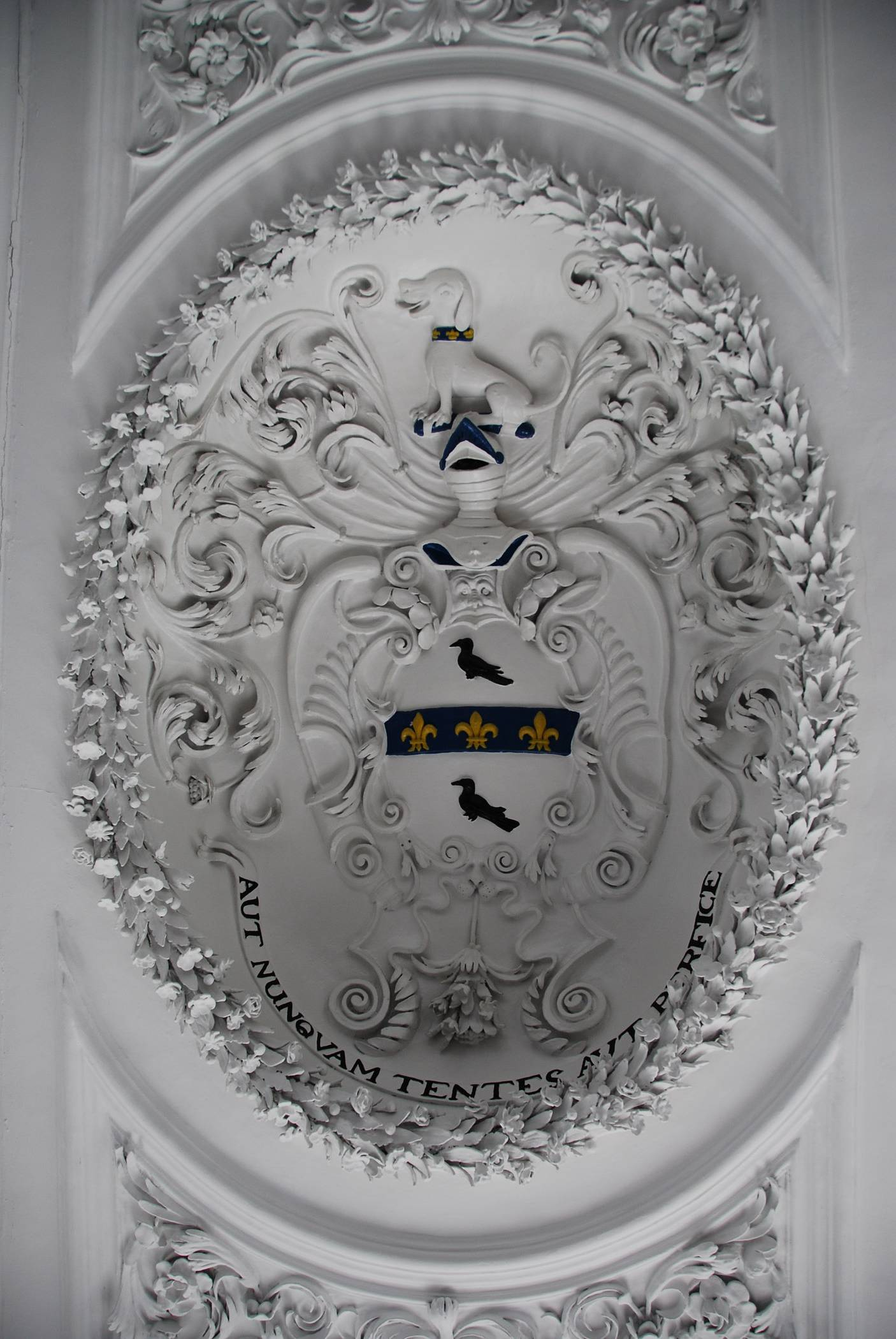
The Hustler family coat of arms seen as part of the stucco ceiling decoration.

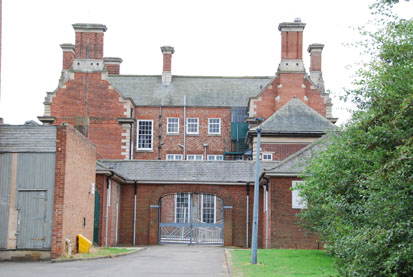
Rear view of the building.

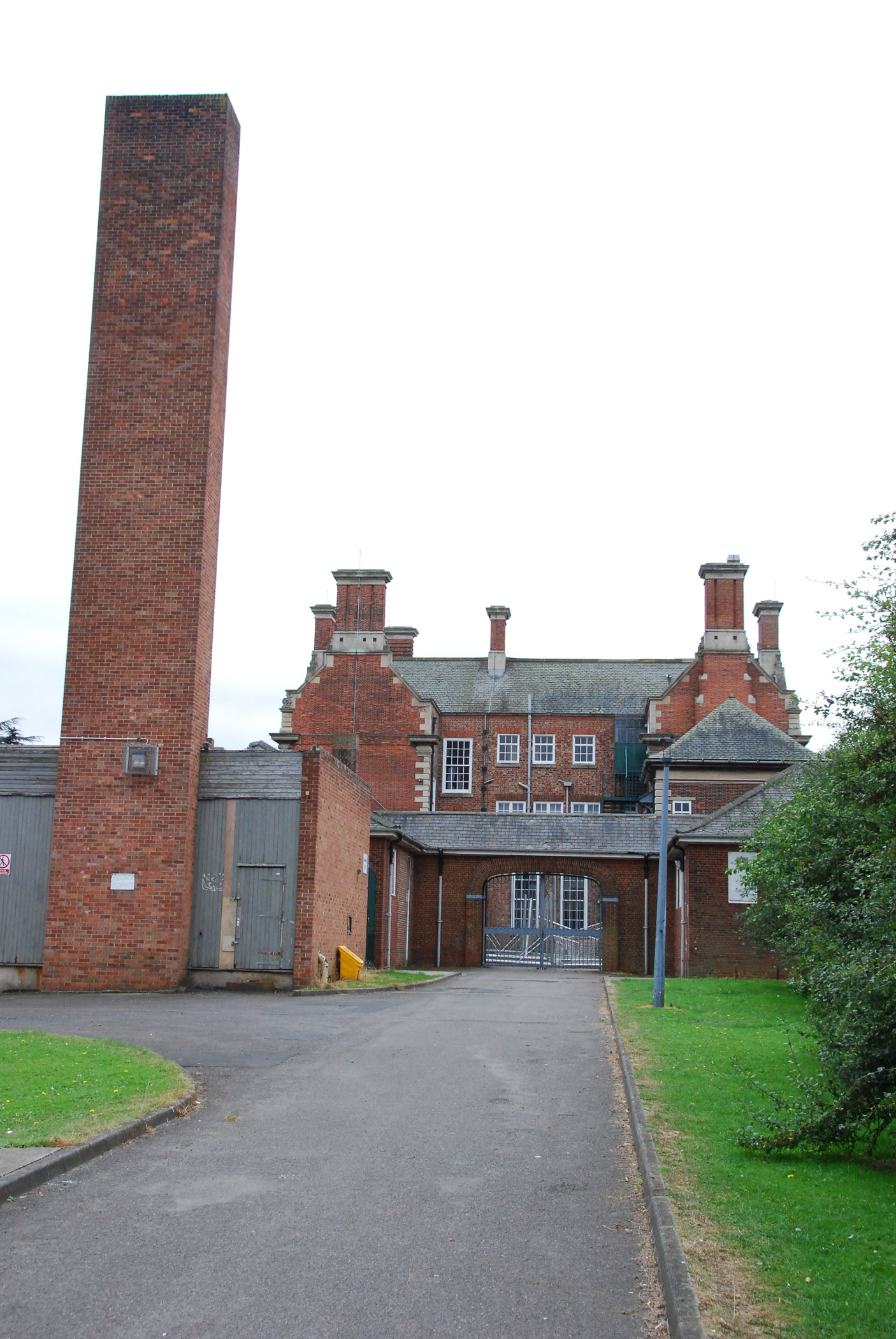
Rear view of the building.

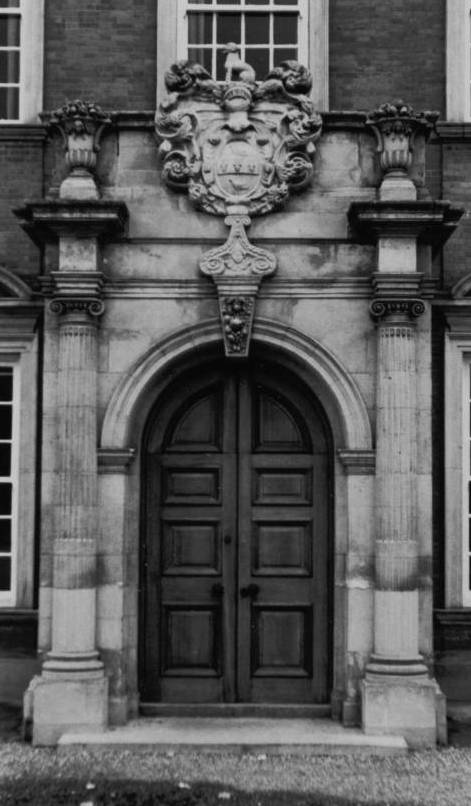
Front Door of House.

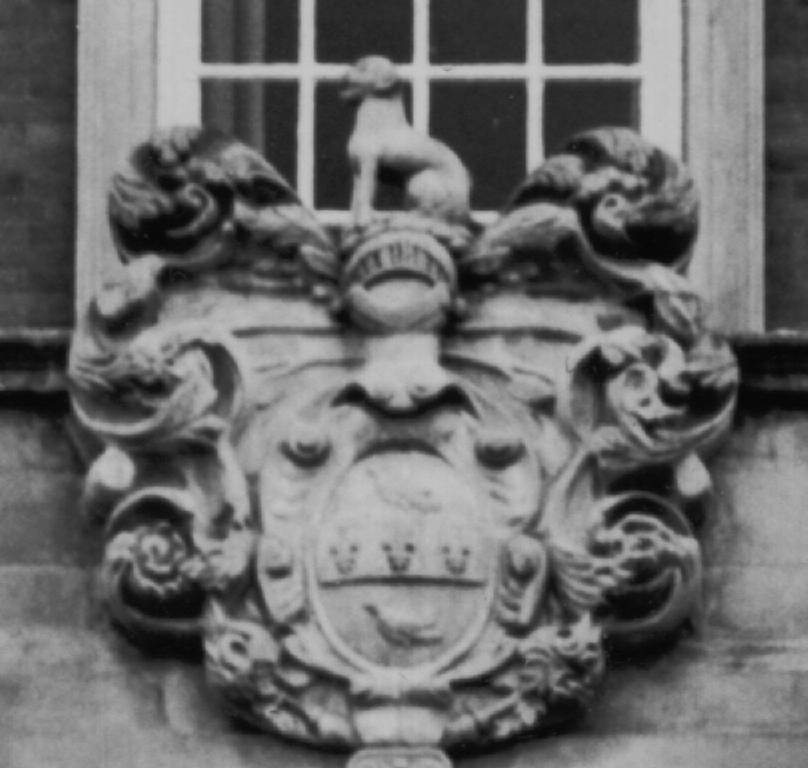
Arms above front door.

These images, taken at the same time, show the neglected state of some of the early 20th century buildings attached to the Hall, and of the East Quad.

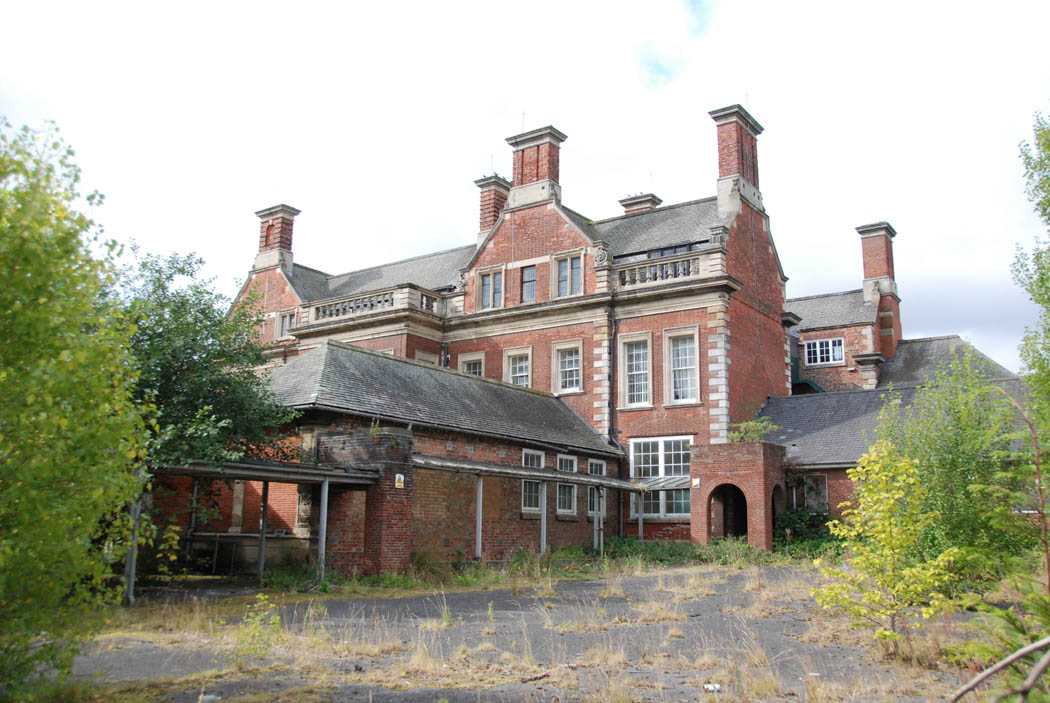

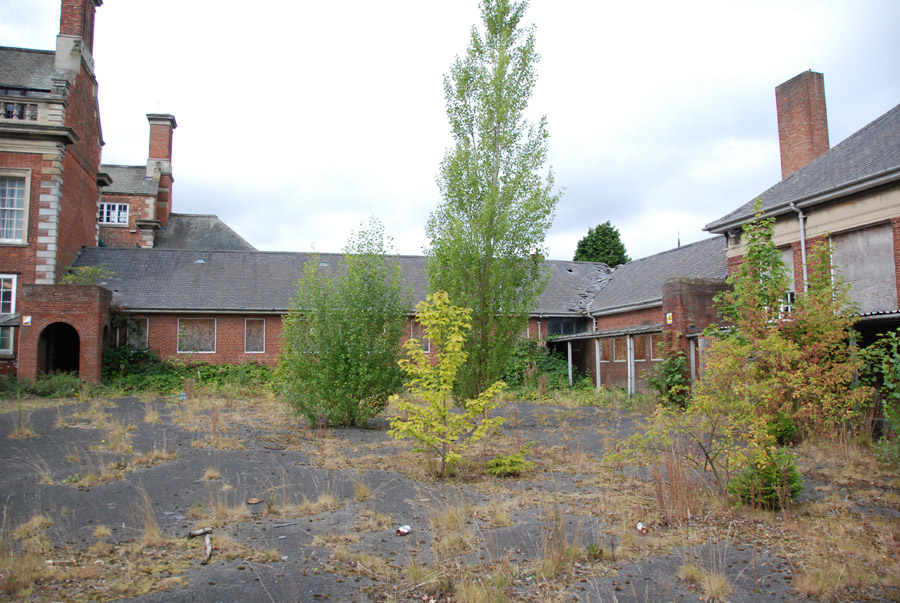

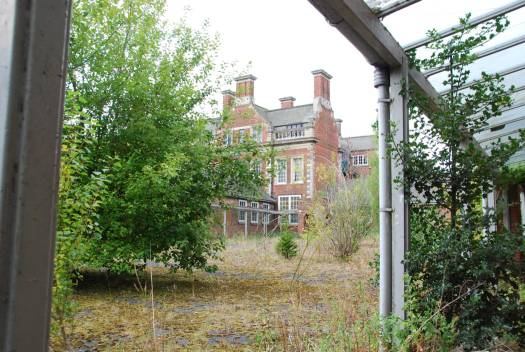
