= Acklam, Middlesbrough =

Area of Middlesbrough, North Yorkshire, England

Coordinates: 54.544°N 1.251°W

Acklam
- Ward
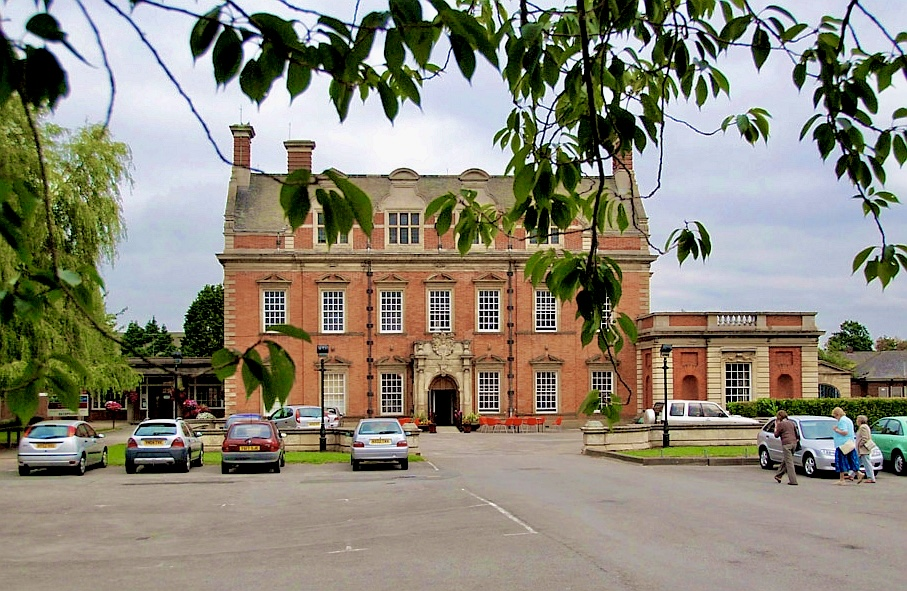
- Acklam Hall

- Location within North Yorkshire
- Population: 6,027 (2011)
- OS grid reference: NZ485168
- Unitary authority: Middlesbrough
- Ceremonial county: North Yorkshire
- Region: North East
- Country: England
- Sovereign state: United Kingdom
- Post town: MIDDLESBROUGH
- Postcode district: TS5
- Dialling code: 01642
- Police: Cleveland
- Fire: Cleveland
- Ambulance: North East
- UK Parliament: Middlesbrough and Thornaby East
- Councillors: Luke Henman (Lab); Tom Livingstone (LD)

Acklam is a neighbourhood and electoral ward in Middlesbrough, Borough of Middlesbrough, North Yorkshire, England. It is believed that the settlement is Anglo-Saxon in origin, the name is Old English for "place at the oak clearings" or "place of oaks". Acklam was an ancient parish, formerly known as West Acklam to distinguish it from Acklam in Ryedale. At the 2011 census, the Acklam Ward had a population of 6,027. It is in the TS5 postcode area with Ayresome, Brookfield, Linthorpe, parts of Newport and Whinney Banks.

== History ==
=== Manor of 1068 ===
Acklam was referred to as "Aclun" in the 1086 Domesday Book. A precursor to a civil parish, the 'manor' was eleven gold-taxed ploughlands, they would have been eleven settlements in the area. This manor's area had previously been owned by Earl Siward with the area passed to Hugh Earl of Chester in 1086.

This manor's jurisdiction extended to over 24 plough-lands including Coulby farm, Hemlington, Stainton, Thornton, Maltby and Thornaby. Also listed were the later abandoned Stainsby, Barwick-on-Tees and Cold Ingleby, the latter two part of present Ingleby Barwick.

=== Overlords (1068 to 1488) ===
In the Manor area, Robert Malet had a ploughland and the king also had 3 ploughlands, royal lands included in Robert de Brus’ fee-ing. When Malet's son died in a pub, the White Ship, around 1120 meant all lands went to the king.

An agreement between Whitby Abbey and Guisborough Priory, by 1138, mentions the 4 ploughlands in Acklam held by the line of Robert de Bruces. Last in the line of Brus, Robert I of Scotland, in 1279 held a knight's fee of half a ploughland along with three parts of a knight's fee between 1284 and 1285.

Over-lording of Acklam came to Lucy de Marmaduke (née Brus), Lucy de Thweng and, in 1346, to Lucy and John Darcy. Acklam passed down the Darcy line until Sir Richard Strangways, son of Lucy and John's great-great-granddaughter Elizabeth, overlorded until his death in 1488. Thomas Boynton had gained powers as lord and tenant from Richard, upon Richards death overlordship ended.

=== Lords (1086 to 1460/1) ===
Hugh son of Norman, Earl Hugh's tenant in 1086, was thought to be succeeded by Alvered, or Alfred, in about 1120. Roger, son of Alvered's grandson, William de Acklam had two daughters. Joan was sole heir after her sister's death:

- Joan married Ingram de Boynton.
- Their heir, William de Boynton, in 1284–5 was lord and had been living in Acklam since at least 1256.
- Ingram, William's son had become lord by 1303.
- Son Walter followed, until 1340,
- Thomas and Katherine 1365
- Sir Thomas Boynton II, succeeded in 1402
- Thomas's son, Henry, was executed three years later for joining the Percy rebellion.

The manor area was merged with Kirk Leavington, under Roger Thornton and was in his possession in 1428, later reverting to the Boynton line:

- William, Henry's second son, is said to have held the area after the death of his brother Thomas.

=== Land holder (1460/1 to 1637) ===
In 1460-1 Thomas son of Thomas, also heir of William, died as lord of Acklam.

- From his son Henry, who was dead in 1495, the manor came in direct line to Henry's grandson Matthew, seised at his death in 1540, when he left a son Thomas, aged three.
- Thomas was succeeded in January 1581 or 1582 by his son and heir Francis, lord in 1613 and thought to last until 1617.
- Twenty years later Acklam was sold by his son Sir Matthew Boynton, baronet, to William Hustler.

To the west of the current Acklam area, the then village of Stainsby was deserted by 1757. Today this site amounts to little more than a series of grassy mounds near the A19 road.

=== Absorption into Middlesbrough ===
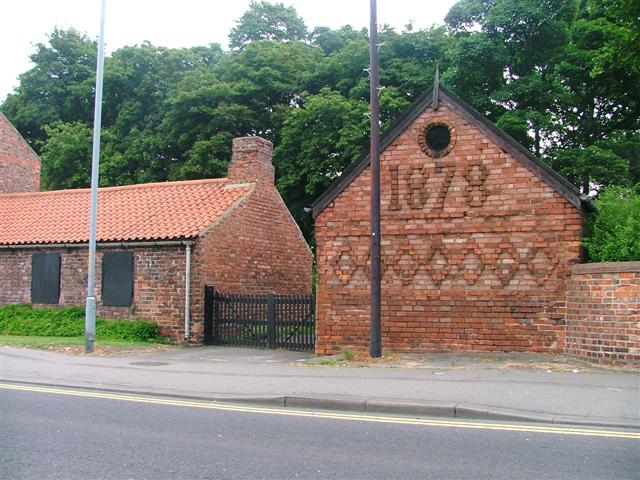
Former blacksmiths on Acklam Road

Part of the parish of West Acklam was included in the municipal borough of Middlesbrough from 1866, the rest being in Middlesbrough Rural District. The parish of West Acklam was finally abolished on 1 April 1932 and merged with Middlesbrough, parts also went to Hemlington and Marton, and the rest of the area was also incorporated into Middlesbrough district. In 1931 the parish had a population of 287.

== Geography ==
Acklam is situated in West Middlesbrough, and encloses smaller estates such as Kader, And Trimdon Avenue Estate. Acklam Road runs directly through Acklam, and just off Acklam Road is Hall Drive. The previous focus of the parish was the residence of the Hustler family, the Restoration mansion of Acklam Hall, this is shown in maps of the pre-industrial area—such as the 1714 Lordship of Acklam Plan—in the nearby Dorman Museum in Linthorpe. The house, formerly a grammar school and Middlesbrough's sole Grade I listed building, had ceased to be the Acklam Campus of Middlesbrough College by the middle of 2008.

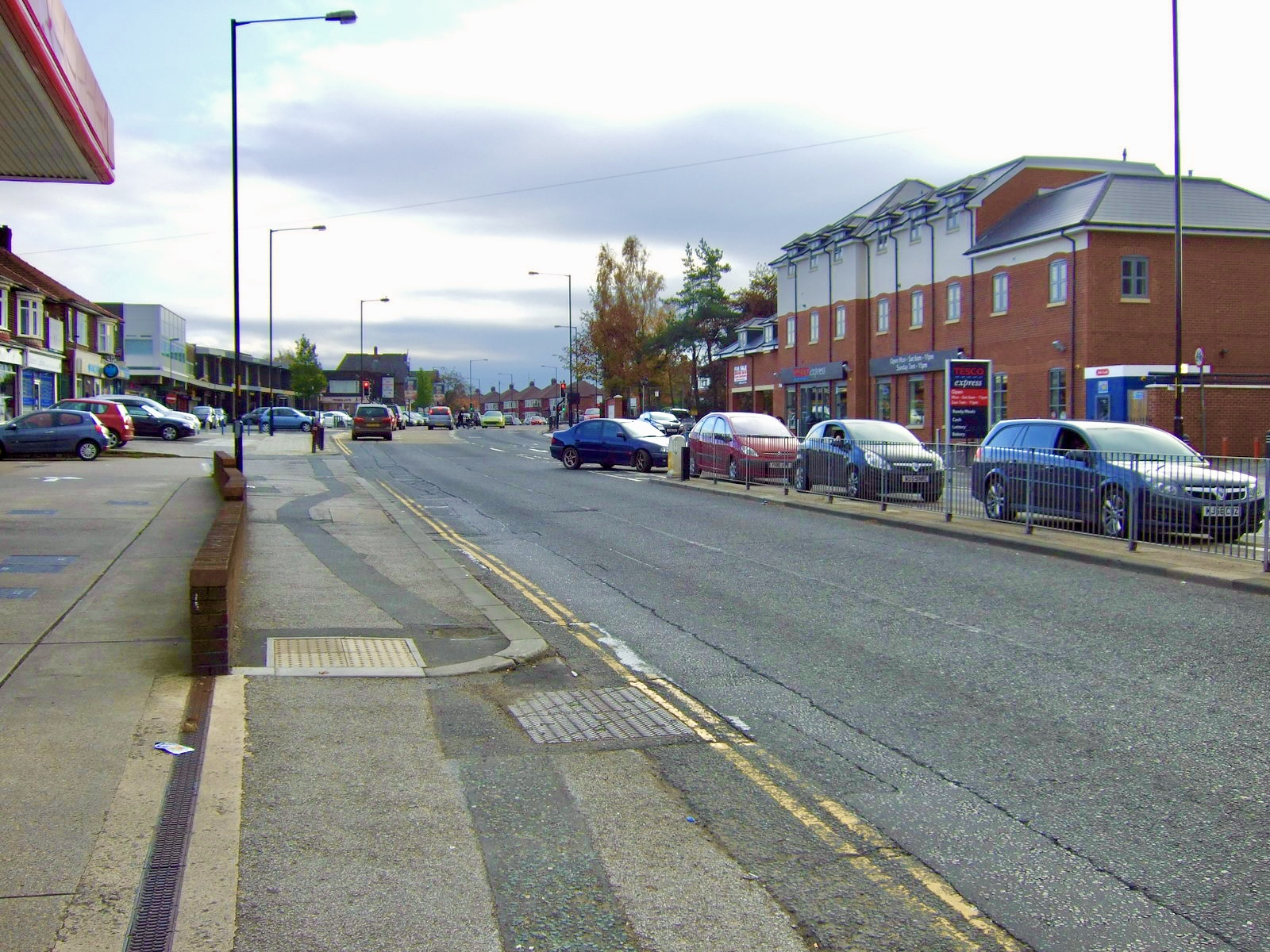
The main Acklam shopping area

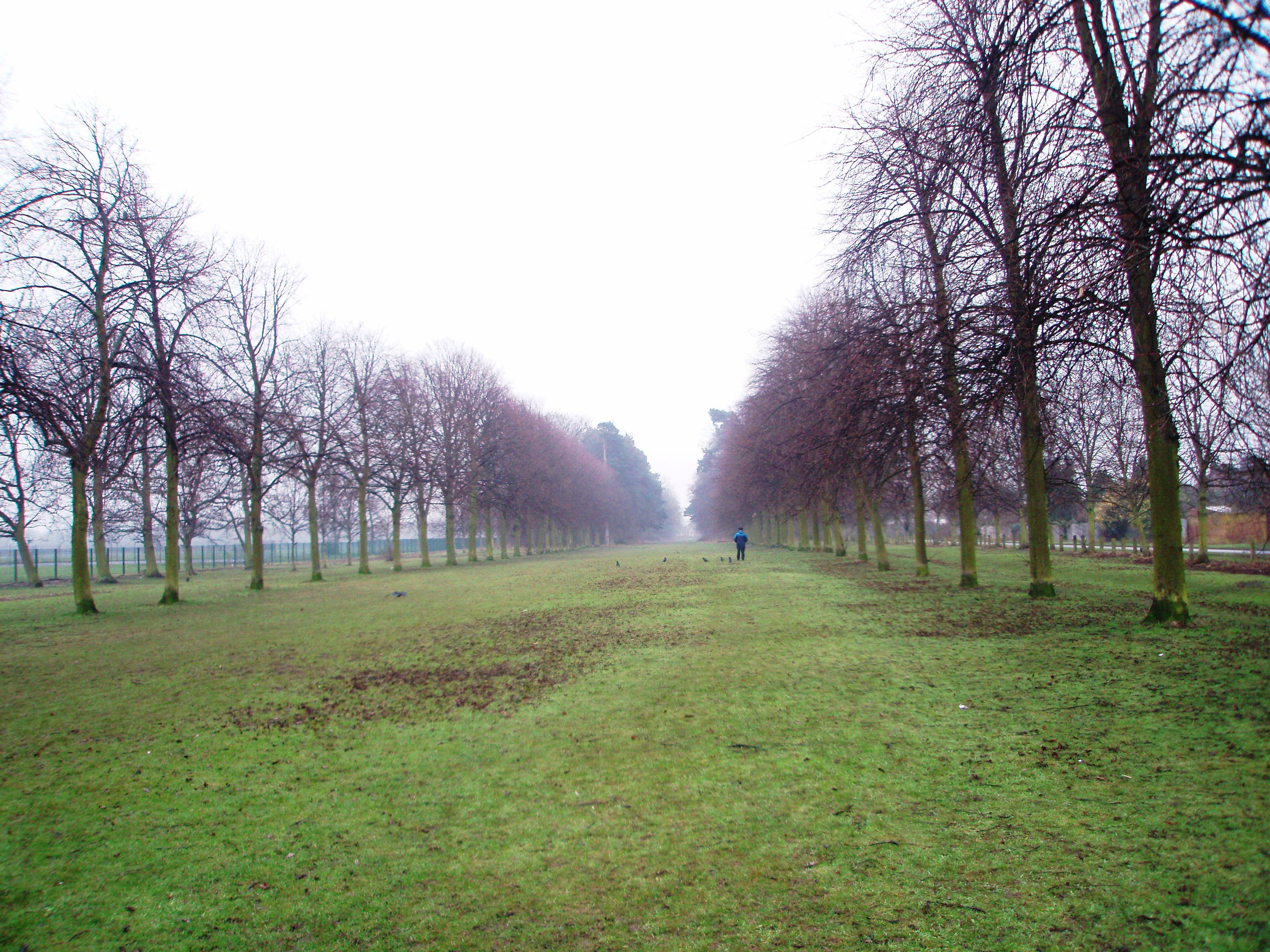
Acklam Hall's Avenue of Trees, in the distance Acklam Road

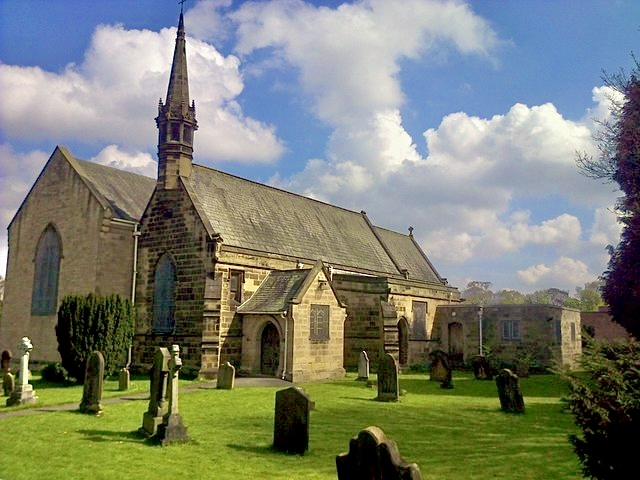
St Mary’s Church

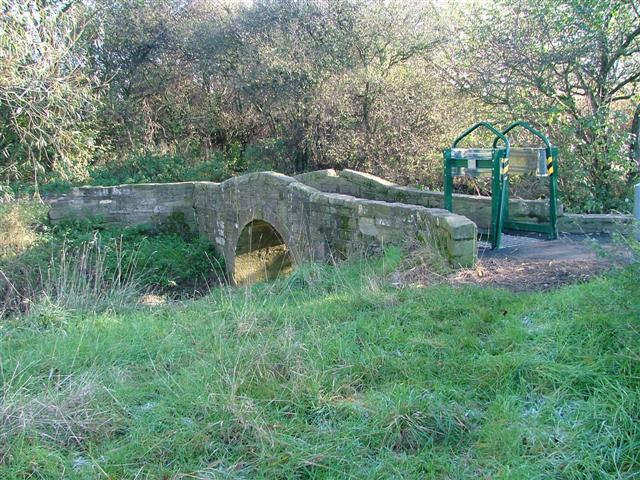
Newham Bridge (also known as the Devil’s Bridge)

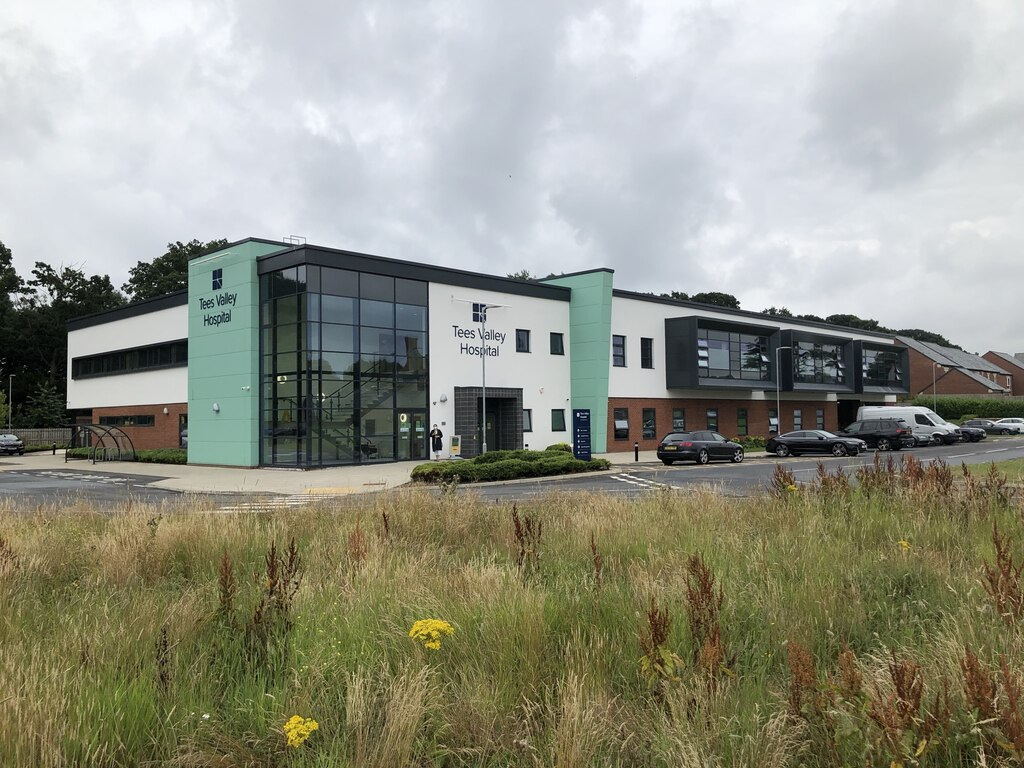
Tees Valley Hospital near Acklam Hall

== Education ==
In the Acklam ward is Newham Bridge Primary School. The previous Hall Garth Community Arts College and King's Manor School amalgamated to form Oakfields Community College and is presently Outwood Academy Acklam. Trimdon ward schools include Acklam Whin, St Clare's Primary.

Kader ward schools include Kader Academy and Acklam Grange, the latter previously Stainsby Secondary Modern. St. David's Roman Catholic Technology College (Kader ward) amalgamated with the other local Catholic secondary school and is now Trinity Catholic College, in nearby Saltersgill.

== Notable people ==
- Bob Mortimer – comedian and actor
- Pete Firman – comedian and magician
- Chris Rea – singer songwriter
- Brian Clough – footballer and football manager
- Elizabeth Carling – actress
- Steph McGovern – BBC business reporter
- Andy McDonald – Member of Parliament for Middlesbrough, was born in Acklam
- Alan Hughes MBE – vicar of Berwick and Canon of Newcastle Cathedral
