= St John's Church, Middlesbrough =

Parish Church in Middlesbrough, North Yorkshire, England

The Church of St John the Evangelist, Middlesbrough
- The Church of St John the Evangelist
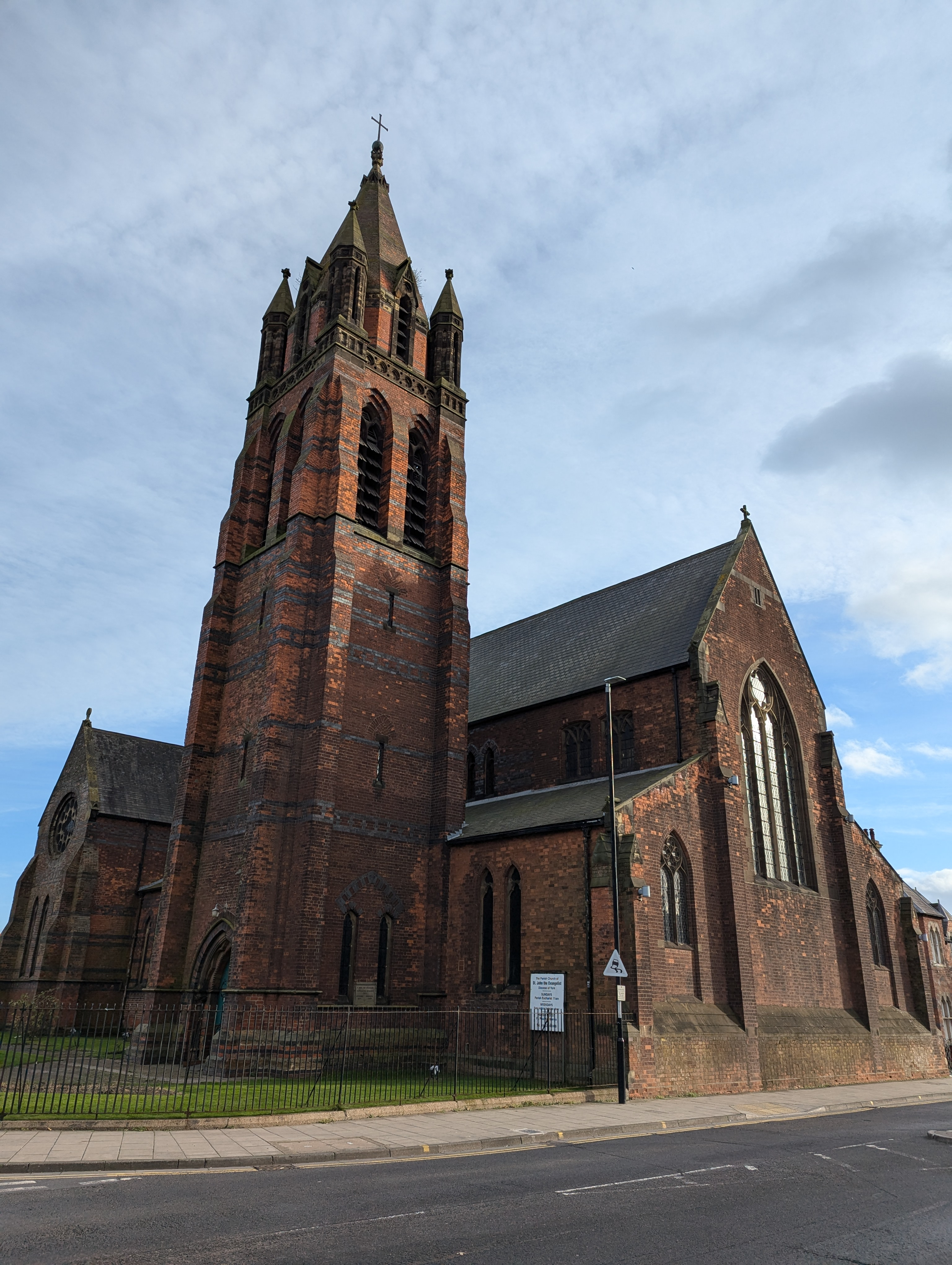
- The Church of St John the Evangelist, Middlesbrough
- The Church of St John the Evangelist, Middlesbrough
- 54.574°N 1.226°W
- OS grid reference: NZ 50111 20207
- Location: Middlesbrough, North Yorkshire
- Country: England
- Denomination: Church of England
- Website: www.columbawithjohn.org.uk

History
- Status: Active
- Dedication: Saint John the Evangelist
- Dedicated: 1865
- Consecrated: 1865

Architecture
- Functional status: Active
- Heritage designation: Grade II*
- Designated: July 1968
- Architect: John Norton
- Style: Early English style
- Completed: 1865

Administration
- Province: York
- Diocese: York
- Archdeaconry: Cleveland
- Deanery: Middlesbrough
- Parish: Middlesbrough

St John's Church, Middlesbrough, is the oldest parish church in the town of Middlesbrough in the ceremonial county of North Yorkshire, England. It is an active parish church and a Grade II* listed building which was listed by Historic England in July 1968. It is located at the junction of Marton Road, North Ormesby Road and Russell Street. It is opposite a small retail park and to the east of the main town centre. It can be seen when passing on the nearby A66 carriageway which passes the north and the east of the church. Its spire and tower is one of Middlesbrough's oldest and dominant landmarks which can be seen when bypassing the town.

== History ==
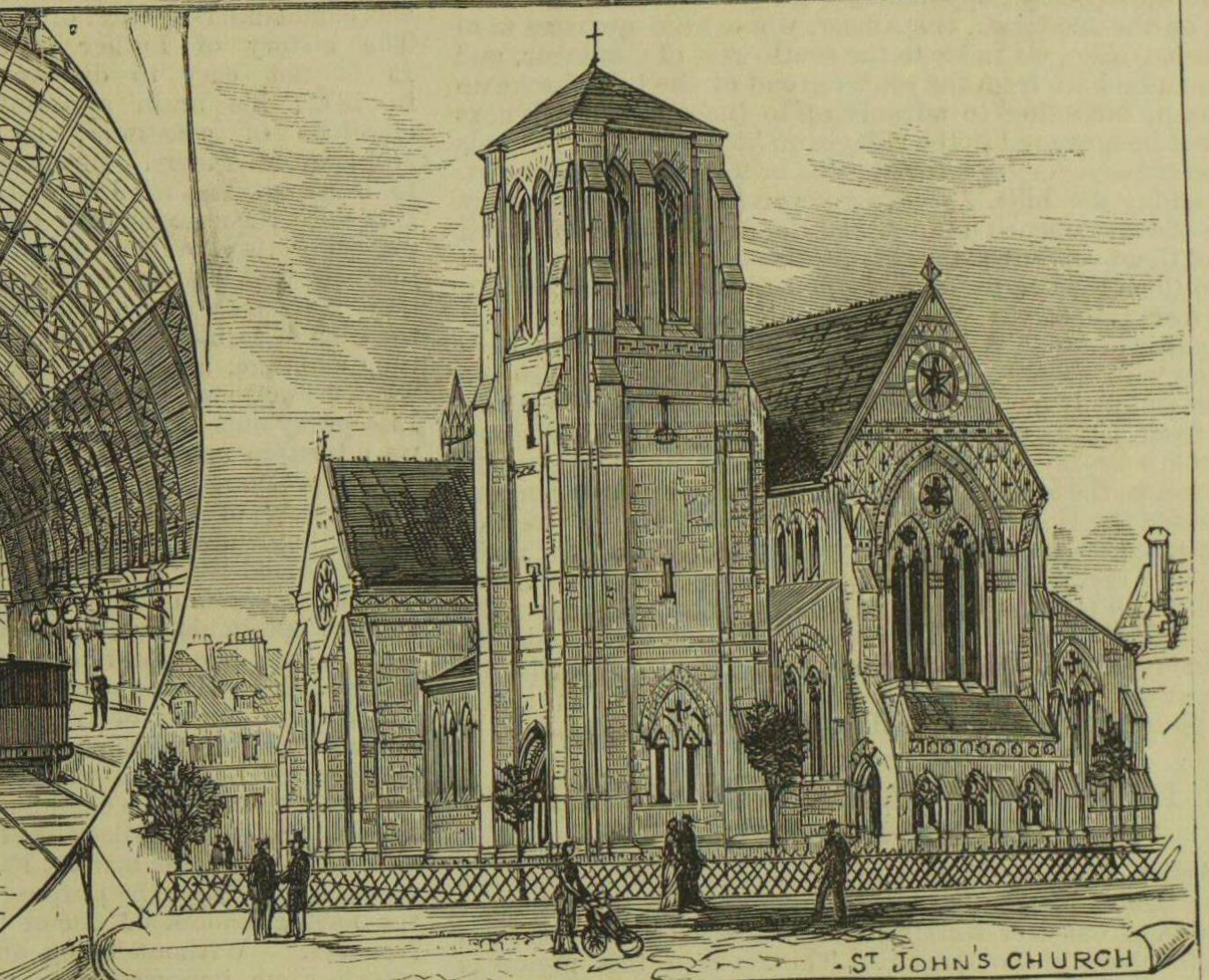
The church pictured in 1881, before changes made to the tower

The church was built in 1865 by architect John Norton and it was dedicated to Saint John the Evangelist after completion. Historic England's official listing describes the church as:

Red brick with sandstone and patterned polychrome brick dressings. Brick with stone dressings to extensions and porch. Welsh slate roofs. North-west tower, clerestoried nave with aisles, transepts and south porch, and short apsidal chancel with north vestry and south chapel Early English style, with plate tracery.

The church is one of many in the town and still continues to be important for local Christians and others for use for weddings, community events, celebrations and other functions. It forms a joint parish with St Columba's church.

== Present day ==
The church is the oldest parish church and place of worship in Middlesbrough and celebrated its 150th anniversary in 2015 and continues to have a strong importance to both the religious and non-religious community in Middlesbrough and surrounding areas. It is also seen as a local landmark and occupies an important position in the town centre.
